= List of Castilleja species =

List of paintbrush species

This is a list of the species in the genus Castilleja. They are commonly called paintbrushes, painted-cups, or owl’s-clovers in English. These species and two natural hybrids are considered valid by Plants of the World Online (POWO) as of 2024. This list largely agrees with World Flora Online (WFO) with some exceptions. WFO lists Castilleja eggeri as unchecked. It also spells some species names differently, Castilleja rhexiifolia with a single "i" instead of a double "ii", Castilleja tolucensis as Castilleja toluccensis, and Castilleja virgatoides as Castilleja virgayoides. In addition one of the two hybrids, Castilleja × cognata, is listed in WFO as a species rather than as a hybrid.

Image	Name	Common Name
	Castilleja affinis Hook. & Arn.	coast paintbrush
	Castilleja albobarbata Iltis & G.L.Nesom	
	Castilleja alpicola T.I.Chuang & Heckard	
	Castilleja ambigua Hook. & Arn.	salt-marsh owl-clover
	Castilleja angustata Eastw.	
	Castilleja angustifolia (Nutt.) G.Don	northwestern paintbrush
	Castilleja applegatei Fernald	wavyleaf paintbrush
	Castilleja aquariensis N.H.Holmgren	Aquarius Plateau paintbrush
	Castilleja arachnoidea Greenm.	cobwebby paintbrush
	Castilleja arctica Krylov & Serg.	
	Castilleja arvensis Schltdl. & Cham.	field paintbrush
	Castilleja aspera Eastw.	
	Castilleja attenuata (A.Gray) T.I.Chuang & Heckard	valley tassels
	Castilleja aurea B.L.Rob. & Greenm.	
	Castilleja auriculata Eastw.	
	Castilleja beldingii (Greene) Tank & J.M.Egger	
	Castilleja bella Standl.	
	Castilleja brevilobata Piper	short-lobed paintbrush
	Castilleja brevistyla (Hoover) T.I.Chuang & Heckard	shortstyle paintbrush
	Castilleja bryantii Brandegee	
	Castilleja campestris (Benth.) T.I.Chuang & Heckard	vernal pool paintbrush
	Castilleja cerroana Edwin	
	Castilleja cervina Greenm.	deer paintbrush
	Castilleja chambersii M.Egger & Meinke	chambers' paintbrush
	Castilleja chlorosceptron G.L.Nesom	
	Castilleja chlorotica Piper	green-tinged paintbrush
	Castilleja christii N.H.Holmgren	Christ's paintbrush
	Castilleja chromosa A.Nelson	desert paintbrush
	Castilleja chrymactis Pennell	Glacier Bay paintbrush
	Castilleja chrysantha Greenm.	Yellow Wallowa paintbrush
	Castilleja cinerea A.Gray	ash-gray paintbrush
	Castilleja citrina Pennell	lemon paintbrush
	Castilleja coccinea (L.) Spreng.	painted-cup paintbrush
	Castilleja × cognata Greene	
	Castilleja collegiorum J.M.Egger & Malaby	collegial paintbrush
	Castilleja conzattii Fernald	
	Castilleja covilleana Hend.	Coville's paintbrush
	Castilleja crista-galli Rydb.	mountainside paintbrush
	Castilleja cryptantha Pennell & G.N.Jones	obscure paintbrush
	Castilleja ctenodonta Eastw.	
	Castilleja cusickii Greenm.	Cusick's paintbrush
	Castilleja dendridion G.L.Nesom	
	Castilleja densiflora (Benth.) T.I.Chuang & Heckard	denseflower paintbrush
	Castilleja dissitiflora N.H.Holmgren	remote-flowered paintbrush
	Castilleja disticha Eastw.	distichous paintbrush
	Castilleja durangensis G.L.Nesom	
	Castilleja ecuadorensis N.H.Holmgren	Ecuador paintbrush
	Castilleja eggeri Franc.Gut., Cházaro & Avendaño	
	Castilleja elata Piper	siskiyou paintbrush
	Castilleja elegans Malte	elegant paintbrush
	Castilleja elmeri Fernald	Elmer's paintbrush
	Castilleja exigua J.M.Egger	
	Castilleja exserta (A.Heller) T.I.Chuang & Heckard	purple owl's-clover
	Castilleja falcata Eastw.	
	Castilleja filiflora G.L.Nesom	
	Castilleja fissifolia L.f.	
	Castilleja flava S.Watson	yellow paintbrush
	Castilleja foliolosa Hook. & Arn.	felt paintbrush
	Castilleja fraterna Greenm.	fraternal paintbrush
	Castilleja fruticosa Moran	
	Castilleja galactionovae Nikolin	
	Castilleja galehintoniae G.L.Nesom	Gale Hinton's paintbrush
	Castilleja genevievana G.L.Nesom	Genevieve's paintbrush
	Castilleja glandulifera Pennell	glandular paintbrush
	Castilleja gleasoni Elmer	frosted paintbrush
	Castilleja gonzaleziae G.L.Nesom	
	Castilleja gracilis Benth.	
	Castilleja gracillima Rydb.	slender paintbrush
	Castilleja grisea Dunkle	San Clemente Island paintbrush
	Castilleja guadalupensis Brandegee	Guadalupe Island paintbrush (extinct)
	Castilleja halophila Singhurst, J.M.Egger, Mink & W.C.Holmes	Texas seaside paintbrush
	Castilleja haydenii (A.Gray) Cockerell	Hayden's paintbrush
	Castilleja hidalgensis J.M.Egger	
	Castilleja hirsuta M.Martens & Galeotti	
	Castilleja hispida Benth.	harsh paintbrush
	Castilleja holmgrenii J.M.Egger	
	Castilleja hololeuca Greene	island paintbrush
	Castilleja hyparctica Rebrist.	
	Castilleja hyperborea Pennell	northern paintbrush
	Castilleja indivisa Engelm.	Texas paintbrush
	Castilleja integra A.Gray	orange paintbrush wholeleaf paintbrush
	Castilleja integrifolia L.f.	
	Castilleja irasuensis Oerst.	
	Castilleja jiquilpana G.L.Nesom	
	Castilleja kaibabensis N.H.Holmgren	Kaibab Plateau paintbrush
	Castilleja kerryana J.M.Egger	Kerry's paintbrush
	Castilleja kraliana J.R.Allison	Cahaba paintbrush
	Castilleja lacera (Benth.) T.I.Chuang & Heckard	cutleaf paintbrush
	Castilleja laciniata Hook. & Arn.	
	Castilleja lanata A.Gray	wooly paintbrush
	Castilleja lapponica Gand. ex Rebrist.	
	Castilleja lasiorhyncha (A.Gray) T.I.Chuang & Heckard	San Bernardino Mountains owl's-clover
	Castilleja lassenensis Eastw.	Lassen paintbrush
	Castilleja latifolia Hook. & Arn.	Monterey paintbrush
	Castilleja lebgueana G.L.Nesom	
	Castilleja lemmonii A.Gray	Lemmon's paintbrush
	Castilleja lentii N.H.Holmgren	
	Castilleja leschkeana J.T.Howell	Glacier Bay paintbrush
	Castilleja levisecta Greenm.	golden paintbrush
	Castilleja linariifolia Benth.	Wyoming paintbrush
	Castilleja lindheimeri A.Gray	Lindheimer's paintbrush
	Castilleja lineariloba (Benth.) T.I.Chuang & Heckard	linear-lobed owl's-clover
	Castilleja lineata Greene	marshmeadow paintbrush
	Castilleja linifolia N.H.Holmgren	
	Castilleja litoralis Pennell	littoral paintbrush
	Castilleja longiflora Kunze	
	Castilleja lutescens (Greenm.) Rydb.	stiff yellow paintbrush
	Castilleja macrostigma B.L.Rob.	
	Castilleja madrigalii C.Medina & E.Carranza	
	Castilleja martini Abrams	Camp Martin paintbrush
	Castilleja mcvaughii N.H.Holmgren	
	Castilleja mendocinensis (Eastw.) Pennell	Mendocino Coast paintbrush
	Castilleja meridensis Pennell	
	Castilleja mexicana (Hemsl.) A.Gray	Mexican paintbrush
	Castilleja miniata Douglas ex Benth.	scarlet paintbrush
	Castilleja minor (A.Gray) A.Gray	thread-torch paintbrush
	Castilleja mogollonica Pennell	Mogollon paintbrush
	Castilleja mollis Pennell	soft-leaved paintbrush
	Castilleja montigena Heckard	Heckard’s paintbrush
	Castilleja moranensis Kunth	
	Castilleja nana Eastw.	dwarf paintbrush
	Castilleja nelsonii Eastw.	southern mountains paintbrush
	Castilleja nervata Eastw.	nerved paintbrush
	Castilleja nitricola Eastw.	
	Castilleja nivea Pennell & Ownbey	snowy paintbrush
	Castilleja nivibractea G.L.Nesom	
	Castilleja nubigena Kunth	
	Castilleja occidentalis Torr.	western yellow paintbrush
	Castilleja ophiocephala Tank & J.M.Egger	
	Castilleja oresbia Greenm.	pale wallowa paintbrush
	Castilleja organorum Standl.	Organ Mountains paintbrush
	Castilleja ornata Eastw.	ornate paintbrush
	Castilleja ortegae Standl.	
	Castilleja pallescens (A.Gray) Greenm.	pale paintbrush
	Castilleja pallida (L.) Kunth	pale paintbrush
	Castilleja palmeri Eastw.	
	Castilleja papilionacea G.L.Nesom	
	Castilleja paramensis F.González & Pabón-Mora	
	Castilleja parviflora Bong.	rosy paintbrush
	Castilleja parvula Rydb.	Tushar Mountains paintbrush
	Castilleja patriotica Fernald	native paintbrush
	Castilleja pavlovii Rebrist.	
	Castilleja peckiana Pennell	Peck’s paintbrush
	Castilleja pectinata M.Martens & Galeotti	
	Castilleja peirsonii Eastw.	Peirson’s paintbrush
	Castilleja perelegans G.L.Nesom	
	Castilleja peruviana T.I.Chuang & Heckard	Peruvian paintbrush
	Castilleja pilosa (S.Watson) Rydb.	hairy paintbrush
	Castilleja plagiotoma A.Gray	Mojave Desert paintbrush
	Castilleja porphyrosceptron G.L.Nesom	
	Castilleja × porterae Cockerell	Porter's paintbrush
	Castilleja praeterita Heckard & Bacig.	Salmon Creek paintbrush
	Castilleja pringlei Fernald	
	Castilleja profunda T.I.Chuang & Heckard	
	Castilleja pruinosa Fernald	frosted paintbrush
	Castilleja pseudohyperborea Rebrist.	
	Castilleja pseudopallescens Edwin	
	Castilleja pterocaulon N.H.Holmgren	
	Castilleja puberula Rydb.	alpine paintbrush
	Castilleja pulchella Rydb.	showy paintbrush
	Castilleja pumila (Benth.) Wedd.	lancetilla del páramo
	Castilleja purpurascens Greenm.	yoho paintbrush
	Castilleja purpurea (Nutt.) G.Don	purplish paintbrush
	Castilleja quiexobrensis G.L.Nesom	
	Castilleja quirosii Standl.	
	Castilleja racemosa (Breedlove & Heckard) T.I.Chuang & Heckard	
	Castilleja raupii Pennell	Raup’s paintbrush
	Castilleja revealii N.H.Holmgren	Bryce Canyon paintbrush
	Castilleja rhexiifolia Rydb.	rhexia-leaved paintbrush
	Castilleja rhizomata N.H.Holmgren	
	Castilleja rigida Eastw.	rigid paintbrush
	Castilleja roei Crosswh.	
	Castilleja rubicundula (Jeps.) T.I.Chuang & Heckard	cream sacs
	Castilleja rubida Piper	purple alpine paintbrush
	Castilleja rubra (Drobow) Rebrist.	
	Castilleja rupicola Piper ex Fernald	cliff paintbrush
	Castilleja salaisolaveae J.M.Egger, Velazco & Huereca	
	Castilleja salsuginosa N.H.Holmgren	Monte Neva paintbrush
	Castilleja saltensis Eastw.	
	Castilleja scabrida Eastw.	rough paintbrush
	Castilleja schaffneri Hemsl.	
	Castilleja schizotricha Greenm.	split-haired paintbrush
	Castilleja scorzonerifolia Kunth	scorzonera-leafed paintbrush
	Castilleja septentrionalis Lindl.	sulfur paintbrush
	Castilleja sessiliflora Pursh	downy paintbrush
	Castilleja sphaerostigma Eastw.	
	Castilleja spiranthoides Standl.	
	Castilleja stenophylla M.E.Jones	
	Castilleja steyermarkii Pennell	
	Castilleja stipifolia G.L.Nesom	
	Castilleja subalpina Eastw.	
	Castilleja subinclusa Greene	longleaf paintbrush
	Castilleja suksdorfii A.Gray	Suksdorf’s paintbrush
	Castilleja talamancensis N.H.Holmgren	
	Castilleja tapeinoclada Loes.	
	Castilleja tayloriorum N.H.Holmgren	
	Castilleja tenella Rebrist.	
	Castilleja tenuiflora Benth.	Santa Catalina paintbrush
	Castilleja tenuifolia M.Martens & Galeotti	
	Castilleja tenuis (A.Heller) T.I.Chuang & Heckard	hairy owl’s clover
	Castilleja thompsonii Pennell	Thompson’s paintbrush
	Castilleja tolucensis Kunth	
	Castilleja tomentosa A.Gray	tomentose paintbrush
	Castilleja trujillensis Pennell	
	Castilleja uliginosa Eastw.	Pitkin Marsh paintbrush
	Castilleja unalaschcensis (Cham. & Schltdl.) Malte	coastal paintbrush
	Castilleja vadosa T.I.Chuang & Heckard	
	Castilleja variocolorata A.P.Khokhr.	
	Castilleja venusta Rzed.	
	Castilleja victoriae Fairbarns & J.M.Egger	Victoria’s owl’s-clover
	Castilleja virgata (Wedd.) Edwin	
	Castilleja virgatoides Edwin	
	Castilleja viscidula A.Gray	sticky paintbrush
	Castilleja wallowensis Pennell	Wallowa paintbrush
	Castilleja wightii Elmer	Wight’s paintbrush
	Castilleja wootonii Standl.	Wooton’s paintbrush
	Castilleja xanthotricha Pennell	yellow-hairy paintbrush
	Castilleja zempoaltepetlensis G.L.Nesom	
