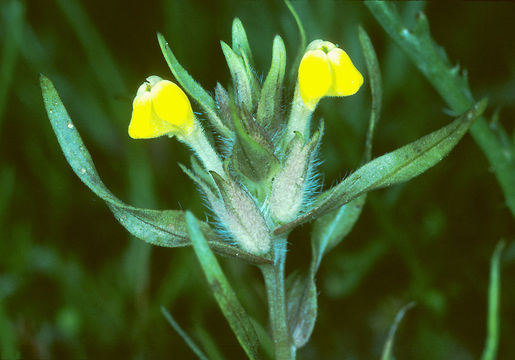

Scientific classification
- Kingdom: Plantae
- Clade: Tracheophytes
- Clade: Angiosperms
- Clade: Eudicots
- Clade: Asterids
- Order: Lamiales
- Family: Orobanchaceae
- Genus: Castilleja
- Species: C. campestris

Binomial name
- Castilleja campestris (Benth.) T.I.Chuang & Heckard

= Castilleja campestris =

Species of flowering plant

Castilleja campestris is a species of Indian paintbrush known by the common name vernal pool Indian paintbrush. It is native to California and southern Oregon, where it grows in seasonally moist habitat, especially vernal pools.

== Description ==
It is an annual herb growing 10 to 30 centimeters tall with linear or narrowly lance-shaped leaves up to 4 centimeters long. The inflorescence is up to 15 centimeters long. It is filled with leaflike green bracts which are generally not tipped with another color. The flower is yellow or orange.

== Subspecies ==
There are two subspecies of this plant. The rare Castilleja campestris subspecies succulenta, the succulent owl's clover or fleshy Indian paintbrush, is endemic to California and limited to the San Joaquin Valley of California and adjacent lower Sierra Nevada foothills, where its vernal pool habitat has been largely eliminated for human activity such as agriculture and development.
