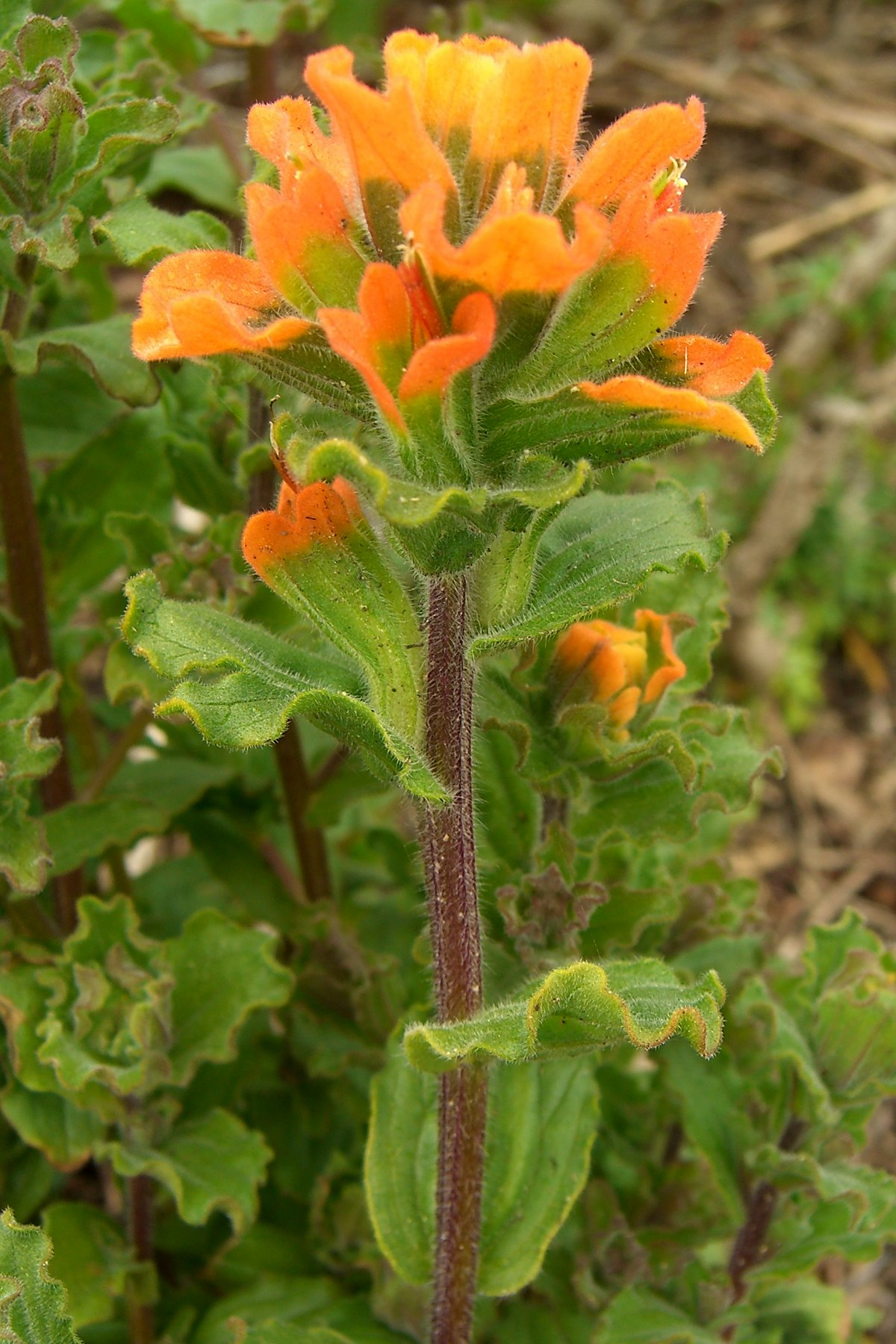

Scientific classification
- Kingdom: Plantae
- Clade: Embryophytes
- Clade: Tracheophytes
- Clade: Angiosperms
- Clade: Eudicots
- Clade: Asterids
- Order: Lamiales
- Family: Orobanchaceae
- Genus: Castilleja
- Species: C. latifolia

Binomial name
- Castilleja latifolia Hook. & Arn.

= Castilleja latifolia =

Species of flowering plant

Castilleja latifolia is a species of Indian paintbrush known by the common name Monterey Indian paintbrush or Monterey paintbrush.

It is endemic to the coastline of California between the San Francisco Bay Area and Monterey County. Its range extends from about Point Reyes to Big Sur. It is a plant of the immediate coastline, growing in sand dunes and coastal sage scrub.

== Description ==
This wildflower is a perennial herb growing up to about 60 centimeters tall and spreading into a shrublike form as it ages over the years.

It is bristly and hairy, with green, gray-green, purple or purple-tinted herbage. The fleshy leaves are rounded or oval and up to 2 centimeters long.

The inflorescence is made up of layers of greenish bracts tipped with dull to very bright shades of red, orange, or yellow. Between the bracts appear the flowers, which are often similar in coloration. The fruit is a capsule up to 2 centimeters long.
