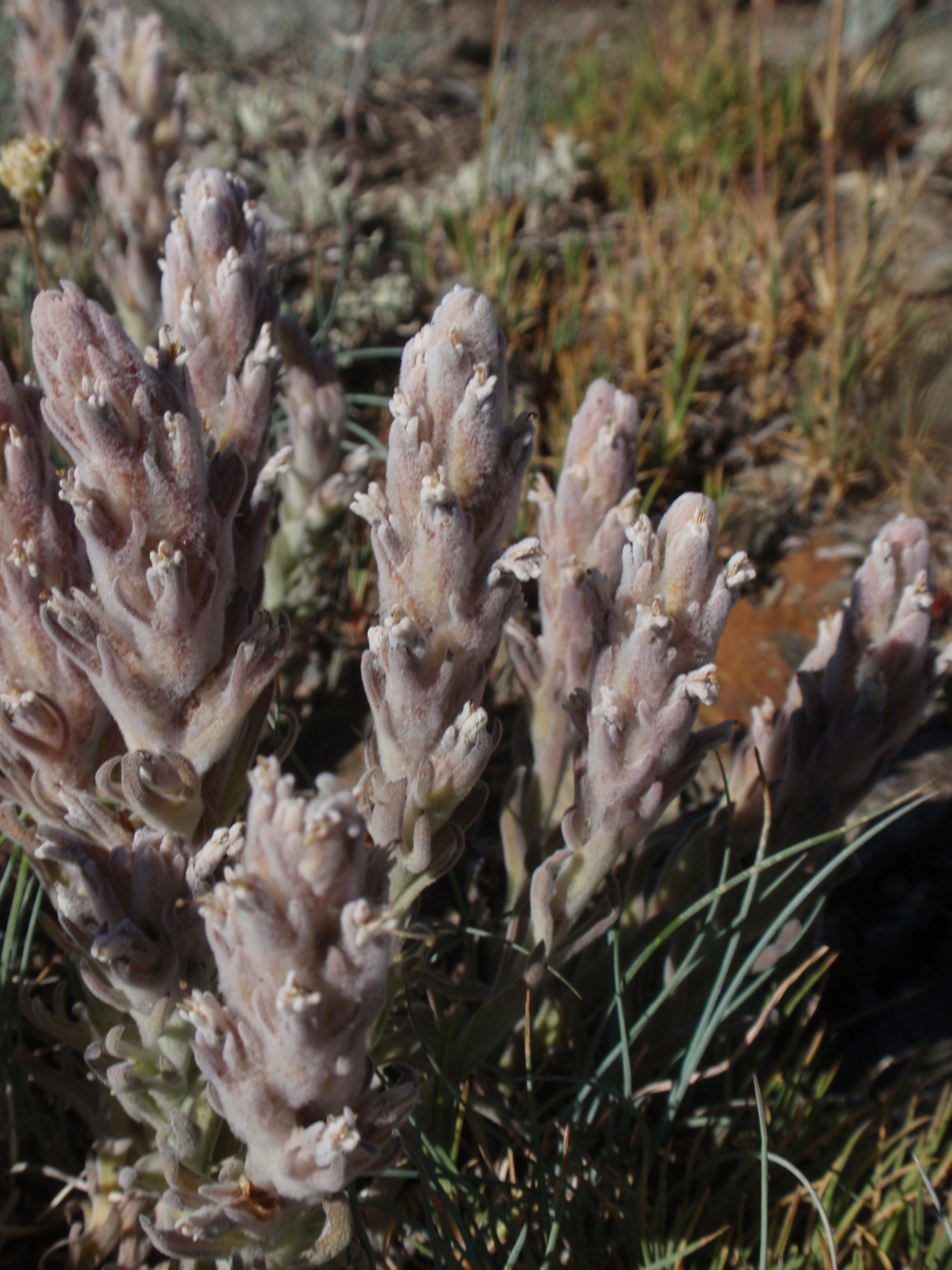

Scientific classification
- Kingdom: Plantae
- Clade: Tracheophytes
- Clade: Angiosperms
- Clade: Eudicots
- Clade: Asterids
- Order: Lamiales
- Family: Orobanchaceae
- Genus: Castilleja
- Species: C. schizotricha

Binomial name
- Castilleja schizotricha Greenm.

= Castilleja schizotricha =

Species of plant

Castilleja schizotricha is a species of Indian paintbrush known by the common name splithair Indian paintbrush.

It is endemic to the Klamath Mountains of northwestern California southwestern Oregon. It grows in rocky soils in temperate coniferous forests.

== Description ==
Castilleja schizotricha is a perennial herb and wildflower growing not more than about 15 centimeters tall and coated thickly in light-colored hairs, giving it a gray or white color.

The woolly inflorescence is made up of layers of dusty red or pink bracts. Between the bracts emerge pouched dull reddish flowers.
