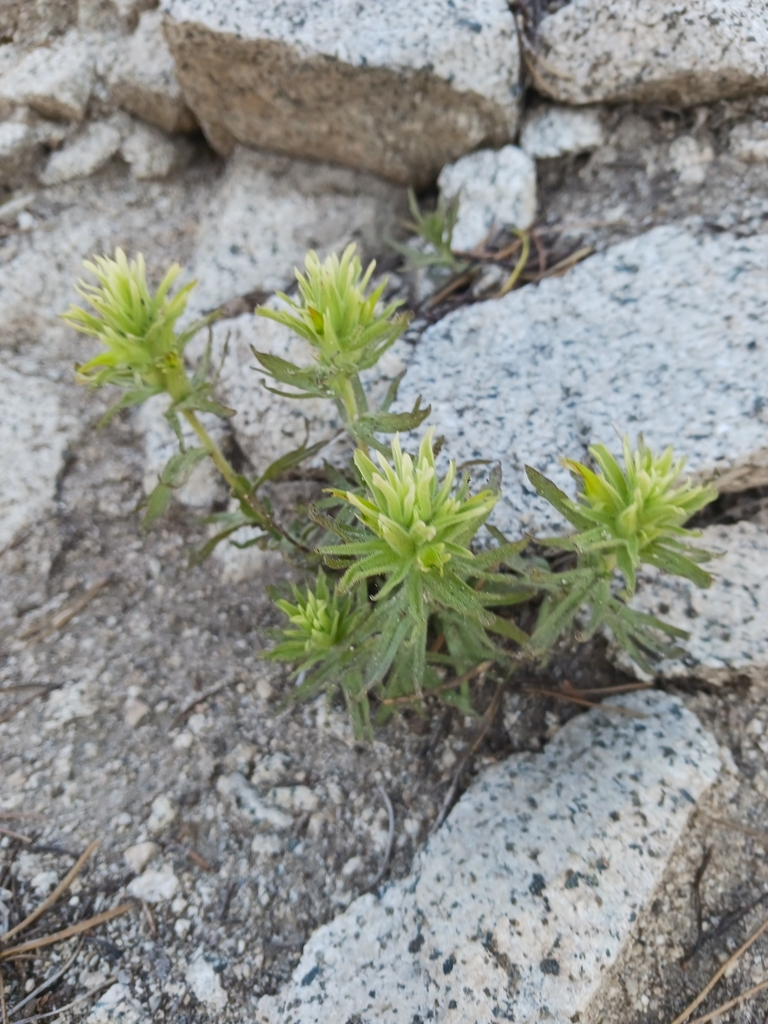

Scientific classification
- Kingdom: Plantae
- Clade: Tracheophytes
- Clade: Angiosperms
- Clade: Eudicots
- Clade: Asterids
- Order: Lamiales
- Family: Orobanchaceae
- Genus: Castilleja
- Species: C. glandulifera

Binomial name
- Castilleja glandulifera Pennell

= Castilleja glandulifera =

Species of flowering plant

Castilleja glandulifera, commonly called the glandular paintbrush or sticky paintbrush is a species of paintbrush.

== Description ==
This is a short perennial plant growing 4–15 in (100–380 mm) long. Leaves are yellowish-green with brighter yellow bracts. Upper plant has a gland that produces a sticky substance, hence both the common names Glandular and Sticky Paintbrush.

== Range ==
Near endemic to the subalpine zones of eastern Oregon (Blue Mountains), with disjunct populations in California and Idaho.

== Habitat ==
Grows in sandy granite slopes, talus, and hillsides at 6,500–10,000 ft (2,000–3,000 m).

== Phenology ==
Blooms from June to September.
