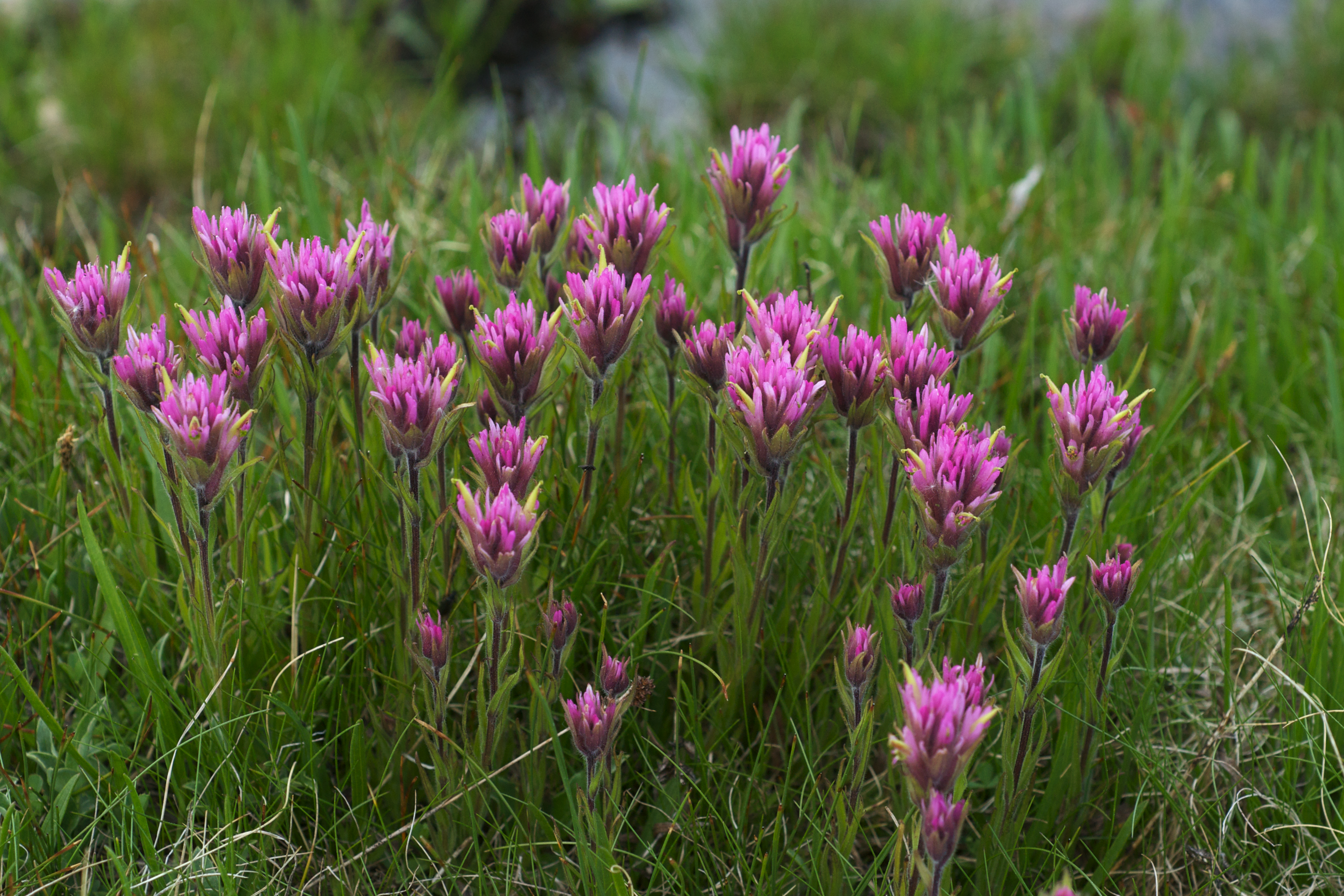

Conservation status
- Vulnerable (NatureServe)

Scientific classification
- Kingdom: Plantae
- Clade: Tracheophytes
- Clade: Angiosperms
- Clade: Eudicots
- Clade: Asterids
- Order: Lamiales
- Family: Orobanchaceae
- Genus: Castilleja
- Species: C. lemmonii

Binomial name
- Castilleja lemmonii A.Gray

Synonyms
- Castilleja culbertsonii Castilleja lassenensis

= Castilleja lemmonii =

Species of flowering plant

Castilleja lemmonii is a species of Indian paintbrush known by the common name Lemmon's Indian paintbrush or meadow paintbrush.

It is native to the higher elevations of the Sierra Nevada and Southern Cascade Range in California, and just into western Nevada. It grows in moist meadows.

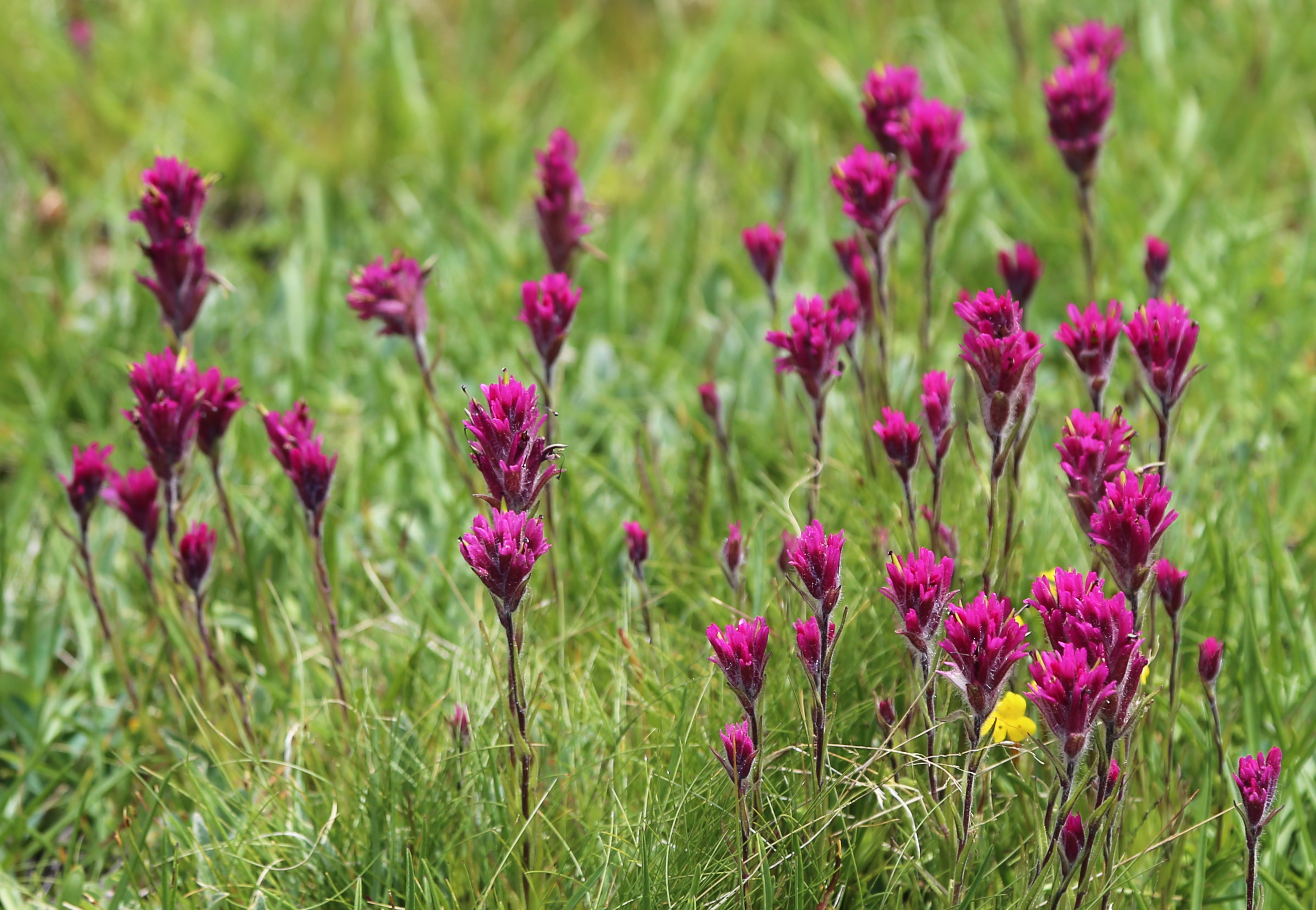
Castilleja lemmonii, group of deep purple-pink plants in meadow

== Description ==
Castilleja lemmonii is a perennial herb 10 to 20 centimeters tall coated in glandular hairs. The leaves are 2 to 4 centimeters long and linear to narrowly lance-shaped.

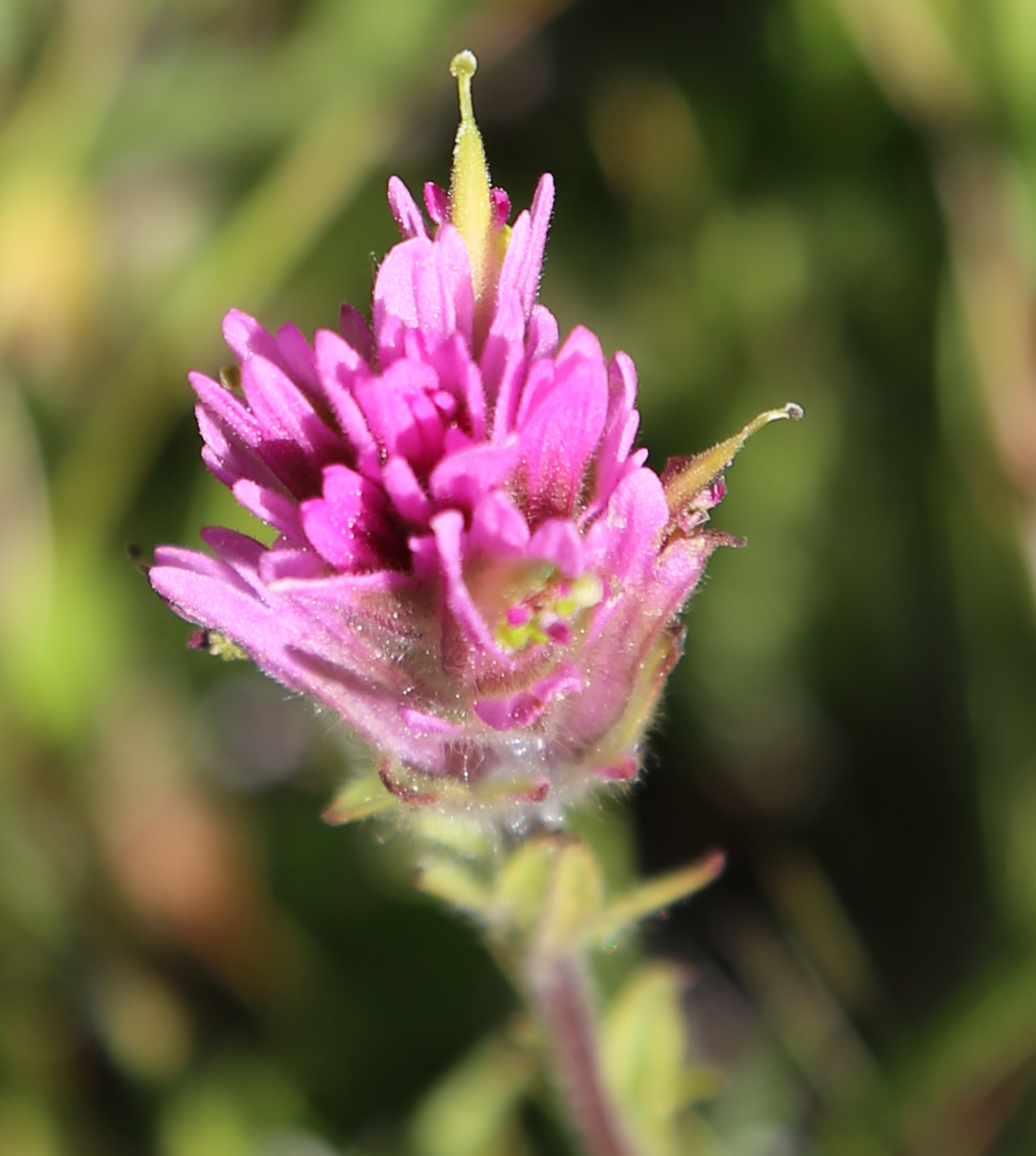
Closeup of Castilleja lemmonii inflorescence, pink bracts & small yellow, stamen-tipped flowers

The inflorescence is made up of many purple- or pink-tipped greenish bracts. Between the bracts appear small yellowish flowers.
