= Castilleja nubigena =

Conservation status
- Least Concern (IUCN 3.1)

Scientific classification
- Kingdom: Plantae
- Clade: Tracheophytes
- Clade: Angiosperms
- Clade: Eudicots
- Clade: Asterids
- Order: Lamiales
- Family: Orobanchaceae
- Genus: Castilleja
- Species: C. nubigena

Binomial name
- Castilleja nubigena Kunth

Species of flowering plant

Castilleja nubigena is a species of plant in the family Orobanchaceae. It is endemic to Ecuador.
