= Castilleja praeterita =

Conservation status
- Imperiled (NatureServe)

Scientific classification
- Kingdom: Plantae
- Clade: Tracheophytes
- Clade: Angiosperms
- Clade: Eudicots
- Clade: Asterids
- Order: Lamiales
- Family: Orobanchaceae
- Genus: Castilleja
- Species: C. praeterita

Binomial name
- Castilleja praeterita Heckard & Bacig.

Species of flowering plant

Castilleja praeterita is a species of Indian paintbrush known by the common name Salmon Creek Indian paintbrush. It is endemic to the High Sierra Nevada of California, where it grows in dry sagebrush meadows.

== Description ==
This is a branching perennial herb growing up to 18 in (46 cm) in height. The linear leaves are 3 to 5 centimeters long. The glandular, hairy inflorescence is made up of pale green bracts tipped in pale red to bright yellow. Between the bracts emerge the pouched flowers which are tinted with purple or yellow along the edges.
