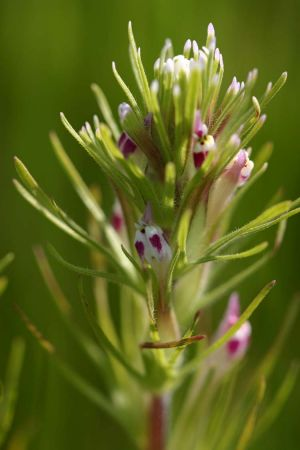

Scientific classification
- Kingdom: Plantae
- Clade: Tracheophytes
- Clade: Angiosperms
- Clade: Eudicots
- Clade: Asterids
- Order: Lamiales
- Family: Orobanchaceae
- Genus: Castilleja
- Species: C. brevistyla

Binomial name
- Castilleja brevistyla (Hoover) T.I.Chuang & Heckard

= Castilleja brevistyla =

Species of flowering plant

Castilleja brevistyla is a species of Castilleja (Indian paintbrush) known by the common name shortstyle Indian paintbrush.

It is endemic to California, where it grows on the grassy mountain slopes surrounding the San Joaquin Valley.

== Description ==
This annual herb grows up to about 40 centimeters tall with linear leaves each a few centimeters long. The inflorescence has bracts tipped in pink or reddish purple. Between the bracts appear pouched, fuzzy purplish or pink flowers.
