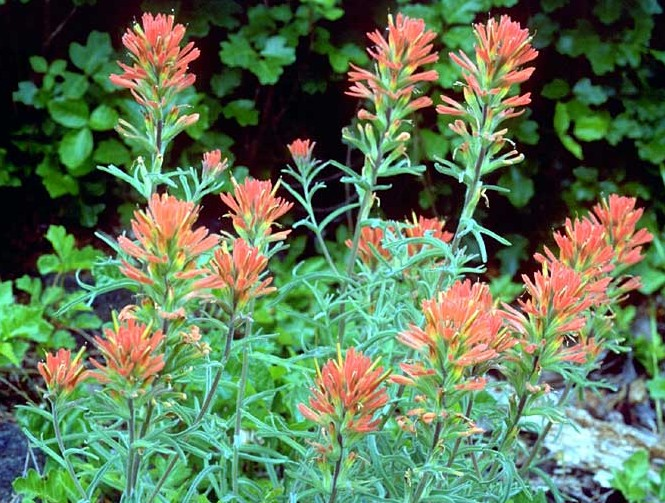

Scientific classification
- Kingdom: Plantae
- Clade: Tracheophytes
- Clade: Angiosperms
- Clade: Eudicots
- Clade: Asterids
- Order: Lamiales
- Family: Orobanchaceae
- Genus: Castilleja
- Species: C. pruinosa

Binomial name
- Castilleja pruinosa Fernald

= Castilleja pruinosa =

Species of flowering plant

Castilleja pruinosa is a species of Indian paintbrush known by the common name frosted Indian paintbrush. It is native to California and Oregon, where it grows in several types of forested habitat.

== Description ==
Castilleja pruinosa is a perennial herb, sometimes becoming bushy, growing up to about 80 centimeters in maximum height. It is densely hairy, becoming gray-green in color. The leaves are lance-shaped and sometimes lobed, measuring up to 8 centimeters long. The inflorescence is a cluster of bright red or orange-red bracts. Flowers emerge between the bracts, each up to 2 or 3 centimeters long and greenish in color with reddish margins.

== San Gabriel Mountains ==
The rare species Castilleja gleasonii, which is endemic to the San Gabriel Mountains of California, is sometimes included in C. pruinosa.
