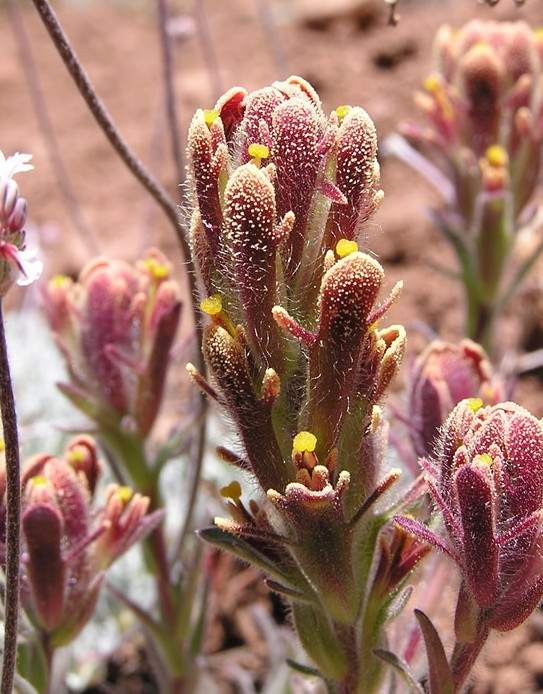

Conservation status
- Threatened (ESA)

Scientific classification
- Kingdom: Plantae
- Clade: Tracheophytes
- Clade: Angiosperms
- Clade: Eudicots
- Clade: Asterids
- Order: Lamiales
- Family: Orobanchaceae
- Genus: Castilleja
- Species: C. cinerea

Binomial name
- Castilleja cinerea A.Gray

= Castilleja cinerea =

Species of flowering plant

Castilleja cinerea is a species of Indian paintbrush known by the common name ashgray Indian paintbrush. It is endemic to San Bernardino County, California, where it is known only from the San Bernardino Mountains. There are about 200 occurrences known.

== Description ==
This is a perennial herb growing up to 15 centimeters tall and covered in a coat of ash-gray woolly hairs. The leaves are linear or narrowly lance-shaped and one or two centimeters long. The inflorescence is made up of fuzzy dull to bright reddish or purplish pink bracts between which emerge smaller yellowish to greenish flowers. The color of the inflorescence is influenced by the environment of the plant; those with more northern exposures tend to have yellowish flowers and those facing south have more reddish flowers.

Like other Castilleja species, this plant parasitizes other species for water and nutrients; C. cinerea is generally found tapping buckwheats (Eriogonum spp.) and sagebrushes (Artemisia spp.).

== Habitat ==
Castilleja cinerea grows in several habitat types, including dry desert and sagebrush scrub, woodland, and coniferous forest. It is also known from the unique quartzite pebble plain habitat in these mountains, which it shares with other endemics such as Arenaria ursina.

=== Threats ===
The Castilleja cinerea plant is a federally listed threatened species. Threats to its survival include development of its habitat for human use, recreation, off-road vehicles, logging, grazing, mining, and invasive species of plants.
