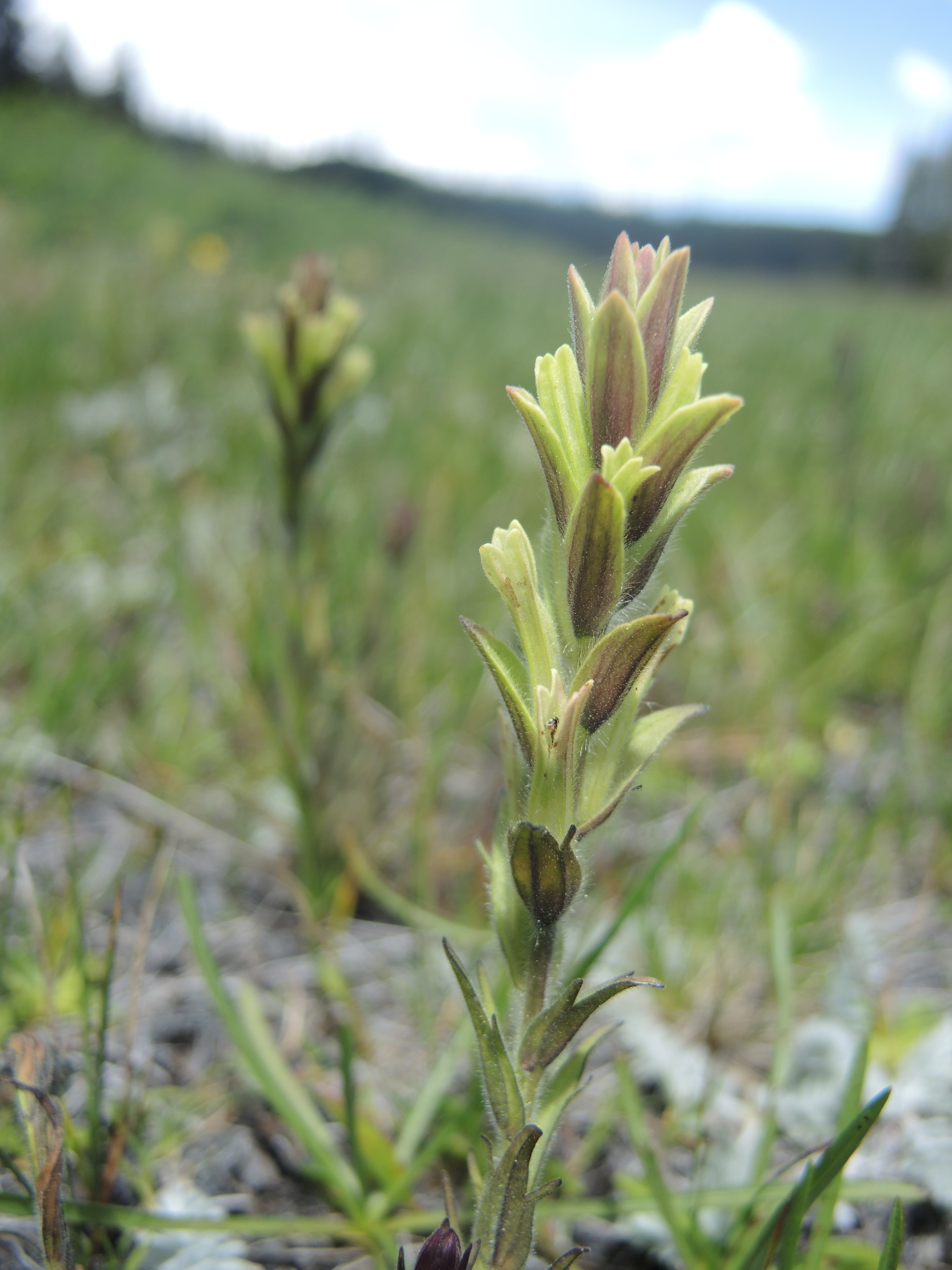

Conservation status
- Critically Imperiled (NatureServe)

Scientific classification
- Kingdom: Plantae
- Clade: Tracheophytes
- Clade: Angiosperms
- Clade: Eudicots
- Clade: Asterids
- Order: Lamiales
- Family: Orobanchaceae
- Genus: Castilleja
- Species: C. collegiorum

Binomial name
- Castilleja collegiorum J.M.Egger & Malaby

= Castilleja collegiorum =

Species of flowering plant

The perennial herbaceous plant Castilleja collegiorum is a species of Castilleja known by the common name collegial paintbrush.

It is endemic to a single meadow complex in Oregon, where it grows in open mixed-species meadow sites. Like all narrow endemics, it is highly vulnerable to habitat destruction.

== Description ==
The plant is a small, slender, perennial herb with erect, unbranched stems and narrow leaves 15 to 35 millimetres (0.59 to 1.38 in) long. Its flowers are pale greenish-yellow, 18 to 25 millimetres (0.71 to 0.98 in) long, and each is subtended by a reddish bract. Other than the flowers, there is little visible difference between the inflorescence and the sterile parts of the stem below it; the bracts and foliage leaves are only weakly differentiated.
