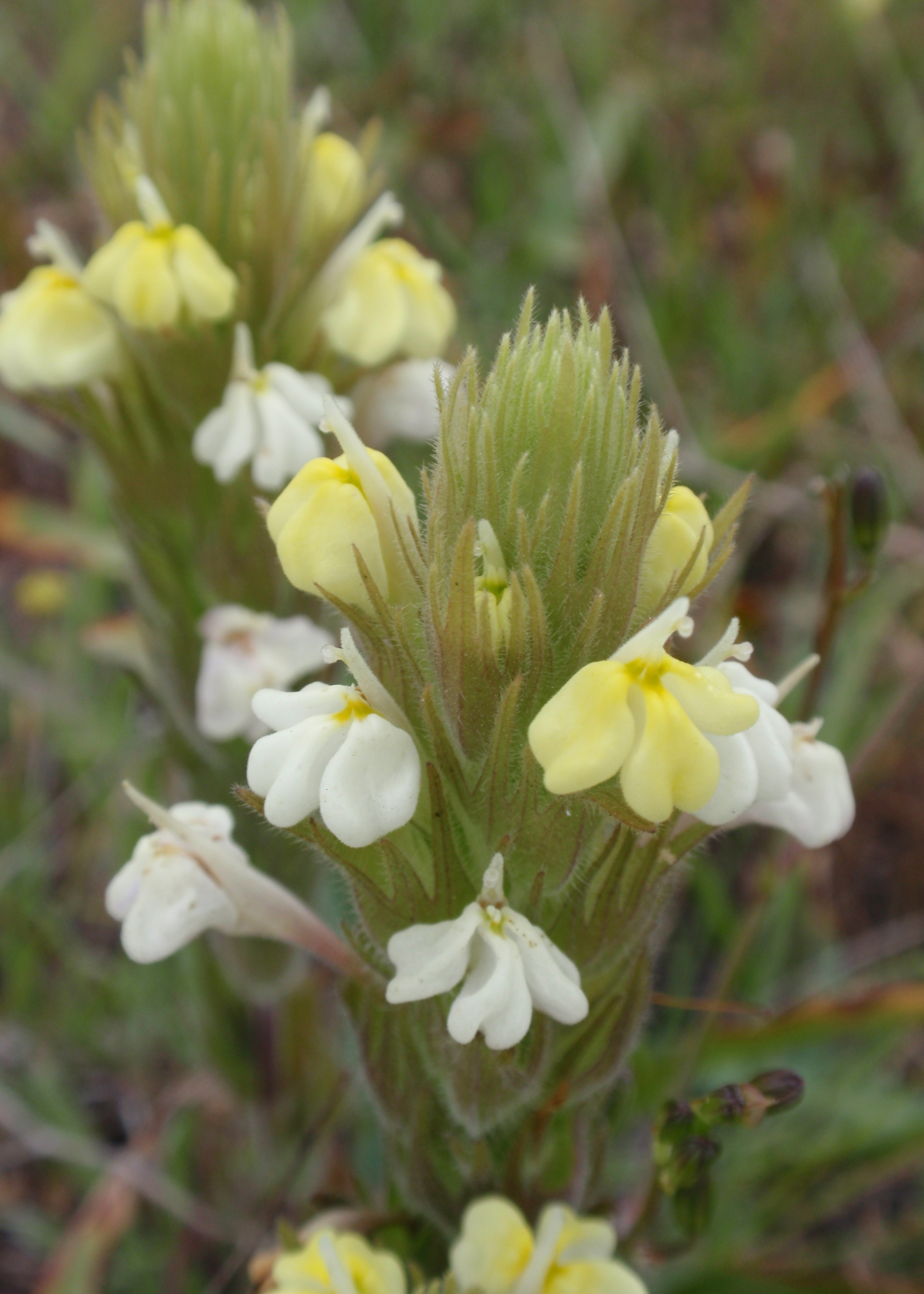

Scientific classification
- Kingdom: Plantae
- Clade: Tracheophytes
- Clade: Angiosperms
- Clade: Eudicots
- Clade: Asterids
- Order: Lamiales
- Family: Orobanchaceae
- Genus: Castilleja
- Species: C. rubicundula

Binomial name
- Castilleja rubicundula (Jepson) Chuang & Heckard

Synonyms
- Orthocarpus rubicundula

= Castilleja rubicundula =

Species of flowering plant

Castilleja rubicundula is a species of Indian paintbrush known by the common name cream sacs. It is native to northern California and southwestern Oregon. It is found in coastal and inland grasslands.

== Description ==
Castilleja rubicundula is a hairy, glandular annual growing to about half a meter in height, the stem leafy with lance-shaped foliage.

It produces a terminal inflorescence and sometimes branches off several more inflorescences. The white, pink, yellow, or bicolored flowers are divided into usually three pouches, making them look inflated. Each pouch is about a centimeter wide and half a centimeter deep. Each flower has a beak extending about half a centimeter above the pouches.

The fruit is a capsule containing tiny seeds less than a millimeter long. Under magnification the seed's honeycomb-patterned coat is visible.

=== Subspecies ===
Subspecies and varieties include:

- Castilleja rubicundula ssp. lithospermoides
- Castilleja rubicundula ssp. rubicundula — endemic to the Sacramento Valley, California.
- Castilleja rubicundula var. rubicundula

== Distribution and habitat ==
This annual wildflower is native to northern California, and into southwestern Oregon. It lives on coastal and inland grasslands.
