= Castilleja ecuadorensis =

Conservation status
- Vulnerable (IUCN 3.1)

Scientific classification
- Kingdom: Plantae
- Clade: Tracheophytes
- Clade: Angiosperms
- Clade: Eudicots
- Clade: Asterids
- Order: Lamiales
- Family: Orobanchaceae
- Genus: Castilleja
- Species: C. ecuadorensis

Binomial name
- Castilleja ecuadorensis N.H.Holmgren

Plant species in the broomrape family

Castilleja ecuadorensis is a species of plant in the paintbrush genus (Castilleja), part of the broomrape family (Orobanchaceae). It is endemic to Ecuador where it grows at very high elevations, above 3,000 meters, in wet meadows. It was only scientifically described as a species in 1984.

== Description ==
Castilleja ecuadorensis is a skinny, short lived perennial plant that usually grows 15–30 centimeters tall, but occasionally may reach 35 cm. It usually has one, two, or less often three stems that grow straight upwards from a narrow root crown and have a purple tinge. The roots are simple and fiberous.

The leaves are linear, long and narrow like grass, with the lower ones having smooth edges and no lobes, but the upper ones having one or two pairs of short side lobes. Leaves have fine hairs that are mostly found on the edges and midvein. They normally range in length from 1.5 to 2.5 cm, but will sometimes reach 3 cm.

The flowers are in a raceme that is somewhat sparsely puberulent, covered in fine, short, erect hairs. This especially so on the veins and edges of the bracts and the sepals. The bracts strongly resemble the leaves lower down on the plant and become both shorter and wider towards the top. The sepals are 15 to 23 millimeters long, but often do not exceed 19 mm. Their color is predominately green, but have a purple tinge especially on its veins. The petals are united into a tube for 6–14 mm of its total 14–27 mm length. This corolla is green, pale green and fuzzy on its back. The lower lip is very small with three inwards curving tooth shapes.

== Taxonomy ==
Castilleja ecuadorensis was scientifically described and named in a paper published by Noel H. Holmgren in 1984. It has no synonyms. It classified as a Castilleja in the family Orobanchaceae.

== Range and habitat ==
This plant species is endemic to Ecuador in the southern part of the country on the páramos, high wet moorlands. There are six known populations. It grows in El Cajas National Park and may also grow in Podocarpus National Park. Locations in Azuay Province recorded by Holmgren in 1984 include 45 kilometers west-northwest of Cuenca around Laguna Toreador at 3,950 meters, 25 km from Cuenca on the road to Cajas around 3,500 m, and a páramo near Toreador between Molleturo and Quinoas between 3,810 and 3,930 m. To the south in Loja Province it was found 26.2 km north of Saraguro at 3,060 m and also along the Saraguro to Tenta road.

It grows in wet meadows from 3,000 to 4,000 meters.

=== Conservation ===
The IUCN evaluated Castilleja ecuadorensis in 1984 and rated it as vulnerable on their Red List. The only specific threat to the species is habitat destruction.
