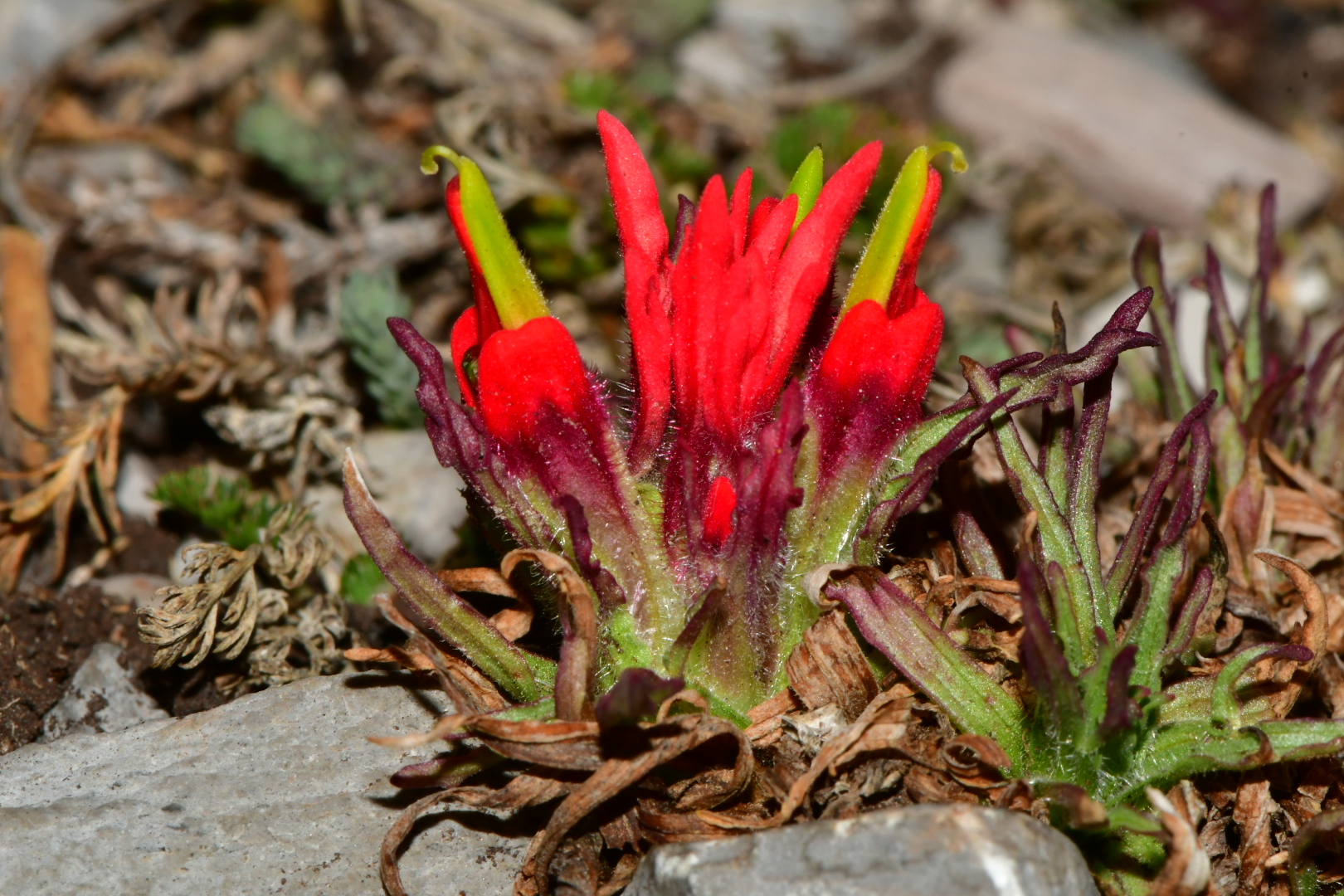

Scientific classification
- Kingdom: Plantae
- Clade: Tracheophytes
- Clade: Angiosperms
- Clade: Eudicots
- Clade: Asterids
- Order: Lamiales
- Family: Orobanchaceae
- Genus: Castilleja
- Species: C. bella

Binomial name
- Castilleja bella Standl.

= Castilleja bella =

Arteaga Indian paintbrush

Species of flowering plant

Castilleja bella is a species in the Castilleja genus known by the common name Arteaga Indian paintbrush (Spanish: Pincel de Indio de Arteaga). It is native to northeastern Mexico, primarily the states of Nuevo León and Coahuila, where it grows in montane habitats.

== Description ==
Castilleja bella is a perennial, herbaceous, and hemiparasitic angiosperm that grows in montane habitats above altitudes of 2,500 meters above sea level. It has erect stems that are typically under 10 cm in height, and its inflorescences consists of bracts in shades of bright red.

== Image gallery ==
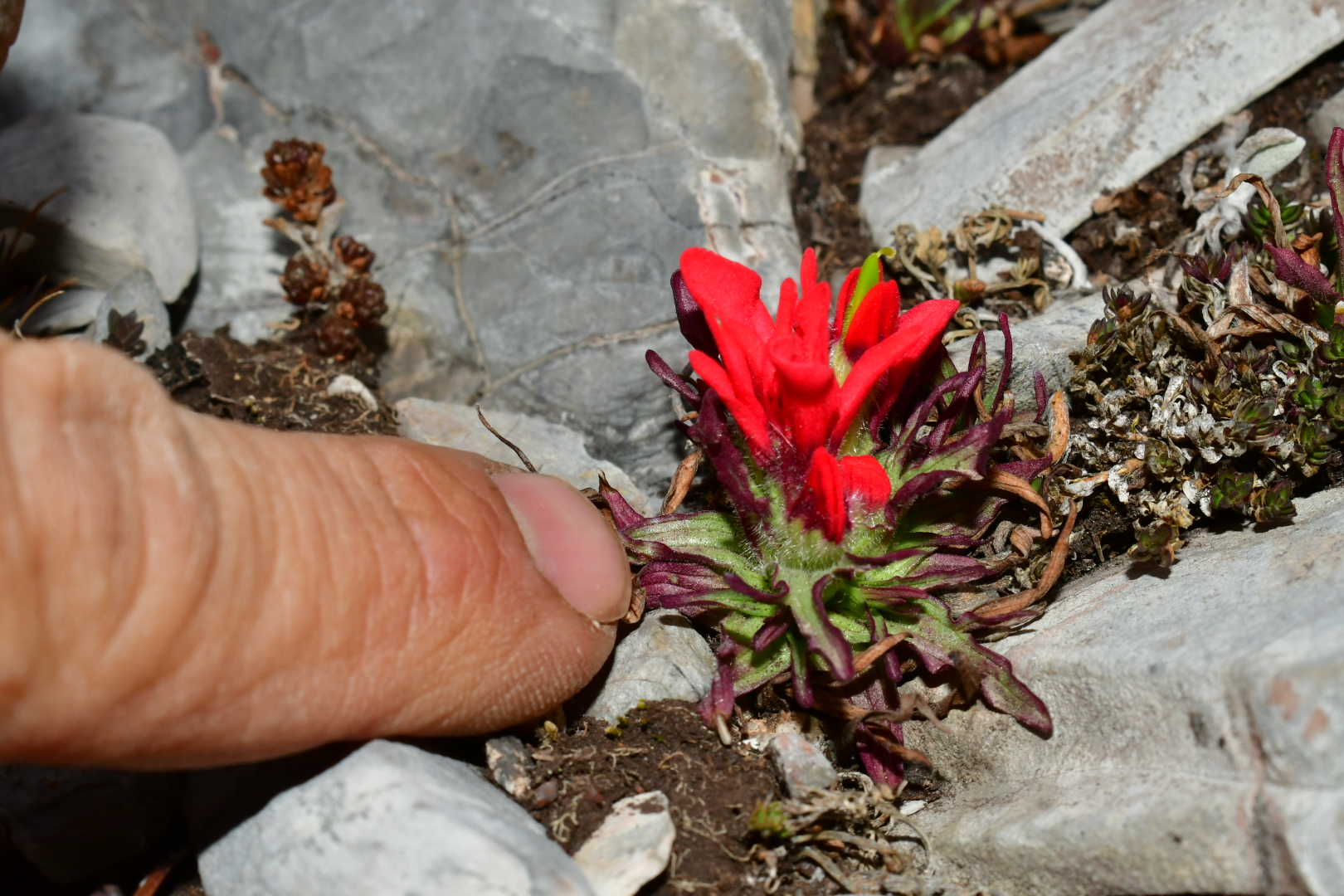
Castilleja bella is an especially low-growing member of the Castilleja genus.

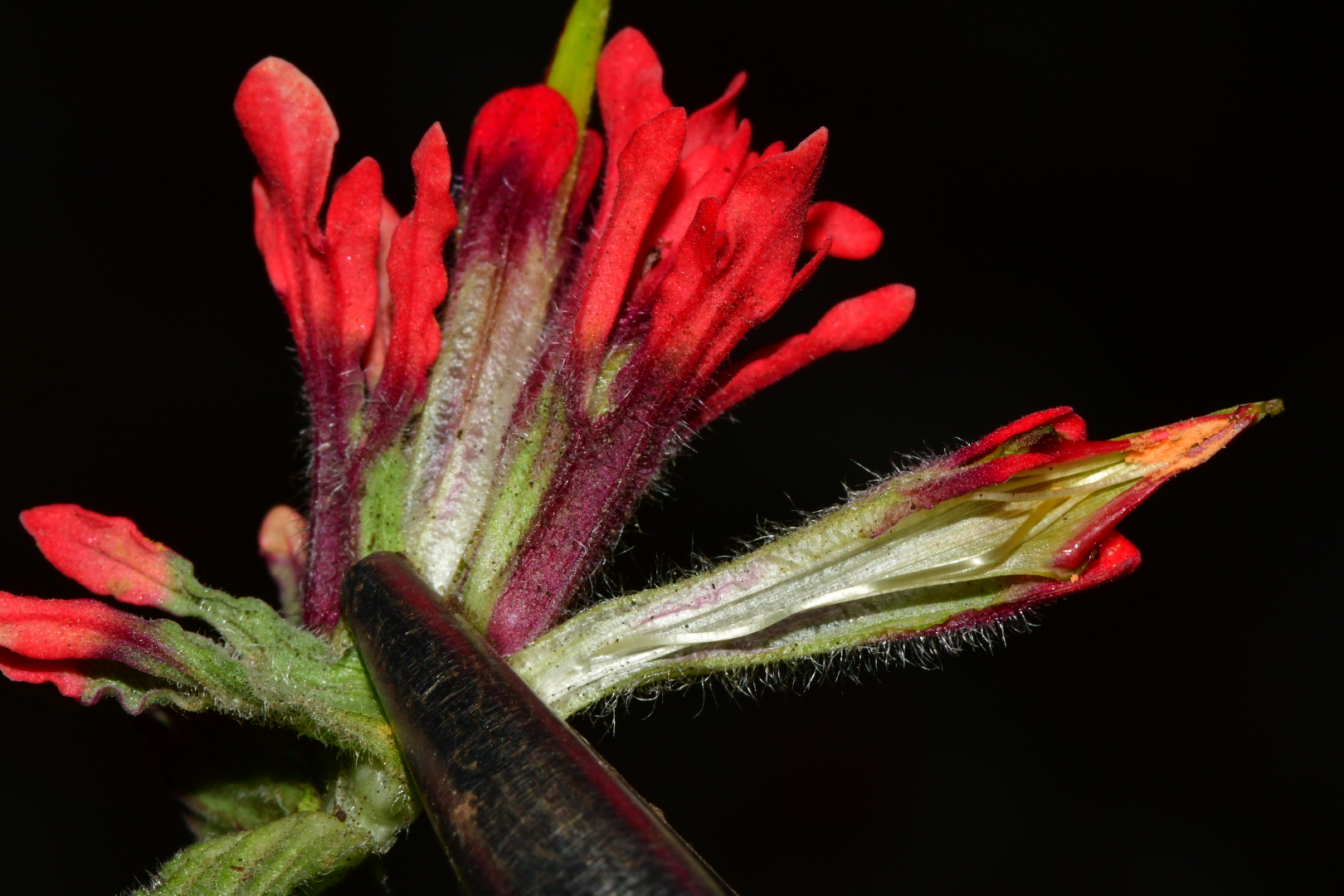
Castilleja bella species has hirsute, brightly colored bracts.

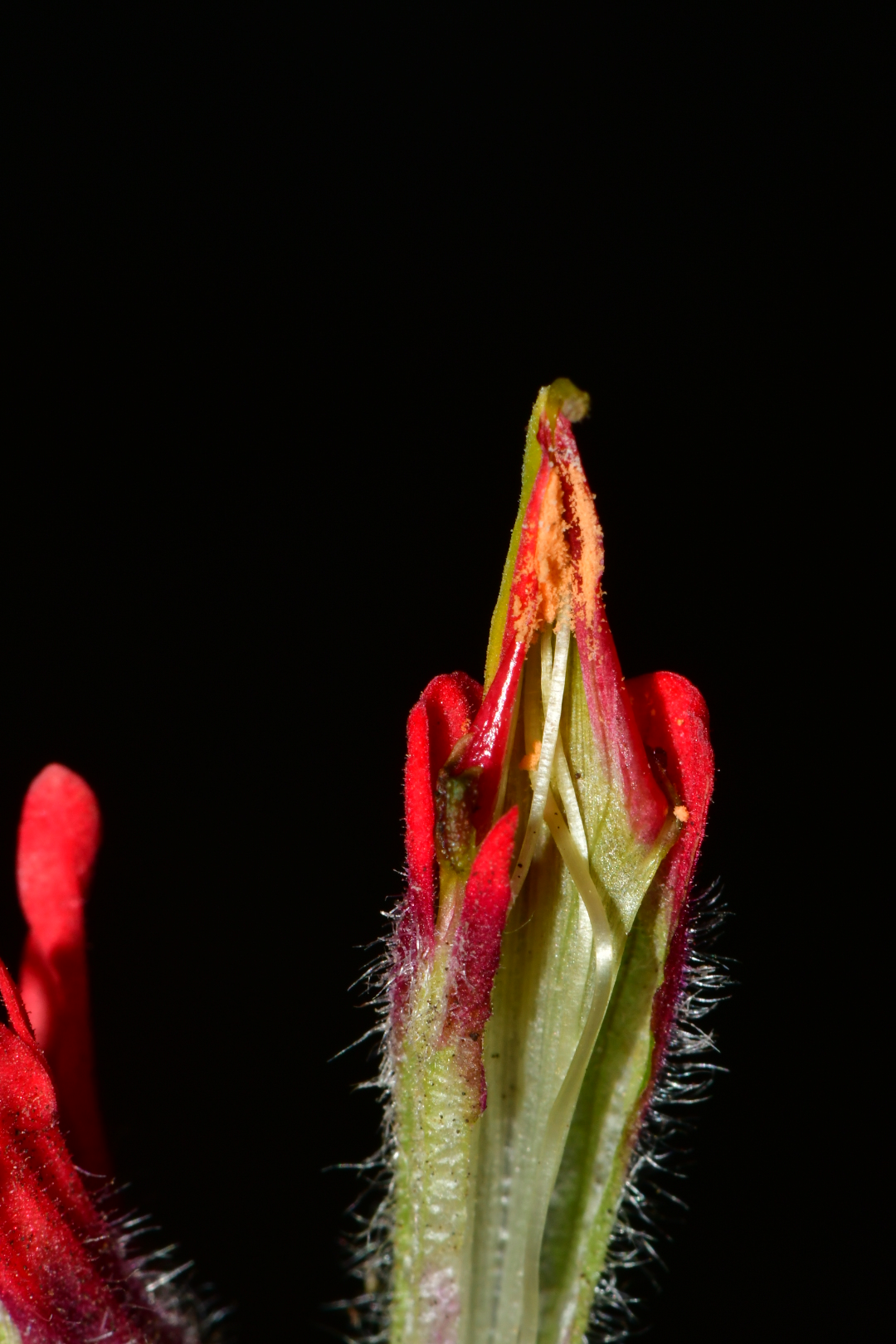
Castilleja bella bracts and flower parts.

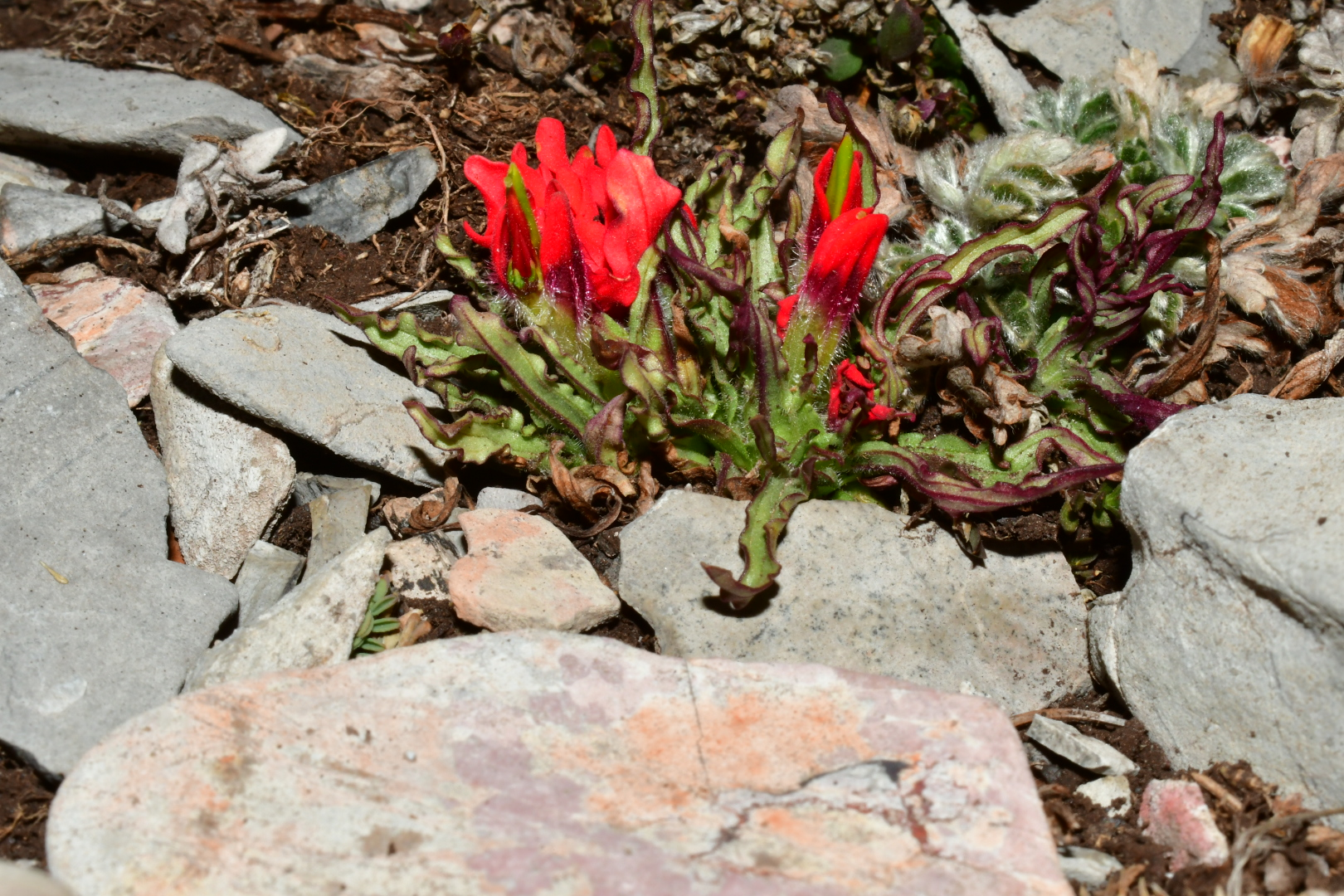
Castilleja bella grows in rocky, high-elevation habitats.

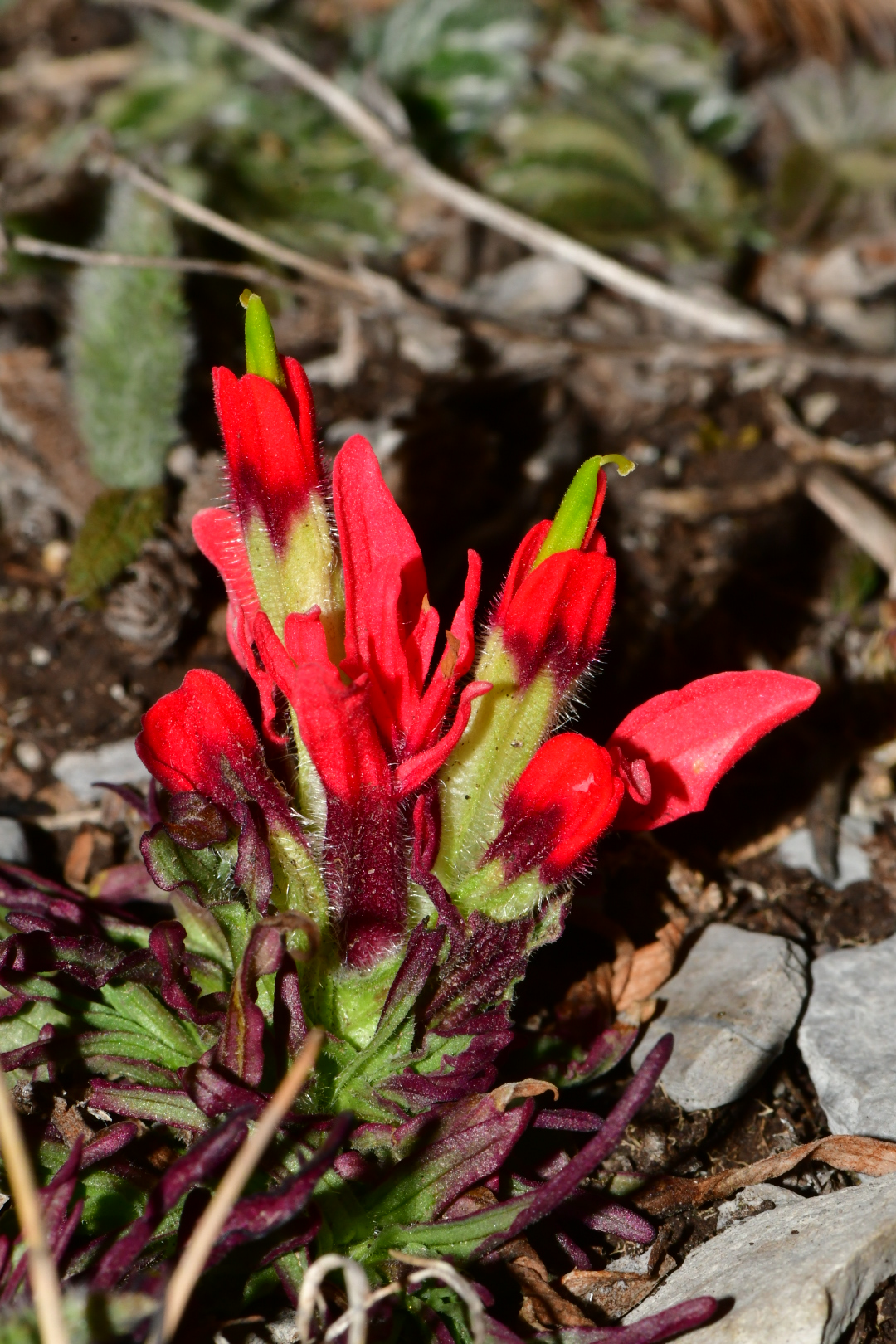
Castilleja bella bracts tightly envelope its flower parts.

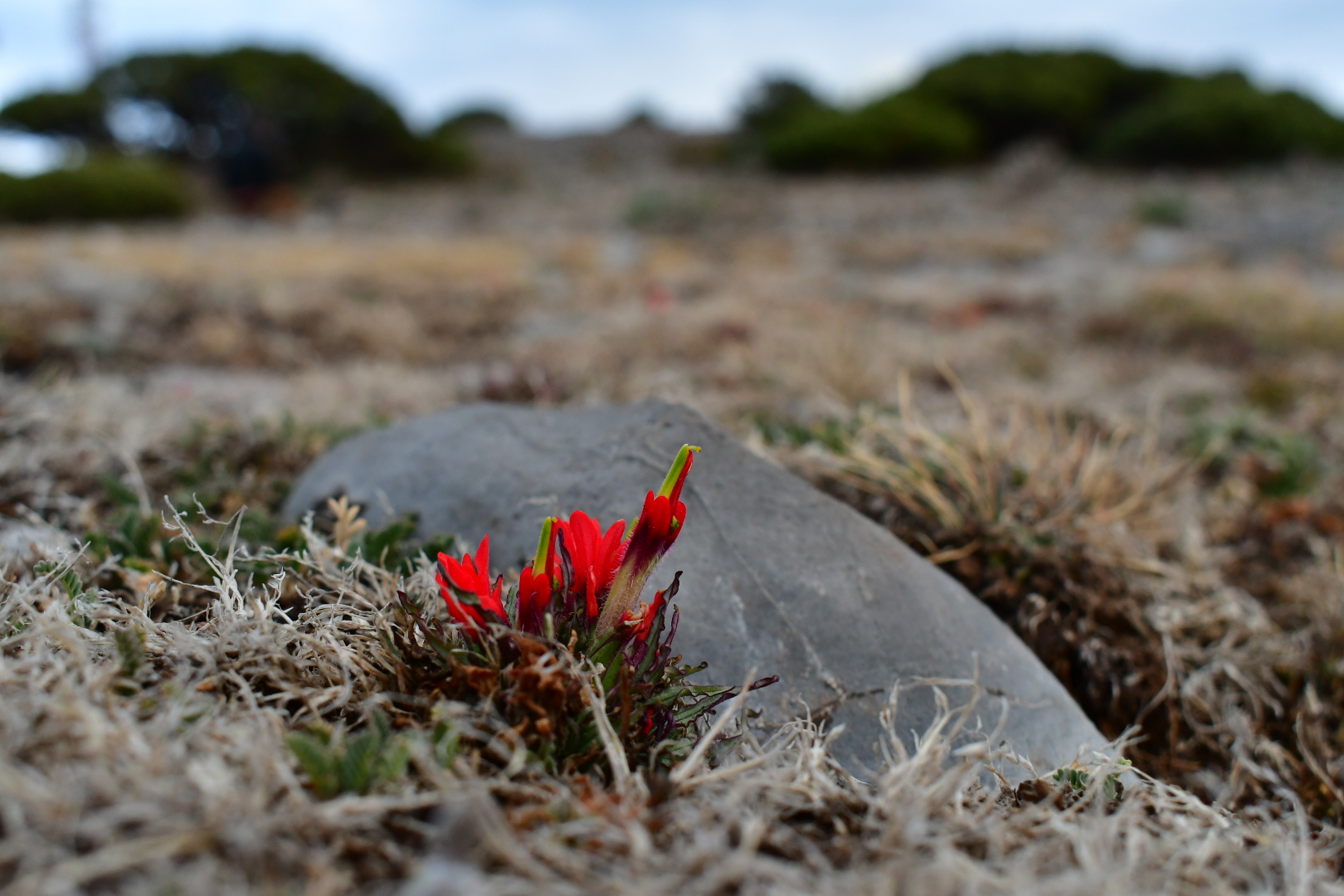
Castilleja bella on Cerro El Potosí.
