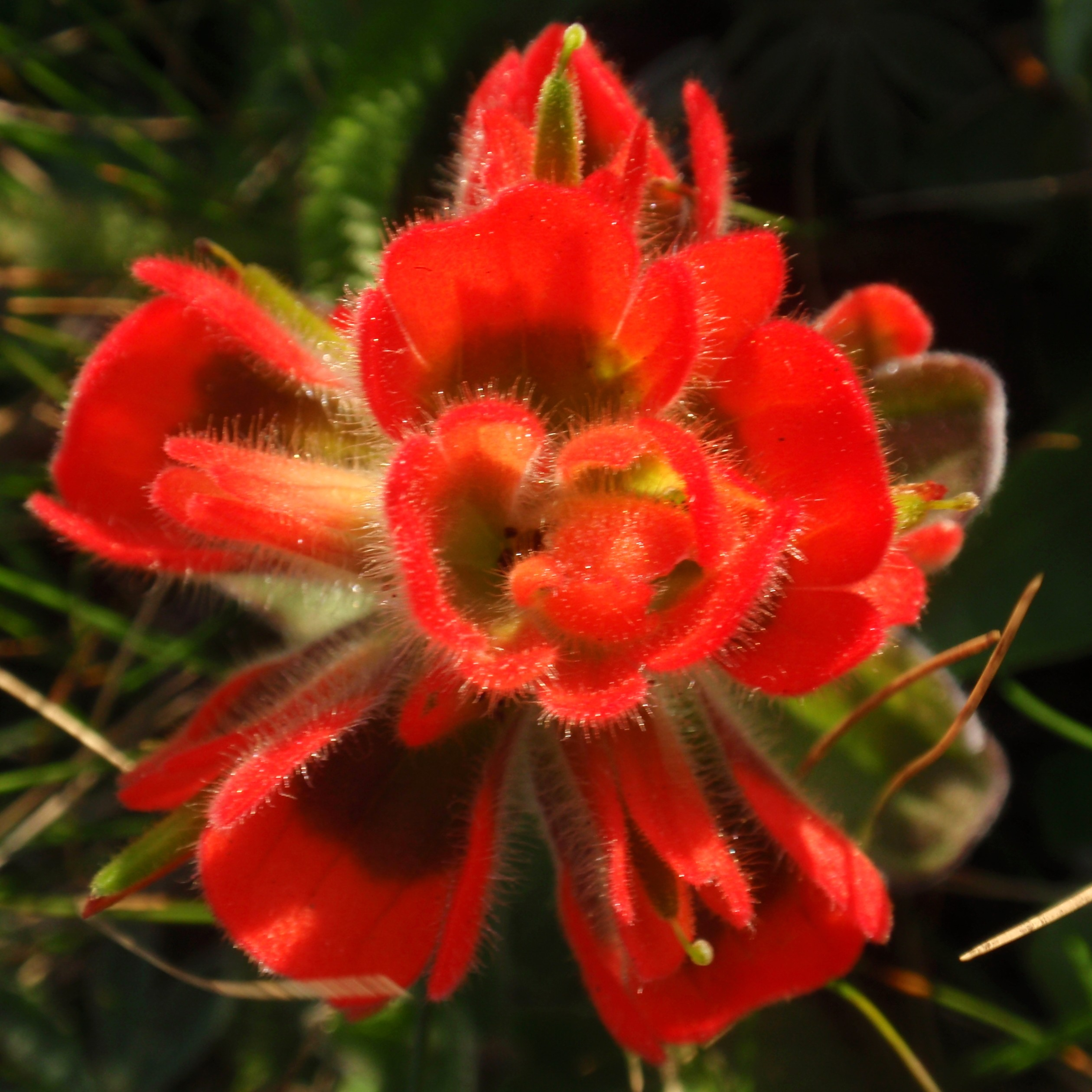

Conservation status
- Imperiled (NatureServe)

Scientific classification
- Kingdom: Plantae
- Clade: Tracheophytes
- Clade: Angiosperms
- Clade: Eudicots
- Clade: Asterids
- Order: Lamiales
- Family: Orobanchaceae
- Genus: Castilleja
- Species: C. mendocinensis

Binomial name
- Castilleja mendocinensis (Eastw.) Pennell

= Castilleja mendocinensis =

Species of flowering plant

Castilleja mendocinensis is a species of Indian paintbrush known by the common name Mendocino Coast Indian paintbrush.

It is endemic to the coastline of Mendocino County, California, where it grows in coastal sage scrub habitat. It is also known from isolated occurrences in Humboldt County.

== Description ==
Castilleja mendocinensis is a heavily branching, spreading perennial herb growing up to about 60 centimeters long. It is coated in bristles and light-colored rough hairs, giving it a gray-green color. The leaves are fleshy and rounded or oval in shape, and not more than about 2 centimeters long.

The inflorescence is made up of layers of lobed bracts which are greenish at the base and tipped with shades of bright orange-red to red. Between the bracts emerge the hairy, tubular flowers which are greenish or yellowish and sometimes red-tinted.

The fruit is a capsule up to 2 centimeters in length.
