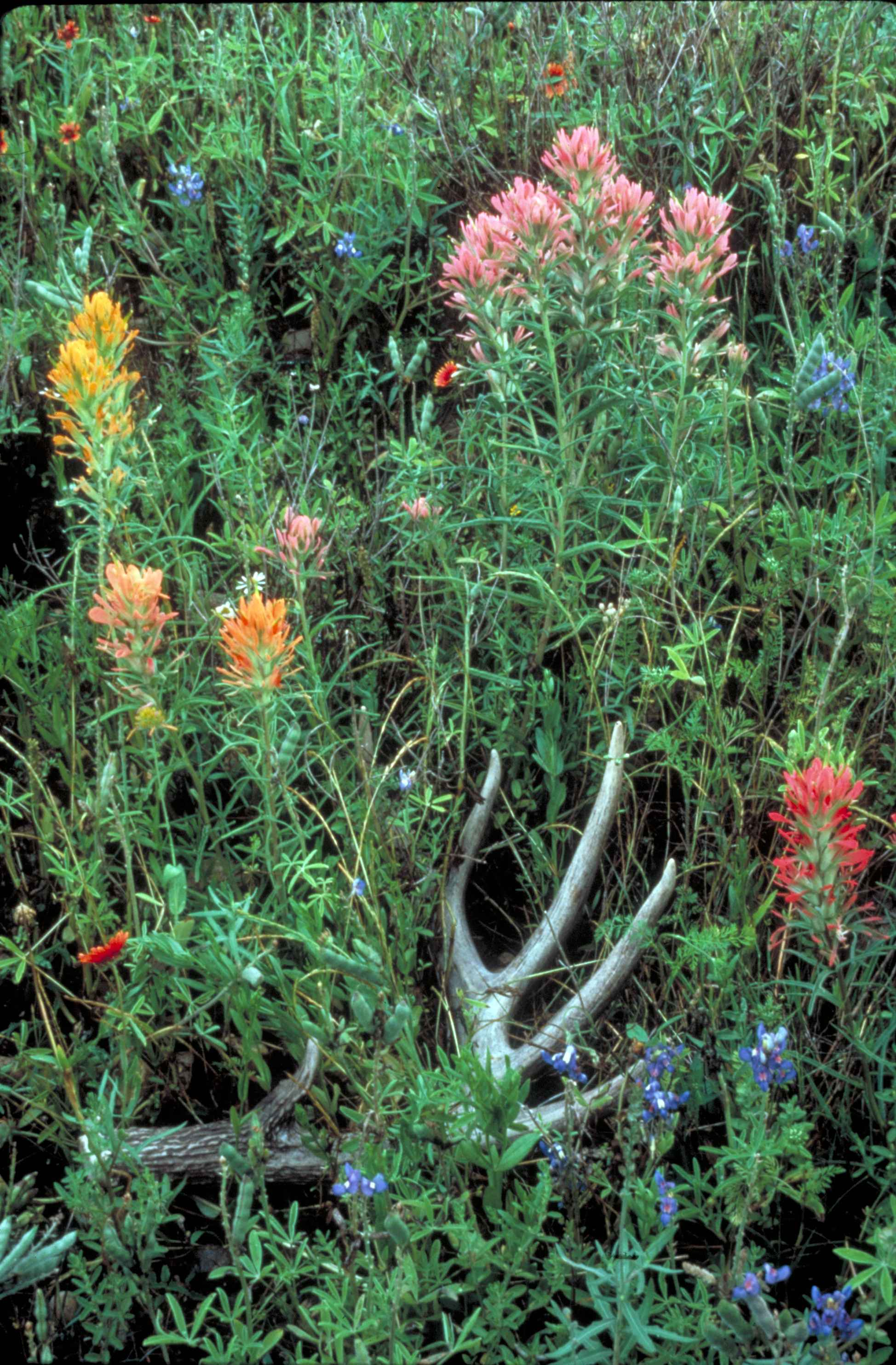

Scientific classification
- Kingdom: Plantae
- Clade: Tracheophytes
- Clade: Angiosperms
- Clade: Eudicots
- Clade: Asterids
- Order: Lamiales
- Family: Orobanchaceae
- Genus: Castilleja
- Species: C. purpurea

Binomial name
- Castilleja purpurea (Nutt.) G.Don

Synonyms
- Castilleja williamsii Pennell; Euchroma purpurea Nutt.

= Castilleja purpurea =

Species of flowering plant

Castilleja purpurea, known as downy Indian paintbrush, is a wildflower native to Texas, Oklahoma, Kansas, and Missouri. The flowers of various subspecies display a wide variety of forms and colors. Blooms may be white, pale yellow, peach, or tinged with pink and the foliage may be green or purple.

The subspecies of C. purpurea are argued to be their own species in the genus Castilleja.
