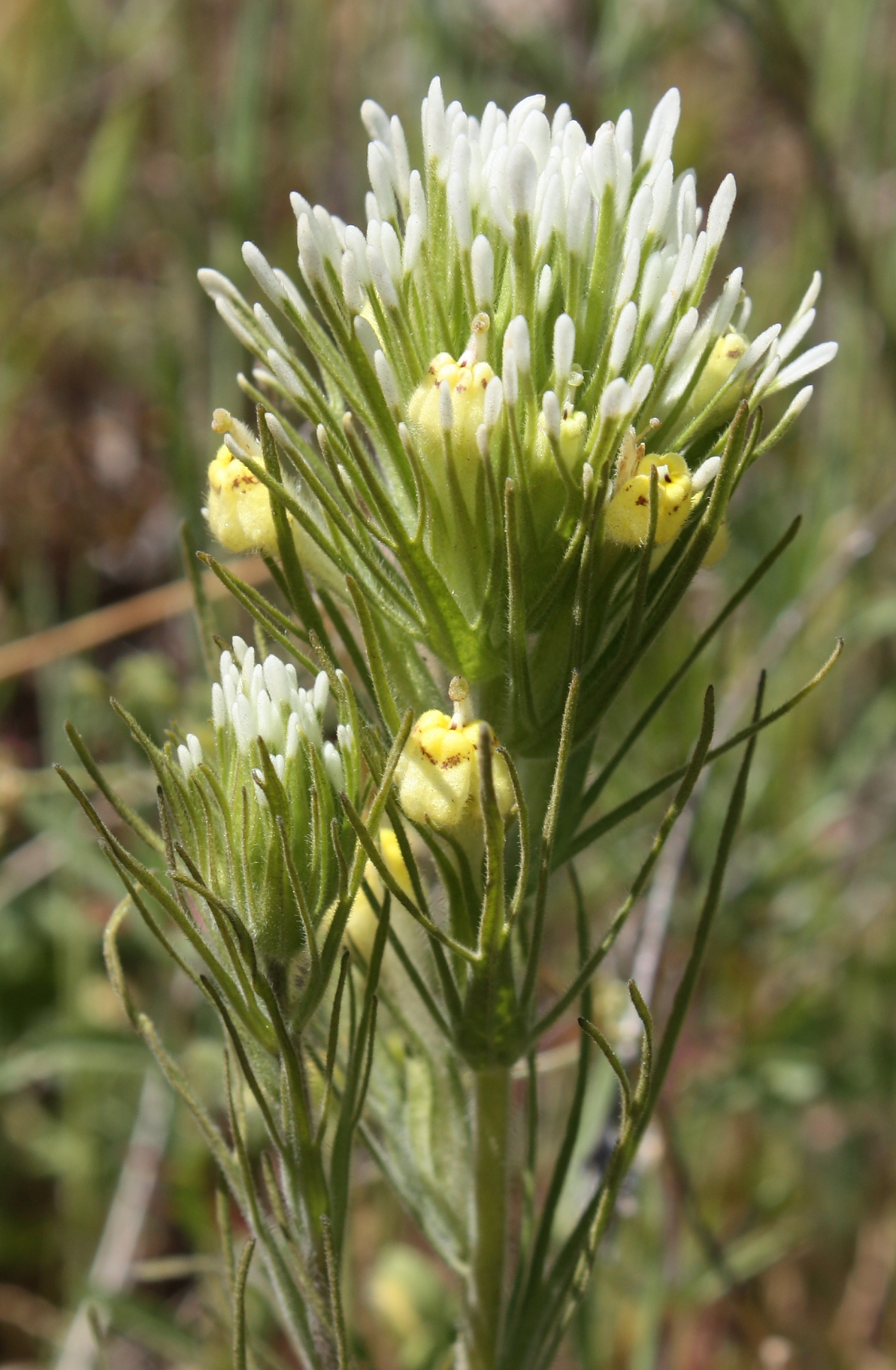

Conservation status
- Apparently Secure (NatureServe)

Scientific classification
- Kingdom: Plantae
- Clade: Tracheophytes
- Clade: Angiosperms
- Clade: Eudicots
- Clade: Asterids
- Order: Lamiales
- Family: Orobanchaceae
- Genus: Castilleja
- Species: C. lineariloba

Binomial name
- Castilleja lineariloba (Benth.) T.I.Chuang & Heckard, 1991

Synonyms
- Orthocarpus linearilobus Benth. (1849); Orthocarpus mariposanus Congdon (1900)

= Castilleja lineariloba =

Plant species in the broomrape family

Castilleja lineariloba is a species of Indian paintbrush known by the common name thin-lobed owl’s clover that is endemic to the grasslands of the Sierra Nevada foothills in California.

== Description ==
Castilleja lineariloba is an annual herb growing up to about 45 centimeters tall. The leaves are up to 5.7 centimeters long and have three to nine spreading lobes. The large inflorescence is made up of many greenish bracts tipped in white, yellow, or pale purple. Between the bracts are the pouched, lipped flowers, which may be white, yellow, or rose in color, and sometimes speckled with darker shades.
