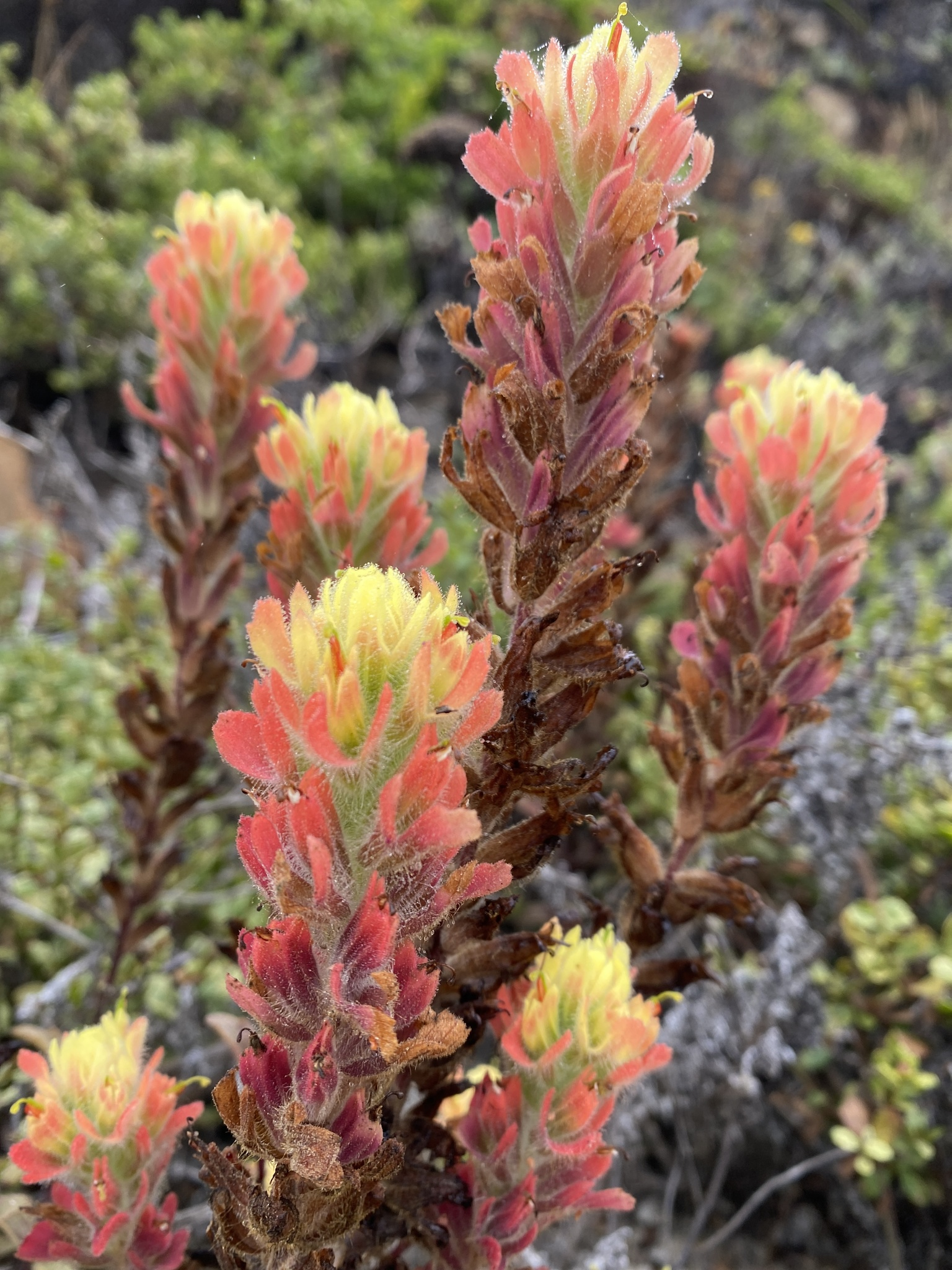

Scientific classification
- Kingdom: Plantae
- Clade: Tracheophytes
- Clade: Angiosperms
- Clade: Eudicots
- Clade: Asterids
- Order: Lamiales
- Family: Orobanchaceae
- Genus: Castilleja
- Species: C. wightii

Binomial name
- Castilleja wightii Elmer, 1906

= Castilleja wightii =

California wildflower

Castilleja wightii is a species of perennial herb native to coastal northern and central California in North America. It is commonly found in coastal scrub below 300 feet (91 m) elevation. The bract colors range from red to yellow, with some mixed-color populations.
