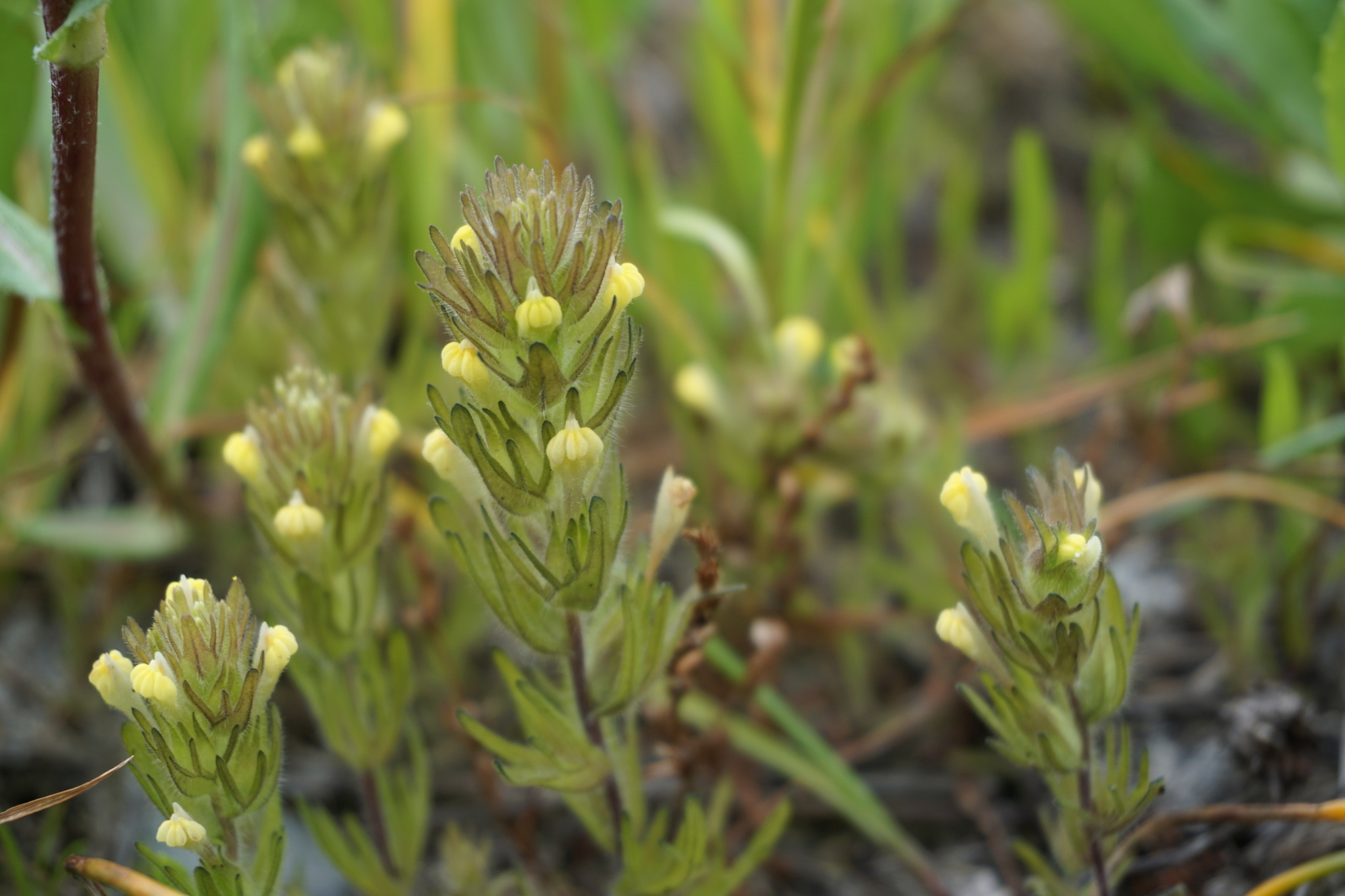

Conservation status
- Critically Imperiled (NatureServe)

- Endangered (COSEWIC)

Scientific classification
- Kingdom: Plantae
- Clade: Tracheophytes
- Clade: Angiosperms
- Clade: Eudicots
- Clade: Asterids
- Order: Lamiales
- Family: Orobanchaceae
- Genus: Castilleja
- Species: C. victoriae

Binomial name
- Castilleja victoriae Fairbarns & J.M.Egger

= Victoria's owl-clover =

Species of plant

Castilleja victoriae is a species of flowering plant in the broomrape family known by the common names Victoria's owl-clover and Victoria's paintbrush.

== Distribution and range ==
Castilleja victoriae is endemic to a small region of southeastern Vancouver Island in British Columbia (near its namesake city of Victoria) and a single site in the San Juan Islands of Washington State. There are four or less extant populations in existence.

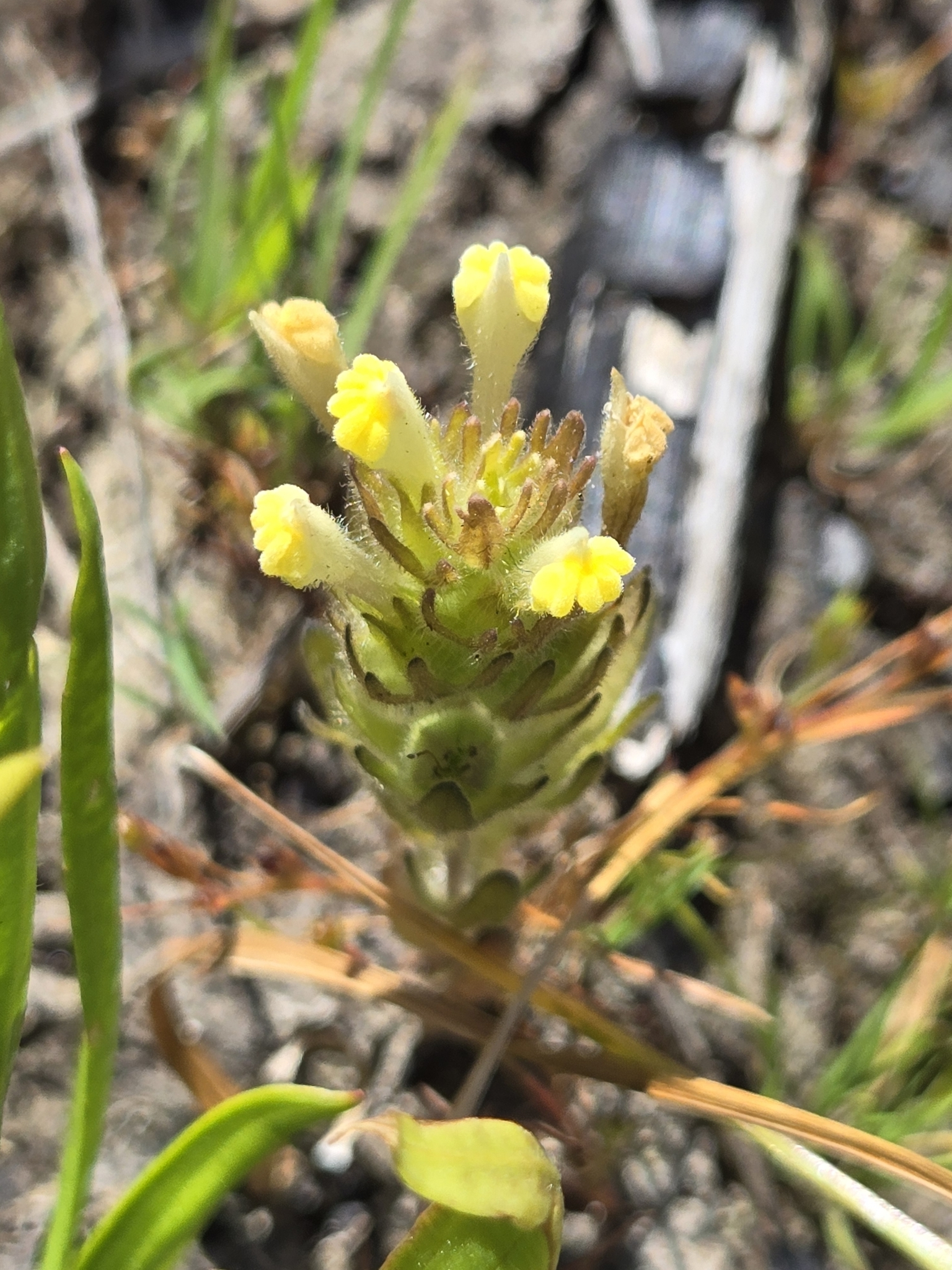
Close up of Castilleja victoriae flowers

== Description ==
Stem leaves are alternate, lobed, and hairy, with no basal rosette. Upper leaves are deeply lobed, becoming purple-tipped floral bracts. Sepals form a five-lobed calyx, with petals forming two-lipped flowers measuring 10-18mm in length. Lower calyx lips are yellow with white tips, and upper lips are a creamy white. Fruits are brown capsules with two cells that split when ripe to reveal 30-70 seeds.

== Habitat ==
Castilleja victoriae is found exclusively in vernal pools and seeps associated with Garry oak ecosystems within 50 metres of the coast. Four of its historical occurrences have been extirpated since the turn of the last century due to habitat loss and degradation.
