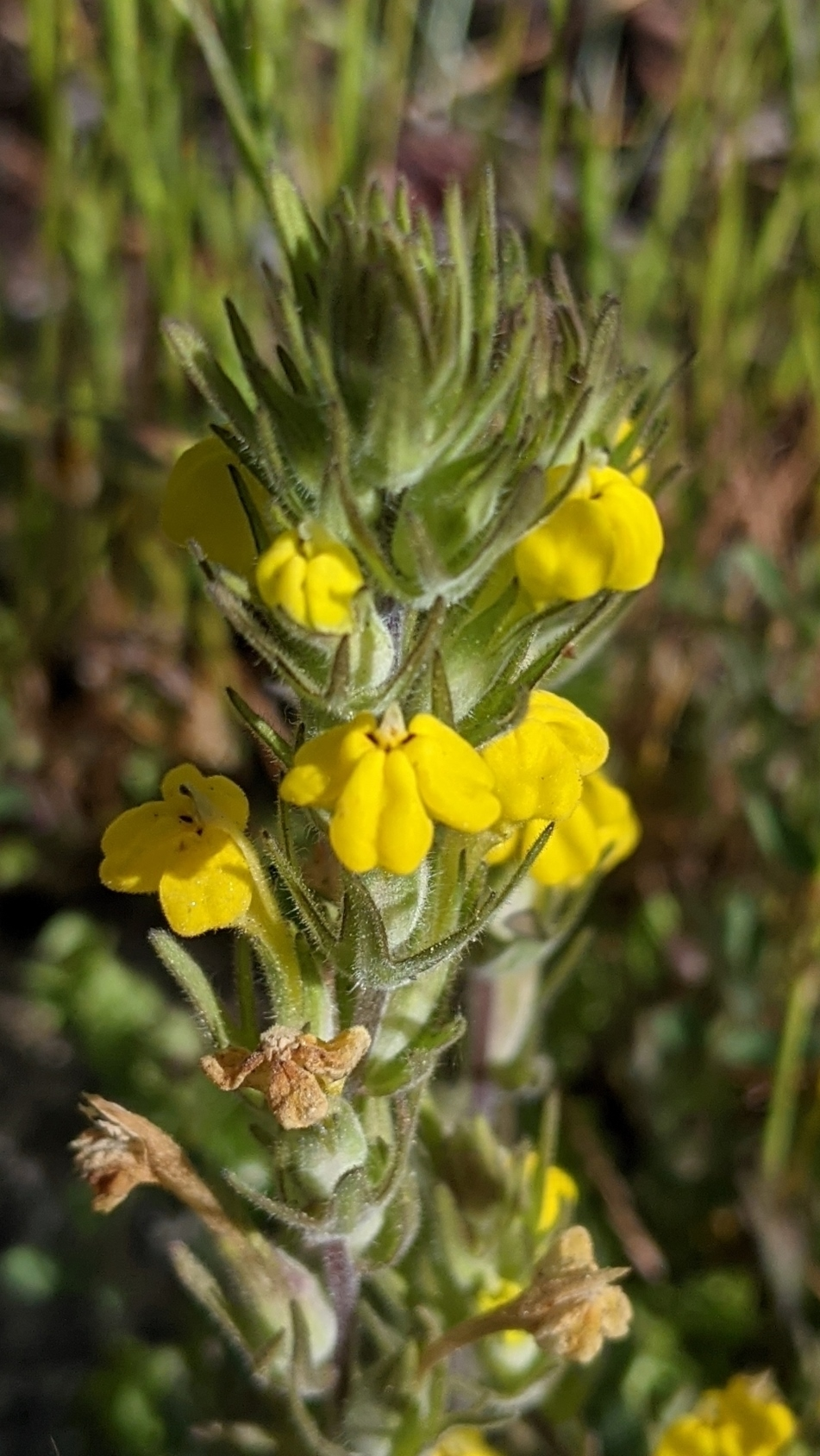

Scientific classification
- Kingdom: Plantae
- Clade: Tracheophytes
- Clade: Angiosperms
- Clade: Eudicots
- Clade: Asterids
- Order: Lamiales
- Family: Orobanchaceae
- Genus: Castilleja
- Species: C. lacera

Binomial name
- Castilleja lacera (Benth.) T.I.Chuang & Heckard

= Castilleja lacera =

Species of flowering plant

Castilleja lacera is a species of Indian paintbrush known by the common name cutleaf Indian paintbrush.

It is native to California and southern Oregon, where it grows in grassy mountain and foothill habitat. This is an annual herb coated in glandular hairs and growing up to about 40 centimeters tall. It has linear and lance-shaped leaves up to 5 centimeters long. The inflorescence is made up of hairy green bracts and bright yellow pouched flowers.
