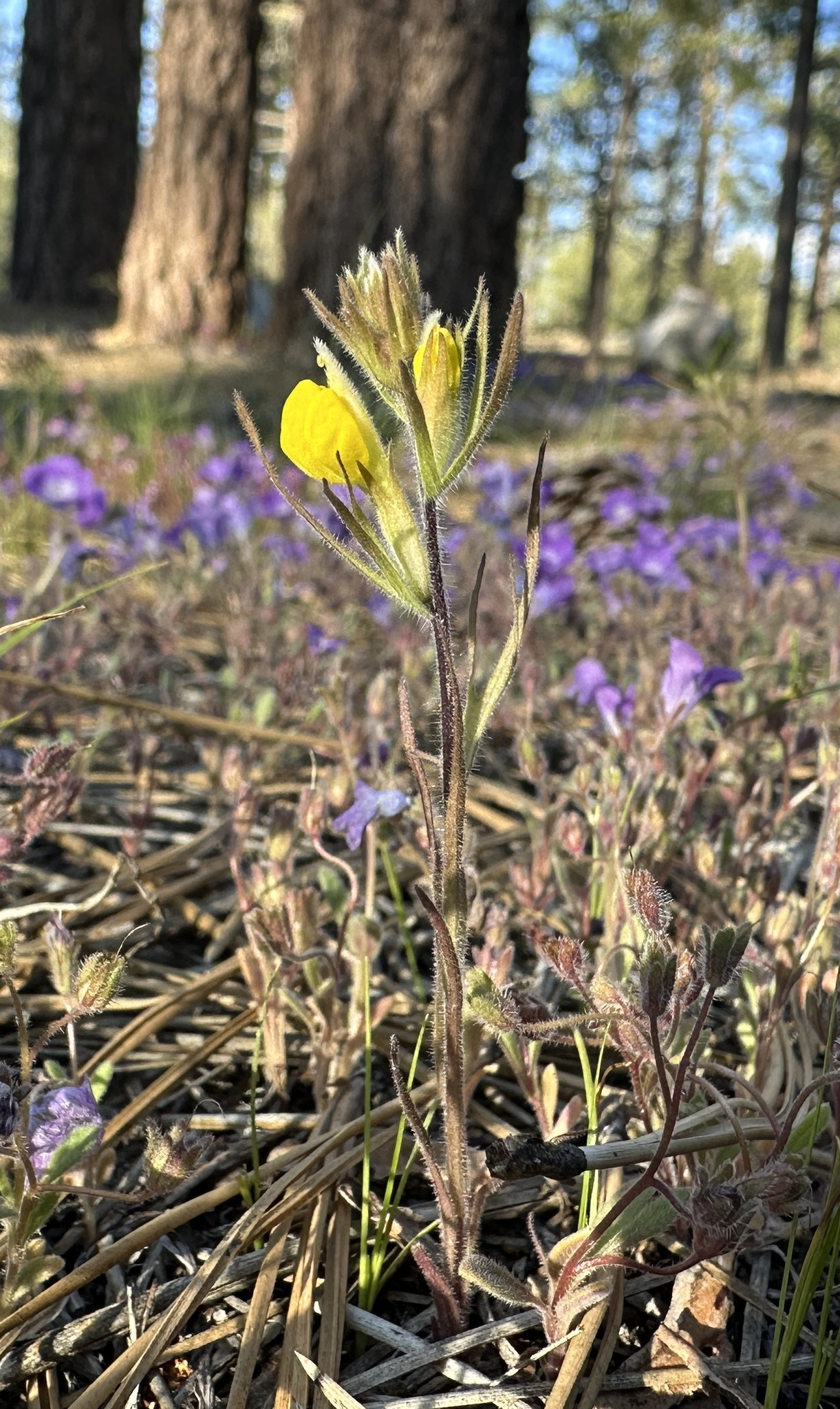
- Castilleja lasiorhyncha San Bernardino Mountains owl's-clover, blooming with purple Phacelia exilis, Transverse Range phacelia

Conservation status
- Imperiled (NatureServe)

Scientific classification
- Kingdom: Plantae
- Clade: Tracheophytes
- Clade: Angiosperms
- Clade: Eudicots
- Clade: Asterids
- Order: Lamiales
- Family: Orobanchaceae
- Genus: Castilleja
- Species: C. lasiorhyncha

Binomial name
- Castilleja lasiorhyncha (A.Gray) T.I.Chuang & Heckard

= Castilleja lasiorhyncha =

Species of flowering plant

Castilleja lasiorhyncha is a species of Indian paintbrush is endemic to southern California known by the common name San Bernardino Mountains Indian paintbrush. Most of the plant's range is in the San Bernardino Mountains, where it grows in forests and meadows.

Castilleja lasiorhyncha only existing populations are in San Bernardino County and possibly San Diego County, with historical occurrences also known from Riverside County.

== Description ==
This wildflower is an annual herb usually not exceeding 20 centimeters in height. Its stem and foliage are coated in woolly glandular hairs. The inflorescence is a loose, narrow array of green bracts and larger flowers, each with rounded, pouched bright yellow petals and a hairy whitish beak.
