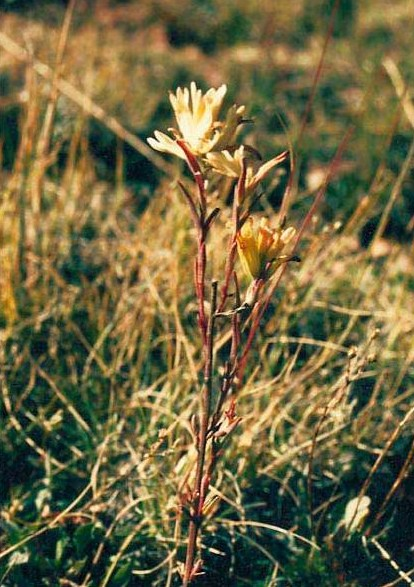

Conservation status
- Critically Imperiled (NatureServe)

Scientific classification
- Kingdom: Plantae
- Clade: Tracheophytes
- Clade: Angiosperms
- Clade: Eudicots
- Clade: Asterids
- Order: Lamiales
- Family: Orobanchaceae
- Genus: Castilleja
- Species: C. kaibabensis

Binomial name
- Castilleja kaibabensis N.H.Holmgren 1973

= Castilleja kaibabensis =

Species of flowering plant

Castilleja kaibabensis is a species of flowering plant in the family Orobanchaceae known by the common name Kaibab Plateau Indian paintbrush. It is endemic to the Kaibab Plateau of Coconino County, Arizona, in the United States.

Castilleja kaibabensis is a woody perennial herb with hairy stems and hairy, lance-shaped leaves. The inflorescence contains hairy bracts in shades of yellow and orange. The bract color is variable within and between populations. The bracts are divided into lobes, a characteristic that can help identify the plant. Blooming occurs in July.

Castilleja kaibabensis grows in meadows between stands of spruce, fir, and aspen. The soils, derived from Kaibab limestone, are silty, clayey, or rocky. The plant tends to grow in drier spots in the habitat. It easily colonizes disturbed spots, as well.

Castilleja kaibabensis is one of fourteen Castilleja that occur in the state of Arizona. While the population is apparently stable, the population counts are likely inaccurate because another, similar Castilleja species, Castilleja integra, grows in the same area.
