= Castilleja rubida =

Scientific classification
- Kingdom: Plantae
- Clade: Tracheophytes
- Clade: Angiosperms
- Clade: Eudicots
- Clade: Asterids
- Order: Lamiales
- Family: Orobanchaceae
- Genus: Castilleja
- Species: C. rubida

Binomial name
- Castilleja rubida Piper, 1900

Species of flowering plant

Castilleja rubida, commonly called the purple alpine paintbrush or Wallowa alpine paintbrush, is a species of Indian paintbrush.

== Description ==
This is a short perennial species growing only 5–15 cm tall. Leaves are a dark green or purple, and the bracts are usually purple, burgundy, and lavender, though it is rarely pink or yellowish.

== Range ==
This species is endemic to limestone peaks in the Eagle Cap Wilderness, Oregon, between 2,200-3,000 m (7,217–9842 ft).

== Habitat ==
It grows in rocky slopes, ledges, gravelly flats and alpine ridges.

== Phenology ==
Flowers bloom in July and August.

== Conservation ==
Currently treated as a G2 (Imperiled) on NatureServe, due to restricted range and climate change.
