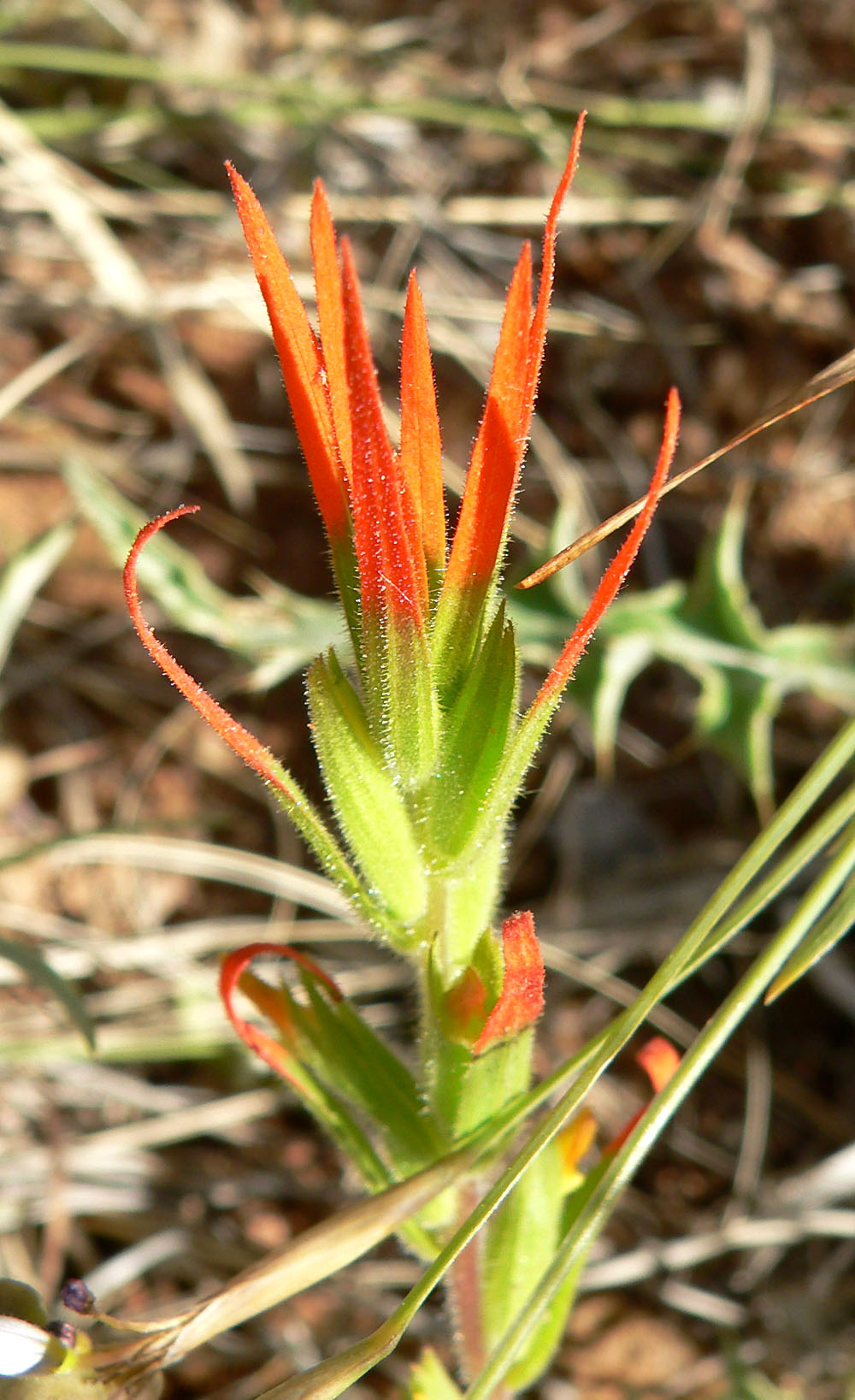
- var. minor

Conservation status
- Least Concern (IUCN 3.1)

- Secure (NatureServe)

Scientific classification
- Kingdom: Plantae
- Clade: Embryophytes
- Clade: Tracheophytes
- Clade: Spermatophytes
- Clade: Angiosperms
- Clade: Eudicots
- Clade: Asterids
- Order: Lamiales
- Family: Orobanchaceae
- Genus: Castilleja
- Species: C. minor

Binomial name
- Castilleja minor (A.Gray) A.Gray

Varieties
- Castilleja minor var. exilis (A.Nelson) J.M.Egger; Castilleja minor var. minor; Castilleja minor var. spiralis (Jeps.) J.M.Egger; Castilleja minor var. stenantha (A.Gray) J.M.Egger

Synonyms
- Castilleja affinis var. minor A.Gray

= Castilleja minor =

Plant species in the broomrape family

Castilleja minor is a species of flowering plant in the family Orobanchaceae known as thread-torch paintbrush or seep paintbrush. It is native to western North America from British Columbia to California and eastward to the Rocky Mountain states.

== Description ==
Castilleja minor is annual plant that typically grows 20–100 centimeters (8–39 in) tall, but occasionally may reach as much as 1.5 meters (4.9 ft). It may have a short taproot or small fibrous root system. The stems are usually without branches and sparsely covered in loose, pilose hairs, ones that are long and straight. Each plant will have either just a few stems or one alone. Sometimes the hairs are shaggy and this characteristic is associated with Castilleja minor var. minor.

The leaves of thread-torch paintbrush vary widely in size, from as short as 2 centimeters or as long as 10 cm, and are just 2–5 millimeters wide near the base. They also vary widely in color from purple to green and may have a little or a significant gray cast. They may be linear, narrow like a blade of grass, or lanceolate, shaped like a spear point with the widest part below the midpoint of the leaf. The leaves have a soft texture and are not divided into lobes.

The inflorescence is narrow, 5–40 centimeters long and just 1–4 cm wide. The flowers are also, long, narrow, and threadlike.

== Taxonomy ==
Castilleja minor was first scientifically described by Asa Gray as a variety of Castilleja affinis as Castilleja affinis var. minor in 1859. In 1876 he published a revision of his previous classification, changing it to a species with its accepted name. It is classified in the genus Castilleja within the family Orobanchaceae.

Castilleja minor has four accepted varieties.

- Castilleja minor var. exilis (A.Nelson) J.M.Egger
- Castilleja minor var. minor
- Castilleja minor var. spiralis (Jeps.) J.M.Egger
- Castilleja minor var. stenantha (A.Gray) J.M.Egger

Castilleja minor has eight synonyms of the species or three of its four varieties.

Table of Synonyms
Name	Year	Rank	Synonym of:	Notes
Castilleja affinis Benth.	1849	species	var. spiralis	= het., nom. illeg.
Castilleja affinis var. minor A.Gray	1859	variety	C. minor	≡ hom.
Castilleja exilis A.Nelson	1904	species	var. exilis	≡ hom.
Castilleja minor subsp. spiralis (Jeps.) T.I.Chuang & Heckard	1992	subspecies	var. spiralis	≡ hom.
Castilleja spiralis Jeps.	1901	species	var. spiralis	≡ hom.
Castilleja stenantha A.Gray	1878	species	var. stenantha	≡ hom.
Castilleja stenantha subsp. spiralis (Jeps.) Munz	1958	subspecies	var. spiralis	≡ hom.
Castilleja stricta Rydb.	1900	species	var. exilis	≡ hom., nom. illeg.
Notes: ≡ homotypic synonym; = heterotypic synonym

=== Names ===
In English it is known by the common names of thread-torch paintbrush, seep paintbrush, or annual paintbrush. In the early 1900s it was also known as small-flowered painted-cup.
