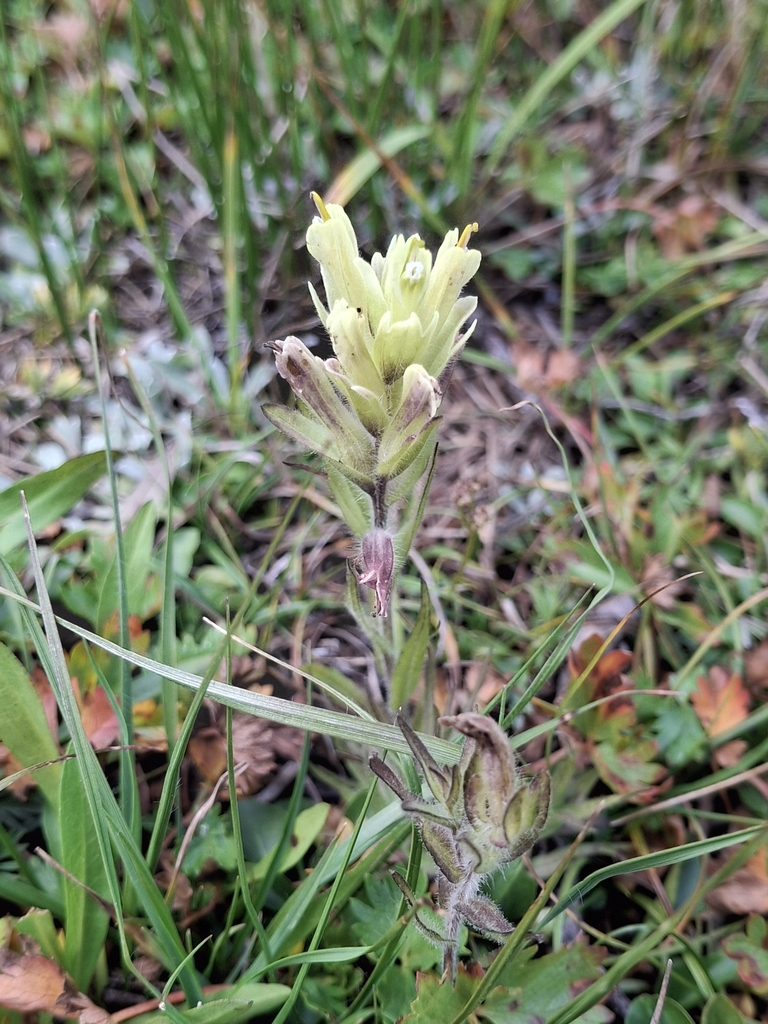

Scientific classification
- Kingdom: Plantae
- Clade: Tracheophytes
- Clade: Angiosperms
- Clade: Eudicots
- Clade: Asterids
- Order: Lamiales
- Family: Orobanchaceae
- Genus: Castilleja
- Species: C. chrysantha

Binomial name
- Castilleja chrysantha Greenm.

= Castilleja chrysantha =

Species of flowering plant

Castilleja chrysantha, commonly called the Wallowa paintbrush, yellowish paintbrush, common Wallowa paintbrush, and yellow Wallowa Indian paintbrush, is a species of paintbrush.

== Description ==
This is a short perennial plant growing 4–12 in (100–300 mm) tall, with larger specimens tending to occur in the Blue Mountains. Leaves are bright green with flower bracts being greenish, yellow, or sometimes purplish. Flowers are longer than the bracts and bright yellow.

== Range ==
This species is endemic to Oregon, primarily found in the Wallowa Mountains, but sparingly occurs in the Blue Mountains west to Wasco County. It has only been recorded in seven counties.

== Habitat ==
This species grows in mesic subalpine or alpine meadows, often near glacial lakes. It can also be found on talus slopes and ridges.

== Etymology ==
The scientific name "chrysantha" comes from Latin meaning "with golden flowers."

== Phenology ==
Flowers can bloom from May to October, but is mostly seen in July and August.

== Taxonomy ==
Because of the strict requirements for this species to grow, not much is known or its variation. Plants that grow in the Blue Mountains grow significantly taller, more erect, and at lower elevations than any populations in the Wallowas. Plants growing on dry talus slopes and talus tend to have strongly purplish bracts and longer hairs, leading to the description of Castilleja ownbeyana. Another taxa called Castilleja wallowensis is now believed to a variable hybrid between this species and C. rhexiifolia, but it is still recognized as a full species by Plants of the World Online (POWO). It also includes the synonym Castilleja indecora.
