= Castilleja salsuginosa =

Conservation status
- Critically Imperiled (NatureServe)

Scientific classification
- Kingdom: Plantae
- Clade: Tracheophytes
- Clade: Angiosperms
- Clade: Eudicots
- Clade: Asterids
- Order: Lamiales
- Family: Orobanchaceae
- Genus: Castilleja
- Species: C. salsuginosa

Binomial name
- Castilleja salsuginosa N.H.Holmgren

Species of flowering plant

Castilleja salsuginosa is a species of flowering plant in the family Orobanchaceae known by the common name Monte Neva Indian paintbrush. It is endemic to Nevada in the United States, where it is known from two populations, one in White Pine County and another in Eureka County. The two occurrences of this plant are located about 83 miles (134 km) apart within the Great Basin. There are only about 275 individuals.

This plant grows in two locations in Nevada's alkaline meadows. It grows around hot springs on salty, wet soils. The local elevation is about 6,000 feet (1,830 m). Other plants in the habitat may include Sarcobatus vermiculatus, Chrysothamnus nauseosus, and Sporobolus airoides.

== Description ==
This plant grows up to about 7.1 inches (18 cm) tall. It is entirely brown or purplish to gray in color. In June and July it bears inflorescences of cream and pink colored bracts and flowers. It is very similar to Castilleja nana. It is possible that it is part of that species.

== Conservation ==
Castilleja salsuginosa is listed as a critically endangered and fully protected species by the State of Nevada. In 2024, the State of Nevada purchased 160 acres of habitat for conservation, containing an estimated 90% of the total population in White Pine County.

This rare plant faces several threats, including livestock, horses, pronghorn, off-road vehicles, geothermal development, land conversion, water diversion, and climate change.
