= Castilleja wallowensis =

Scientific classification
- Kingdom: Plantae
- Clade: Tracheophytes
- Clade: Angiosperms
- Clade: Eudicots
- Clade: Asterids
- Order: Lamiales
- Family: Orobanchaceae
- Genus: Castilleja
- Species: C. wallowensis

Binomial name
- Castilleja wallowensis Pennell

Species of plant

Castilleja wallowensis is a taxonomically controversial species of paintbrush, endemic to the Wallowa Mountains in Oregon.

== Taxonomy ==
This species is still of debatable status. Plants of the World Online (POWO) and International Plant Name Index (IPNI) recognizes this as full species, while other authorities like Flora of North America (FNA) and Oregon Flora treat it as a synonym of Castilleja chrysantha, and possibly a hybrid between that species and Rhexia-leaf Paintbrush (C. rhexxifolia). More study is needed to resolve these relationships.
