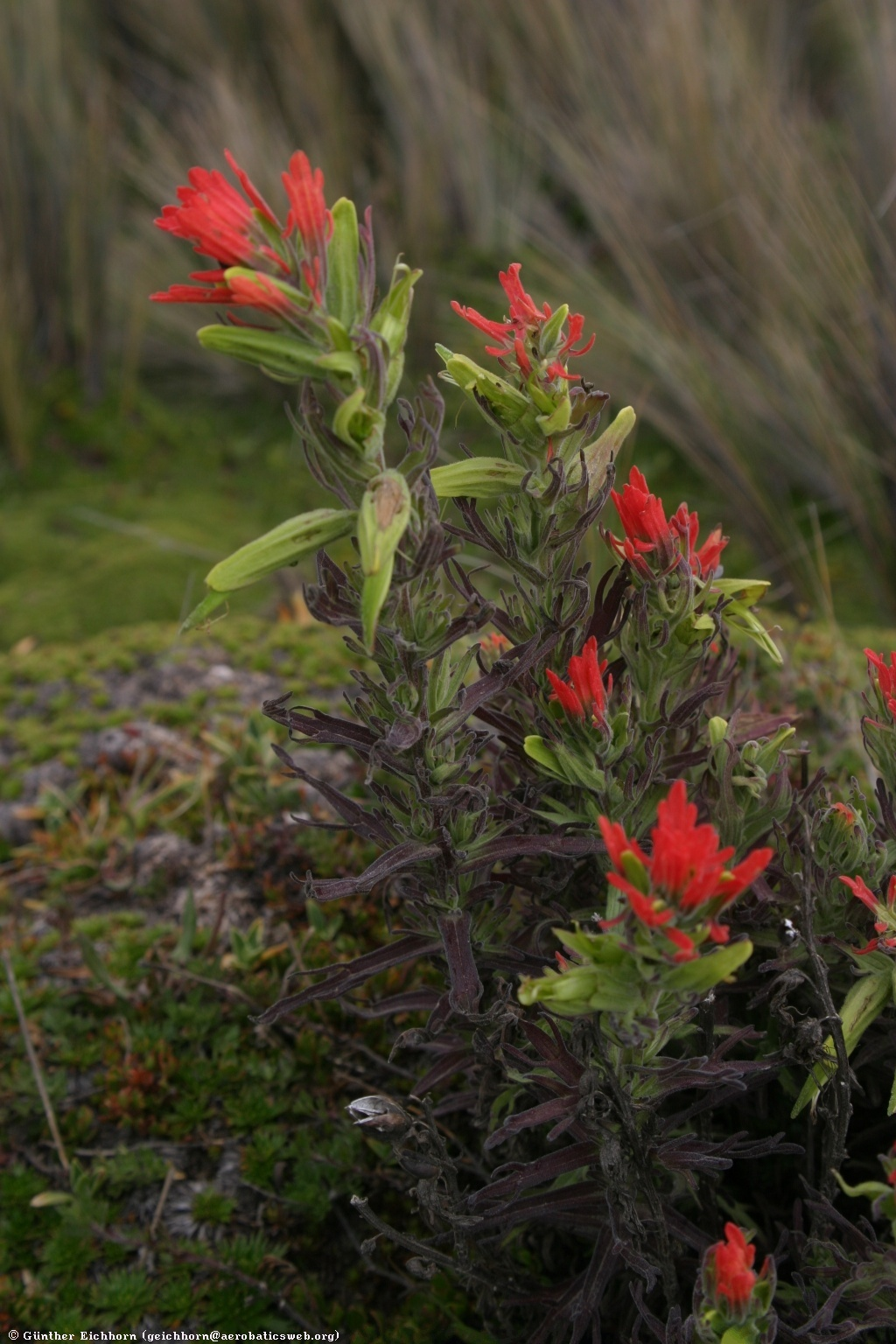
- Lancetilla del Páramo (Castilleja pumila) on Cotopaxi, Ecuador

Scientific classification
- Kingdom: Plantae
- Clade: Tracheophytes
- Clade: Angiosperms
- Clade: Eudicots
- Clade: Asterids
- Order: Lamiales
- Family: Orobanchaceae
- Genus: Castilleja
- Species: C. pumila

Binomial name
- Castilleja pumila (Benth.) Wedd.

= Castilleja pumila =

Species of flowering plant

Castilleja pumila, the lancetilla del páramo, is a flowering species of plant in the family Orobanchaceae.

== Distribution ==
Bolivia (South America), Chile (South America), Colombia (South America), Ecuador (South America), Peru (South America).
