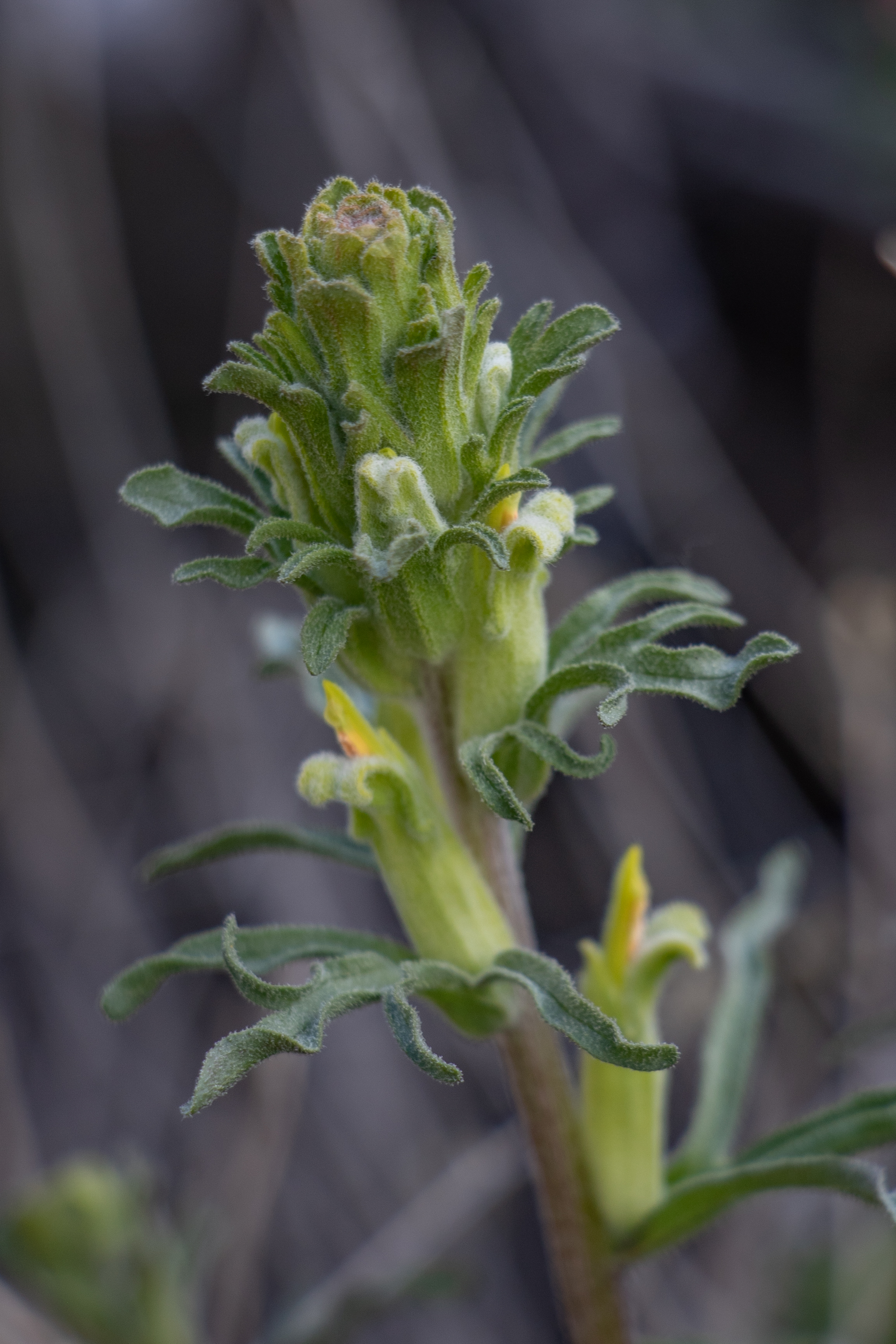

Scientific classification
- Kingdom: Plantae
- Clade: Embryophytes
- Clade: Tracheophytes
- Clade: Spermatophytes
- Clade: Angiosperms
- Clade: Eudicots
- Clade: Asterids
- Order: Lamiales
- Family: Orobanchaceae
- Genus: Castilleja
- Species: C. plagiotoma

Binomial name
- Castilleja plagiotoma A.Gray

= Castilleja plagiotoma =

Species of flowering plant

Castilleja plagiotoma, the Mojave Indian paintbrush, is a hemiparasitic perennial plant with green flowers that grows in deserts of California. It is in the Castilleja genus of the broomrape plant family. It is included in the CNPS Inventory of Rare and Endangered Plants.
