= C. nana =

C. nana may refer to:

- Caladenia nana, Endl. in J.G.C.Lehmann, 1846, the dwarf Caladenia, an orchid species in the genus Caladenia
- Cardiocondyla nana, an ant species in the genus Cardiocondyla
- Castilleja nana, the dwarf alpine Indian paintbrush, a plant species native to the western United States
- Cavia nana, a Guinea pig species in the genus Cavia
- Ceroxys nana, a picture-winged fly species
- Chaeteessa nana, a praying mantis species
- Chanda nana, the elongate glassy perchlet, a fish species
- Chusquea nana, a bamboo species in the genus Chusquea
- Clarkella nana, a plant species
- Cochylis nana, a moth species found in Europe, Amur Oblast and Nova Scotia
- Corallicola nana, a fungus species
- Crepis nana, the dwarf alpine hawksbeard, a flowering plant species native to much of northern North America and northern Asia
- Crocidura nana, the Somali dwarf shrew, a mammal species found in Ethiopia and Somalia
- Cryosophila nana, a flowering plant species found only in Mexico
- Cryphia nana, a moth species found in California
- Cyanolyca nana, the dwarf jay, a bird species endemic to Mexico
- Cylindromyia nana, a fly species in the genus Cylindromyia

== synonyms ==
- Calliphora nana, a synonym for Calliphora vicina, a fly species

== See also ==
- Nana (disambiguation)
