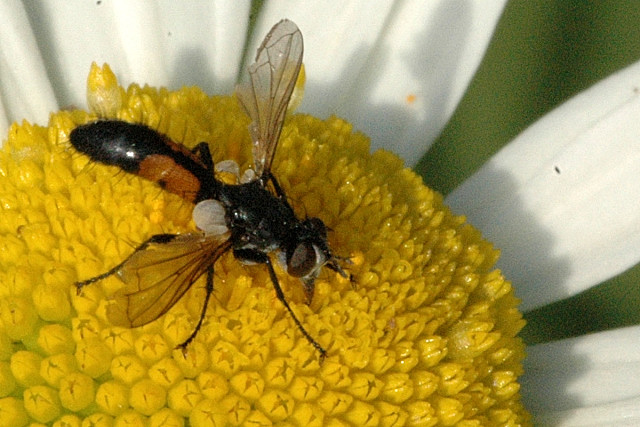

Scientific classification
- Kingdom: Animalia
- Phylum: Arthropoda
- Clade: Pancrustacea
- Class: Insecta
- Order: Diptera
- Family: Tachinidae
- Genus: Cylindromyia
- Subgenus: Neocyptera
- Species: C. auriceps

Binomial name
- Cylindromyia auriceps (Meigen, 1838)

Synonyms
- Ocyptera auriceps Meigen, 1838; Ocyptera coarctata Loew, 1844; Ocyptera mussinii Rondani, 1861; Ocyptera picciolii Rondani, 1861

= Cylindromyia auriceps =

Species of fly

Cylindromyia auriceps is a European species of fly in the family Tachinidae. Larvae are parasitoids of Aelia acuminata.

== Distribution ==
British Isles, Czech Republic, Hungary, Lithuania, Moldova, Poland, Romania, Slovakia, Ukraine, Denmark, Sweden, Andorra, Bulgaria, Corsica, Croatia, Cyprus, Greece, Italy, Malta, Portugal, Serbia, Spain, Turkey, Austria, Belgium, Channel Islands, France, Germany, Switzerland, Iran, Israel, Algeria, Russia, Transcaucasia.
