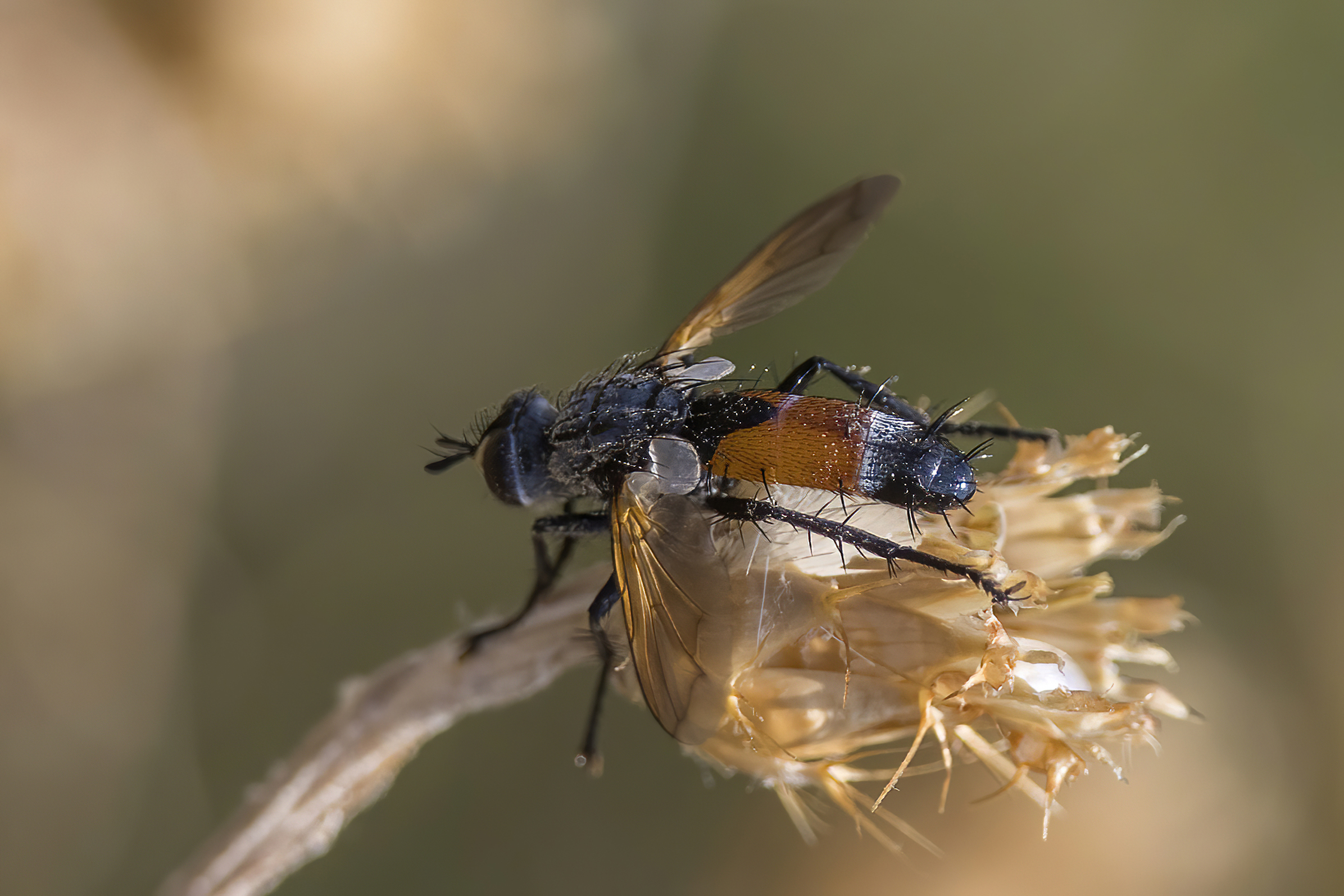
- Female, Romania

Scientific classification
- Kingdom: Animalia
- Phylum: Arthropoda
- Clade: Pancrustacea
- Class: Insecta
- Order: Diptera
- Family: Tachinidae
- Genus: Cylindromyia
- Subgenus: Cylindromyia
- Species: C. brassicaria

Binomial name
- Cylindromyia brassicaria (Fabricius, 1775)

Synonyms
- Musca brassicaria Fabricius, 1775; Musca cylindrica De Geer, 1776; Parthenia boscii Robineau-Desvoidy, 1830; Ocyptera trinacrina Bigot, 1878; Phania sapporensis Matsumura, 1916

= Cylindromyia brassicaria =

Species of fly

Cylindromyia brassicaria is a species of fly in the family Tachinidae.

== Distribution and habitat ==
This species occurs in the Palearctic realm, in Central Asia (Turkmenistan), China (Central East, Nei Mongol, Northeast, Qinghai & Xizang, Xinjiang) and in large parts of Europe. In addition to Western. Europe (Austria, Belgium, Channel Islands, France, Germany) and Central Europe (Belarus, Czech Republic, Estonia, Hungary, Latvia, Moldova, Poland, Romania, Slovakia, Ukraine), the distribution area includes the British Isles, Scandinavia (Denmark, Finland, Norway, Sweden) and Southern Europe (Albania, Andorra, Bulgaria, Corse, Croatia, Greece, Italy, North Macedonia, Portugal, Serbia, Slovenia, Spain, Turkey). The typical habitat of Cylindromyia brassicaria are meadows and hedges rows.

== Description ==
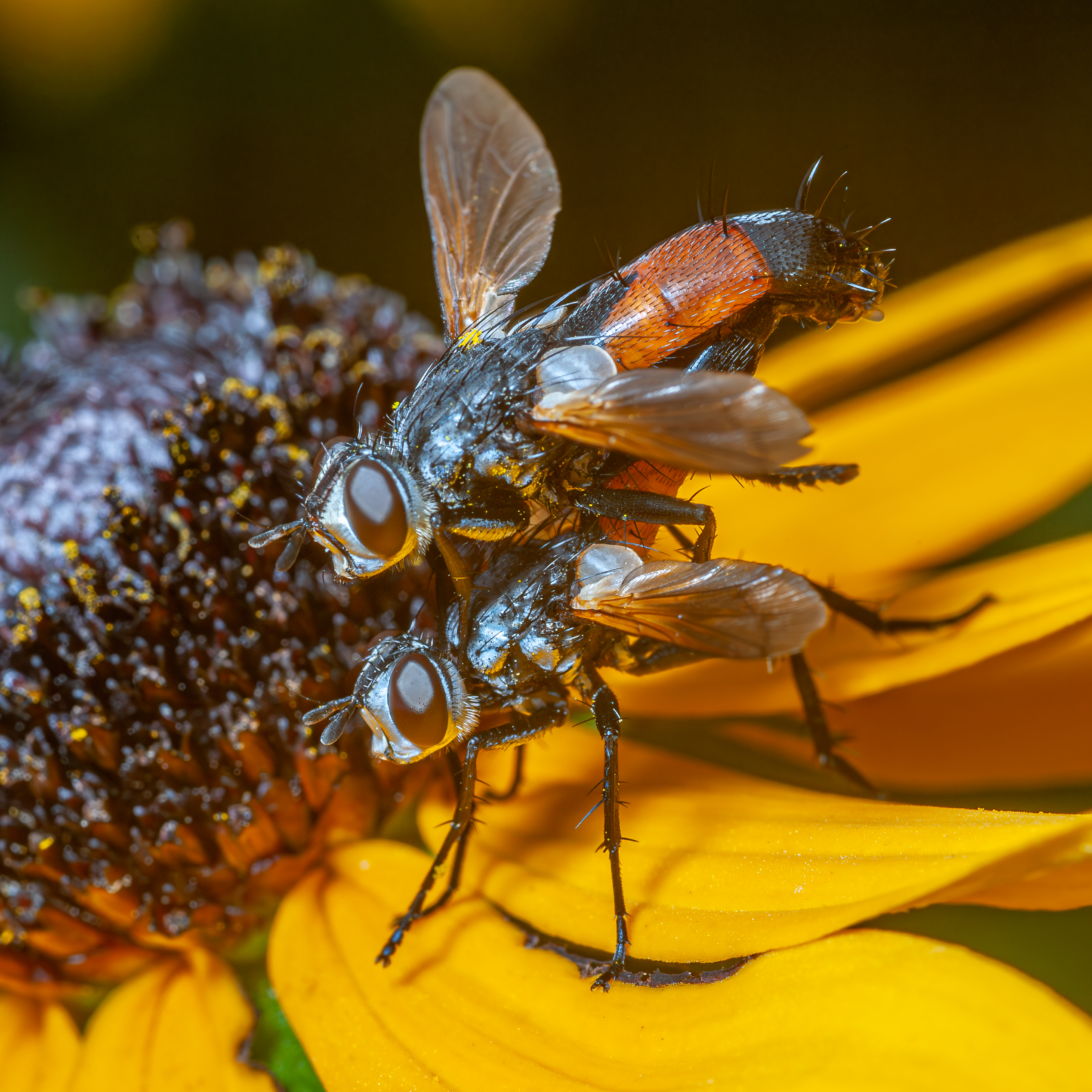
Copula

Cylindromyia brassicaria reaches a body length of about 9–13 mm (0.35–0.51 in).

The middle section of the abdomen of the otherwise grey-black flies is reddish-orange. A black wedge protrudes into the reddish-orange-colored area. These flies have black bristles. The transparent wings are colored orange on the inner leading edge. Below the wings are white lobes. In the female, the red-brown eyes are separated by a white area with a black center line.

Tergites 4 and 5 are black, sometimes also a black longitudinal stripe is present on tergite 3. Abdomen is without discal bristles. Tergite 2 ventrally only with hairs, often almost bare. Back of the head with white hairs only. In the males the hind legs and the ventral side of tergite 3 show normal, short hairs. In the females tergite 4 has only 4 marginal bristles.

== Biology ==
The adults fly from June to August. They lay their eggs on various bugs as larvae are endoparasitoids. Larvae will develop within the appropriate host. They mainly feed on the Hairy Shieldbug (Dolycoris baccarum), the Vernal Shieldbug Peribalus strictus, the Green Shieldbug (Palomena prasina), the Wheat stinkbug Aelia rostrata, the corn bug Eurygaster integriceps and the striped bug (Graphosoma lineatum. Adults mainly feed on nectar and pollen of Heracleum sphondylium, Valeriana officinalis, Cirsium arvense and Bistorta officinalis.

== Bibliography ==
- Belshaw, Robert (1993). "Tachinid Flies Diptera Tachinidae". Royal Entomological Society Handbooks. Royal Entomological Society of London. 10 (4ai): 170.
- Chandler, Peter J. (1998). Checklists of Insects of the British Isles (New Series) Part 1: Diptera. Handbooks for the Identification of British Insects. New Series. Vol. 12. London: Royal Entomological Society of London. pp. 1–234. ISBN 0-901546-82-8.
- Falk, S.J. (2009). "Cylindromyia brassicaria (Meigen, 1824) (Diptera, Tachinidae) new to Britain". Dipterists Digest. 2nd. Dipterists Forum. 16 (2): 89–90.
- Gilasian E., Talebi A. A., Ziegler J., Manzari S. and Parchami Araghi M. A review of the genus Cylindromyia Meigen (Diptera: Tachinidae) in Iran, with the description of two new species and the newly discovered male of C. persica Tschorsing (англ.) // Studia dipterologica. — 2013. — Vol. 20, no. 2. — P. 299–324. — ISSN 0945-3954.
- Pape T. & Thompson F.C. (eds). (2019). Systema Dipterorum (version 2.0, Jan 2011). In: Species 2000 & ITIS Catalogue of Life, 2019 Annual Checklist (Roskov Y., Ower G., Orrell T., Nicolson D., Bailly N., Kirk P.M., Bourgoin T., DeWalt R.E., Decock W., Nieukerken E. van, Zarucchi J., Penev L., eds.). Digital resource at www.catalogueoflife.org/annual-checklist/2019. Species 2000: Naturalis, Leiden, the Netherlands. ISSN 2405-884X.
- van Emden, F.I. (1954). "Ditera Cyclorrhapha Calyptrata (I) Section (a) Tachinidae & Calliphoridae". Royal Entomological Society Handbooks. Royal Entomological Society of London. 10 (4a): 133.
