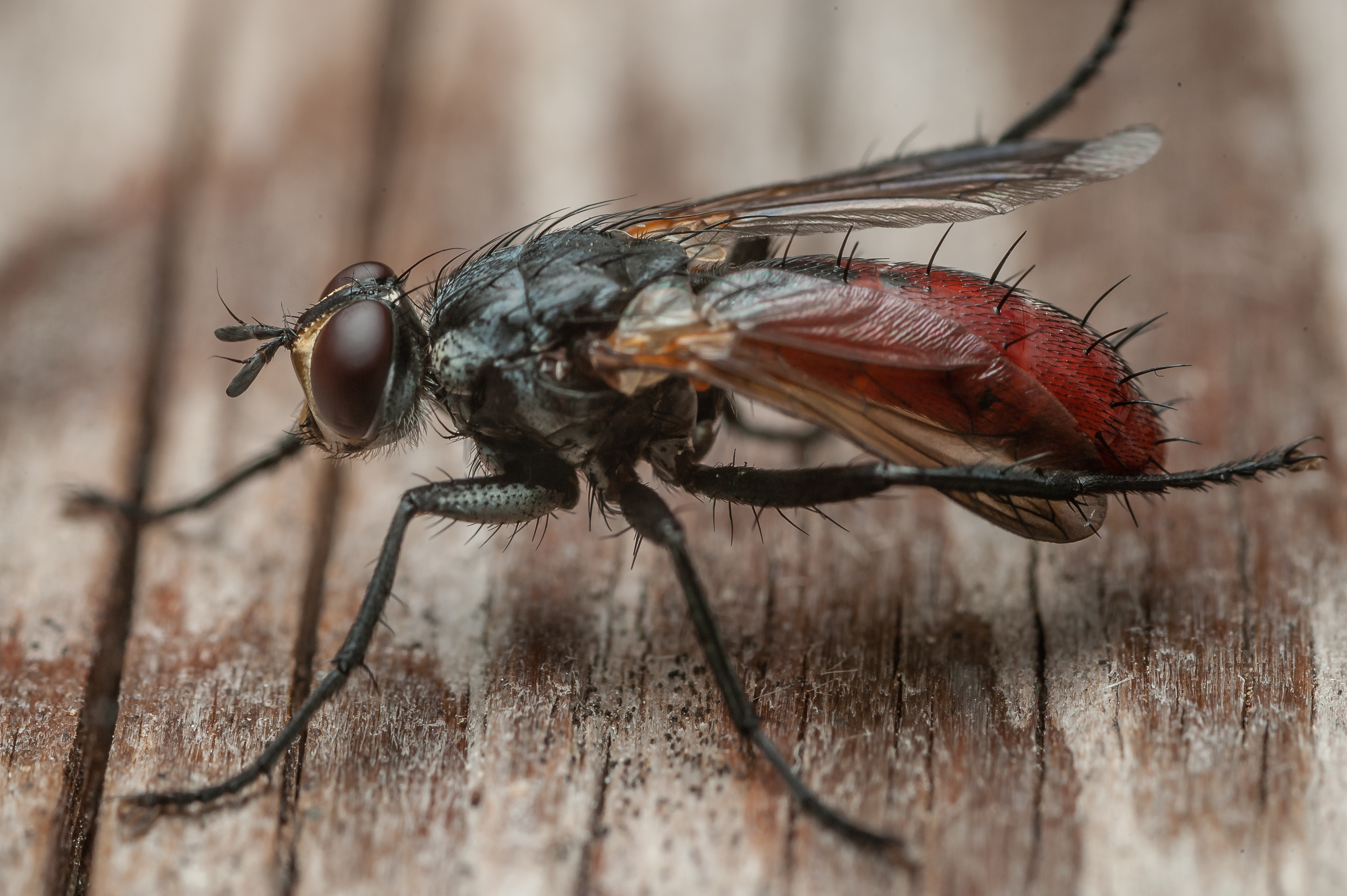
- Cylindromyia bicolor, lateral view

Scientific classification
- Kingdom: Animalia
- Phylum: Arthropoda
- Clade: Pancrustacea
- Class: Insecta
- Order: Diptera
- Family: Tachinidae
- Genus: Cylindromyia
- Subgenus: Cylindromyia
- Species: C. bicolor

Binomial name
- Cylindromyia bicolor (Olivier, 1812)

Synonyms
- Ocyptera coccinea Meigen, 1824; Ocyptera pentatomae Robineau-Desvoidy, 1830; Ocyptera bicolor Olivier, 1812

= Cylindromyia bicolor =

Species of fly

Cylindromyia bicolor is a European species of fly in the family Tachinidae.

== Distribution ==
Czech Republic, Hungary, Moldova, Romania, Slovakia, Ukraine, Bosnia and Herzegovina, Bulgaria, Corsica, Croatia, Greece, Italy, Macedonia, Portugal, Serbia, Slovenia, Spain, Turkey, Austria, Belgium, France, Germany, Netherlands, Switzerland, Kazakhstan, Iran, Russia, Transcaucasia.

== Habitat ==
These insects mainly inhabit dry meadows, bushes, edges of wood, marshes, parks and gardens.

== Description ==
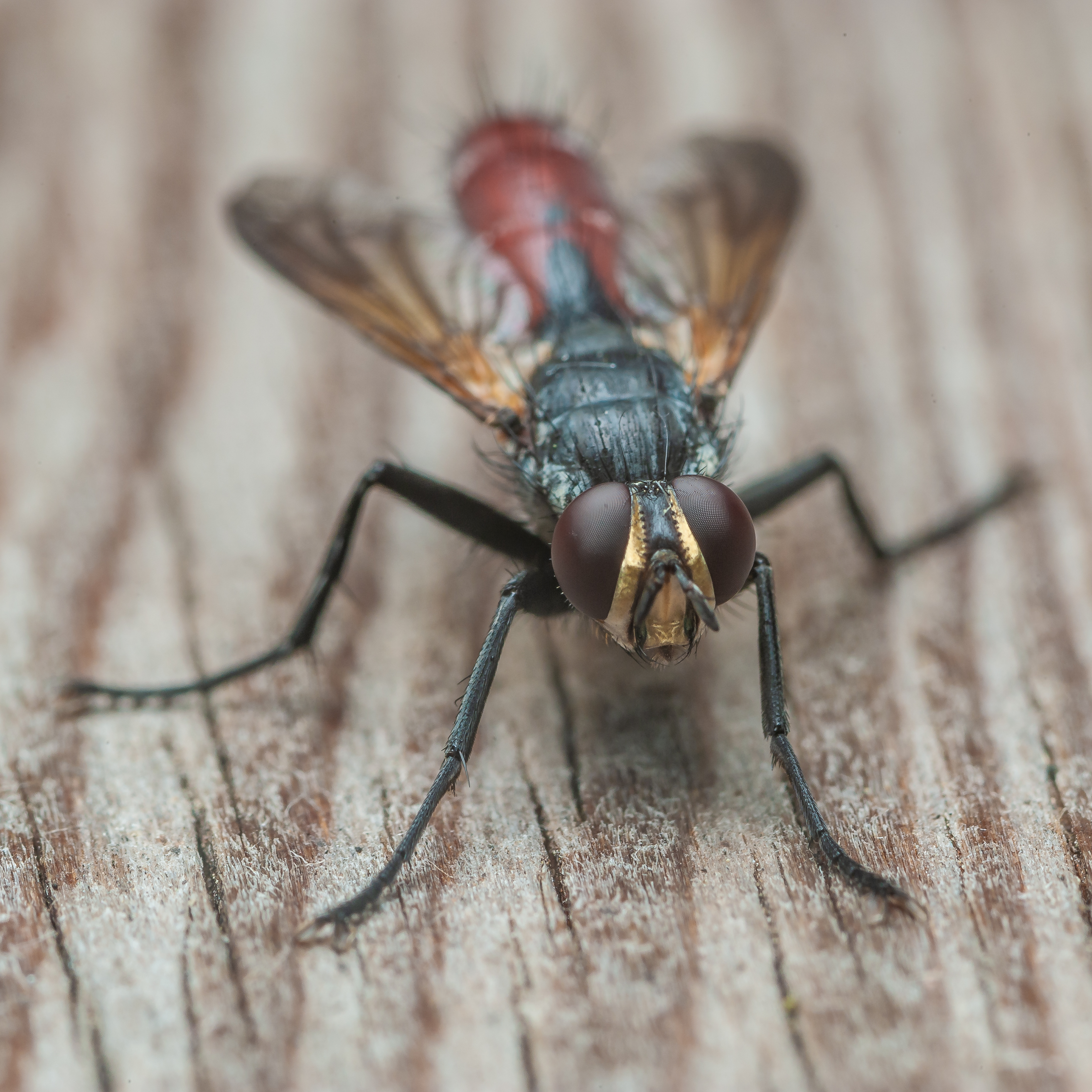
Frontal view

Cylindromyia bicolor can reach a length of 11–14 millimetres (0.43–0.55 in). These small flies have a grayish thorax and very elongated, cylindrical red abdomen, with a black longitudinal band at the base and discal bristles at the tergites 2–4. The large compound eyes are dark brown. Wings are partly smoked. Calyptra are large and white. Legs are black.

== Biology ==
Adults can be found from mid July to October, with a peak in August. They feed on nectar and pollen of flowers of various local plants, but especially on Apiaceae. Larvae of this species are endoparasites of Rhaphigaster nebulosa (Pentatomidae). The females lay their eggs on their hosts, usually one egg per bug. Then the larvae enter by the abdomen of juvenile pentatomids, where they develop. They pupate on the ground after winter.
