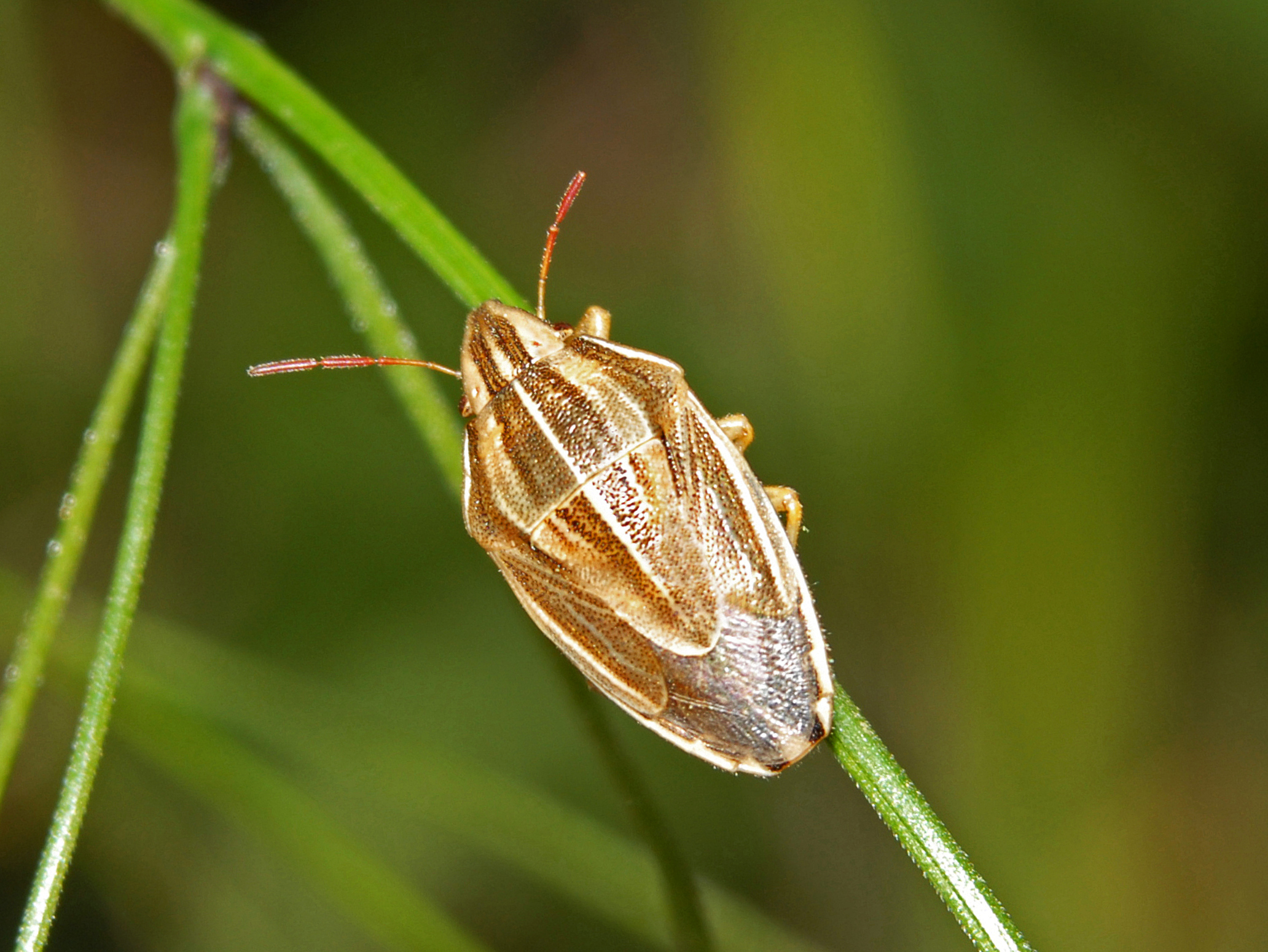
- Aelia acuminata

Scientific classification
- Kingdom: Animalia
- Phylum: Arthropoda
- Clade: Pancrustacea
- Class: Insecta
- Order: Hemiptera
- Suborder: Heteroptera
- Family: Pentatomidae
- Subfamily: Pentatominae
- Tribe: Aelini
- Genus: Aelia; Fabricius, 1803

= Aelia (bug) =

Genus of true bugs

Aelia is a genus of Palaearctic and Nearctic shield bugs belonging to the subfamily Pentatominae and typical of the tribe Aelini.

== Species ==
These 15 species belong to the genus Aelia:

- Aelia acuminata (Linnaeus, 1758)^{i c g}
- Aelia albovittata Fieber, 1868^{g}
- Aelia alticola Kiritshenko, 1914^{g}
- Aelia americana Dallas, 1851^{i c g b}
- Aelia angusta Stehlik, 1976^{g}
- Aelia cognata Fieber, 1868
- Aelia cribrosa Fieber, 1868^{g}
- Aelia furcula Fieber, 1868^{g}
- Aelia germari Küster, 1852^{g}
- Aelia klugii Hahn, 1833^{g}
- Aelia melanota Fieber, 1868^{g}
- Aelia notata Rey, 1887^{g}
- Aelia rostrata Boheman, 1852^{g}
- Aelia sibirica Reuter, 1884^{g}
- Aelia virgata (Herrich-Schaeffer, 1841)^{g}

Data sources: i = ITIS, c = Catalogue of Life, g = GBIF, b = Bugguide.net
