= Cylindromyia propusilla =

Scientific classification
- Kingdom: Animalia
- Phylum: Arthropoda
- Clade: Pancrustacea
- Class: Insecta
- Order: Diptera
- Family: Tachinidae
- Genus: Cylindromyia
- Subgenus: Cylindromyia
- Species: C. propusilla

Binomial name
- Cylindromyia propusilla Sabrosky & Arnaud, 1965

Synonyms
- Cylindromyia nigra Aldrich, 1926; Cylindromyia pusilla Aldrich, 1927

Species of fly

Cylindromyia propusilla is a species of bristle fly in the family Tachinidae.

== Distribution ==
Canada, United States, Cuba, Mexico.
