= Apinocyptera =

Scientific classification
- Kingdom: Animalia
- Phylum: Arthropoda
- Clade: Pancrustacea
- Class: Insecta
- Order: Diptera
- Family: Tachinidae
- Genus: Cylindromyia
- Subgenus: Apinocyptera; Townsend, 1915

Type species
- Apinocyptera signata Townsend, 1915

Synonyms
- Odontocyptera Townsend, 1915

Subgenus of flies

Apinocyptera is a subgenus of flies in the family Tachinidae.

== Species ==
- Cylindromyia nana (Townsend, 1915)
- Cylindromyia platensis Guimarães, 1976
- Cylindromyia signatipennis (Wulp, 1892)
- Cylindromyia thompsoni Guimarães, 1976
