= Ichneumonops =

Scientific classification
- Kingdom: Animalia
- Phylum: Arthropoda
- Clade: Pancrustacea
- Class: Insecta
- Order: Diptera
- Family: Tachinidae
- Genus: Cylindromyia
- Subgenus: Ichneumonops; Townsend, 1908

Type species
- Cylindromyia mirabilis Townsend, 1908

Subgenus of flies

Ichneumonops is a subgenus of flies in the family Tachinidae.

== Species ==
- Cylindromyia mirabilis (Townsend, 1908)
