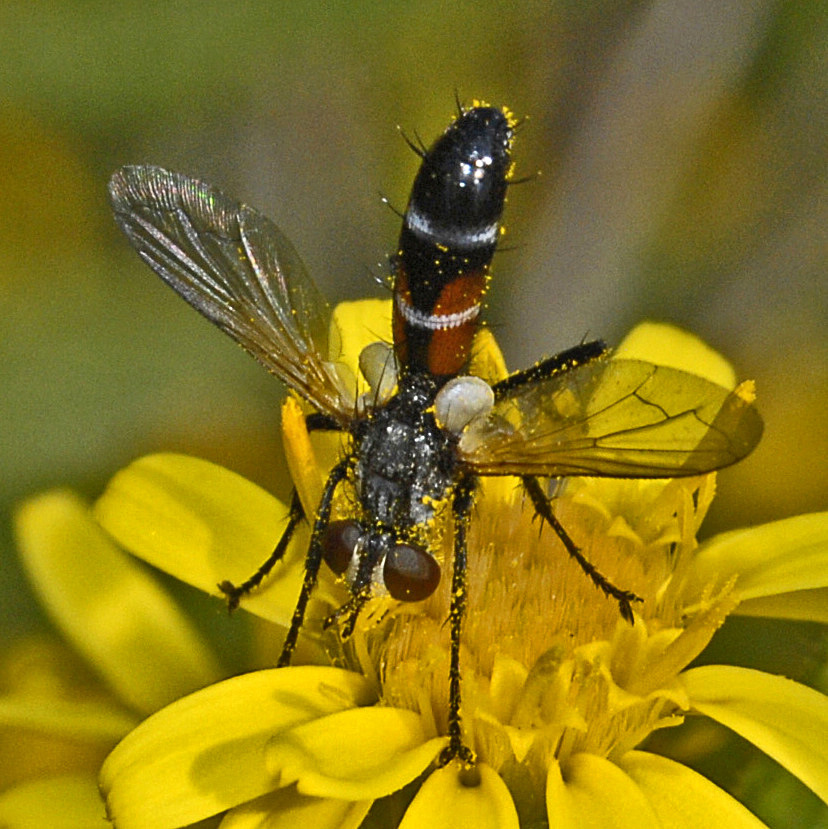

Scientific classification
- Kingdom: Animalia
- Phylum: Arthropoda
- Clade: Pancrustacea
- Class: Insecta
- Order: Diptera
- Family: Tachinidae
- Genus: Cylindromyia
- Subgenus: Neocyptera
- Species: C. interrupta

Binomial name
- Cylindromyia interrupta (Meigen, 1824)

Synonyms
- Ocyptera interrupta Meigen, 1824; Ocyptera dosiades Walker, 1849; Ocyptera setulosa Loew, 1844

= Cylindromyia interrupta =

Species of fly

Cylindromyia interrupta is a species of fly in the family Tachinidae.

== Distribution and habitat ==
This species is present in most of Europe, Russia and in North America ( Alaska to California, North Dakota, Colorado and New Jersey). These tachinid flies live in hedge rows and dry meadows.

== Description ==
Cylindromyia interrupta can reach a length of 6–8 millimetres (0.24–0.31 in) and a wingspan of 12 millimetres (0.47 in). Body is slender. Thorax is black, while the abdomen is reddish with two silver rings, a wide longitudinal black marking and black apical tergites. Hind tibiae have 1 or 2 posteroventral bristles. Apical scutellars are absent. The abdomen has median discal bristles on tergites 1, 2, 3 and 4. The bright white calypters stand out.

== Biology ==
Adults can be found from May to August. They mainly feed on nectar and pollen of Apiaceae (especially Leucanthemum vulgare). This tachinid fly parasitizes moths and true bugs (Hemiptera). The larvae develop inside the living host.
