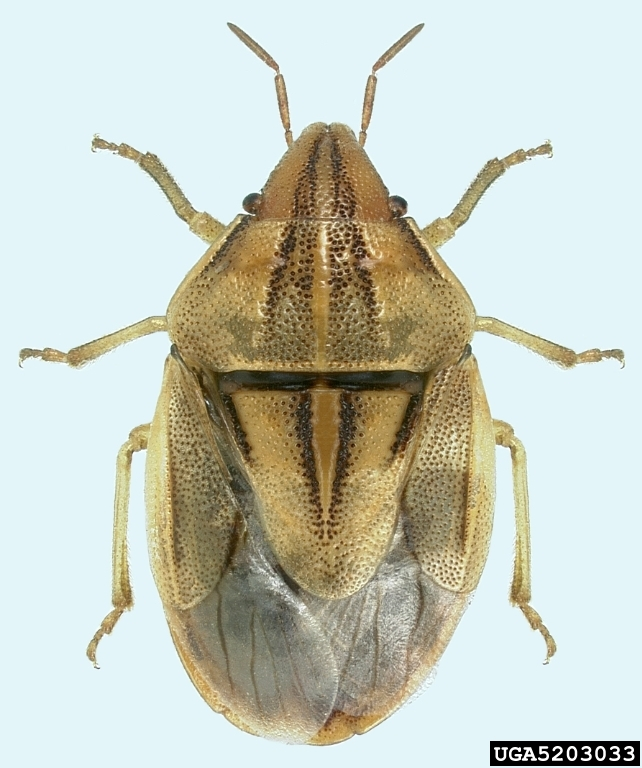

Scientific classification
- Kingdom: Animalia
- Phylum: Arthropoda
- Clade: Pancrustacea
- Class: Insecta
- Order: Hemiptera
- Suborder: Heteroptera
- Family: Pentatomidae
- Tribe: Aelini
- Genus: Aelia
- Species: A. americana

Binomial name
- Aelia americana Dallas, 1851

= Aelia americana =

Species of true bug

Aelia americana is a species of stink bug in the family Pentatomidae. It is found in North America.
