= Exogaster =

Scientific classification
- Kingdom: Animalia
- Phylum: Arthropoda
- Clade: Pancrustacea
- Class: Insecta
- Order: Diptera
- Family: Tachinidae
- Genus: Cylindromyia
- Subgenus: Exogaster; Rondani, 1856

Type species
- Exogaster carinata Rondani, 1856

Subgenus of flies

Exogaster is a subgenus of flies in the family Tachinidae.

== Species ==
- Cylindromyia persica Tschorsnig, 2000
- Cylindromyia rufifrons (Loew, 1844)
