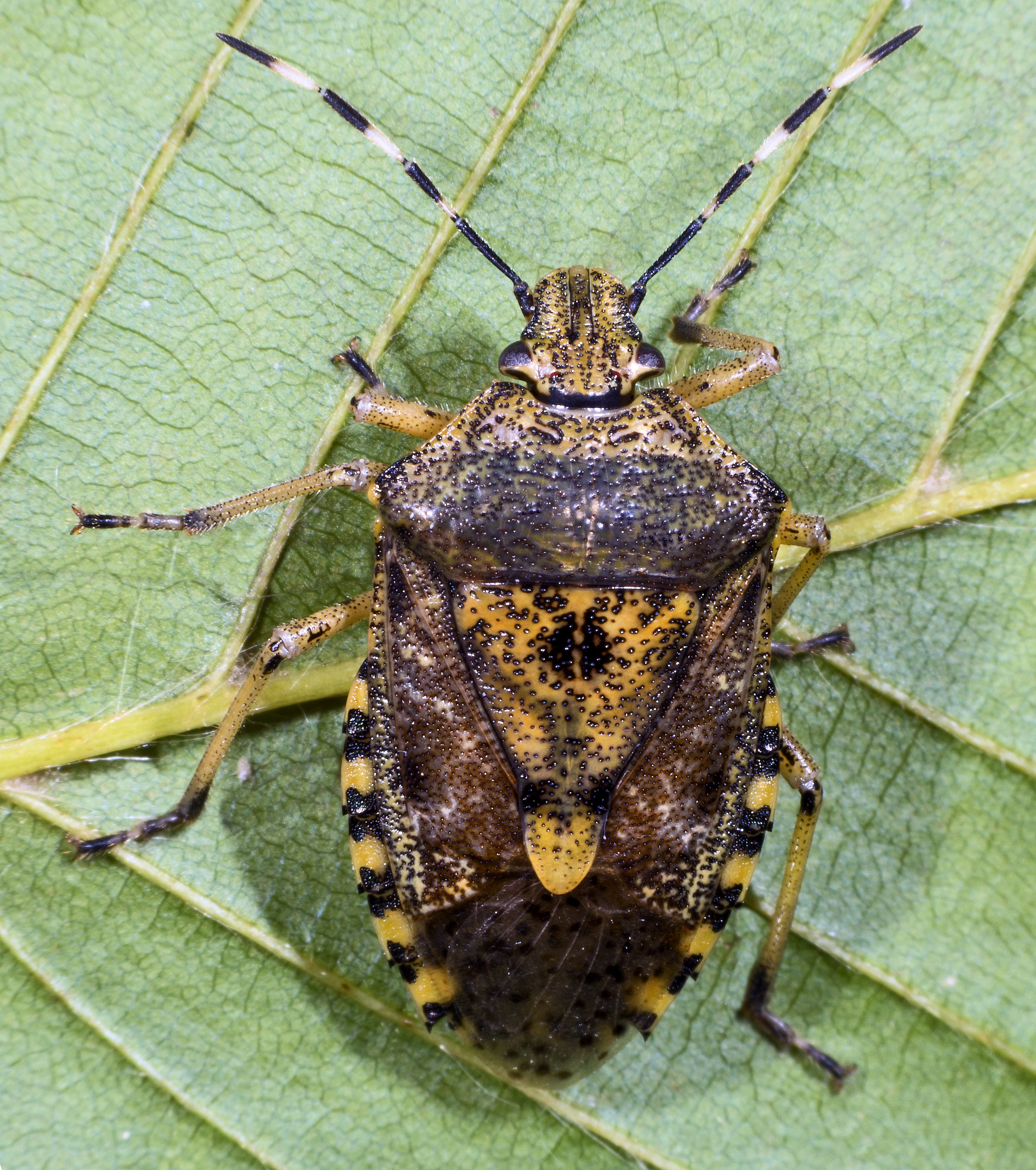
- Adult of Rhaphigaster nebulosa in France

Scientific classification
- Kingdom: Animalia
- Phylum: Arthropoda
- Clade: Pancrustacea
- Class: Insecta
- Order: Hemiptera
- Suborder: Heteroptera
- Family: Pentatomidae
- Genus: Rhaphigaster
- Species: R. nebulosa

Binomial name
- Rhaphigaster nebulosa (Poda, 1761)

= Rhaphigaster nebulosa =

Species of true bug

Rhaphigaster nebulosa, common name mottled shieldbug, is a species of stink bug that belongs to the family Pentatomidae. It is native to Europe.

== Distribution ==
This species is distributed throughout the Palearctic region, more commonly in the southern than in the northern parts of Central Europe (Austria, Croatia, France, Germany, Greece, Hungary, Italy, Luxembourg, Serbia, Slovenia, Spain, Switzerland, Turkey, United Kingdom), and is not known to occur in the United States.

== Habitat ==
Mottled shieldbugs prefer warm deciduous forests, parks and gardens.

== Description ==
Rhaphigaster nebulosa can reach a length of 14–16 millimetres (0.55–0.63 in). These large shieldbugs are hairless and coloured dirty yellowish-grey to brown with irregularly-distributed fovea on the top side of its body. The membrane of the forewings is often speckled dark brown, although these speckles are quite variable in extent. The lateral edge (connexivum) of the abdomen has black and yellow markings. The antennae are ringed with black and yellow markings on the 3rd to 5th segments. The underside of the body is light coloured and shows dark spots. On its underside, between the hips (on the 1st sternite), there is a long spur or spine. This species is similar to Dolycoris baccarum, but it lacks hairs.

Other species of Rhaphigaster can be confused with this species. In R. nebulosa, the spur on the underside is long enough to reach at least the anterior margin of the procoxae (shorter in R. brevispina). The femurs, mainly the hind femurs, have an isolated black spot on the anteroventral side of the apical half (absent in R. haraldi). The last tarsomere of each leg is largely blackish, and sometimes the first and second tarsomeres have brown or black apices (in R. haraldi all tarsomeres are pale).

== Biology ==
Mottled shieldbugs are polyphagous, feeding on sap from a range of broadleaved woody plants such as birch and hazel (Betulaceae); Arbutus (Ericaceae); beech and oak (Fagaceae); plane tree (Platanaceae); hawthorn, apple, plum and whitebeam (Rosaceae); Johnson grass (Poaceae); poplar and willow (Salicaceae); and Ulmus minor (Ulmaceae). They are also known to feed on freshly dead insects such as leaf beetle larvae.

In late spring, the female sticks around 40 eggs in lines or discs on different parts of plants. The young that hatch vary in colour and are flightless. Wing stumps are only recognisable after the third nymph stage. To protect against predators, young bugs have stink glands on their back; in the case of adults, these are to be found on the underside of the thorax. If threatened, a strong-smelling secretion is released. Adults can be found all year. They are not good fliers; their sluggish flight makes loud humming noises.

This species displays diurnal, thermophilic activity. As with most Pentatomidae, it produces only one generation per year. It likes to overwinter on walls covered with ivy. In its search for suitable winter quarters (splits and cracks) it often unwittingly finds its way into houses.

This species produces a plethora of eggs when disturbed in its habitat. Angering or threatening the bug makes it produce an off-white colored secretion that can be harmful if swallowed. Chemicals in the secretion allow the eggs to continue to fertilize in any environment, even those that are highly acidic or basic.

Eggs of R. nebulosa, like those of some other stink bugs, are parasitised by the samurai wasp Trissolcus japonicus (Scelionidae).

== Gallery ==
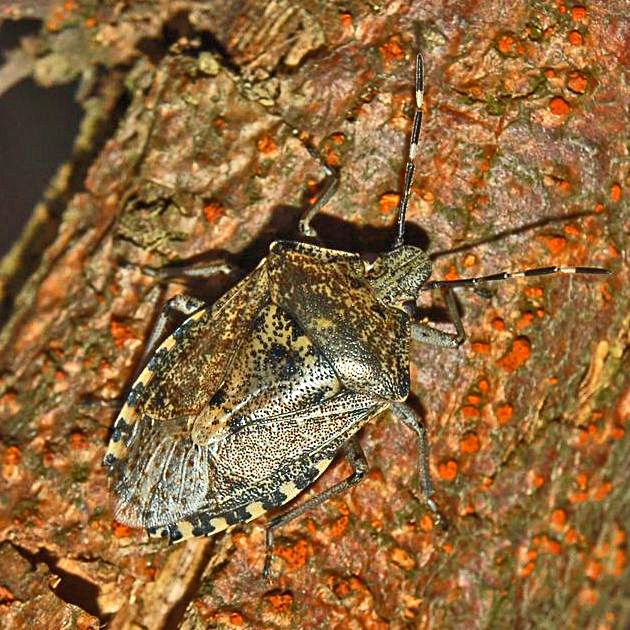
Dorsal view

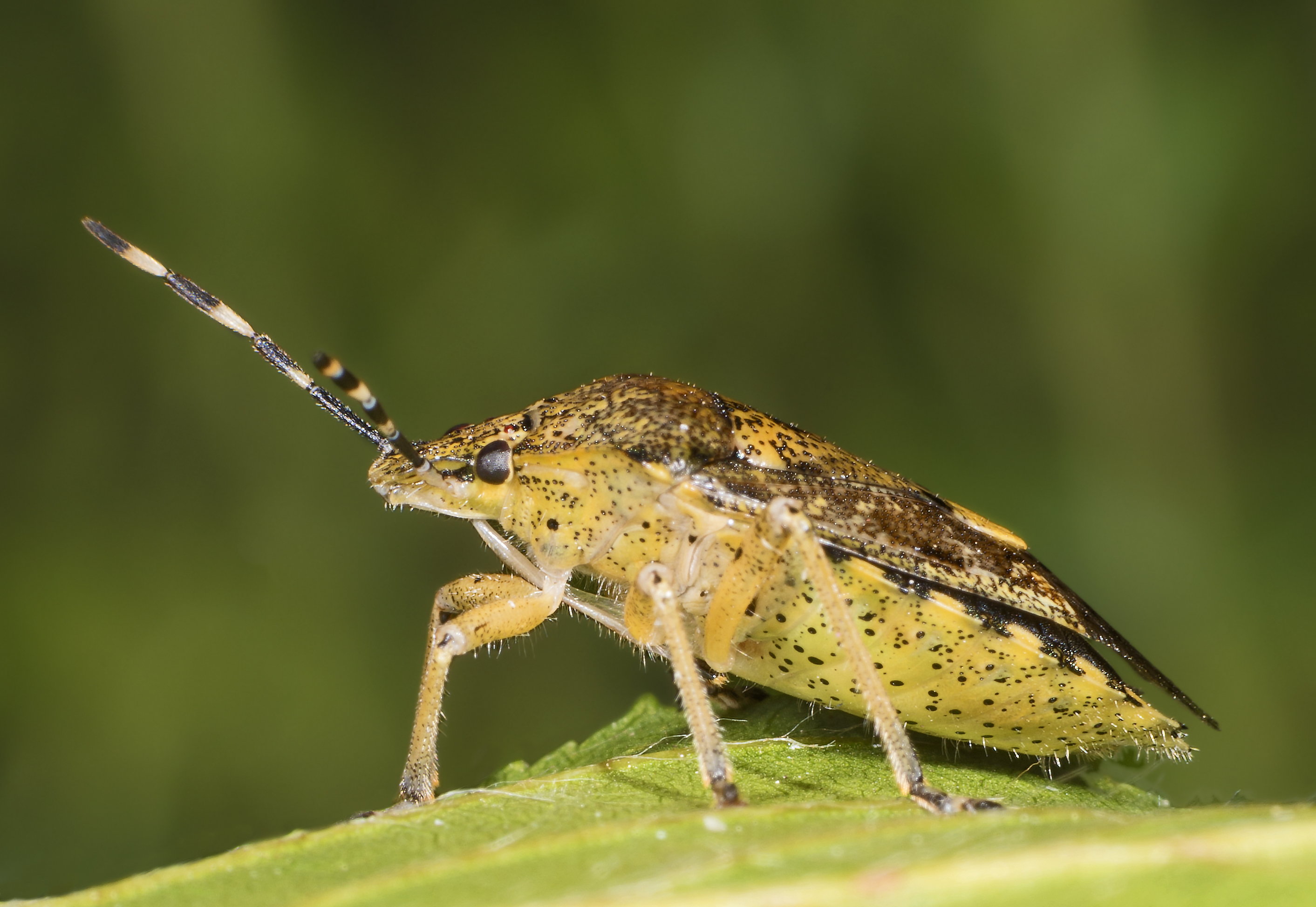
Side view

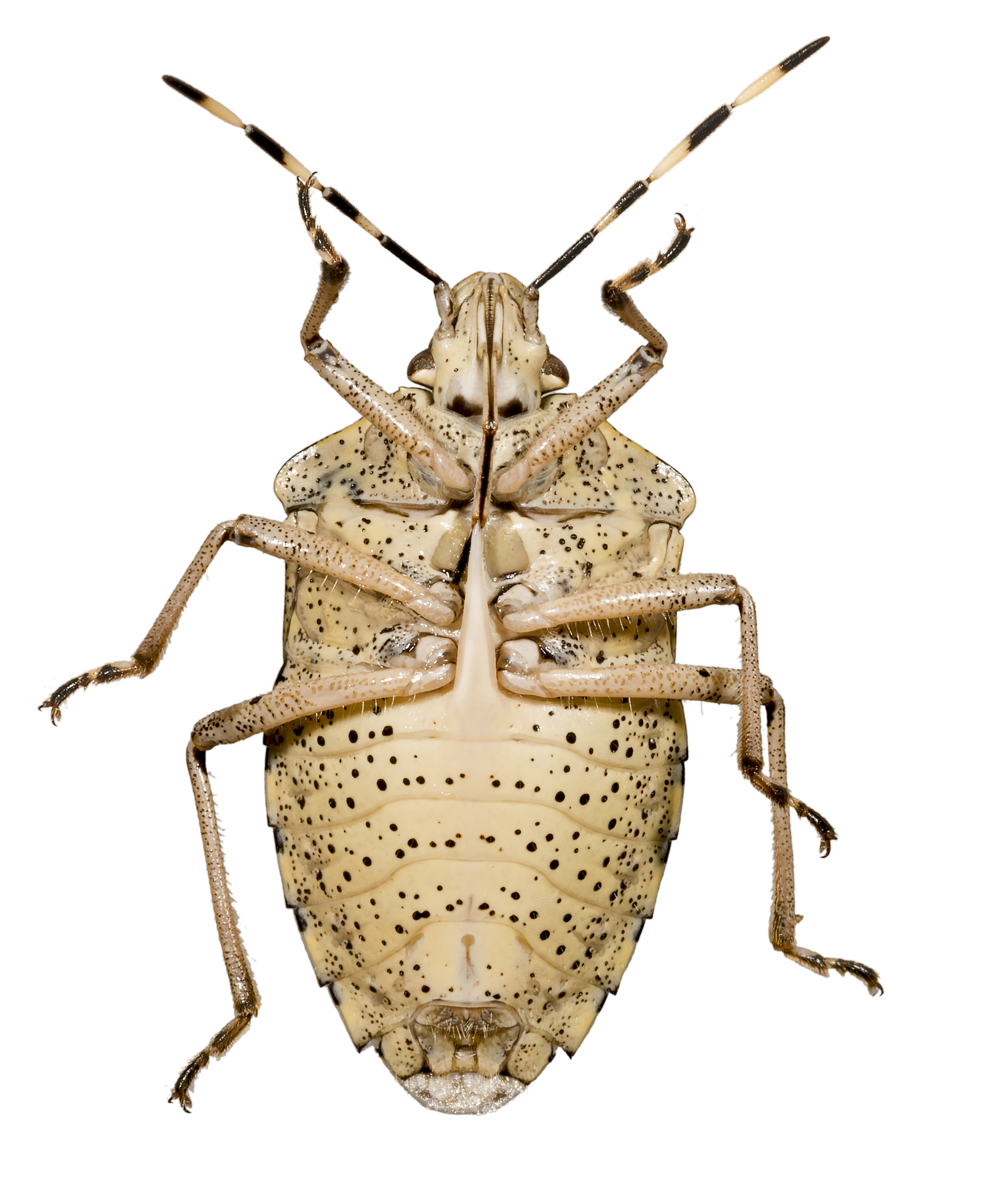
Ventral side

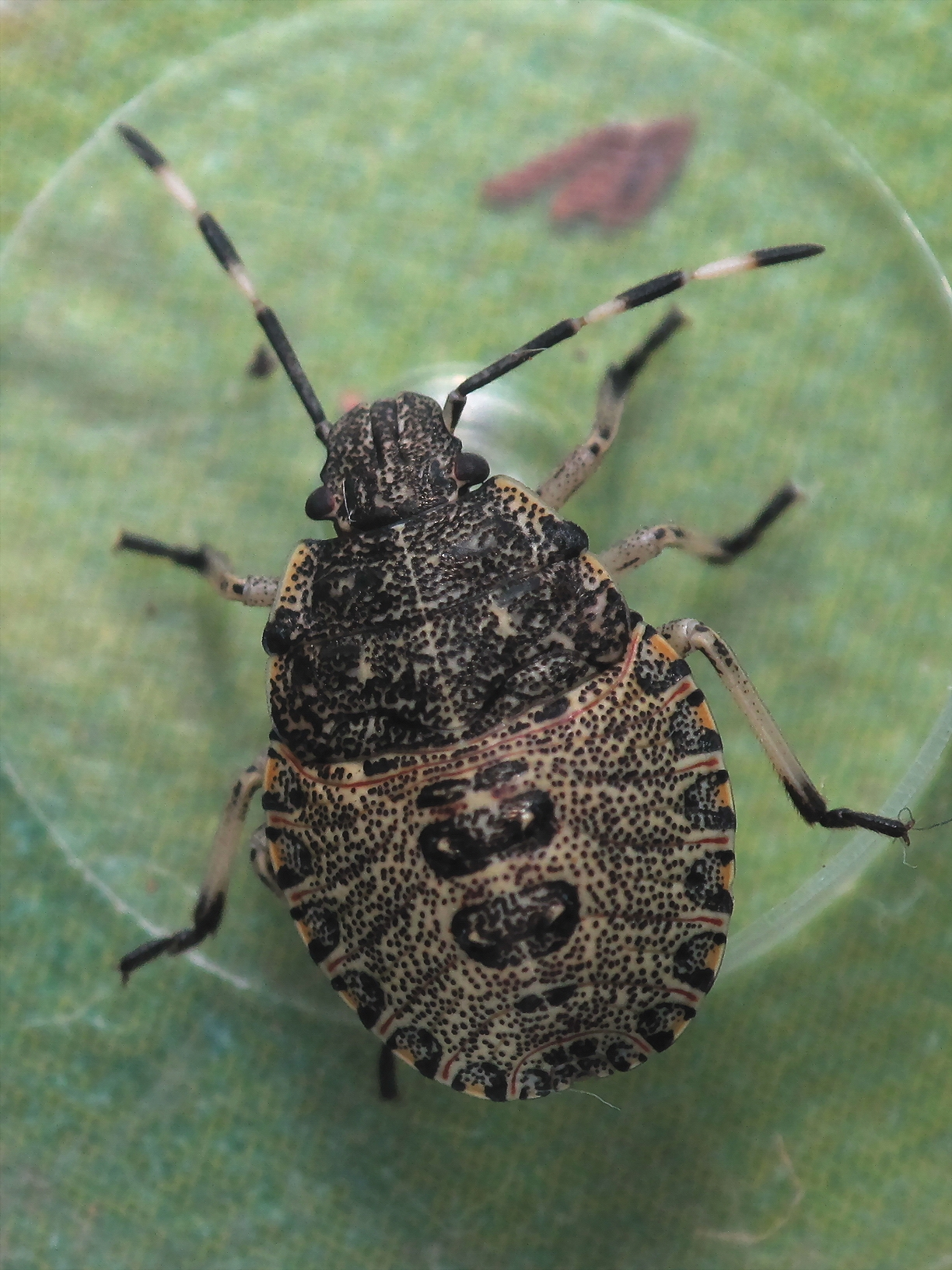
Early instar nymph

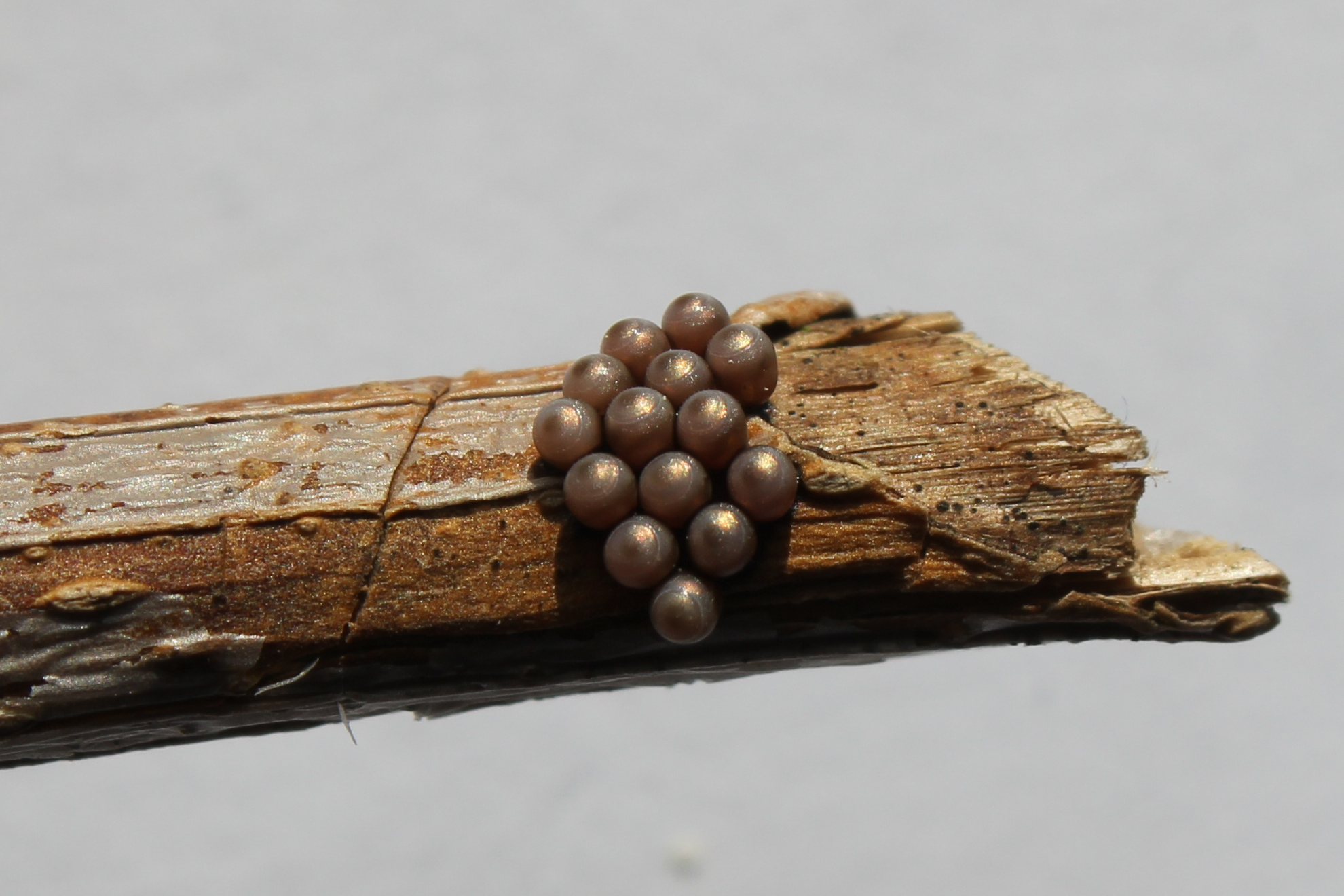
Eggs
