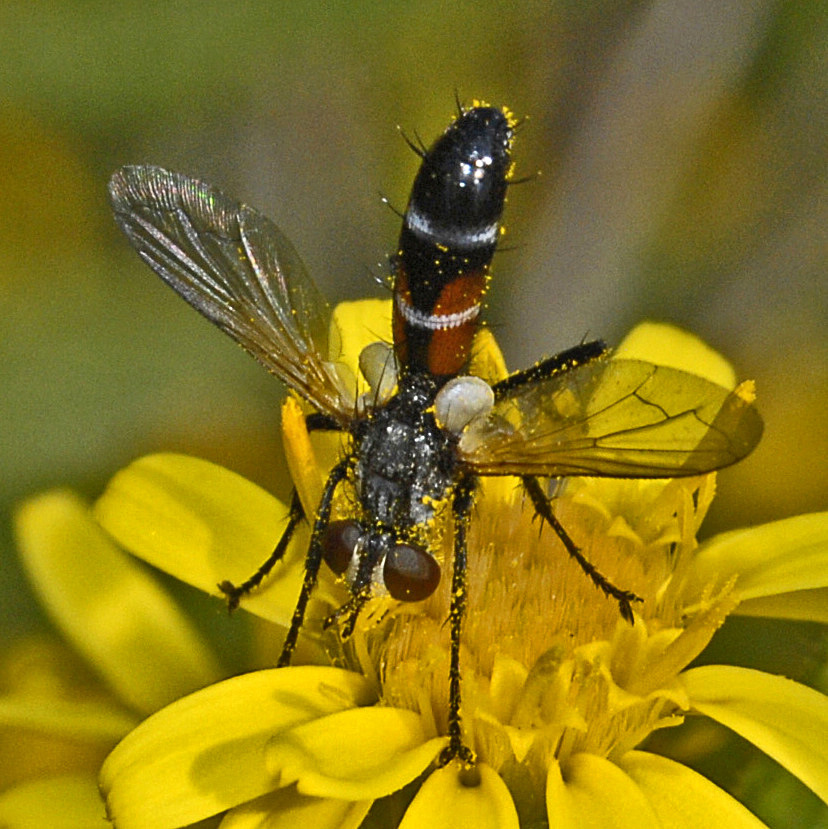
- Cylindromyia interrupta

Scientific classification
- Kingdom: Animalia
- Phylum: Arthropoda
- Clade: Pancrustacea
- Class: Insecta
- Order: Diptera
- Family: Tachinidae
- Genus: Cylindromyia
- Subgenus: Neocyptera; Townsend, 1916

Type species
- Ocyptera dosiades Walker, 1849

Synonyms
- Aubaeina Enderlein, 1937

= Neocyptera =

Subgenus of flies

Neocyptera is a subgenus of flies in the family Tachinidae.

== Species ==
- Cylindromyia arator Reinhard, 1956
- Cylindromyia auriceps (Meigen, 1838)
- Cylindromyia compressa Aldrich, 1926
- Cylindromyia hermonensis Kugler, 1974
- Cylindromyia interrupta (Meigen, 1824)
- Cylindromyia scapularis (Loew, 1845)
