= Eucylindromyia =

Scientific classification
- Kingdom: Animalia
- Phylum: Arthropoda
- Clade: Pancrustacea
- Class: Insecta
- Order: Diptera
- Family: Tachinidae
- Genus: Cylindromyia
- Subgenus: Eucylindromyia; Herting, 1983

Type species
- Exogaster gemma Richter, 1972

Genus of flies

Eucylindromyia is a subgenus of flies in the family Tachinidae.

== Species ==
There are four accepted species:

- Cylindromyia gemma (Richter, 1972)
- Cylindromyia robusta (Loew, 1847)
- Cylindromyia theodori Kugler, 1974
- Cylindromyia vallicola Ziegler & Gilasian, 2014
