= Malayocyptera =

Scientific classification
- Kingdom: Animalia
- Phylum: Arthropoda
- Clade: Pancrustacea
- Class: Insecta
- Order: Diptera
- Family: Tachinidae
- Genus: Cylindromyia
- Subgenus: Malayocyptera; Townsend, 1926

Type species
- Malayocyptera munita Townsend, 1926

Subgenus of flies

Malayocyptera is a subgenus of flies in the family Tachinidae.

== Species ==
- Cylindromyia agnieszkae Kolomiets, 1977
- Cylindromyia munita (Townsend, 1926)
- Cylindromyia pandulata (Matsumura, 1916)
- Cylindromyia umbripennis (Wulp, 1881)
