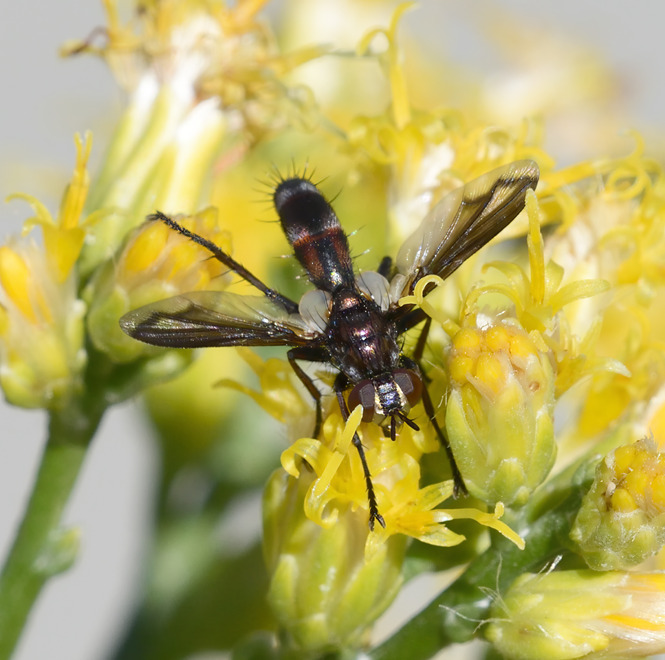

Scientific classification
- Kingdom: Animalia
- Phylum: Arthropoda
- Clade: Pancrustacea
- Class: Insecta
- Order: Diptera
- Family: Tachinidae
- Genus: Cylindromyia
- Subgenus: Apinocyptera
- Species: C. signatipennis

Binomial name
- Cylindromyia signatipennis (Wulp, 1892)

Synonyms
- Ocyptera signatipennis Wulp, 1892; Cylindromyia limbata Aldrich, 1926

= Cylindromyia signatipennis =

Species of fly

Cylindromyia signatipennis is a species of bristle fly in the family Tachinidae.

== Distribution ==
Costa Rica, Guatemala, Mexico, United States.
