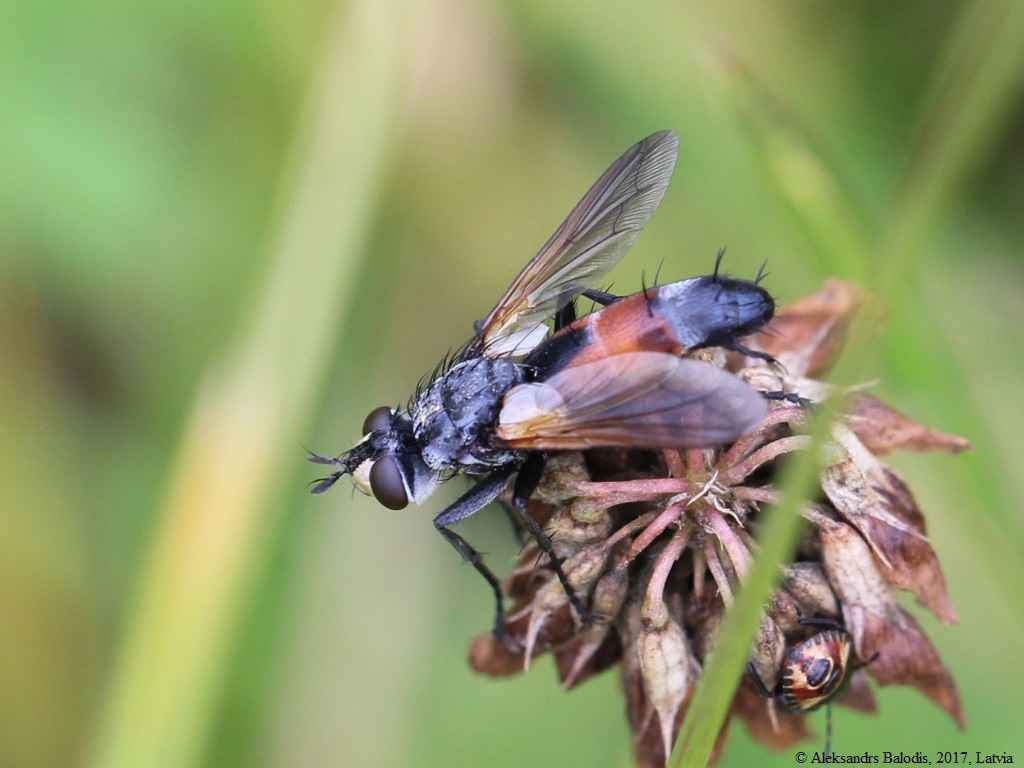
- Cylindromyia intermedia

Scientific classification
- Kingdom: Animalia
- Phylum: Arthropoda
- Clade: Pancrustacea
- Class: Insecta
- Order: Diptera
- Family: Tachinidae
- Genus: Cylindromyia
- Subgenus: Calocyptera; Herting, 1983

Type species
- Ocyptera intermedia Meigen, 1824

= Calocyptera =

Subgenus of flies

Calocyptera is a subgenus of flies in the family Tachinidae.

== Species ==
- Cylindromyia intermedia (Meigen, 1824)
