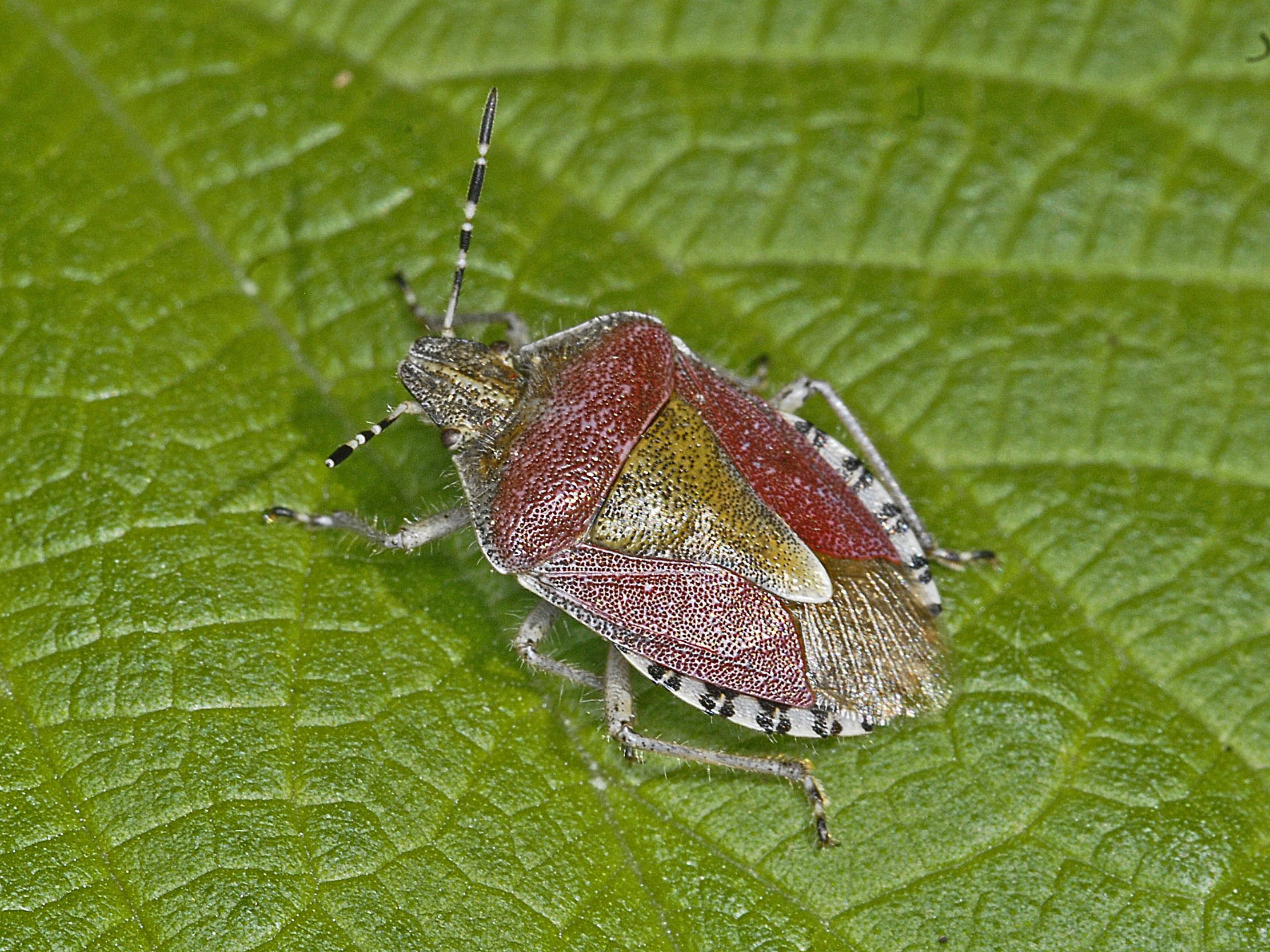
- Dolycoris baccarum

Scientific classification
- Domain: Eukaryota
- Kingdom: Animalia
- Phylum: Arthropoda
- Class: Insecta
- Order: Hemiptera
- Suborder: Heteroptera
- Family: Pentatomidae
- Genus: Dolycoris; Mulsant & Rey, 1866

= Dolycoris =

Genus of true bugs

Dolycoris is a genus of shield bug in the family Pentatomidae.

== Species ==
- Dolycoris alobatus Hasan & Afzal, 1990
- Dolycoris baccarum (Linnaeus, 1758) - Sloe Bug
- Dolycoris bengalensis Zaidi, 1995
- Dolycoris brachyserratus Hasan & Afzal, 1990
- Dolycoris formosanus Distant, 1887
- Dolycoris indicus Stål, 1876
- Dolycoris longispermathecus Hasan & Afzal, 1990
- Dolycoris numidicus Horváth, 1908
- Dolycoris penicillatus Horváth, 1904
- Dolycoris rotundiparatergite Hasan & Afzal, 1990
