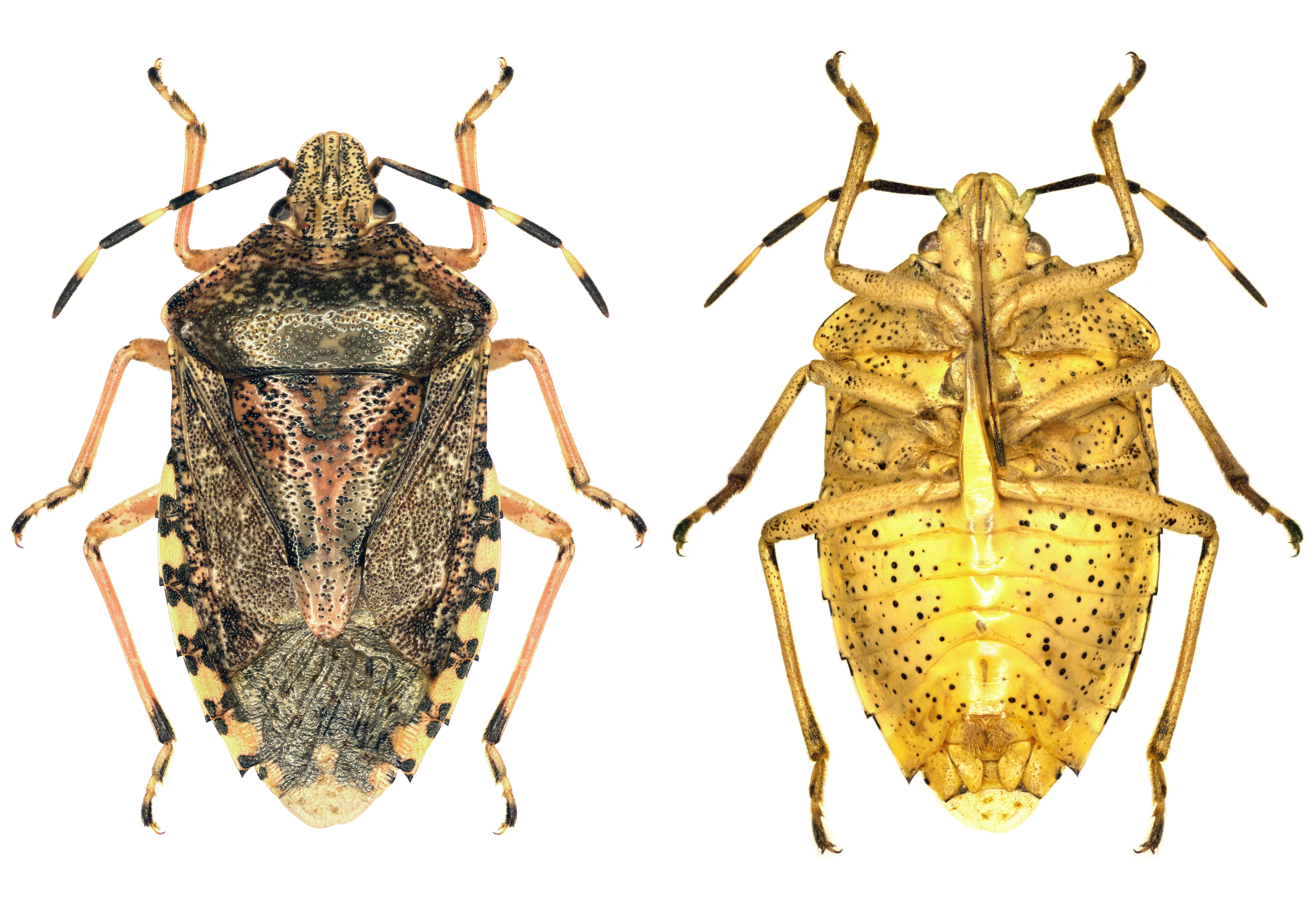
- Rhaphigaster nebulosa dorsal (left) and ventral (right) views

Scientific classification
- Kingdom: Animalia
- Phylum: Arthropoda
- Clade: Pancrustacea
- Class: Insecta
- Order: Hemiptera
- Suborder: Heteroptera
- Family: Pentatomidae
- Subfamily: Pentatominae
- Tribe: Pentatomini
- Genus: Rhaphigaster; Laporte, 1833

= Rhaphigaster =

Genus of stink bugs

Rhaphigaster is a genus of stink bugs in the family Pentatomidae. Its most well-known member is the mottled shieldbug, Rhaphigaster nebulosa.

== Description ==
Rhaphigaster are relatively large stink bugs. On the underside of the body is a spinelike process extending forward from the third abdominal sternite.

A feature of Rhaphigaster and some other pentatomid genera is the connexival groove. This is the line between the dorsal and ventral laterotergites of the connexiva, and it occurs on the dorsal surface of the connexiva (in most other pentatomids, this line is on the lateral margin instead). The exact position of the connexival groove in Rhapigaster is highly variable.

== Ecology ==
Stink bugs of this genus are herbivores. The common R. nebulosa feeds on a wide variety of plants in the families Anacardiaceae, Corylaceae, Fagaceae, Malaceae, Platanaceae, Poaceae, Rosaceae, Salicaceae and Ulmaceae. Rhaphigaster brevispina is associated with apple (also a host plant for R. nebulosa) and ash. Rhaphigaster genitalia has been recorded from chinaberry (Melia azedarach) and Chinese tallow (Triadica sebifera). Lastly, R. haraldi has been recorded from cork oak (Quercus suber).

== Species ==
Listed below are the species of Rhaphigaster, along with their distributions:

- Rhaphigaster brevispina Horváth, 1889 - Central Asia extending to China and Mongolia, and Israel
- Rhaphigaster genitalia Yang, 1934 - China
- Rhaphigaster haraldi Lindberg, 1932 - Maghreb
- Rhaphigaster nebulosa (Poda, 1761) - Europe (except Great Britain and Scandinavia), Maghreb, Near East, Caucasus, Central Asia, Pakistan

The type species, R. nebulosa, was originally described by Nikolaus Poda von Neuhaus in 1761 as Cimex nebulosus. It was transferred to the new genus Rhaphigaster by François-Louis Laporte in 1833.
