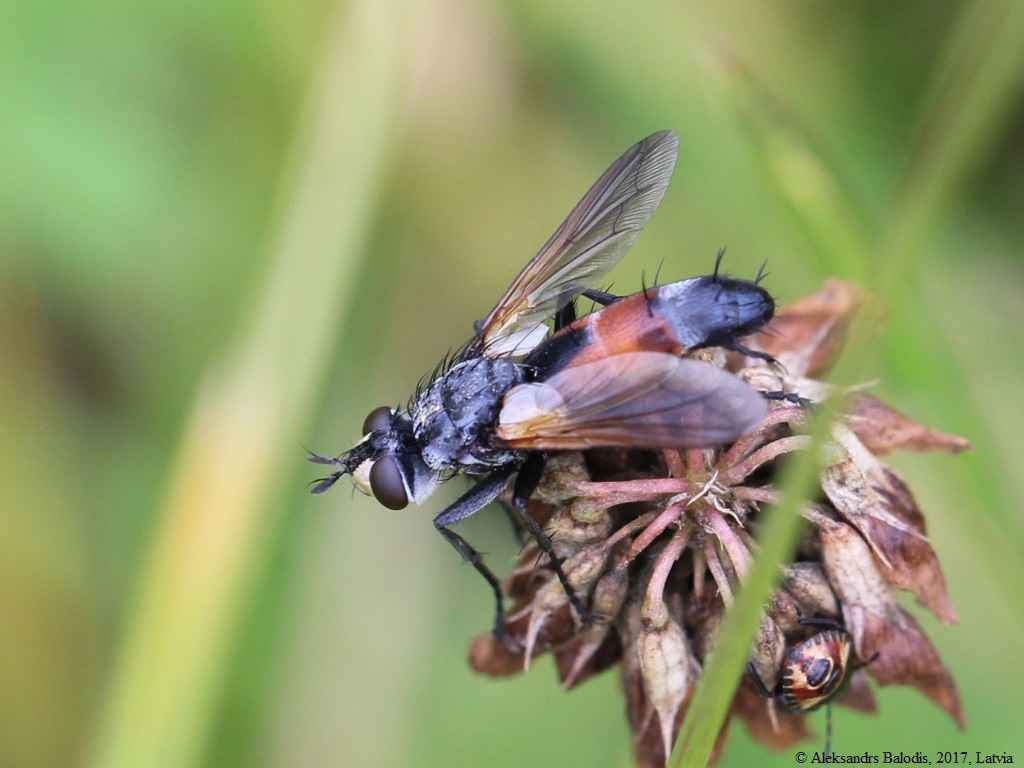

Scientific classification
- Kingdom: Animalia
- Phylum: Arthropoda
- Clade: Pancrustacea
- Class: Insecta
- Order: Diptera
- Family: Tachinidae
- Genus: Cylindromyia
- Subgenus: Calocyptera
- Species: C. intermedia

Binomial name
- Cylindromyia intermedia (Meigen, 1824)

Synonyms
- Ocyptera intermedia Meigen, 1824; Ocyptera excisa Loew, 1845; Ocyptera excisa var. rufiventris Strobl, 1906; Ocyptera reinigi Enderlein, 1934; Ocyptera scalaris Loew, 1844

= Cylindromyia intermedia =

Species of fly

Cylindromyia intermedia is a species of bristle fly in the family Tachinidae.

== Distribution ==
Canada, United States, Mexico, Kyrgyzstan, Tajikistan, Turkmenistan, Uzbekistan, China, Czech Republic, Hungary, Moldova, Poland, Romania, Slovakia, Ukraine, Andorra, Bulgaria, Corsica, Croatia, Greece, Italy, Macedonia, Malta, Portugal, Serbia, Slovenia, Spain, Turkey, Austria, Belgium, France, Germany, Netherlands, Switzerland, North Korea, South Korea, Iran, Israel, Palestine, Mongolia, Egypt, Russia, Transcaucasia.
