= Gerocyptera =

Scientific classification
- Kingdom: Animalia
- Phylum: Arthropoda
- Clade: Pancrustacea
- Class: Insecta
- Order: Diptera
- Family: Tachinidae
- Genus: Cylindromyia
- Subgenus: Gerocyptera; Townsend, 1916

Type species
- Trichoprosopa marginalis Walker, 1860

Synonyms
- Vespocyptera Townsend, 1927

Subgenus of flies

Gerocyptera is a subgenus of flies in the family Tachinidae.

== Species ==
- Cylindromyia divisa (Walker, 1864)
- Cylindromyia fenestrata Paramonov, 1956
- Cylindromyia marginalis (Walker, 1860)
- Cylindromyia petiolata (Townsend, 1927)
- Cylindromyia tristis (Bigot, 1878)
