= Ocypterula =

Scientific classification
- Kingdom: Animalia
- Phylum: Arthropoda
- Clade: Pancrustacea
- Class: Insecta
- Order: Diptera
- Family: Tachinidae
- Genus: Cylindromyia
- Subgenus: Ocypterula; Rondani, 1856

Type species
- Ocyptera pusilla Meigen, 1824

Synonyms
- Aubaea Robineau-Desvoidy, 1863

Subgenus of flies

Ocypterula is a subgenus of flies in the family Tachinidae.

== Species ==
- Cylindromyia pusilla (Meigen, 1824)
- Cylindromyia rectinervis Herting, 1973
