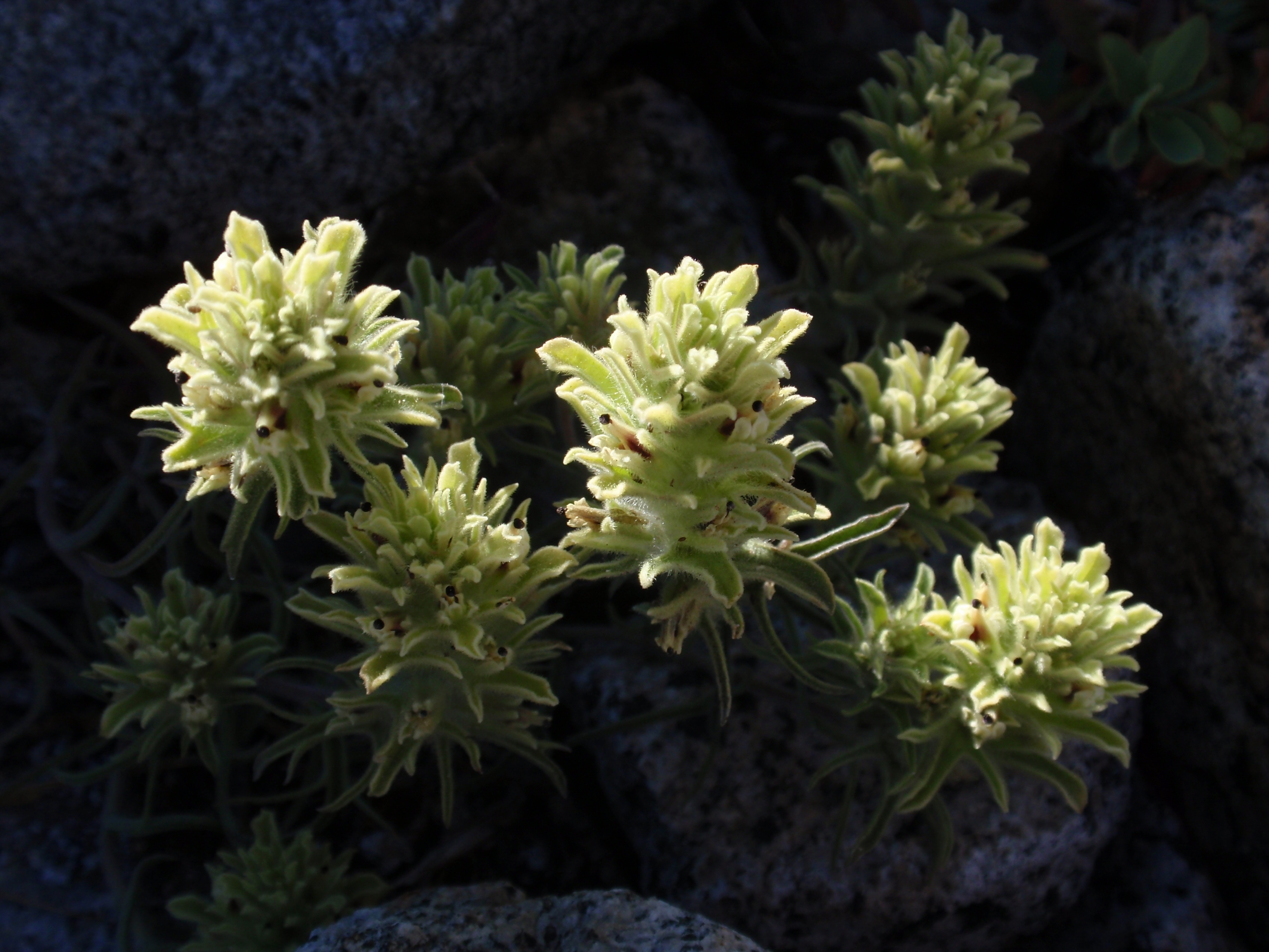

Scientific classification
- Kingdom: Plantae
- Clade: Tracheophytes
- Clade: Angiosperms
- Clade: Eudicots
- Clade: Asterids
- Order: Lamiales
- Family: Orobanchaceae
- Genus: Castilleja
- Species: C. nana

Binomial name
- Castilleja nana Eastw.

Synonyms
- Castilleja lapidicola

= Castilleja nana =

Species of flowering plant

Castilleja nana is a species of Indian paintbrush known by the common name dwarf alpine Indian paintbrush. It is native to the western United States from the Sierra Nevada of California east to Utah, where it grows in dry, rocky alpine habitat.

This is a small, hairy perennial herb growing up to about 25 centimeters tall but often remaining much smaller. The leaves are narrowly lance-shaped and up to about 3.5 centimeters long. The inflorescence is a cluster of pointed yellow-green, pink, or pale purple, hairy bracts. Between the bracts appear the small purple-spotted yellow flowers, which are pouched with tiny, protruding stigmas.
