= Cylindromyia nana =

Scientific classification
- Kingdom: Animalia
- Phylum: Arthropoda
- Clade: Pancrustacea
- Class: Insecta
- Order: Diptera
- Family: Tachinidae
- Genus: Cylindromyia
- Subgenus: Apinocyptera
- Species: C. nana

Binomial name
- Cylindromyia nana (Townsend, 1915)

Synonyms
- Cylindromyia limbata Aldrich, 1926; Odontocyptera nana Townsend, 1915

Species of fly

Cylindromyia nana is a species of bristle fly in the family Tachinidae.

== Distribution ==
United States, Mexico.
