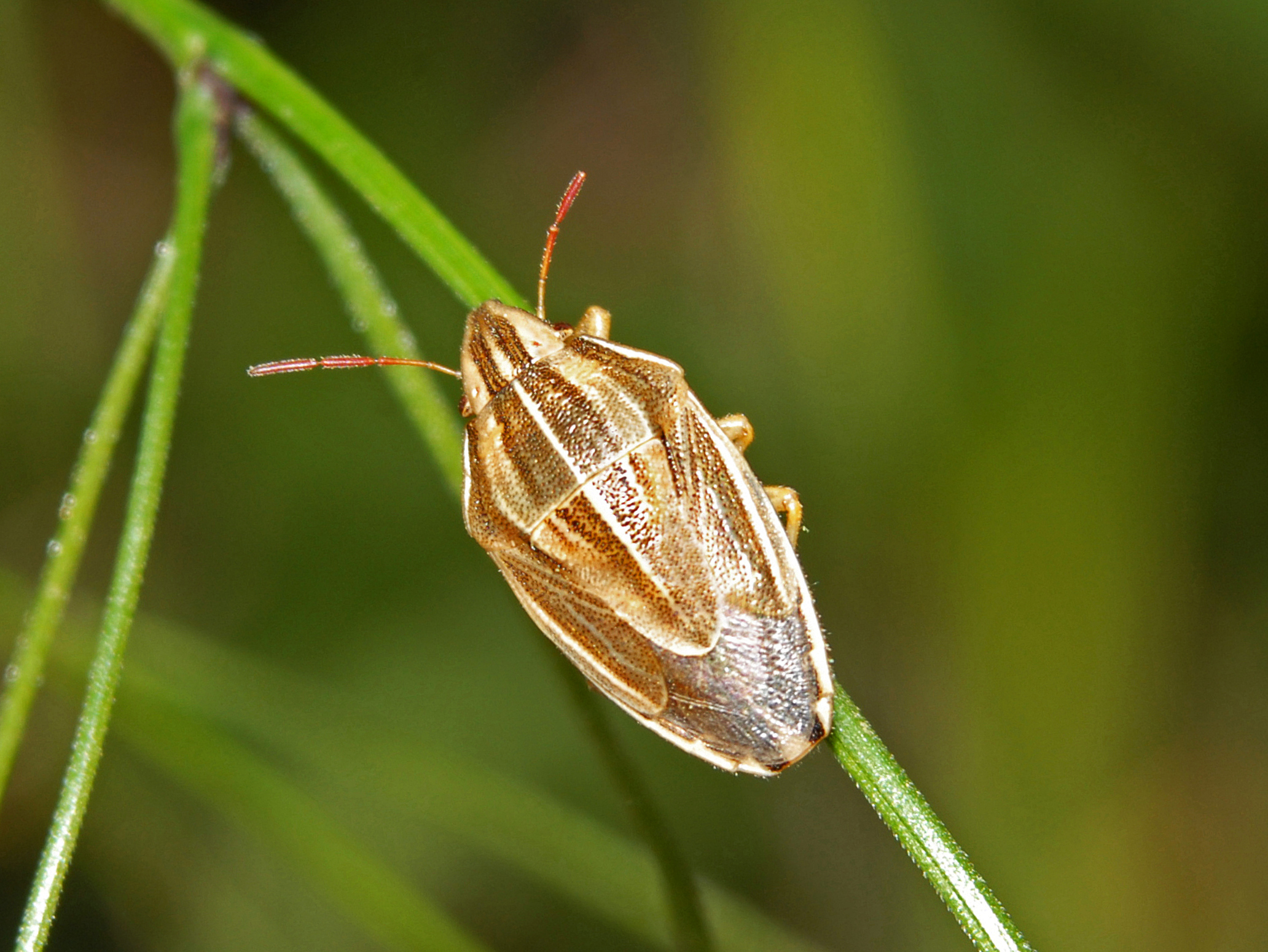

Scientific classification
- Kingdom: Animalia
- Phylum: Arthropoda
- Class: Insecta
- Order: Hemiptera
- Suborder: Heteroptera
- Family: Pentatomidae
- Genus: Aelia
- Species: A. acuminata

Binomial name
- Aelia acuminata Linnaeus, 1758

Synonyms
- Cimex acuminata Linnaeus, 1758; Cimex acuminatus Linnaeus, 1758

= Aelia acuminata =

Species of true bug

Aelia acuminata, common name bishop's mitre, is a species of shield bug belonging to the family Pentatomidae.

== Distribution ==
This species is present in most of Europe, in North Africa and in Northern Asia (excluding China).

== Habitat ==
These shield bugs mainly inhabit dry meadows and fields of cereals. They occurs in the Alps up to about 1300 meters above sea level.

== Description ==
Aelia acuminata can reach a length of 5–9 millimetres (0.20–0.35 in). These bugs have a slightly elongated body, with a pointed head (hence the species name acuminata). The basic body color is light brown with darker brown longitudinal. The nymphs are already rather similar to the adults, although they are still wingless.

== Biology ==
Aelia acuminata is a univoltine species. They have five nymphal stages in their development. Adults overwinter in litter or thickets. These bugs are herbivorous, feeding on various wild grasses and cereals. They suck many different types of grasses (Poaceae), mainly Festuca, Poa, Agrostis, Dactylis, Lolium and Bromus species. They can cause significant damage in cereal fields.

== Gallery ==
Mating. Video clip

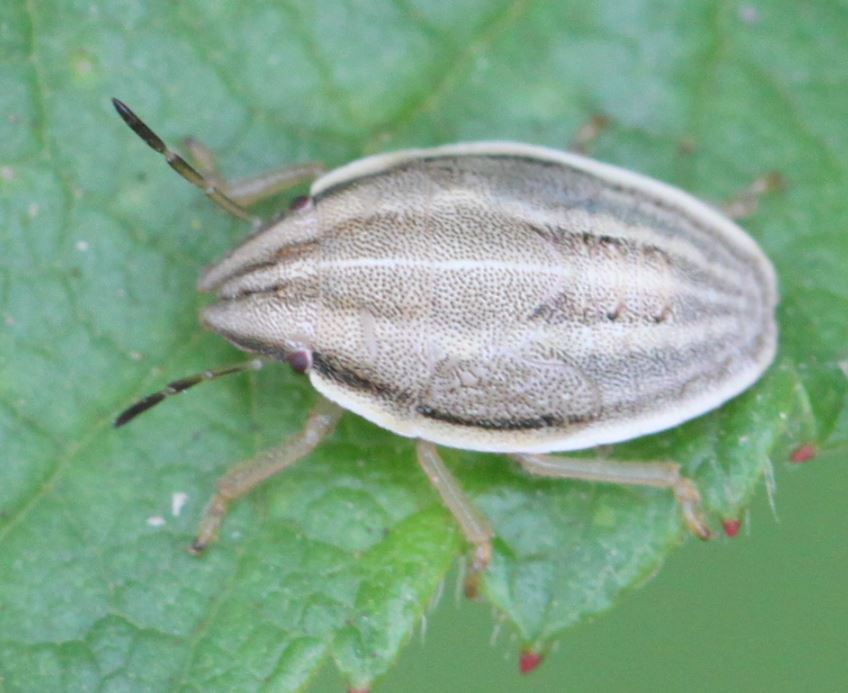
Nymph.

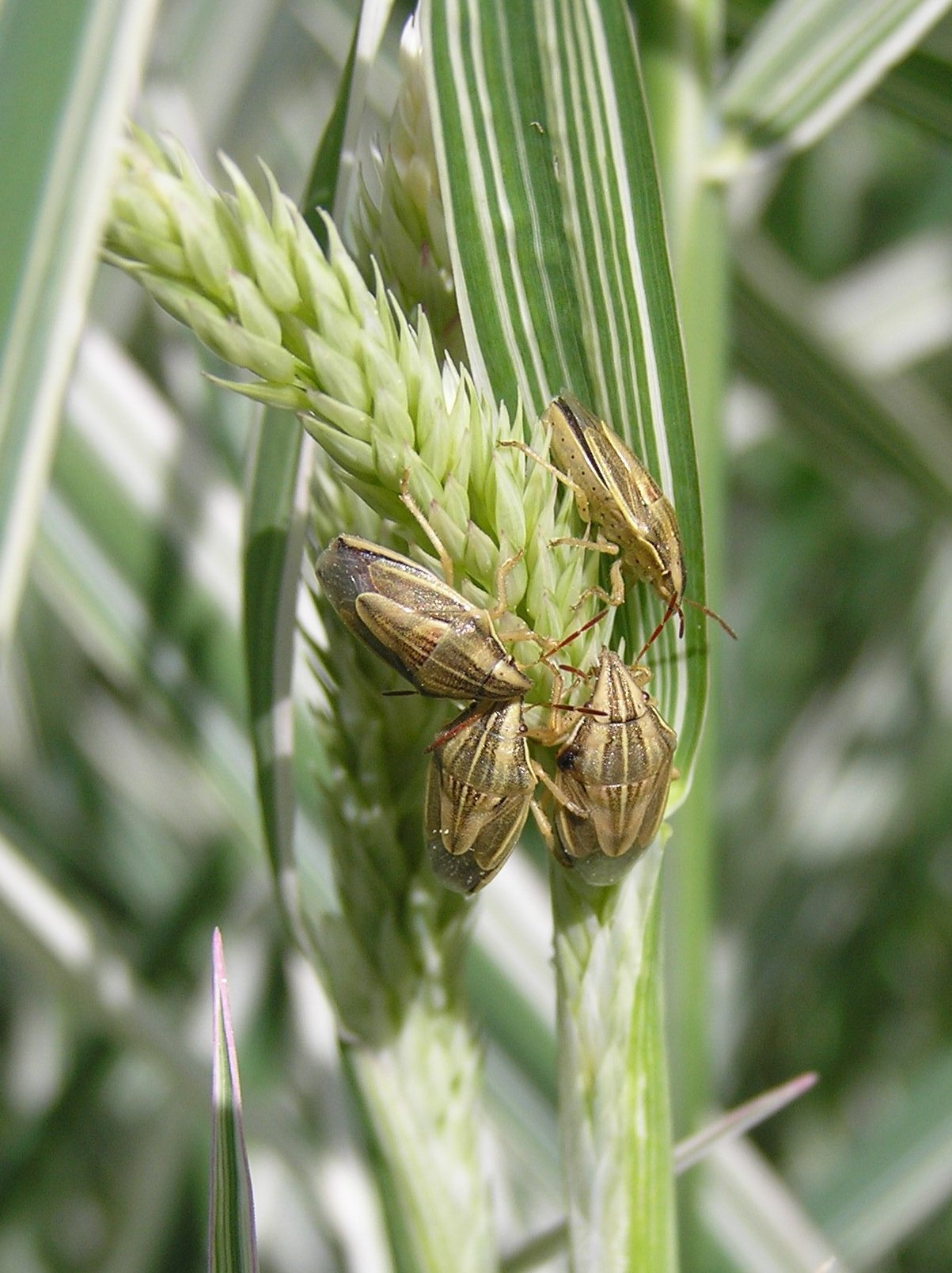
Adults feeding on Phalaris arundinacea

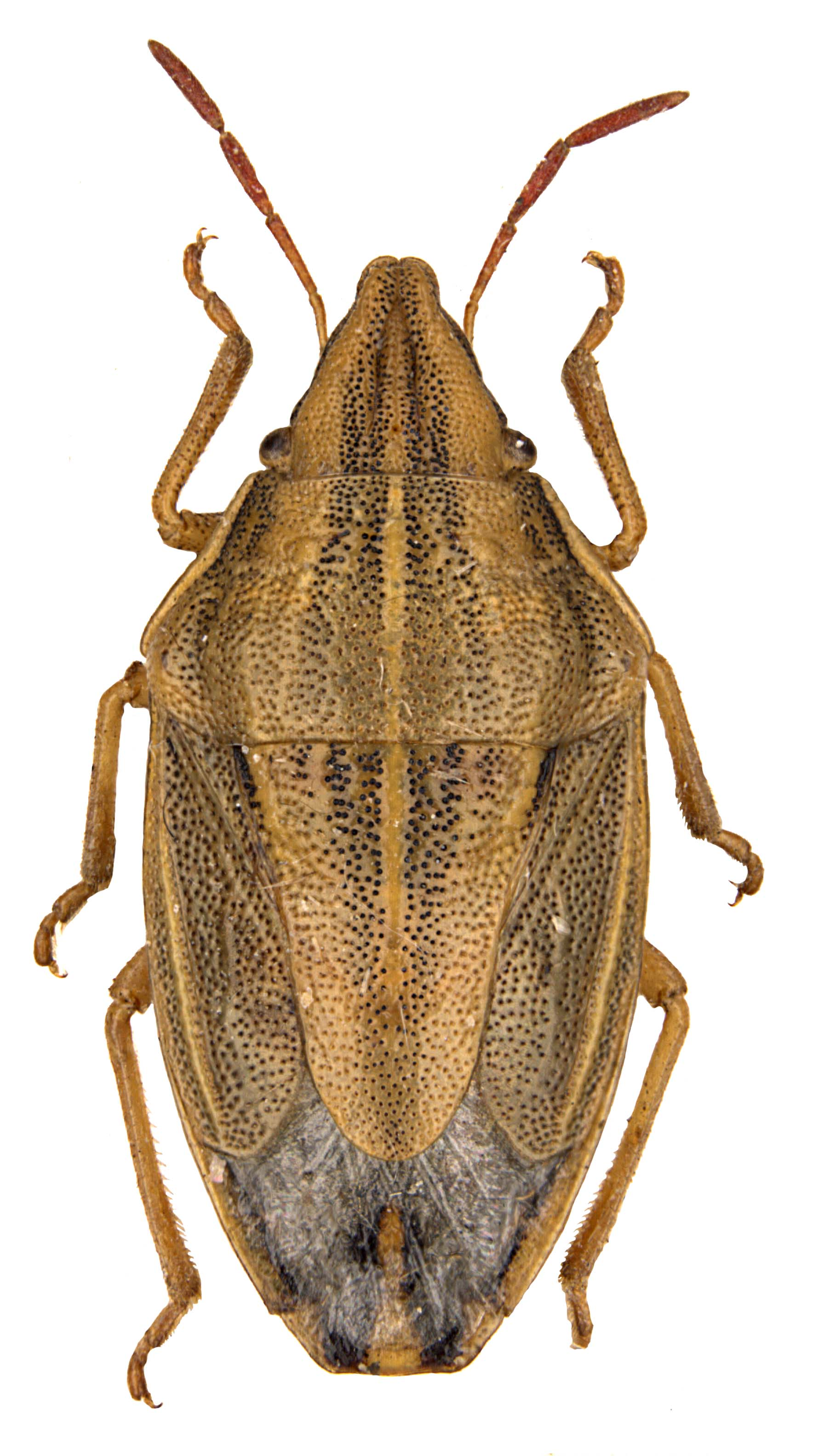
Museum specimen

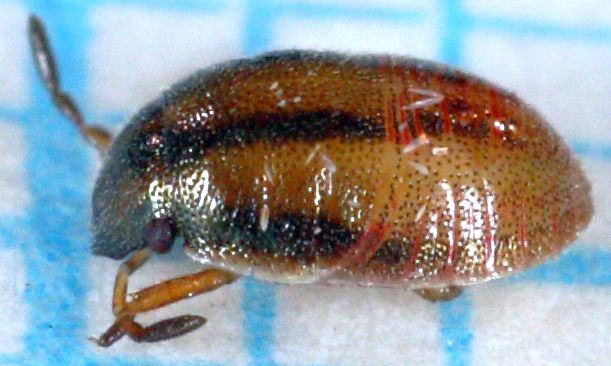
Nymph, first stage

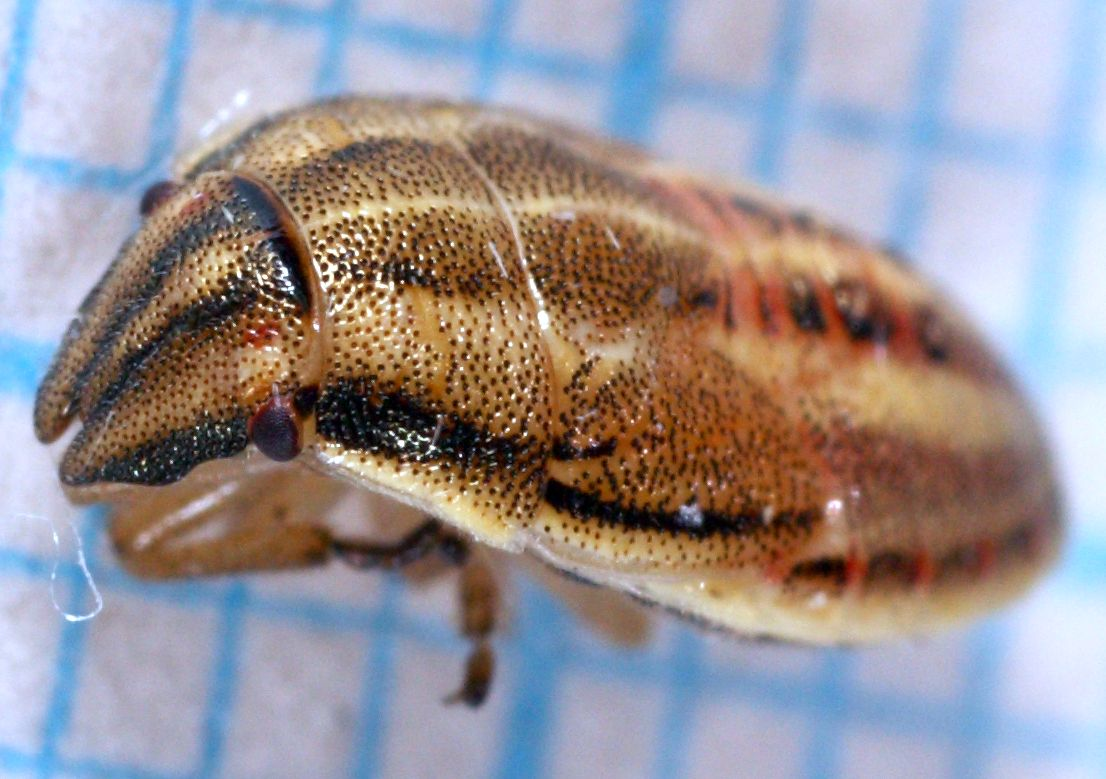
Nymph, last instar

== Bibliography ==
- Michael Chinery, Insectes de France et d'Europe occidentale, Paris, Flammarion, août 2012, 320 p. (ISBN 978-2-0812-8823-2), p. 72-73
- Amyot, C. J. B., and Audinet Serville (1843), Histoire Naturelle des Insectes Hémiptères
- Ruiz, D., M. Goula, E. Infiesta, T. Monleón, M. Pujol, and E. Gordún (2003) Guía de identificación de los chinches de los cereales (Insecta, Heteroptera) encontrados en los trigos españoles, Boletín de Sanidad Vegetal, vol. 29, no. 4
