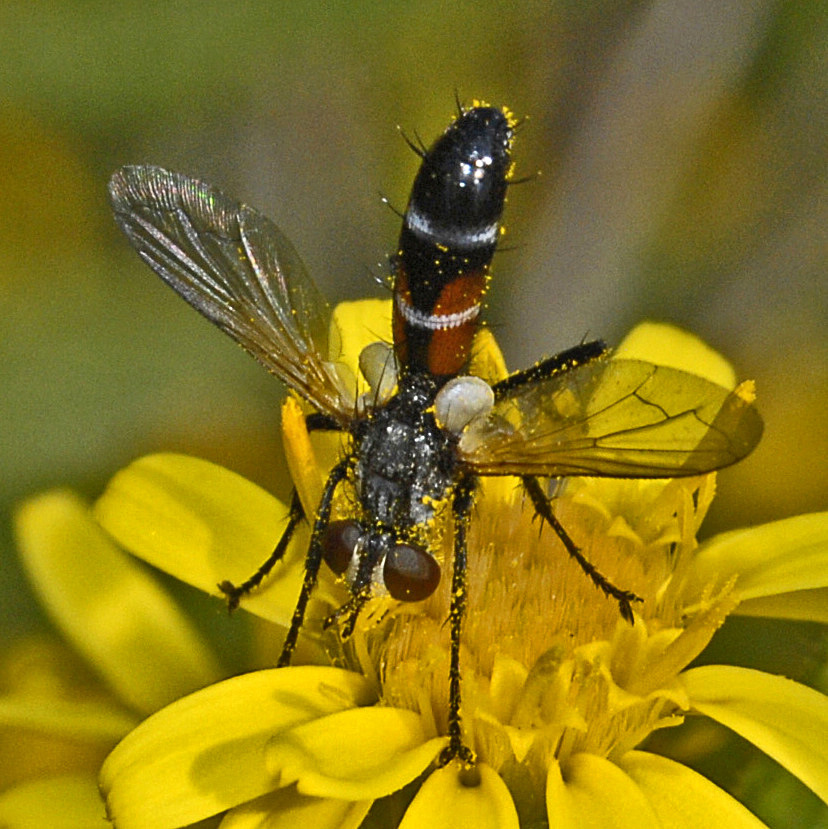
- Cylindromyia interrupta

Scientific classification
- Kingdom: Animalia
- Phylum: Arthropoda
- Clade: Pancrustacea
- Class: Insecta
- Order: Diptera
- Family: Tachinidae
- Subfamily: Phasiinae
- Tribe: Cylindromyiini
- Genus: Cylindromyia; Meigen, 1803

Type species
- Musca brassicaria Fabricius, 1775

Synonyms
- Androcyptera Townsend, 1927; Aubaeina Enderlein, 1937; Catocyptera Townsend, 1927; Chaetocyptera Enderlein, 1936; Conopisoma Speiser, 1910; Cylindromya Oken, 1815; Dolichocyptera Townsend, 1931; Dupuisia Lehrer, 1973; Ecatocyptera Townsend, 1927; Ecatocypterops Townsend, 1935; Elaphroptera Gistel, 1848; Eocyptera Townsend, 1927; Formicocyptera Townsend, 1933; Melanocyptera Townsend, 1927; Ociptera Rondani, 1862; Ocyptea Fallén, 1810; Ocyptera Latreille, 1804; Ocypteropsis Townsend, 1916; Ocypteryx Leach, 1817; Ocypteryx Townsend, 1931; Opsocyptera Townsend, 1927; Parthenia Robineau-Desvoidy, 1830; Partheniella Herting, 1983; Plesiocyptera Brauer & von Berganstamm, 1893; Thyrsocyptera Enderlein, 1936; Vespocyptera Townsend, 1927

= Cylindromyia =

Genus of flies

Cylindromyia is a genus of flies in the family Tachinidae. It has a cosmopolitan distribution and contains 126 accepted species in 13 subgenera. It includes common and important parasitoids of Hemiptera, typically Pentatomidae (shield bugs or stink bugs).

== Species ==
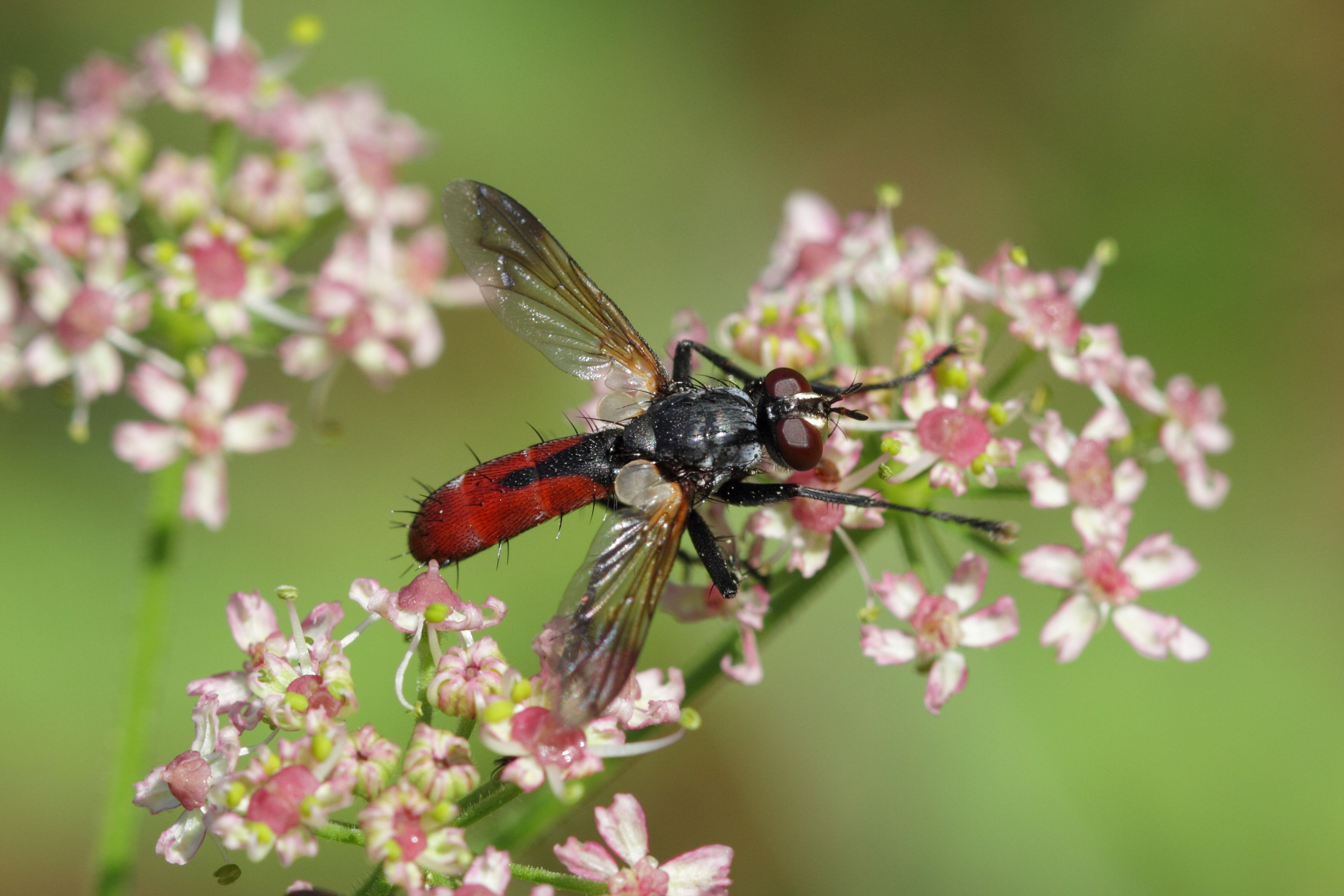
Cylindromyia bicolor

- Subgenus Apinocyptera Townsend, 1915

- Cylindromyia nana (Townsend, 1915)
- Cylindromyia platensis Guimarães, 1976
- Cylindromyia signatipennis (Wulp, 1892)
- Cylindromyia thompsoni Guimarães, 1976

- Subgenus Calocyptera Herting, 1983

- Cylindromyia intermedia (Meigen, 1824)

- Subgenus Cylindromyia Meigen, 1803

- Cylindromyia aldrichi Cortés, 1944
- Cylindromyia alticola Aldrich, 1926
- Cylindromyia angustipennis Herting, 1983
- Cylindromyia anthracina Guimarães, 1976
- Cylindromyia apicalis (Bigot, 1878)
- Cylindromyia armata Aldrich, 1926
- Cylindromyia arnaudi Guimarães, 1976
- Cylindromyia atra (Röder, 1885)
- Cylindromyia atrata (Fabricius, 1805)
- Cylindromyia aurora Herting, 1983
- Cylindromyia bakeri Aldrich, 1926
- Cylindromyia bicolor (Olivier, 1811)
- Cylindromyia binotata (Bigot, 1878)
- Cylindromyia brasiliana (Townsend, 1927)
- Cylindromyia brassicaria (Fabricius, 1775)
- Cylindromyia braueri O'Hara & Cerretti, 2016
- Cylindromyia brevicornis (Loew, 1844)
- Cylindromyia carinata (Townsend, 1927)
- Cylindromyia crassa (Loew, 1845)
- Cylindromyia decora Aldrich, 1926
- Cylindromyia dolichocera Richter, 1972
- Cylindromyia dorsalis (Wiedemann, 1830)
- Cylindromyia dotadas (Walker, 1849)
- Cylindromyia euchenor (Walker, 1849)
- Cylindromyia fumipennis (Bigot, 1878)
- Cylindromyia minor (Röder, 1885)
- Cylindromyia miracula (Speiser, 1910)
- Cylindromyia montana Kugler, 1974
- Cylindromyia nigra (Bigot, 1885)
- Cylindromyia obscura (Bigot, 1878)
- Cylindromyia pictipennis (Macquart, 1835)
- Cylindromyia pilipes (Loew, 1844)
- Cylindromyia pirioni (Townsend, 1931)
- Cylindromyia porteri (Brèthes, 1925)
- Cylindromyia propusilla Sabrosky & Arnaud, 1965
- Cylindromyia rubida (Loew, 1854)
- Cylindromyia rufipes (Meigen, 1824)
- Cylindromyia uncinata Gilasian, Talebi & Ziegler, 2014
- Cylindromyia uruguayensis Guimarães, 1976
- Cylindromyia xylotina (Egger, 1860)

- Subgenus Eucylindromyia Herting, 1983

- Cylindromyia gemma (Richter, 1972)
- Cylindromyia robusta (Loew, 1847)
- Cylindromyia theodori Kugler, 1974
- Cylindromyia vallicola Ziegler & Gilasian, 2014

- Subgenus Exogaster Rondani, 1856

- Cylindromyia persica Tschorsnig, 2000
- Cylindromyia rufifrons (Loew, 1844)

- Subgenus Gerocyptera Townsend, 1916

- Cylindromyia divisa (Walker, 1864)
- Cylindromyia fenestrata Paramonov, 1956
- Cylindromyia marginalis (Walker, 1860)
- Cylindromyia petiolata (Townsend, 1927)
- Cylindromyia tristis (Bigot, 1878)

- Subgenus Ichneumonops Townsend, 1908

- Cylindromyia mirabilis (Townsend, 1908)

- Subgenus Malayocyptera Townsend, 1926

- Cylindromyia agnieszkae Kolomiets, 1977
- Cylindromyia munita (Townsend, 1926)
- Cylindromyia pandulata (Matsumura, 1916)
- Cylindromyia umbripennis (Wulp, 1881)

- Subgenus Neocyptera Townsend, 1916

- Cylindromyia arator Reinhard, 1956
- Cylindromyia auriceps (Meigen, 1838)
- Cylindromyia compressa Aldrich, 1926
- Cylindromyia hermonensis Kugler, 1974
- Cylindromyia interrupta (Meigen, 1824)
- Cylindromyia scapularis (Loew, 1845)

- Subgenus Ocypterula Rondani, 1856

- Cylindromyia pusilla (Meigen, 1824)
- Cylindromyia rectinervis Herting, 1973

- Unplaced to subgenus

- Cylindromyia aberrans (Villeneuve, 1936)
- Cylindromyia ampla Cantrell, 1984
- Cylindromyia angustissimifrons Paramonov, 1956
- Cylindromyia atratula Malloch, 1930
- Cylindromyia atricauda Aldrich, 1934
- Cylindromyia aurigans Cantrell, 1984
- Cylindromyia aurohumera (Emden, 1945)
- Cylindromyia bigoti Cantrell, 1984
- Cylindromyia bimacula (Walker, 1849)
- Cylindromyia brunnea Malloch, 1930
- Cylindromyia californica (Bigot, 1878)
- Cylindromyia completa Curran, 1927
- Cylindromyia cuspidata Cantrell, 1984
- Cylindromyia deserta (Villeneuve, 1936)
- Cylindromyia epytus (Walker, 1849)
- Cylindromyia eronis Curran, 1927
- Cylindromyia ethelia Curran, 1934
- Cylindromyia evibrissata (Townsend, 1927)
- Cylindromyia expansa Cantrell, 1984
- Cylindromyia flavibasis (Villeneuve, 1916)
- Cylindromyia flavitibia Sun & Marshall, 1995
- Cylindromyia fuscipennis (Wiedemann, 1819)
- Cylindromyia hamata Cantrell, 1984
- Cylindromyia hemimelaena (Bezzi, 1923)
- Cylindromyia hirtipleura Malloch, 1931
- Cylindromyia hobartana Paramonov, 1956
- Cylindromyia lavinia Curran, 1934
- Cylindromyia luciflua (Villeneuve, 1944)
- Cylindromyia maroccana Tschorsnig, 1997
- Cylindromyia nigricosta Malloch, 1930
- Cylindromyia nigrina (Wulp, 1883)
- Cylindromyia ochrescens (Townsend, 1931)
- Cylindromyia ocypteroides (Bezzi, 1908)
- Cylindromyia orientalis (Townsend, 1927)
- Cylindromyia oxyphera (Villeneuve, 1926)
- Cylindromyia pacifica Bezzi, 1928
- Cylindromyia pedunculata Curran, 1927
- Cylindromyia pilosa Cantrell, 1984
- Cylindromyia rieki Paramonov, 1956
- Cylindromyia rufifemur Paramonov, 1956
- Cylindromyia rufohumera O'Hara & Cerretti, 2016
- Cylindromyia sensua Curran, 1934
- Cylindromyia signata (Townsend, 1915)
- Cylindromyia simplex (Fallén, 1820)
- Cylindromyia simplex (Bigot, 1878)
- Cylindromyia soror (Wiedemann, 1830)
- Cylindromyia sternalis Reinhard, 1955
- Cylindromyia sydneyensis Malloch, 1930
- Cylindromyia tibetensis Sun & Marshall, 1995
- Cylindromyia townsendi Guimarães, 1971
- Cylindromyia tricolor Malloch, 1930
- Cylindromyia unguiculata Paramonov, 1956
- Cylindromyia uniformis Aldrich, 1926
- Cylindromyia westralica Paramonov, 1956
- Cylindromyia xiphias (Bezzi, 1908)
