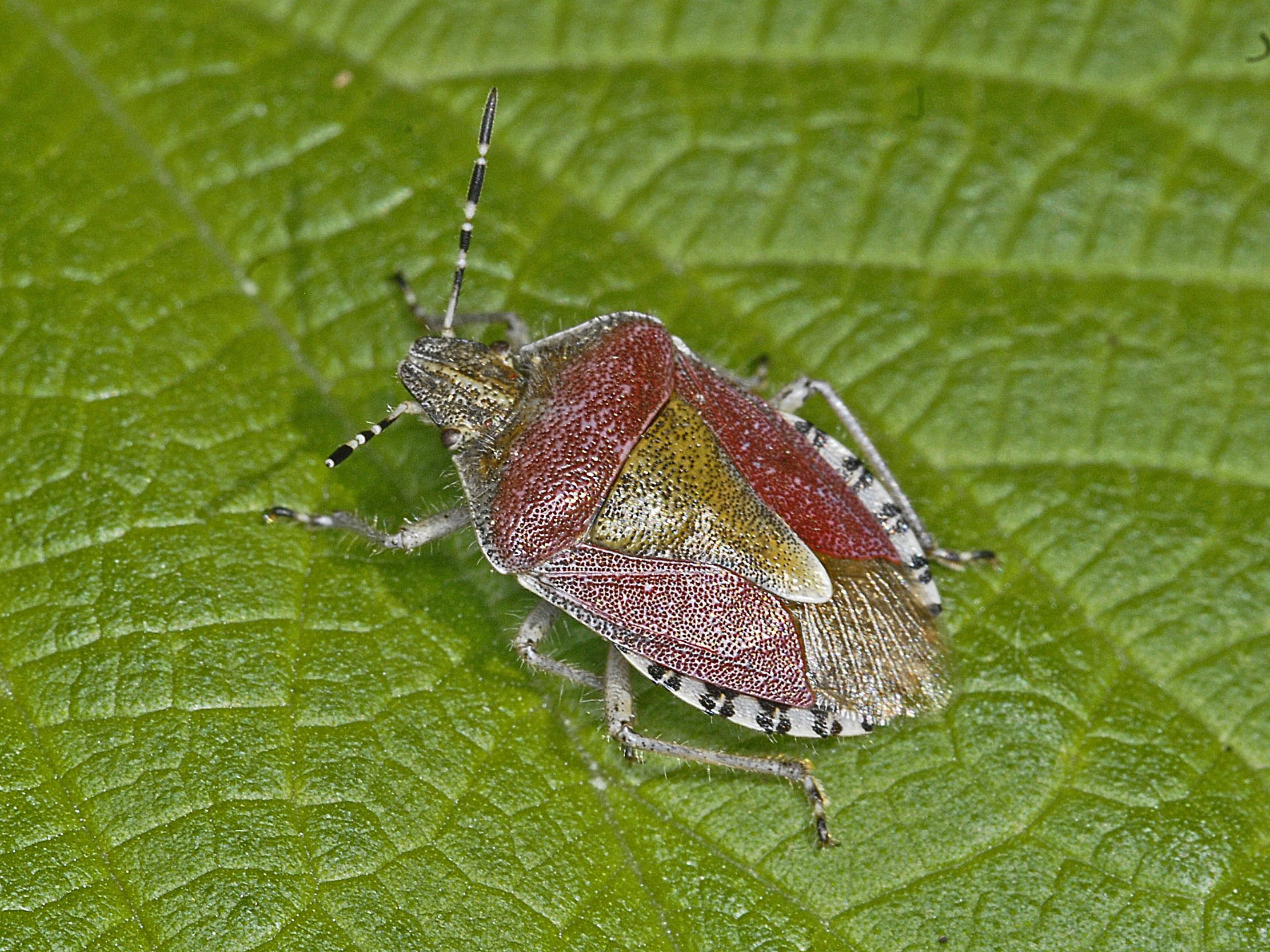
- Adult of Dolycoris baccarum. Common form

Scientific classification
- Kingdom: Animalia
- Phylum: Arthropoda
- Clade: Pancrustacea
- Class: Insecta
- Order: Hemiptera
- Suborder: Heteroptera
- Family: Pentatomidae
- Genus: Dolycoris
- Species: D. baccarum

Binomial name
- Dolycoris baccarum (Linnaeus, 1758)

Synonyms
- Aelia depressa Westwood, 1837; Cimex albidus Gmelin, 1790; Cimex subater Harris, 1780; Cimex verbasci DeGeer, 1773; Dolycoris brevipilis Reuter, 1891; Pentatoma inconcisa Walker, 1867; Cimex baccarum Linnaeus, 175

= Dolycoris baccarum =

Species of true bug

Dolycoris baccarum, the sloe bug or hairy shieldbug, is a species of shield bug in the family Pentatomidae.

== Distribution and habitat ==
This species is widespread in most of Europe and Central Asia. These shield bugs mainly inhabit hedgerows and woodland edges, fields, forests, parks and gardens.

== Description ==
Dolycoris baccarum can reach a length of about 10–12.5 millimetres (0.39–0.49 in). The basic color of pronotum and elytra is quite variable, but usually it is reddish purple, while scutellum is ocher. During the winter the basic color is dull brown. The whole body is quite hairy. The antennae are made by 4-5 black and white sections and the margins of the abdomen (connexivum) are alternately mottled with whitish and black. The male and female are very similar. A related species encountered in Europe is Dolycoris numidicus.

== Biology ==
It is univoltine in the northern part of the range and bivoltine in the warmer southern areas. Adults of these shield bugs can be found all year around, as they overwinter. They emerge in the following spring, when they mate and females lay eggs. By the end of summer the new generation of adults appear. Nymphs feed on many plants, especially Rosaceae and Asteraceae species, Linaria vulgaris and Lamium album. Adults can be found frequently on shrubs feeding on berries, especially Honeysuckle and Raspberries. Despite the common name sloe bug, neither the larvae nor the adults feed on Sloe (Prunus spinosa).

== Gallery ==
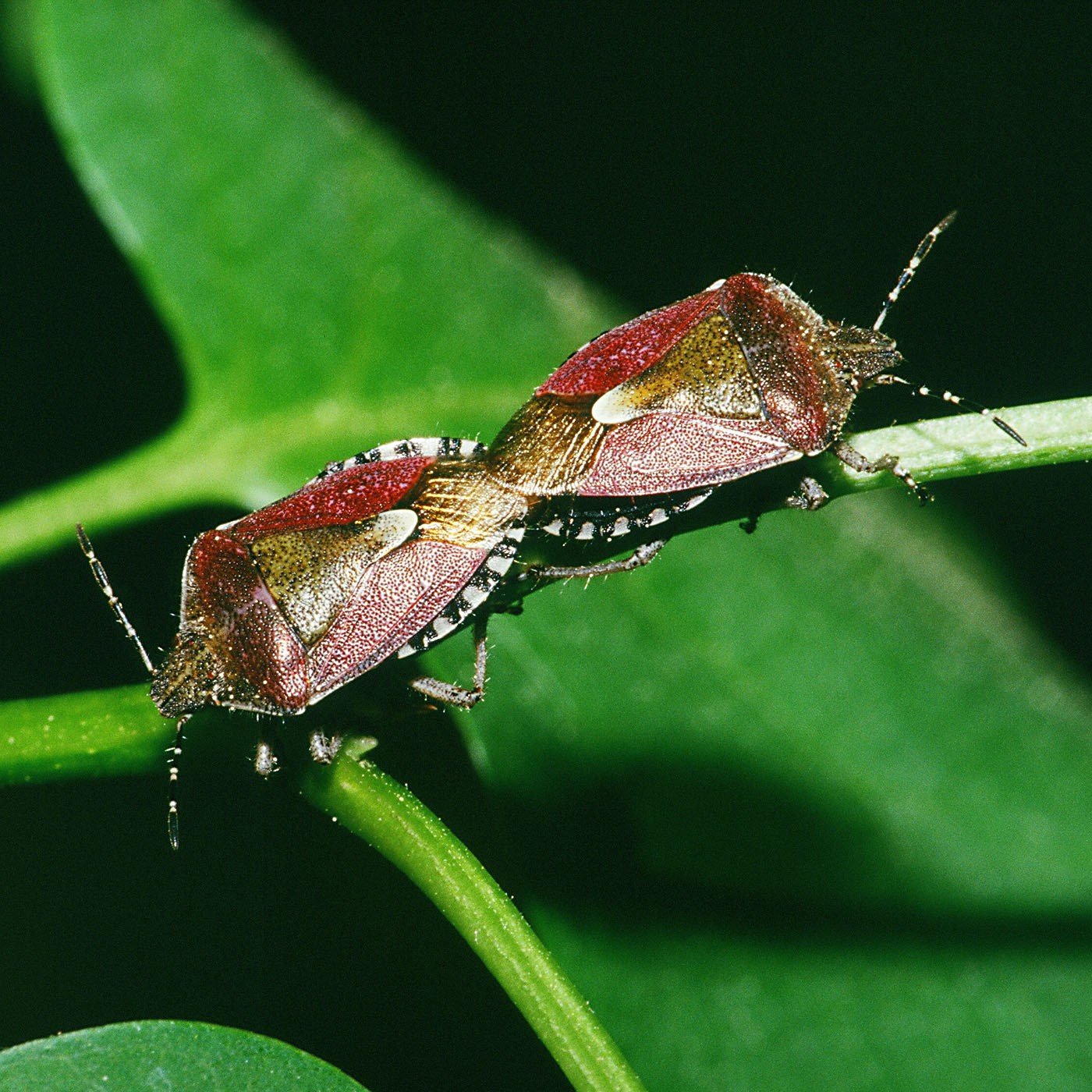
Mating

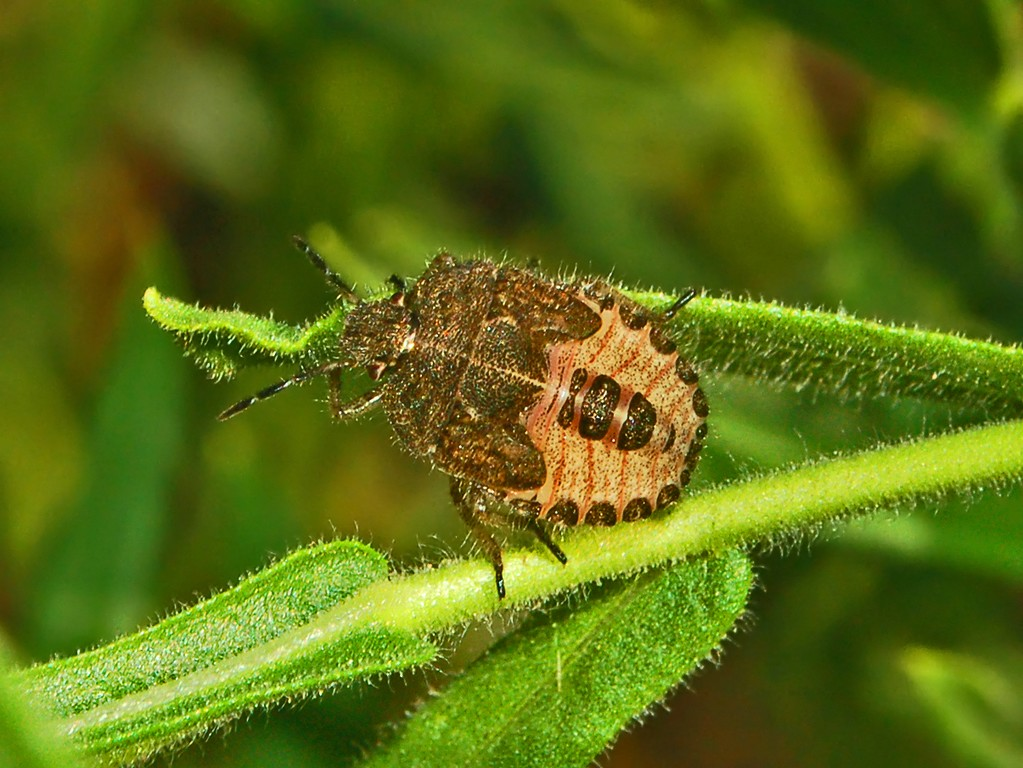
Mid nymph

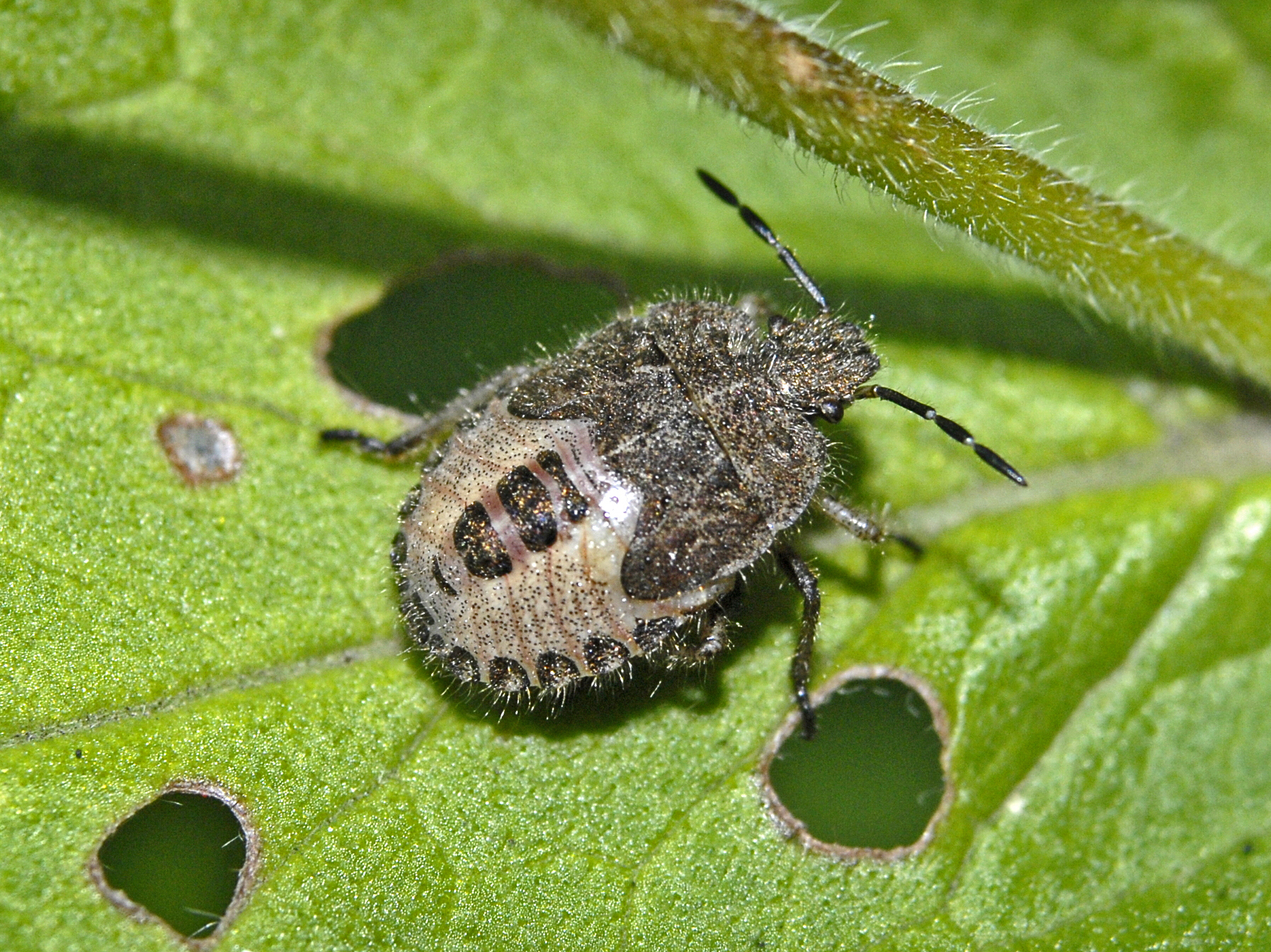
Late nymph

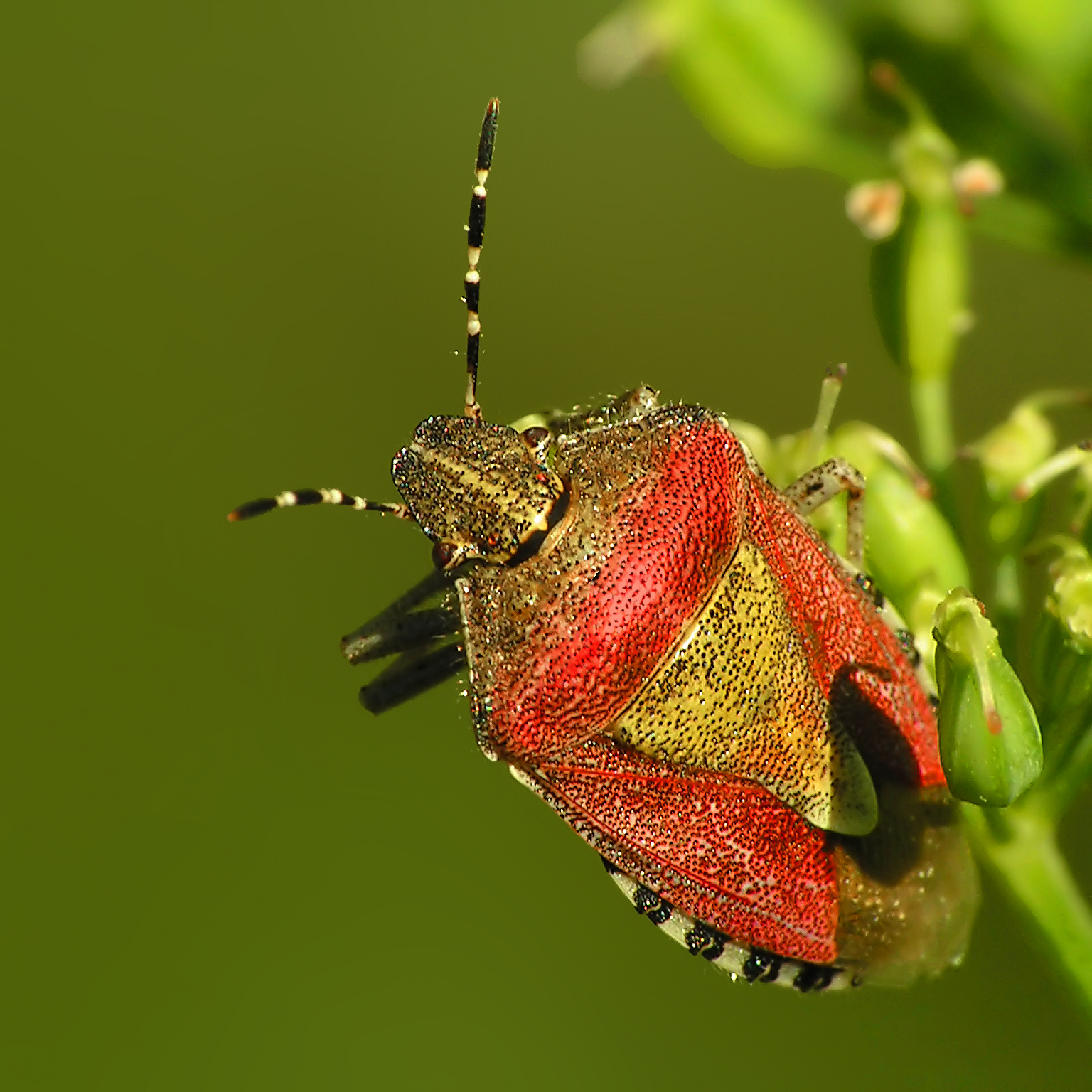
Adult. Red specimen

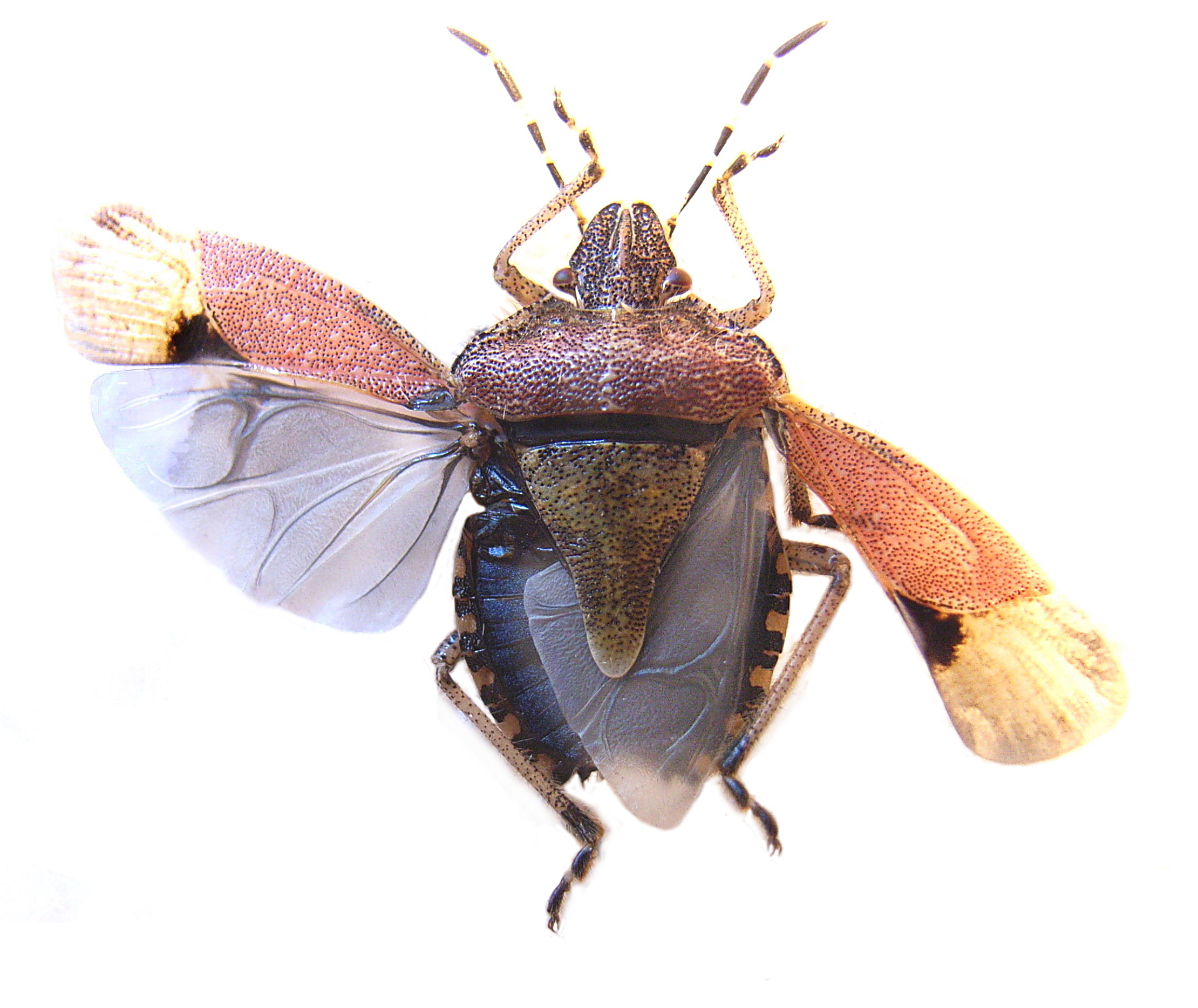
Mounted specimen showing opened wings

Clip of Dolycoris baccarum in copula

Close-up

Close-up
