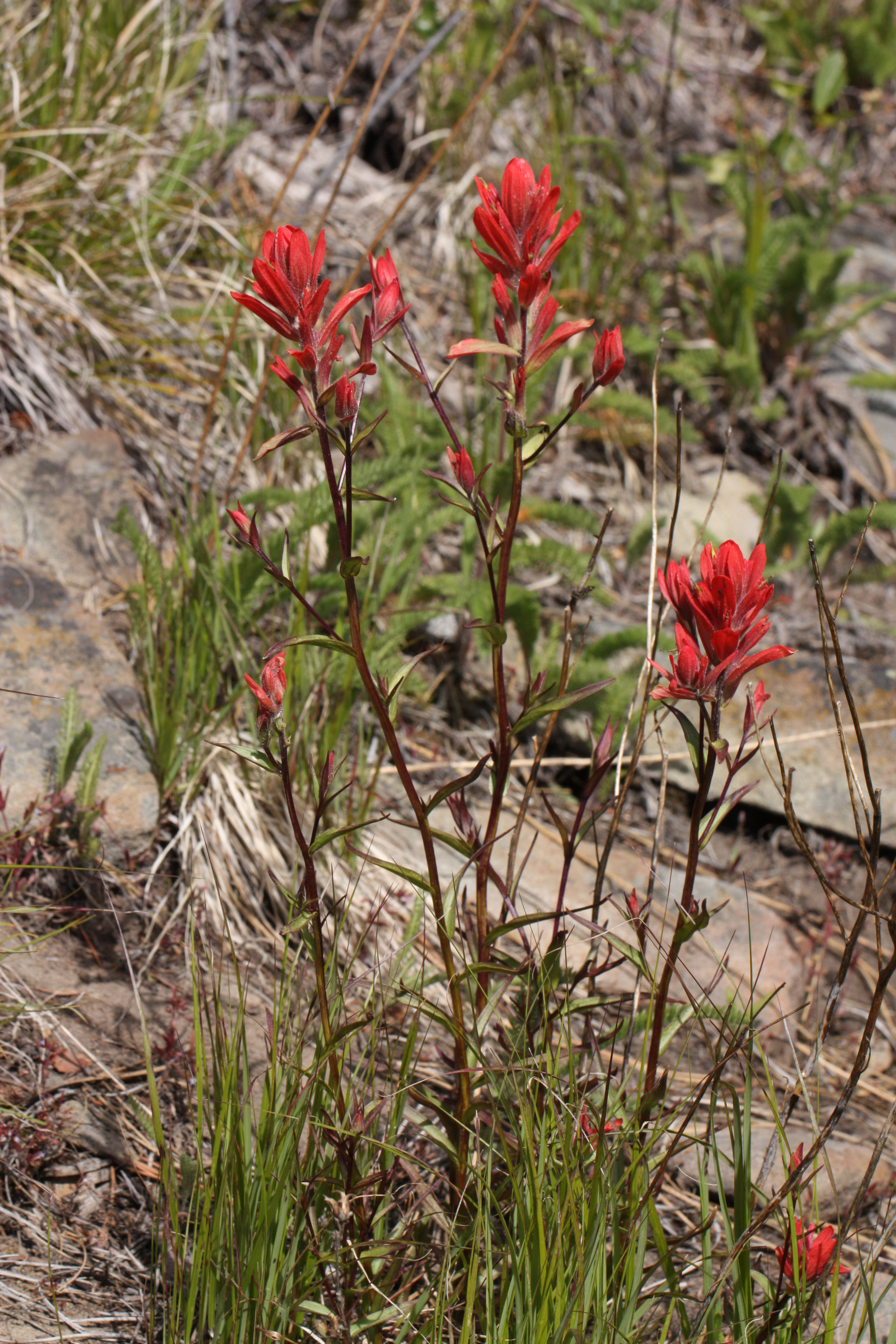

Conservation status
- Secure (NatureServe)

Scientific classification
- Kingdom: Plantae
- Clade: Tracheophytes
- Clade: Angiosperms
- Clade: Eudicots
- Clade: Asterids
- Order: Lamiales
- Family: Orobanchaceae
- Genus: Castilleja
- Species: C. miniata

Binomial name
- Castilleja miniata Dougl. ex Benth.

Synonyms
- List: Castilleja crispula; Castilleja dixonii; Castilleja fulva; Castilleja hyetophila; Castilleja inconstans; Castilleja montana; Castilleja oblongifolia; Castilleja trinervis; Castilleja tweedyi; Castilleja variabilis; Castilleja vreelandii; Castilleja confusa; Euchroma integrifolia

= Castilleja miniata =

Plant species in the broomrape family

Castilleja miniata is a species of Indian paintbrush known by the common name giant red paintbrush. It is native to western North America from Alaska to Ontario to California to New Mexico, where it grows usually in moist places in a wide variety of habitat types.

== Description ==
Giant red paintbrush is a perennial herb that grows 12 to 80 centimeters tall, though occasionally reaching 1 meter, with few to many branching stems. It can have a taproot or grow from rhizomes with branching roots. The lance-shaped leaves are 3 to 6 centimeters long, pointed, and coated in thin hairs. The inflorescence is made up of bright red to pale orange or orange-tipped bracts. Between the bracts emerge the yellow-green, red-edged tubular flowers. Flowers bloom May to September.

Because most species of the genus are parasitic on other plants, sophisticated networks are formed between their roots and those of other species. They therefore cannot be transplanted in most cases. It frequently will use willow as a host plant. Its native habitats include wet mountain meadows and stream banks below 11,000 feet (3,400 m).

== Taxonomy ==
Castilleja miniata was given its scientific name and described in 1838 by George Bentham attributing it to David Douglas. It is a species of Castilleja classified in the family Orobanchaceae.

=== Varieties ===
According to Plants of the World Online there are four varieties of the species:

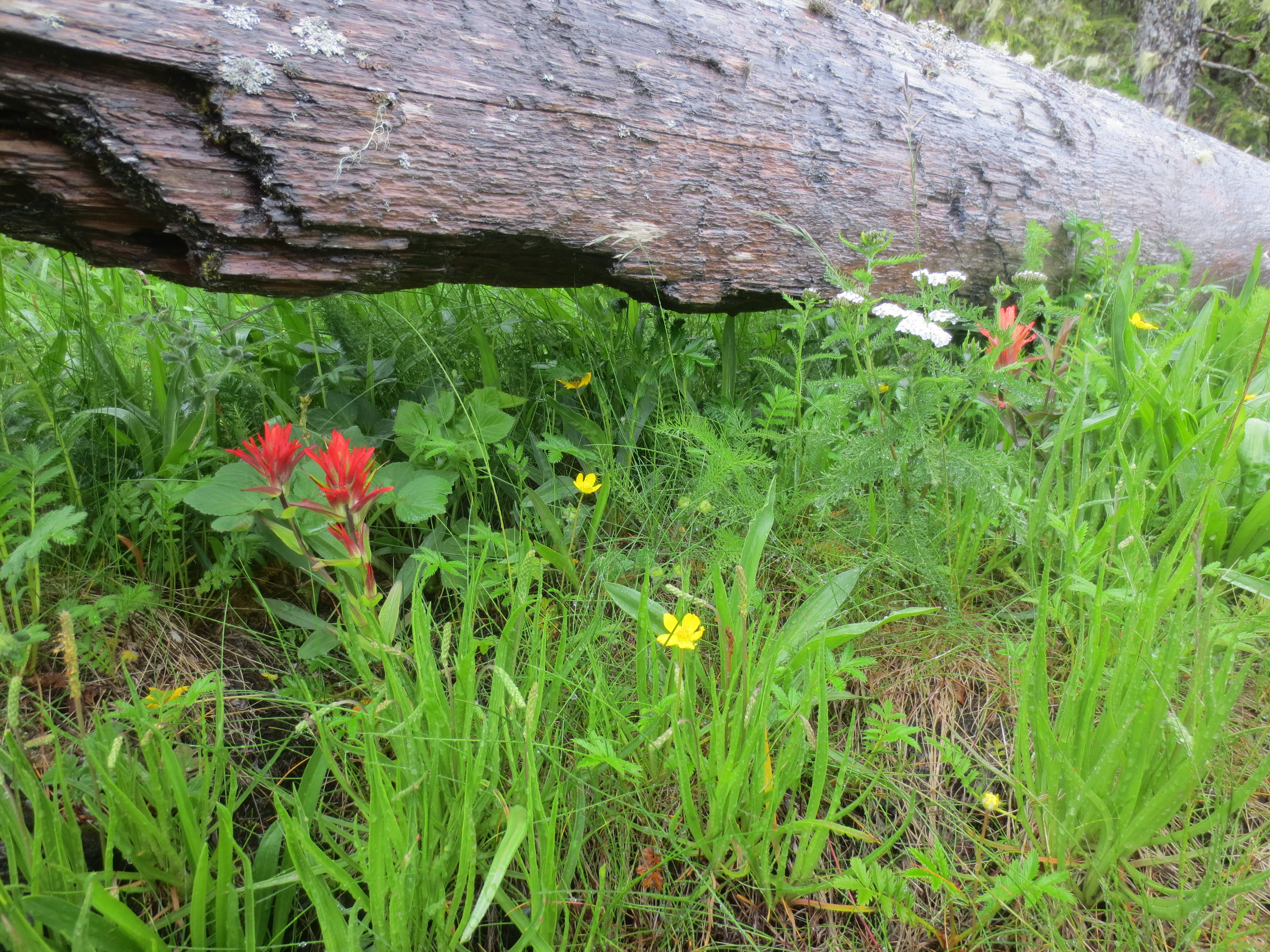
Castilleja miniata var. dixonii in British Columbia

- Castilleja miniata var. dixonii

Initially described as Castilleja dixonii by Merritt Lyndon Fernald in 1899, it was reduced to a variety by Aven Nelson and J.F. Macbride in 1918. It is found on the west coast in British Columbia, Washington, and Oregon.

- Castilleja miniata var. fulva

Francis Whittier Pennell described it as Castilleja fulva in 1934 and as a variety by John Mark Egger in 2008. It grows in Alberta, British Columbia, and the Yukon Territory.

- Castilleja miniata var. miniata

The autonymic variety is widespread and from Alaska to Baja California and eastward to the Rocky Mountain states and Ontario.

- Castilleja miniata var. oblongifolia

This variety was inititally described as Castilleja oblongifolia by Asa Gray and as a variety by Philip Alexander Munz in 1932. It grows from south central California to northern Baja California.

Castilleja miniata has 19 synonyms of the species or one of its four varieties.

Table of Synonyms
Name	Year	Rank	Synonym of:	Notes
Castilleja confusa var. pubens (A.Nelson & J.F.Macbr.) A.Nelson & J.F.Macbr.	1916	variety	var. miniata	= het.
Castilleja crispula Piper	1906	species	var. miniata	= het.
Castilleja dixonii Fernald	1899	species	var. dixonii	≡ hom.
Castilleja fulva Pennell	1934	species	var. fulva	≡ hom.
Castilleja hyetophila Pennell	1934	species	var. miniata	= het.
Castilleja hyetophila f. longiflora Pennell	1934	form	var. miniata	= het.
Castilleja inconstans Standl.	1909	species	var. miniata	= het.
Castilleja miniata var. crispula (Piper) A.Nelson & J.F.Macbr.	1916	variety	var. miniata	= het.
Castilleja miniata subsp. dixonii (Fernald) Kartesz	1999	subspecies	var. dixonii	≡ hom.
Castilleja montana Congdon	1900	species	var. miniata	= het.
Castilleja oblongifolia A.Gray	1878	species	var. oblongifolia	≡ hom.
Castilleja pallida var. miniata (Douglas ex Hook.) A.Gray	1862	variety	C. miniata	≡ hom.
Castilleja rhexiifolia var. pubens A.Nelson & J.F.Macbr.	1913	variety	var. miniata	= het.
Castilleja trinervis Rydb.	1901	species	var. miniata	= het.
Castilleja tweedyi Rydb.	1900	species	var. miniata	= het.
Castilleja variabilis Rydb.	1907	species	var. miniata	= het.
Castilleja vreelandii Rydb.	1907	species	var. miniata	= het.
Castilleja confusa Greene	1901	species	var. miniata	= het.
Euchroma integrifolia Nutt. ex Benth.	1846	species	var. miniata	= het.
Notes: ≡ homotypic synonym; = heterotypic synonym

=== Names ===
The scientific name, miniata, means "cinnabar-red" in Botanical Latin, the bright scarlet color of its bracts. It is likewise known by the common name scarlet paintbrush, however other species are also known by this name at times including Castilleja indivisa and Castilleja coccinea. (See: scarlet paintbrush for additional species) Like Castilleja coccinea, it is also occasionally called red paintbrush. It is more specifically known as the giant red paintbrush, great red paintbrush, common red paintbrush, and common paintbrush. It is sometimes called simply a painted cup.
