= Kelly Butte =

Kelly Butte may refer to:

- Kelly Butte, part of Kelly Butte Natural Area in Portland, Oregon
- Kelly Butte (Springfield, Oregon)
- Kelly Butte (Washington), a summit in King County, Washington
