= Scarlet paintbrush =

Scarlet paintbrush or scarlet Indian paintbrush is a common name for several flowering plants and may refer to:

- Castilleja coccinea, eastern North America
- Castilleja indivisa, south-central United States
- Castilleja integra, southwestern United States and northern Mexico
- Castilleja miniata, native to western North America
