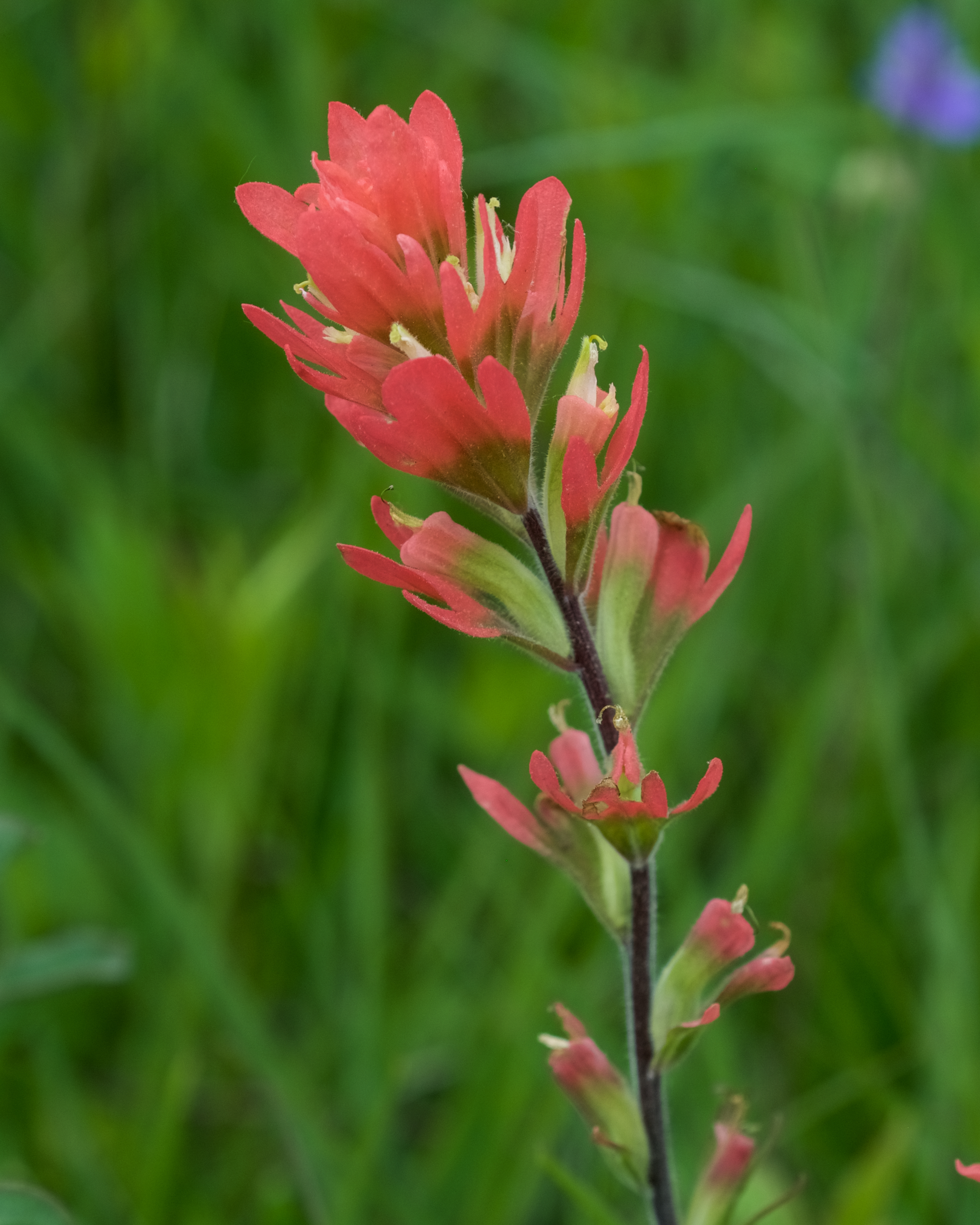
- Castilleja coccinea

Conservation status
- Secure (NatureServe)

Scientific classification
- Kingdom: Plantae
- Clade: Tracheophytes
- Clade: Angiosperms
- Clade: Eudicots
- Clade: Asterids
- Order: Lamiales
- Family: Orobanchaceae
- Genus: Castilleja
- Species: C. coccinea

Binomial name
- Castilleja coccinea (L.) Spreng.

= Castilleja coccinea =

Plant species in the broomrape family

Castilleja coccinea, commonly known as scarlet paintbrush or scarlet painted-cup, is a biennial flowering plant in the Orobanchaceae (broomrape) family. It is usually found in prairies, rocky glades, moist and open woodlands, thickets, and along streams in central and eastern North America.

== Description ==
It is an upright, hairy, 1-to-7-decimeter (3.9 to 27.6 in) tall hemiparasitic plant. In its first year, the plant appears as a basal rosette, and in the second year the stem, usually unbranched, rises from the rosette. The basal leaves are oblong and mostly entire, and usually die before the flowers appear. The alternate stem leaves are deeply and irregularly lobed and measure up to 8 cm (3 in) long. The common names for this plant reflect the showy red bracts, inside of which is the actual greenish-yellow corolla ("flower").

Castilleja coccinea can be distinguished from other Castilleja of the southeastern US because it has a 2-to-3.5-millimeter (0.08 to 0.14 in) long, thin yellowish or orangish lip on the corolla, the inflorescence bracts are deeply lobed, and the basal rosettes of leaves are usually well-developed.

== Etymology ==
The genus name Castilleja is from the 18th-century Spanish botanist, Domingo Castillejo. The specific epithet coccinea is Latin for 'red'. It is similarly known by the common name scarlet paintbrush or scarlet Indian paintbrush, however other species such as Castilleja miniata are also known as this. (See: scarlet paintbrush for additional species) Like Castilleja miniata, it is occasionally known as red paintbrush. It is also simply called painted-cup. Regional names for the species include bloody warrior and bloody noses in Minnesota, election posies and wickackee in Massachusetts, fire pink and prairie-fire in Wisconsin, and nosebleed in Connecticut. It is also called wickaawee and wickawee, which is speculated to derive from an Algonquian word.

== Distribution and habitat ==
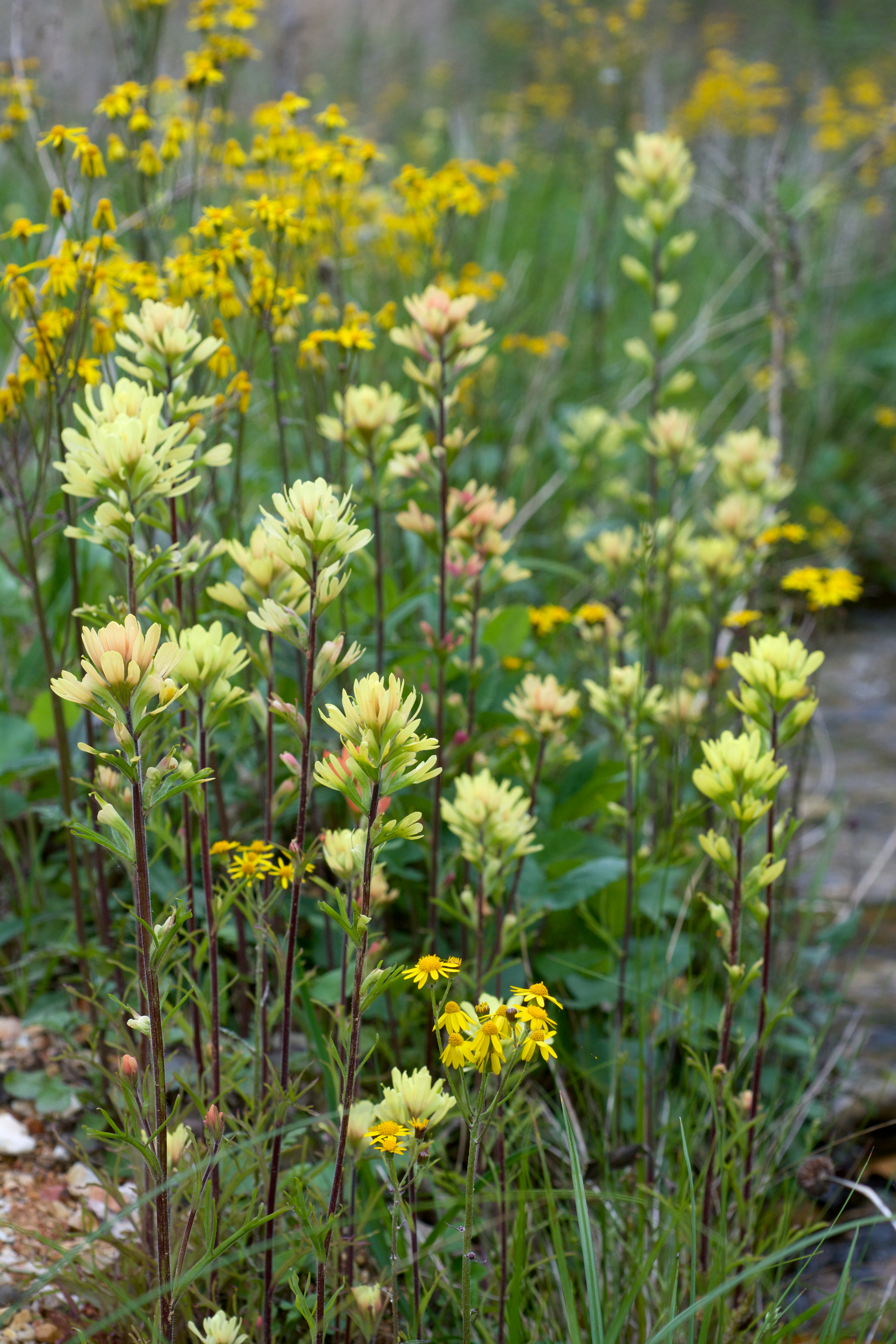
Yellow color form in the Ozarks of Arkansas

C. coccinea is native throughout the central and eastern United States, from Oklahoma to the west, Florida to the south, Maine to the east, and the Canadian border to the north. It is listed as endangered in New York, Connecticut, and Maryland, It is critically imperiled in New Jersey, West Virginia, Kentucky, Georgia, Alabama, and Mississippi, presumed extirpated in Maine and new Hampshire, and possibly extirpated in Louisiana, Massachusetts, and Rhode Island. It is native in Canada in Saskatchewan, Manitoba, and Ontario, although it is critically imperiled in Saskatchewan.

It is found in prairies, rocky glades, moist and open woodlands, thickets, and along streams.

== Ecology ==
C. coccinea have color polymorphism, which means that they can be yellow or scarlet in color, and this depends on the availability of pollinators such as bees. When pollinators are present, the scarlet C. coccinea tend to have a higher reproductive output, as they have higher seed and fruit set. On the other hand, the yellow C. coccinea would have a higher reproductive output when pollinators are scarce.

Though it can survive on its own, studies indicate a forty-fold growth increase when its roots parasitize those of another plant for nutrients. It is primarily pollinated by ruby-throated hummingbirds who can transfer the pollen long distances between typically small and scattered populations of this plant.
