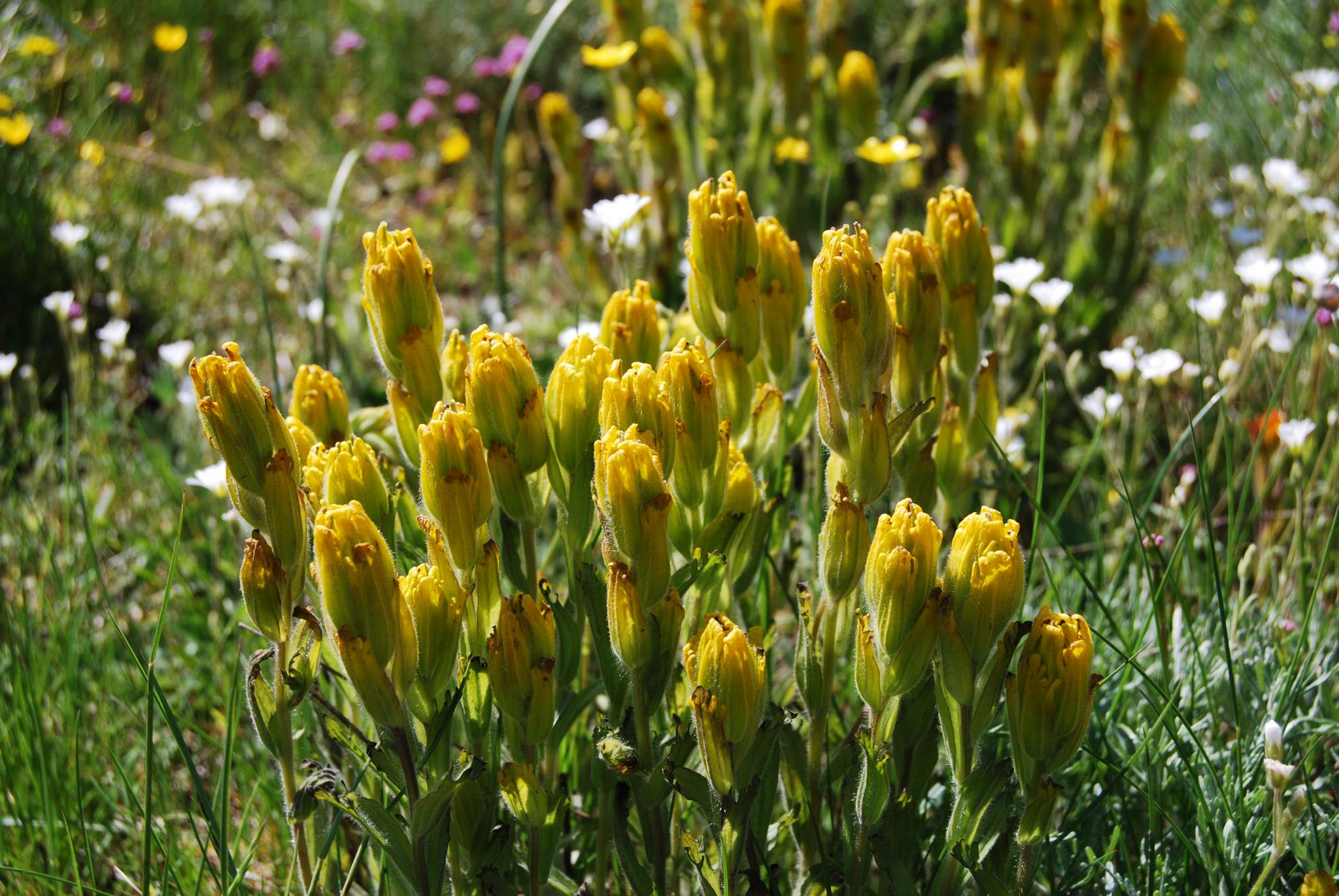

Conservation status
- Imperiled (NatureServe)

Scientific classification
- Kingdom: Plantae
- Clade: Tracheophytes
- Clade: Angiosperms
- Clade: Eudicots
- Clade: Asterids
- Order: Lamiales
- Family: Orobanchaceae
- Genus: Castilleja
- Species: C. levisecta

Binomial name
- Castilleja levisecta Greenm.

= Castilleja levisecta =

Species of flowering plant

Castilleja levisecta is a rare species of flowering plant in the family Orobanchaceae known by the common name golden paintbrush, or golden Indian paintbrush, listed under the Endangered Species Act in 1997. It is native to British Columbia and Washington, where it is known from eleven remaining populations. It occurred in Oregon but all natural occurrences there have been extirpated. It has been reintroduced to a few areas in Oregon, but it remains to be seen if the plants will survive. The plant is a federally listed endangered species of Canada and was listed as threatened in the United States in 1997. On June 30, 2021, the plant was proposed for delisting due to recovery. Effective August 18, 2023, the U.S. Fish and Wildlife Service issued a rule removing golden paintbrush from the Federal List of Endangered and Threatened Plants.

== Description ==
Castilleja levisecta (golden paintbrush) was first collected as a modern botanical specimen near Mill Plain, Washington, by Thomas Jefferson Howell in 1880 and was described by Jesse More Greenman in 1898 (Greenman 1898). This is a perennial herb growing in clumps of up to fifteen stems. The leaves are green, containing chlorophyll to undergo photosynthesis, but like other Castilleja it is a hemiparasite, capable of tapping the roots of other plants via haustorial connections to obtain nutrients and water.

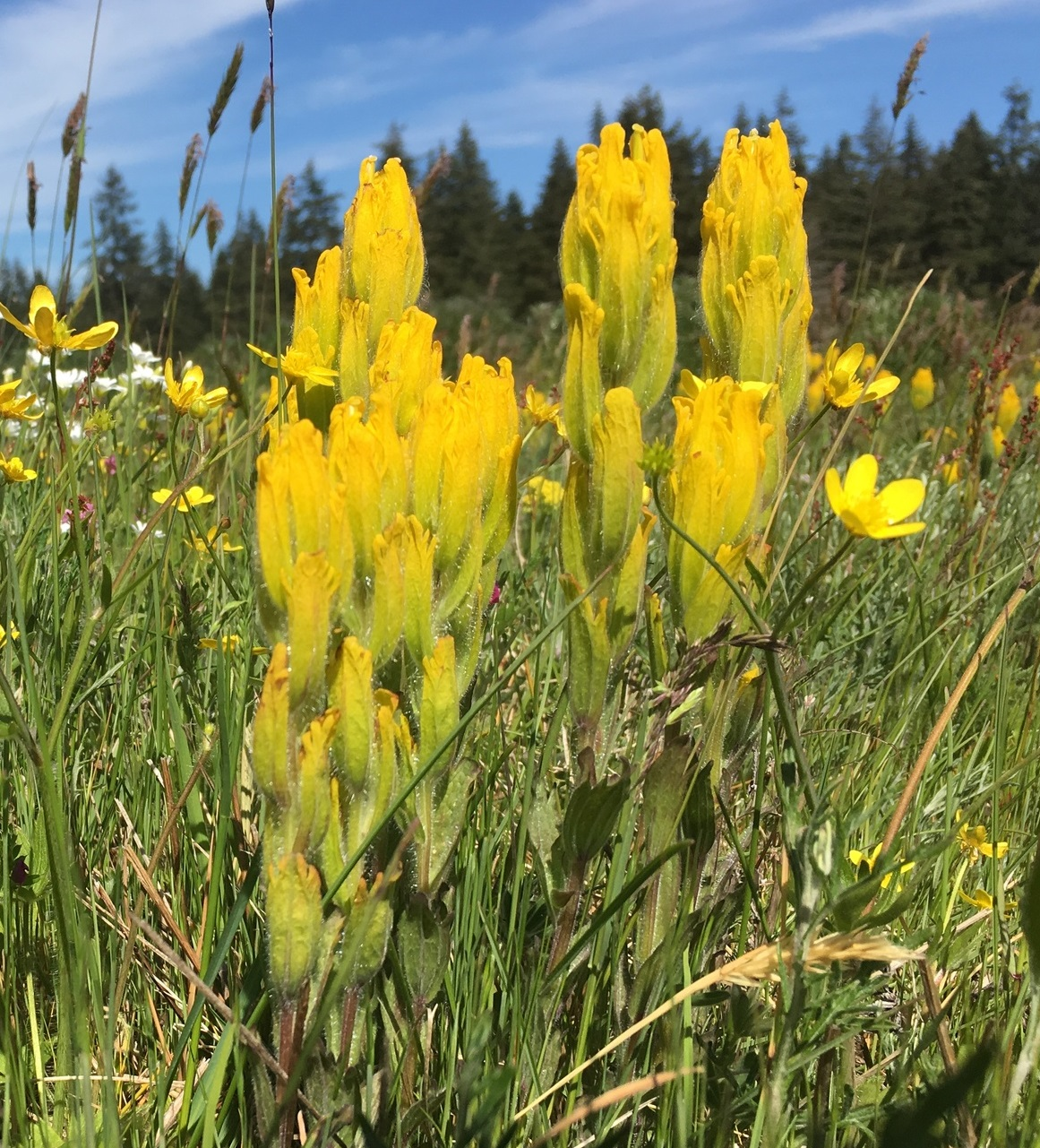
Bright yellow bracts of Castilleja levisecta are more tightly pressed against the stem than bracts of many other Castilleja species

The inflorescence contains bright golden yellow bracts with small green flowers tucked between them. It is the only Castilleja with yellow bracts within its range in the Pacific Northwest. The plant is thought to be pollinated by bumblebees, including Bombus californicus. The species is nearly self-incompatible, and a plant produces many more seeds when crossed with a less closely related individual, such as a plant from a separate population. It is known to hybridize and produce viable seed with Castilleja hispida (harsh paintbrush) in laboratory and experimental grassland settings.

Golden paintbrush grows in prairie habitat at low elevations, generally in soils of gravelly, glacier-carved sediment. It often occurs alongside Idaho fescue (Festuca idahoensis) and red fescue (F. rubra), and it is a member of the Garry Oak ecosystem. The remaining Canadian occurrences of the species are on Trial Island and Alpha Islet off of Vancouver Island. There are nine populations in Washington in maritime grasslands and bluffs around the Puget Sound. Most of these are on islands, including several on Whidbey Island and one on San Juan Island.

The species is diploid and has very high genetic diversity for a rare plant, a condition that makes it less likely to experience rapid extinction. Conservation efforts are underway, especially attempts to increase populations by introducing and reintroducing plants to appropriate habitat, and carefully augmenting extant populations by planting more individuals. The plant has been reintroduced to its former range in the Willamette Valley in Oregon. These populations will be monitored for the long term, hopefully over twenty years, to assess their health and status.

== Ecology and conservation ==
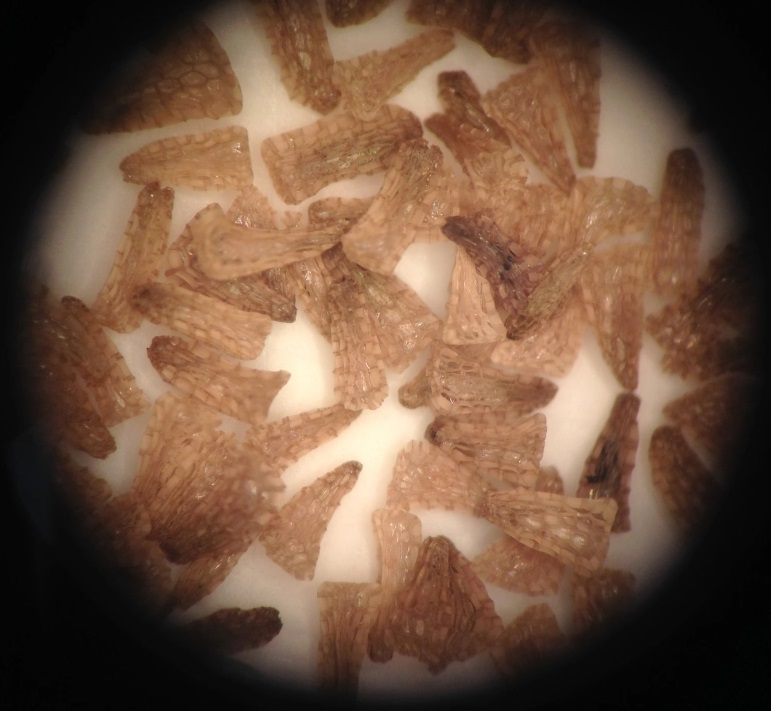
Seeds of putative Castilleja levisecta × Castilleja hispida hybrid

Golden paintbrush plays an important role in grassland community dynamics and multitrophic interactions. For example, its hemiparasitic reliance on other plant species in its habitat is thought to affect competition and dominance among other plant species in its community. Additionally, its foliage naturally contains defensive compounds called iridoid glycosides that are sequestered in the tissues of the endangered Taylor's checkerspot butterfly larvae, which have developed a tolerance for these compounds and are able to consume golden paintbrush foliage. These sequestered iridoid glycosides then confer chemical protection against bird predators to the butterfly larvae.

The grassland habitats in which golden paintbrush grows have traditionally undergone periodic wildfires, and the golden paintbrush appears to thrive in this fire regime, possibly because fires clear out taller vegetation that would otherwise compete with it, or provide it nutrients in the ash. Fire frequency may also have effects on golden paintbrush's defensive phytochemistry.

If the paintbrush is fire-adapted, it would experience negative effects from fire suppression efforts. Other threats to the species include habitat destruction during residential or other development, and encroachment from introduced plant species such as mouse-ear hawkweed (Hieracium pilosella), Scotch broom (Cytisus scoparius), and oxeye daisy (Leucanthemum vulgare). Plants experience herbivory by wild animals, trampling by hikers, and losses when they are picked by wildflower enthusiasts.

The hybridization potential between golden and harsh paintbrush has been identified as a threat to the genetic integrity of golden paintbrush, requiring land managers to develop strategies for balancing the ecological needs of these two Castilleja species and endangered insects that rely on them.
