= Kelly Butte (Washington) =

Mountain in Washington (state), United States

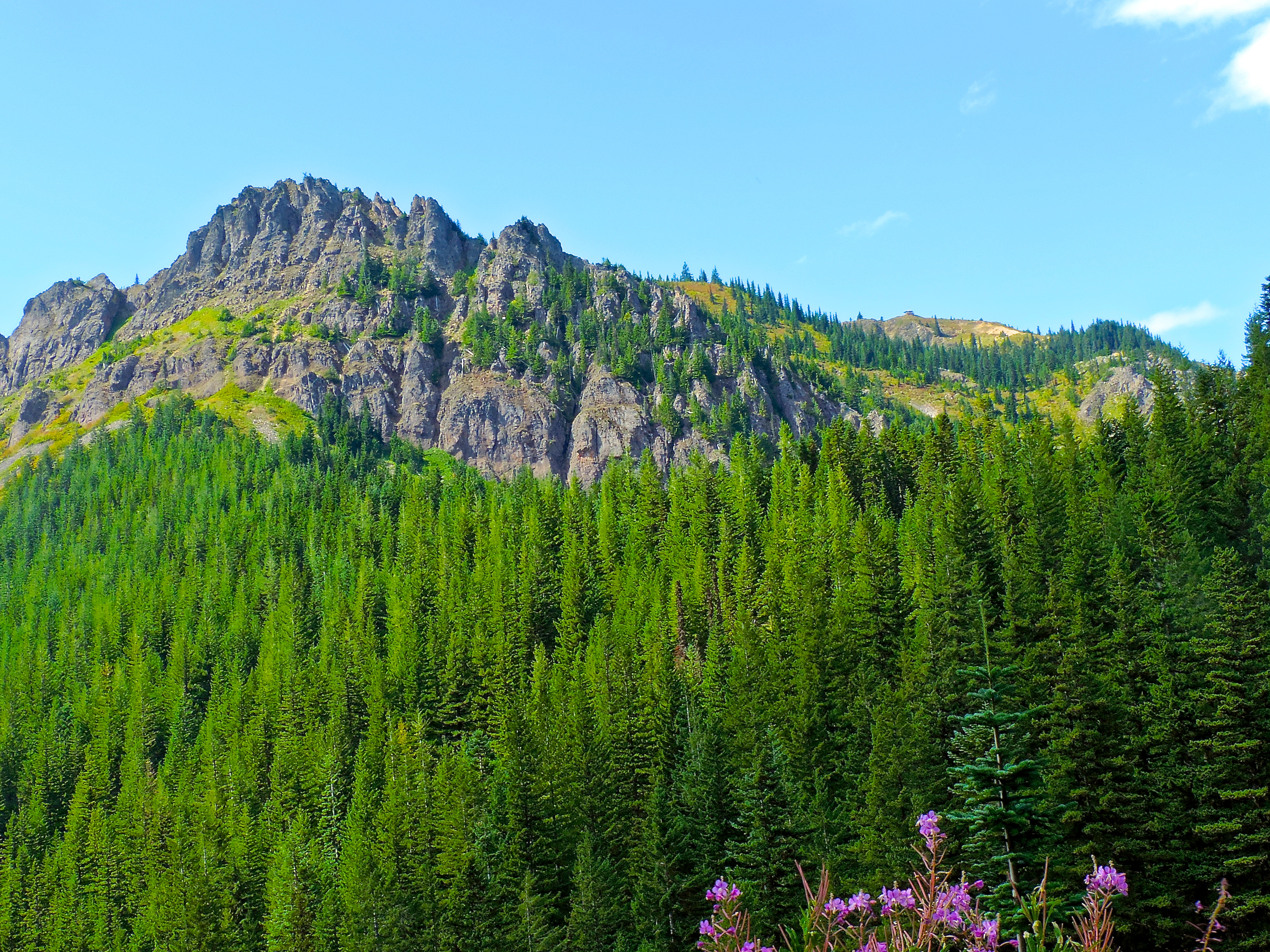
- Southeast aspect, summit to the right

Highest point
- Elevation: 5,417 ft (1,651 m)
- Prominence: 1,280 ft (390 m)
- Isolation: 4.04 mi (6.50 km)
- Coordinates: 47°10′09″N 121°29′25″W

Geography
- Location within Washington (state) Location within the United States
- Location: King County, Washington, U.S.
- Parent range: Cascade Range
- Topo map: USGS Lester

Geology
- Rock age: Miocene
- Mountain type: Volcanic plug
- Rock type: Andesite

Climbing
- Easiest route: hiking trail

Kelly Butte is a 5,417-foot-elevation (1,651-meter) summit located in the southeast corner of King County in Washington state. It is set on land managed by Mount Baker-Snoqualmie National Forest, and situated 3.1 mi (5.0 km) northwest of Colquhoun Peak and five miles west of the crest of the Cascade Range. Precipitation runoff from Kelly Butte drains into tributaries of the Green River. Topographic relief is significant as the west aspect rises 3,000 feet (910 meters) above Rock Creek in one mile. Access is via the 1.7-mile Kelly Butte Trail which leads to a restored, historical fire lookout tower originally constructed in 1926 and occupying the summit. Flora along the trail includes lilies, bear grass, Indian paintbrush, penstemon, arnica, columbine, lupine, phlox, and huckleberry. This geographical feature's name has been officially adopted by the U.S. Board on Geographic Names.

== Climate ==
Kelly Butte is located in the marine west coast climate zone of western North America. Most weather fronts originate in the Pacific Ocean, and travel east toward the Cascade Mountains. As fronts approach, they are forced upward by the peaks of the Cascade Range (Orographic lift), causing them to drop their moisture in the form of rain or snowfall onto the Cascades. As a result, the west side of the Cascades experiences high precipitation, especially during the winter months in the form of snowfall. During winter months, weather is usually cloudy, but due to high pressure systems over the Pacific Ocean that intensify during summer months, there is often little or no cloud cover during the summer. The months July through October offer the most favorable weather for climbing this mountain.

== Gallery ==
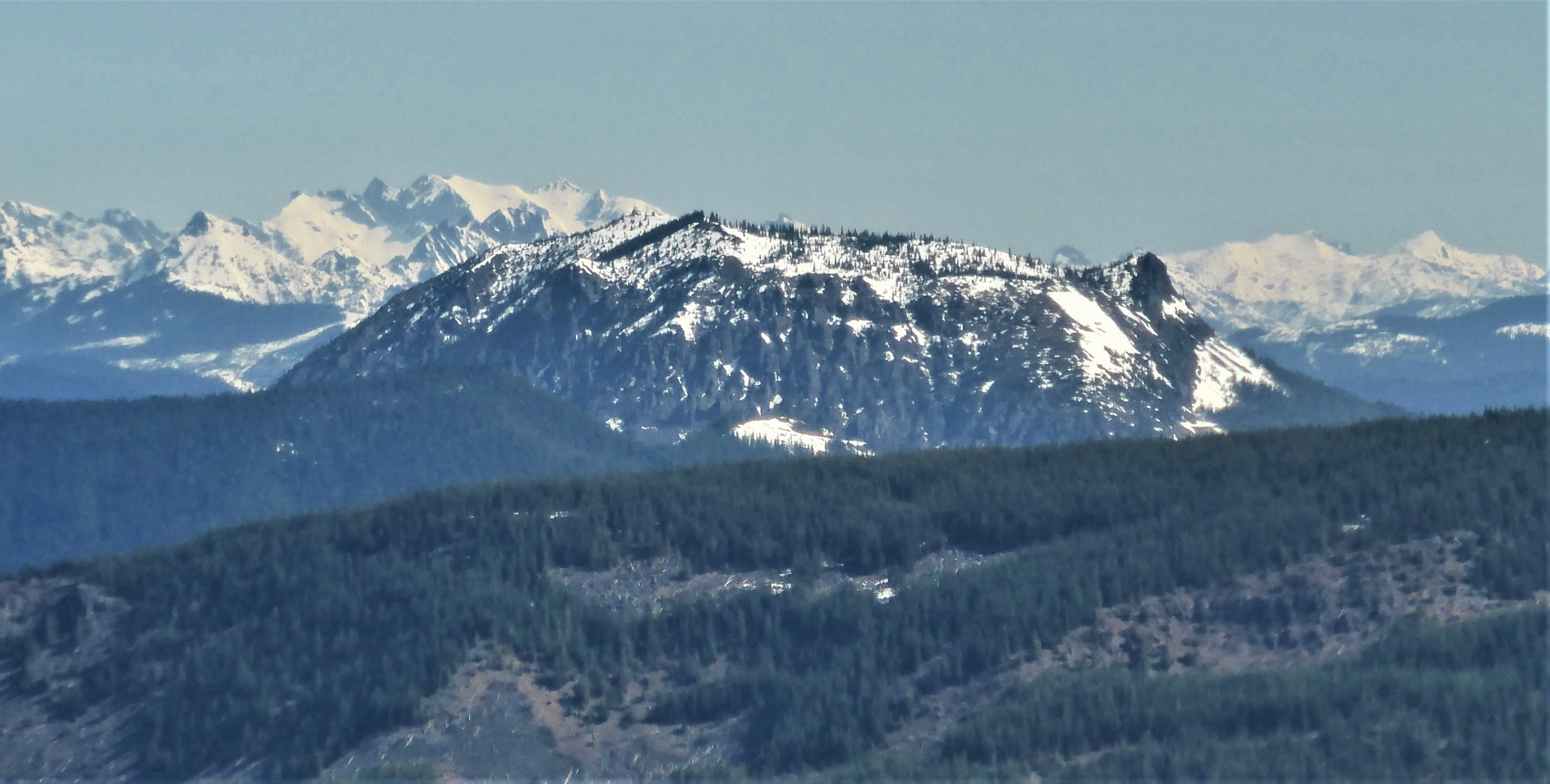
Southwest aspect of Kelly Butte seen from Sun Top

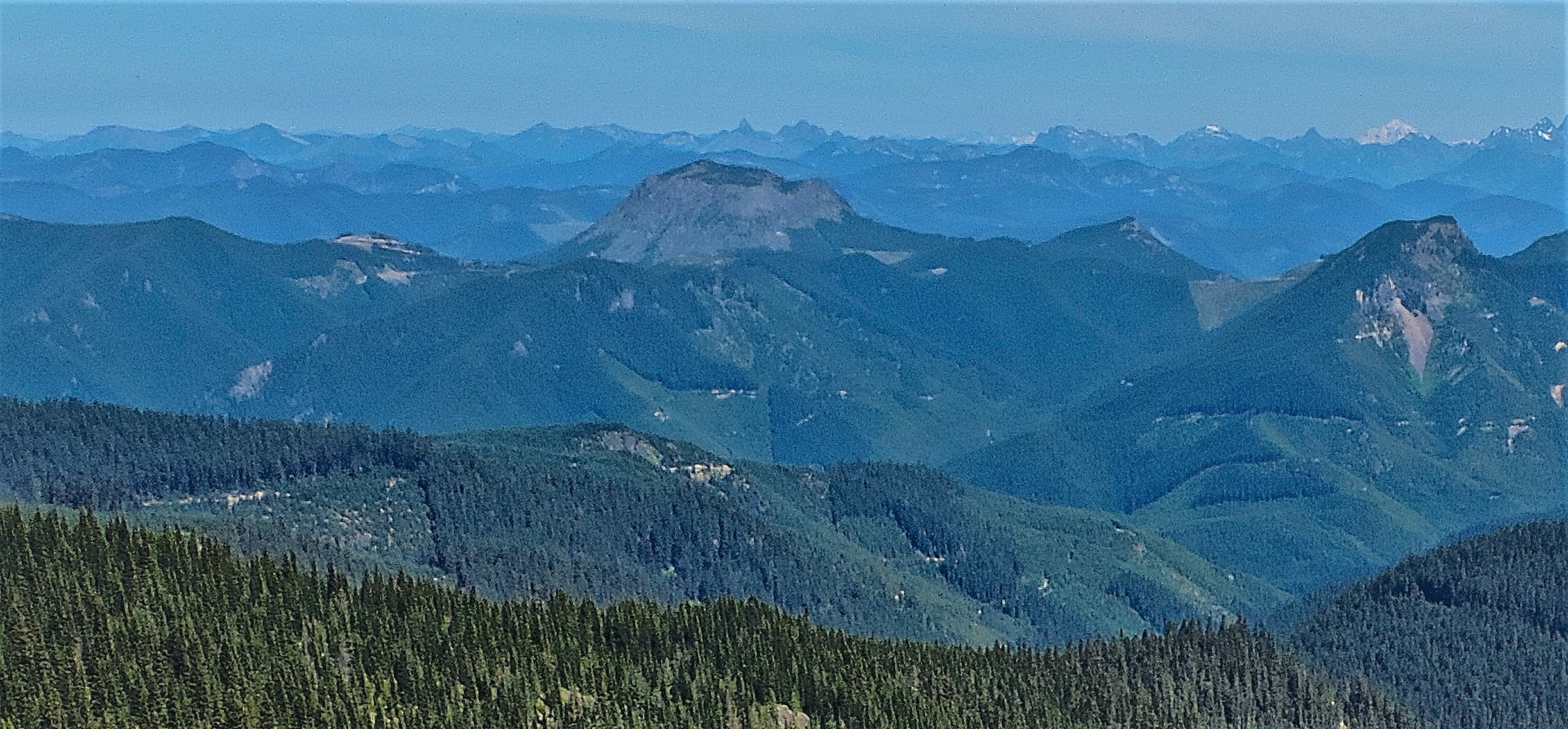
South aspect of Kelly Butte (centered) as seen from Noble Knob,
with Colquhoun Peak to the right

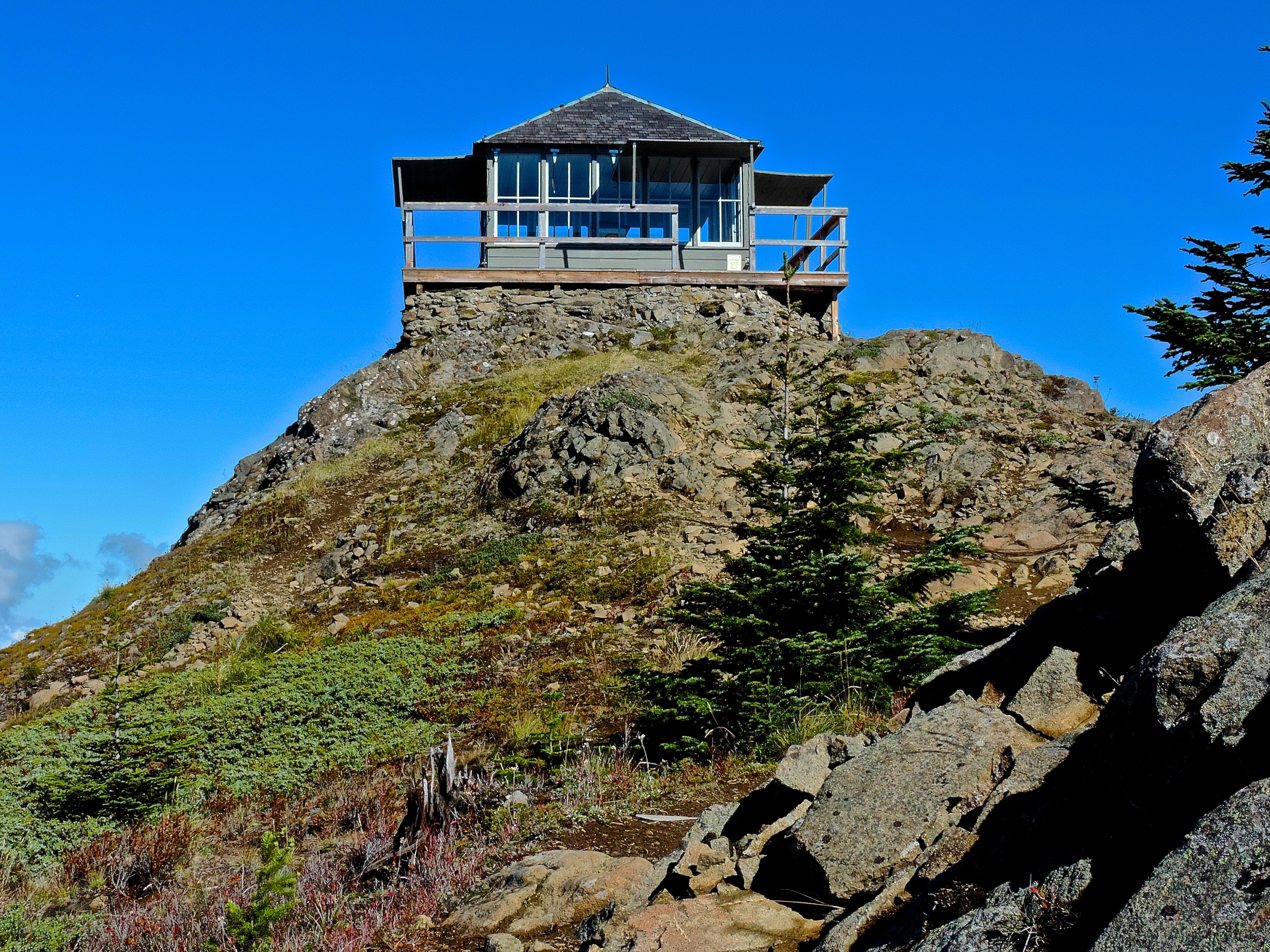
Kelly Butte Lookout

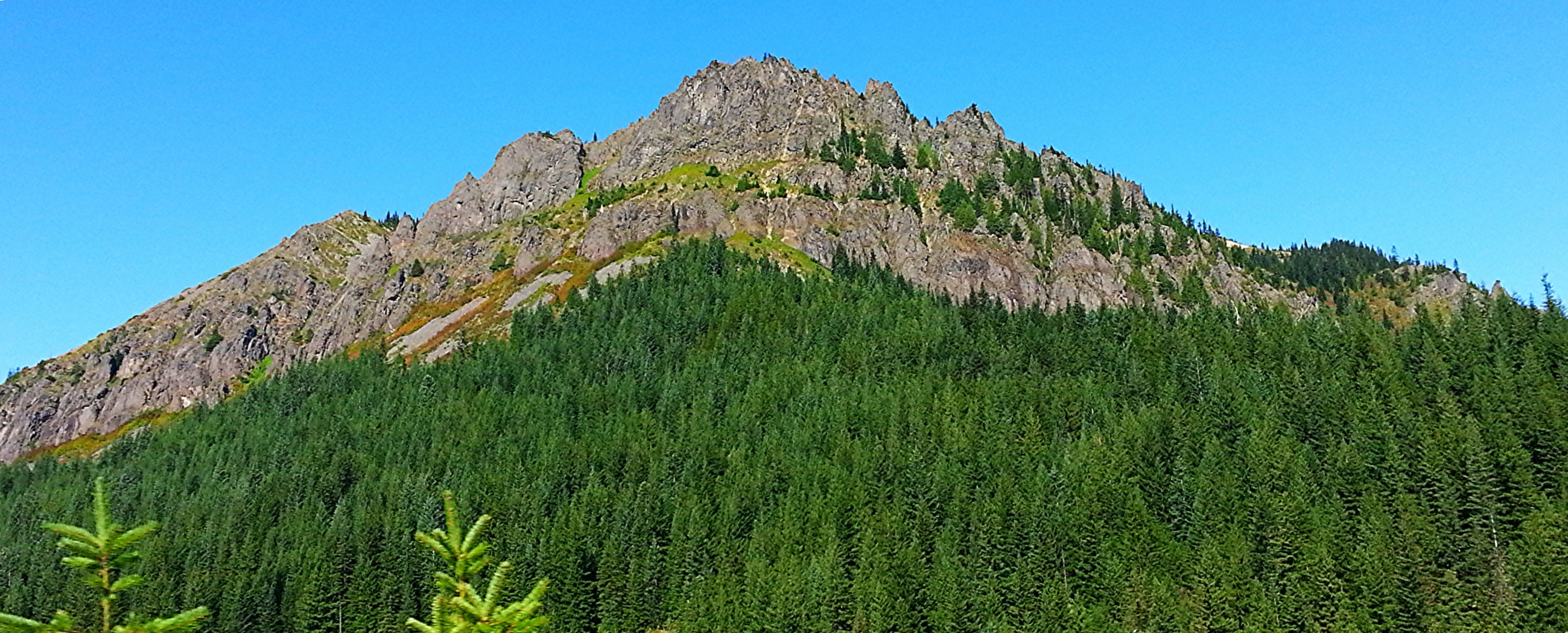
Southeast aspect

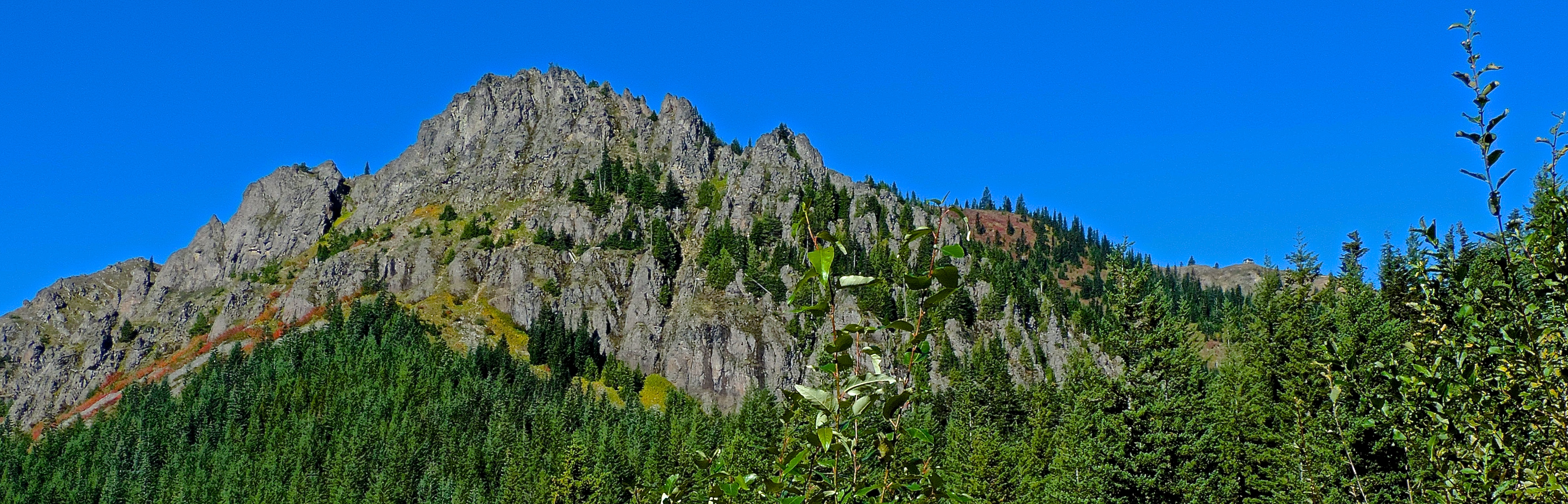
Southeast aspect

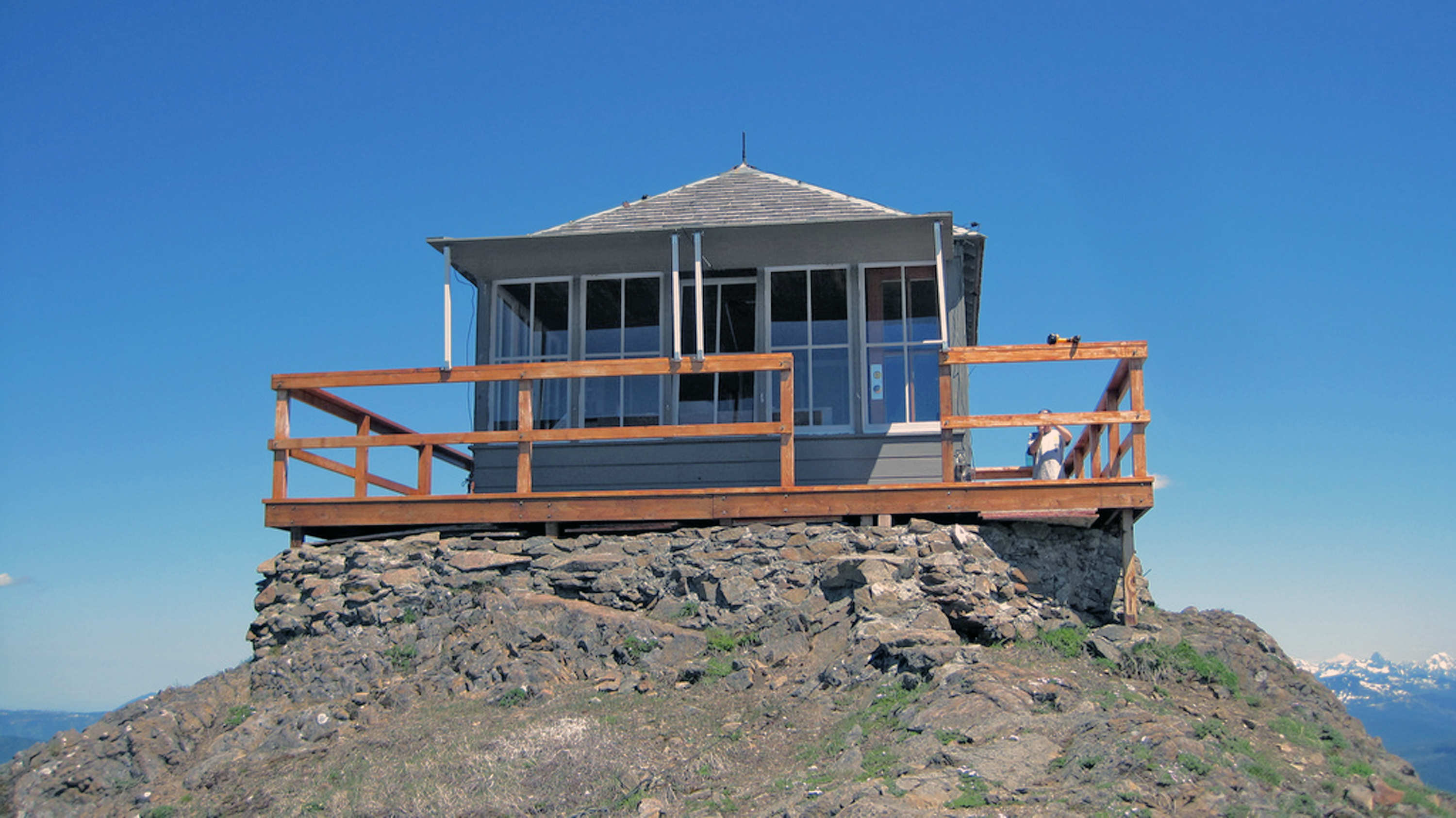
Kelly Butte lookout

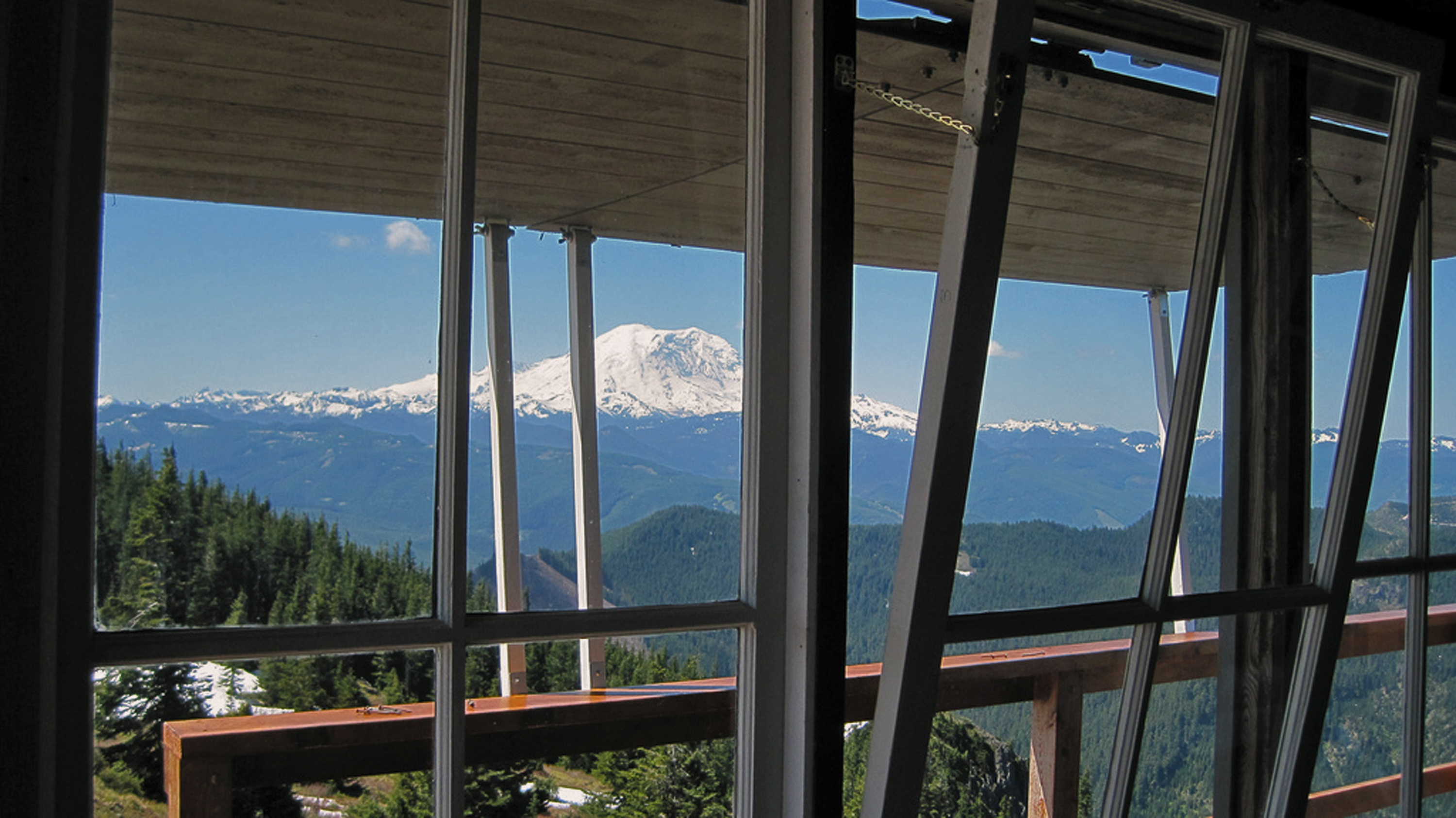
Mount Rainier seen from lookout

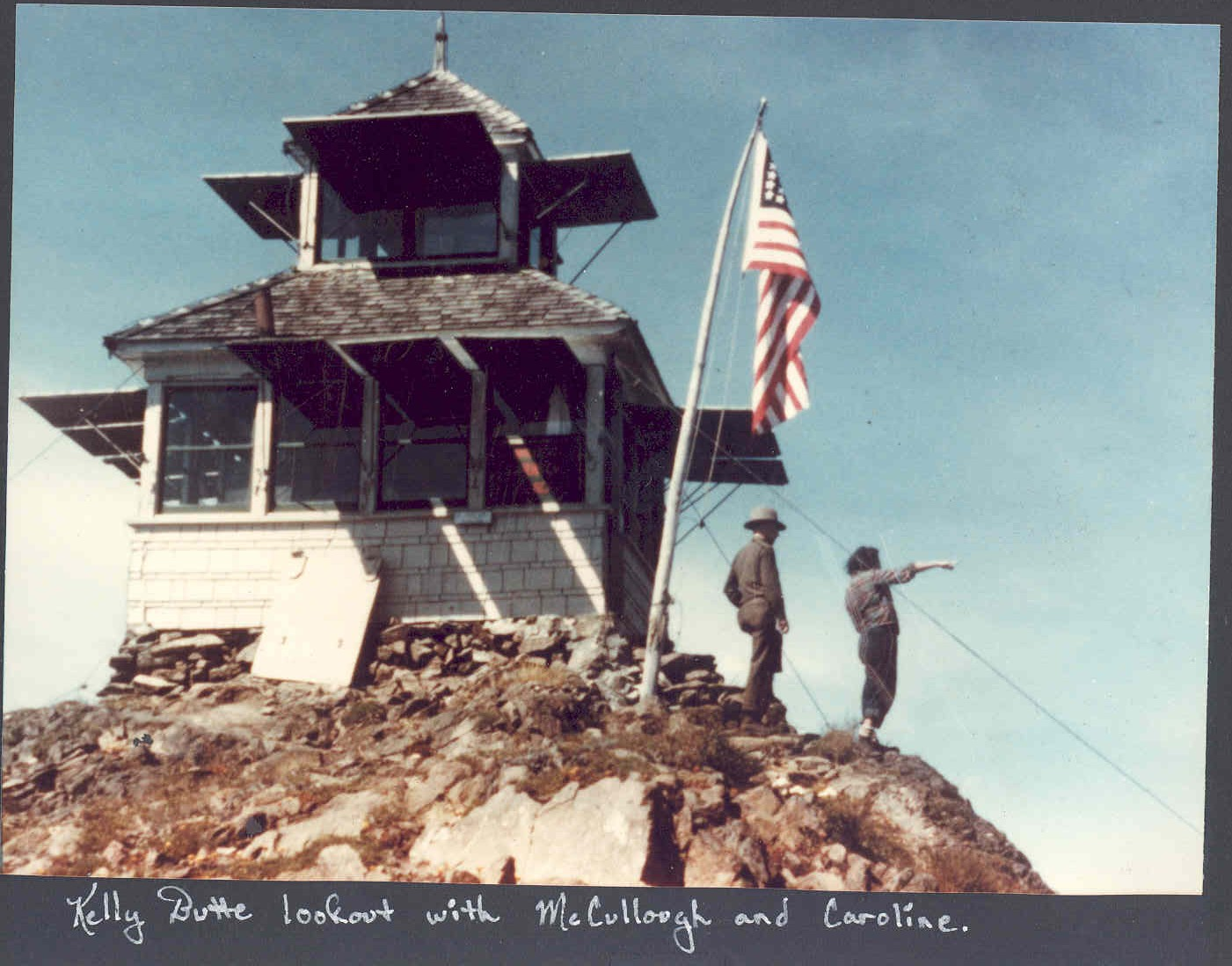
Kelly Butte lookout, original cupola cabin

== See also ==
- Geology of the Pacific Northwest
