= Colquhoun Peak =

Mountain in Washington (state), United States

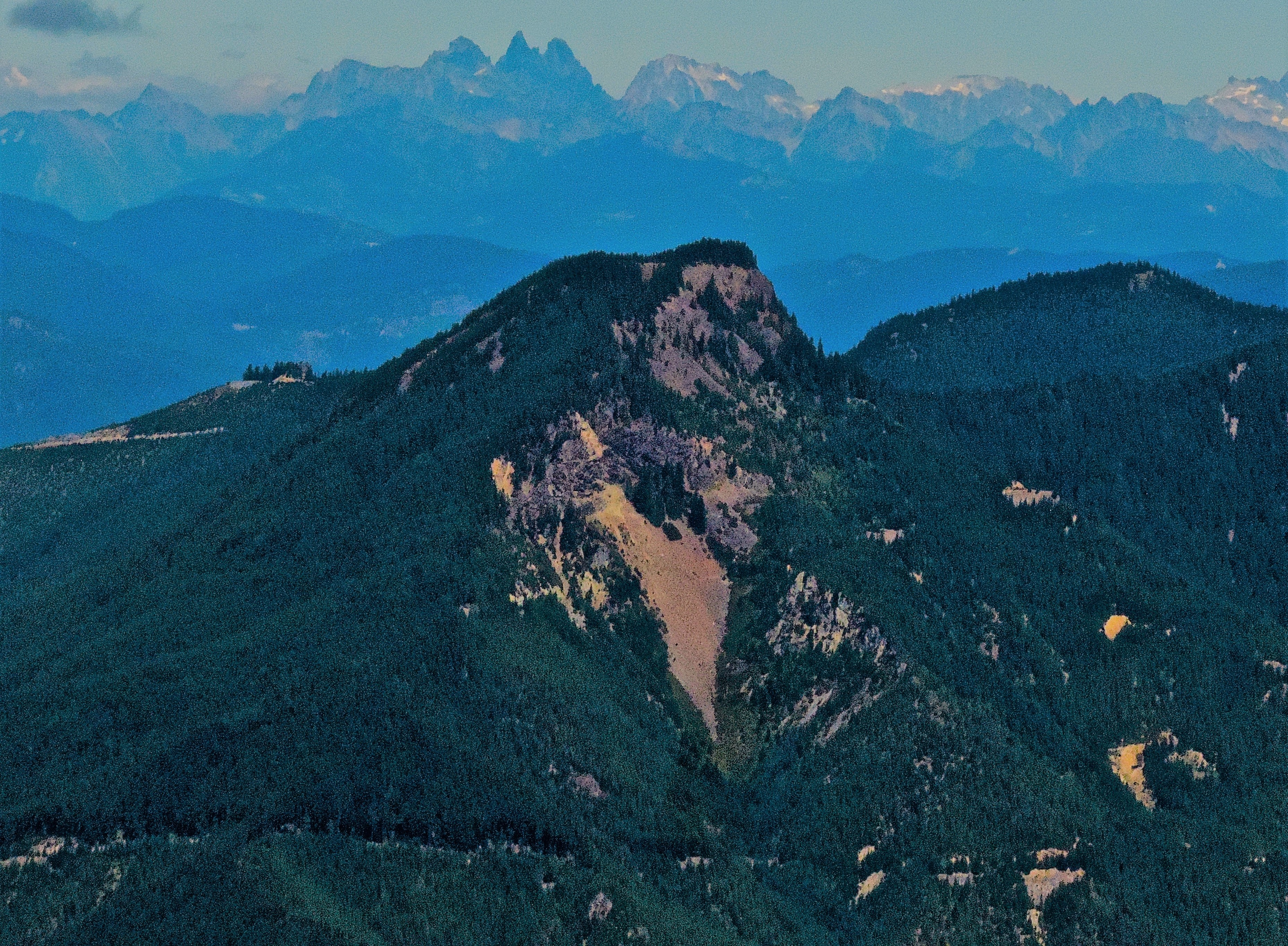
- South aspect

Highest point
- Elevation: 5,173 ft (1,577 m)
- Prominence: 573 ft (175 m)
- Isolation: 1.56 mi (2.51 km)
- Coordinates: 47°07′44″N 121°27′41″W

Geography
- Location within Washington (state) Location within the United States
- Location: King County, Washington, U.S.
- Parent range: Cascades
- Topo map: USGS Lester

Climbing
- Easiest route: hiking trail

Colquhoun Peak is a 5,173-foot-elevation (1,577-meter) mountain summit located in the southeast corner of King County in Washington state. It is set on land managed by Mount Baker-Snoqualmie National Forest. It is situated 3.1 mi (5.0 km) southeast of Kelly Butte and three miles west of the crest of the Cascade Range. Precipitation runoff from Colquhoun Peak drains into tributaries of the Greenwater River. Topographic relief is significant as the summit rises nearly 2,800 feet (850 meters) above the river in 1.5 mile. It once hosted a fire lookout tower.

== History ==
This geographical feature's "Colquhoun Peak" name was officially adopted in 1932 by the U.S. Board on Geographic Names. It has also been known as Colquhoun Mountain and Jacknife Peak. The peak's name was suggested by the White River Recreation Association to honor member Carl Colquhoun who died in 1931 while packing to this peak.

== Climate ==
Colquhoun Peak is located in the marine west coast climate zone of western North America. Most weather fronts originate in the Pacific Ocean, and travel northeast toward the Cascade Mountains. As fronts approach, they are forced upward by the peaks of the Cascade Range (Orographic lift), causing them to drop their moisture in the form of rain or snowfall onto the Cascades. As a result, the west side of the Cascades experiences high precipitation, especially during the winter months in the form of snowfall. During winter months, weather is usually cloudy, but due to high pressure systems over the Pacific Ocean that intensify during summer months, there is often little or no cloud cover during the summer.

== See also ==
- Geology of the Pacific Northwest

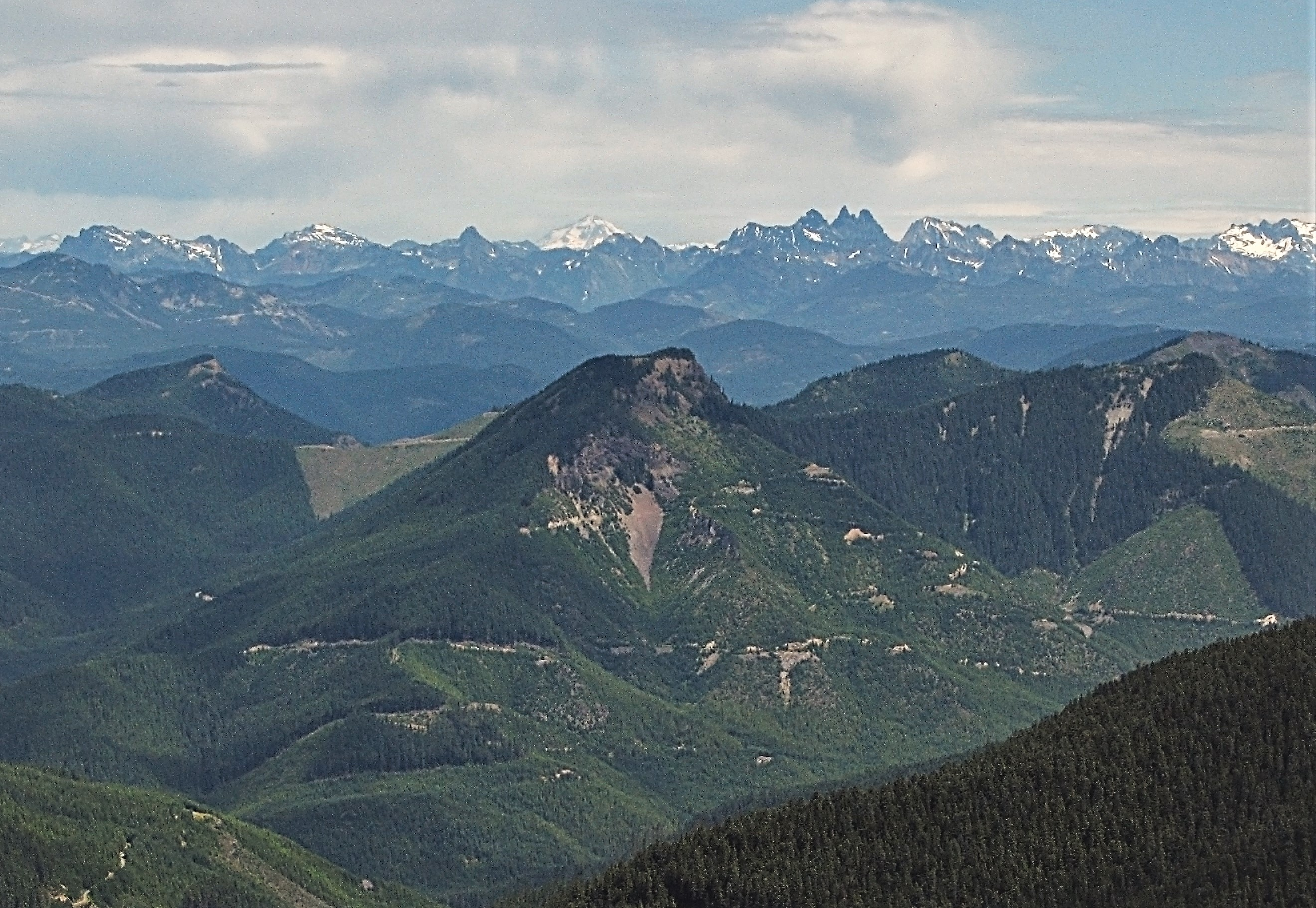
Colquhoun Peak seen from Noble Knob
