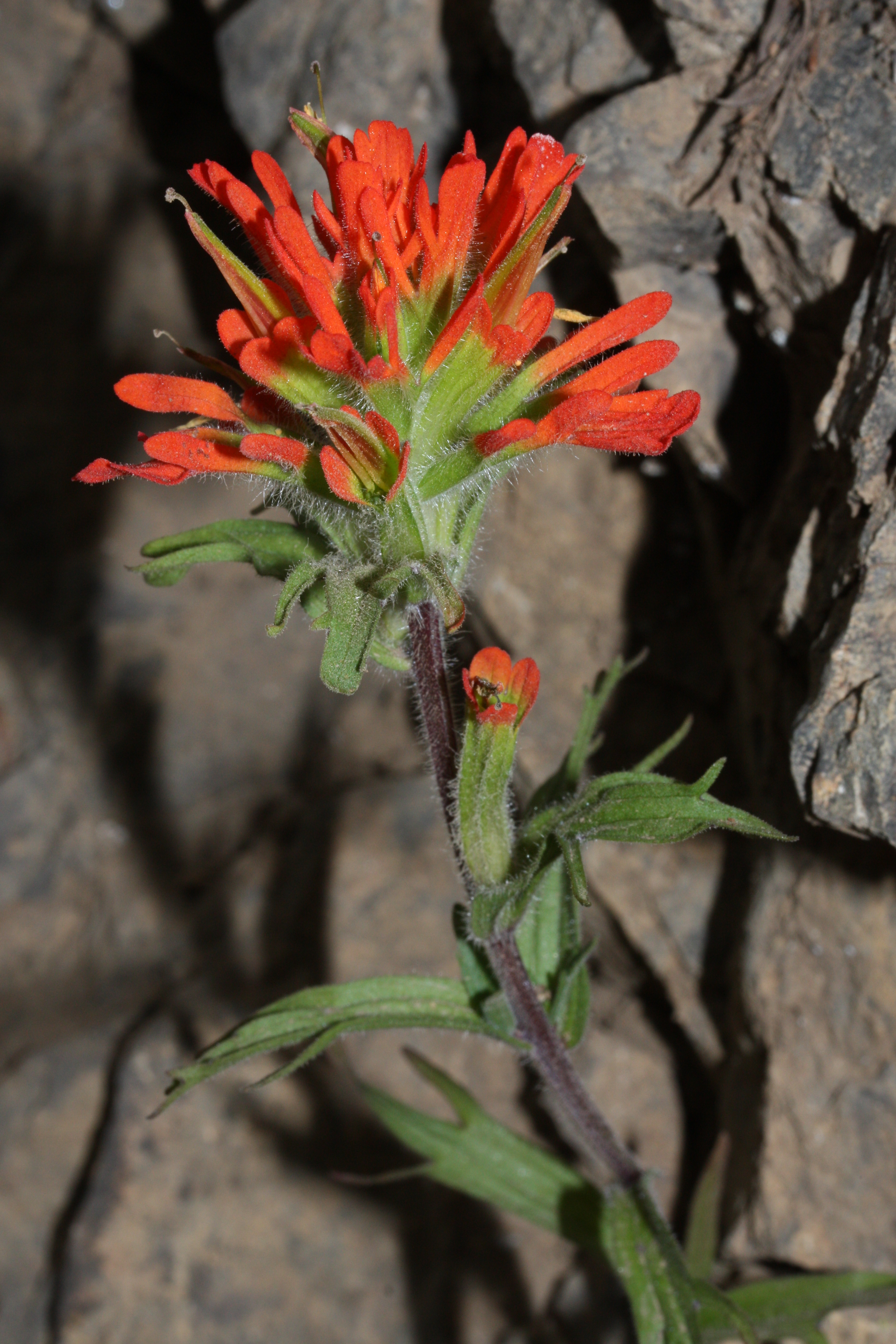

Conservation status
- Secure (NatureServe)

Scientific classification
- Kingdom: Plantae
- Clade: Embryophytes
- Clade: Tracheophytes
- Clade: Angiosperms
- Clade: Eudicots
- Clade: Asterids
- Order: Lamiales
- Family: Orobanchaceae
- Genus: Castilleja
- Species: C. hispida

Binomial name
- Castilleja hispida Benth.

= Castilleja hispida =

Species of flowering plant

Castilleja hispida is a species of flowering plant in the family Orobanchaceae, also known by the common name harsh paintbrush, or harsh Indian paintbrush. It is native to British Columbia, Alberta, Washington, Idaho, Montana, and Oregon.

== Description ==
Castilleja hispida grows at low to middle elevations in open areas, typically on grassy slopes and dry meadows, or at forest edges and openings. It is a perennial herb growing in clumps of several ascending or erect and hairy stems that are usually unbranching and up to 60 cm tall.

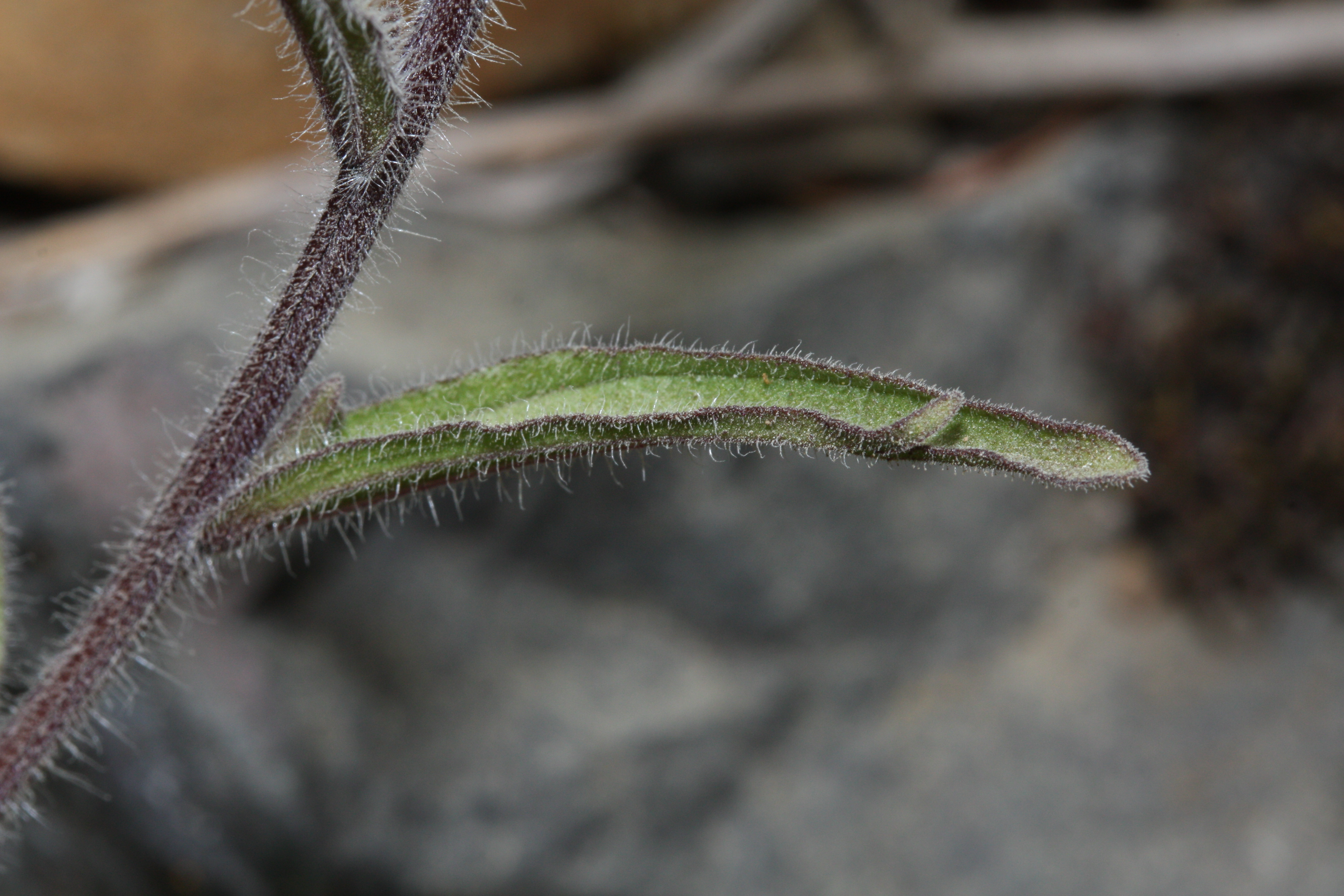
Hairy stem of Castilleja hispida – "hispida" is Latin for hairy

The leaves are green, containing chlorophyll to undergo photosynthesis, but like other Castilleja species it is a hemiparasite, capable of tapping the roots of other plants via haustorial connections to obtain nutrients and water. The inflorescence contains bright orange to red bracts with small green flowers tucked between them. Harsh paintbrush is pollinated by members of the Bombus genus.

Harsh paintbrush populations may be diploid or tetraploid, though diploid populations are more common. This species, especially in its diploid form, is known to hybridize and produce viable seed with the diploid Castilleja levisecta (golden paintbrush) in laboratory and experimental grassland restoration settings. This hybridization potential has been identified as a threat to the genetic integrity of golden paintbrush, which is endangered, requiring land managers to develop strategies for balancing the ecological needs of these two Castilleja species and endangered insects that rely on them.

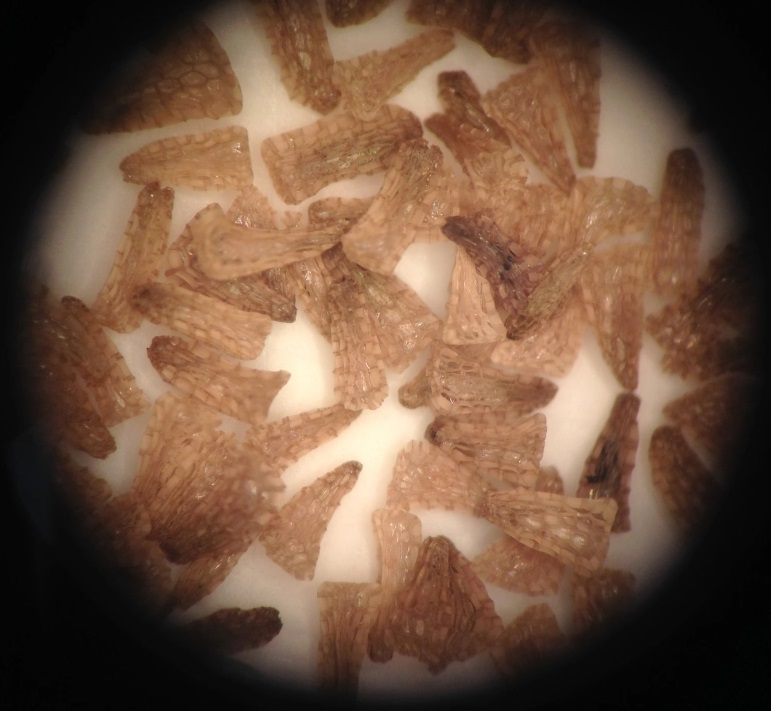
Seeds of putative Castilleja hispida × Castilleja levisecta hybrid

== Ecology ==
Harsh paintbrush plays an important role in grassland multitrophic interactions. For example, its foliage naturally contains defensive compounds called iridoid glycosides that are sequestered in the tissues of the endangered Taylor's checkerspot butterfly larvae, which have developed a tolerance for these compounds and are able to consume golden paintbrush foliage. These sequestered iridoid glycosides then confer chemical protection against bird predators to the butterfly larvae. Harsh paintbrush is also one of the preferred oviposition species for female Taylor's checkerspot butterflies.
