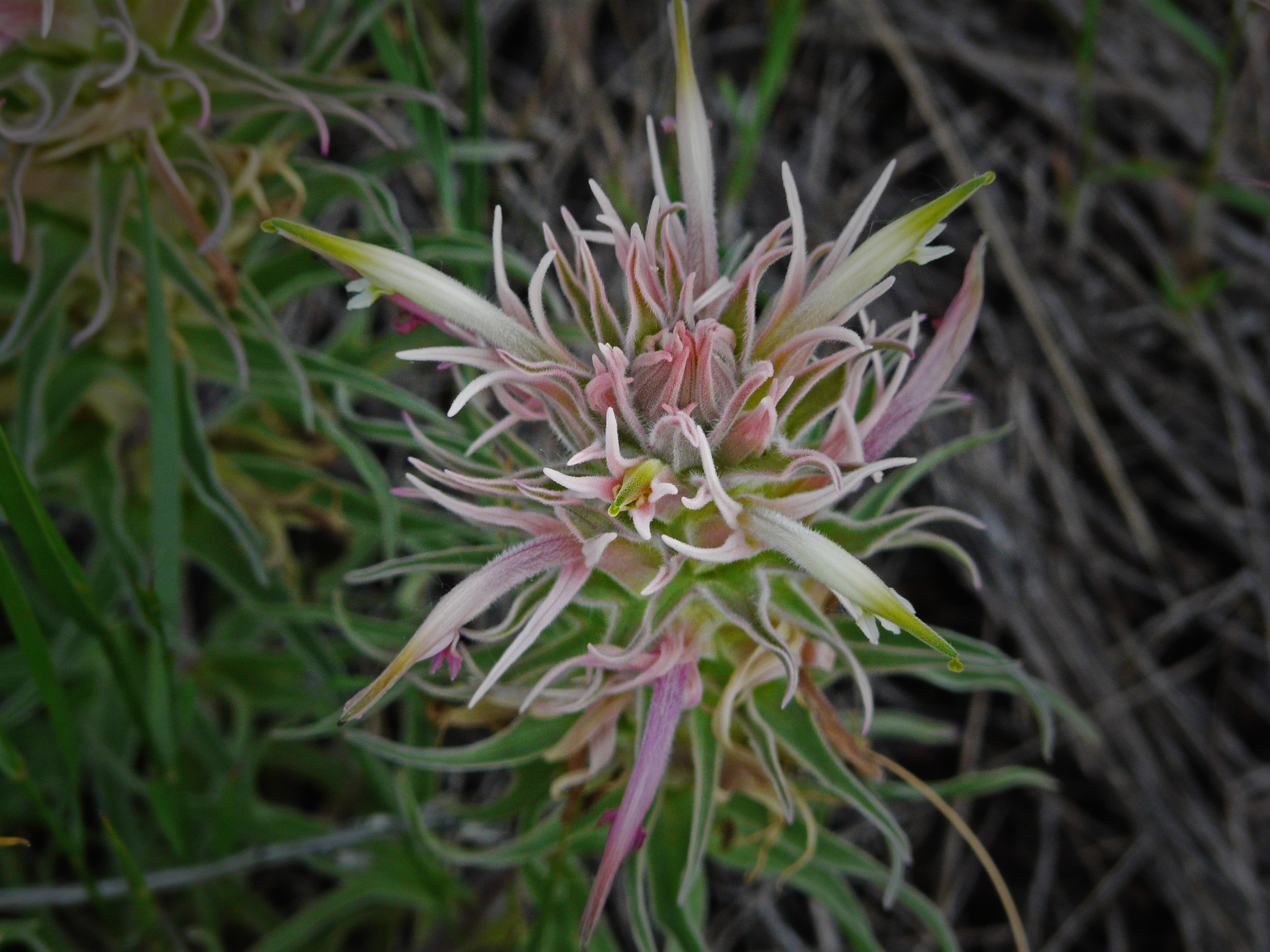

Conservation status
- Secure (NatureServe)

Scientific classification
- Kingdom: Plantae
- Clade: Tracheophytes
- Clade: Angiosperms
- Clade: Eudicots
- Clade: Asterids
- Order: Lamiales
- Family: Orobanchaceae
- Genus: Castilleja
- Species: C. sessiliflora

Binomial name
- Castilleja sessiliflora Pursh

Synonyms
- Bartsia grandiflora; Castilleja grandiflora; Euchroma grandiflora

= Castilleja sessiliflora =

Plant species in the broomrape family

Castilleja sessiliflora is a species of flowering plant in the broomrape family known by the common names downy paintbrush and downy paintedcup. It is native to the Great Plains of North America from southern Canada, through the central United States, to northern Mexico. It occurs as far west as the eastern slopes of the Rocky Mountains.

== Description ==
This perennial herb produces one or more stems 10 to 40 centimeters (4 to 16 in) tall from a woody root crown. It is hemiparasitic, obtaining water and nutrients from other plants by tapping their roots. This Castilleja species has been observed parasitizing eastern redcedar (Juniperus virginiana) and oldfield juniper (J. communis var. depressa). It reproduces sexually and vegetatively by resprouting from its root crown.

The petals are fused and form a curvilinear tube. The sepals are shorter, with narrow lobes. Altogether, the inflorescence is green, yellowish, and pink.

This plant grows in several habitat types, including prairie, shinnery, Texas savanna, and shrubsteppe. It is pollinated by a hawk moth.

There is anecdotal evidence that Castilleja sessiliflora is less dependent on host plants than other members of its genus. The noted wildflower writer Claude A. Barr reported that a specimen was successfully moved by him into a garden where it lived for several years and produced one seedling without an apparent host.

== Taxonomy ==
Castilleja sessiliflora was given its scientific name in 1813 by Frederick Traugott Pursh. It is classified as part of the genus Castilleja within the family Orobanchaceae. It has no accepted subspecies, but has one in its five heterotypic synonyms.

Table of Synonyms
Name	Year	Rank
Bartsia grandiflora Spreng.	1821	species
Castilleja grandiflora (Nutt.) Spreng.	1825	species
Castilleja sessiliflora subsp. betheli Cockerell	1918	subspecies
Castilleja sessiliflora f. purpurina Pennell	1935	form
Euchroma grandiflora Nutt.	1818	species

=== Names ===
The binomial name, Castilleja sessiliflora, is Botanical Latin with the second part meaning its flowers have no stalks. It is known by the common names downy paintedcup, downy paintbrush, and Great Plains paintbrush.
