= Kelly Butte (Springfield, Oregon) =

Hill in west Springfield, Oregon, United States

Coordinates: 44.0533797°N 123.0309724°W

Kelly Butte is a hill in west Springfield, Oregon, United States.

The butte was named for John Kelly, who came to the Oregon Country in 1843 as an employee of the Hudson's Bay Company. A native of County Wexford, Ireland, he had previously lived in Milwaukee, Wisconsin. From Oregon he returned to the United States, served in the Mexican–American War, and returned to Oregon in 1849 as a wagonmaster with the U.S. Mounted Rifles. He worked as a stock trader between Oregon and California, and eventually took a Donation Land Claim near Roseburg, Oregon. He came to Springfield in 1866, where he became a miller and lumber contractor until 1869. He returned to Roseburg, serving in the United States General Land Office for the next 8 years. He worked in Portland as a customs collector from 1876 to 1880, and for a time was a commissioner of the Northern Pacific Railway in Montana.

== Kelly family ==
John Kelly was born in 1818. He married Elizabeth Parker. He was the father of George H. and John F. Kelly, co-owners of the Booth-Kelly Lumber Company.
