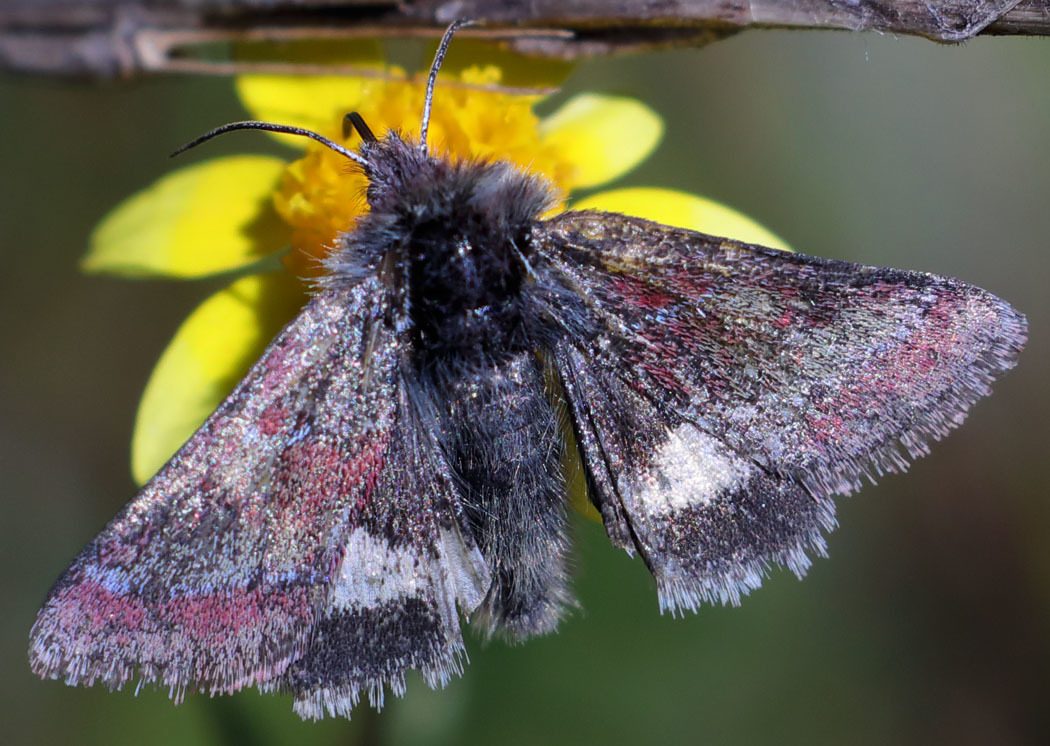

Scientific classification
- Kingdom: Animalia
- Phylum: Arthropoda
- Class: Insecta
- Order: Lepidoptera
- Superfamily: Noctuoidea
- Family: Noctuidae
- Genus: Schinia
- Species: S. pulchripennis

Binomial name
- Schinia pulchripennis Grote, 1874

= Schinia pulchripennis =

Species of moth

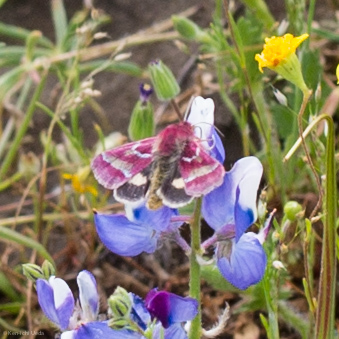
In the North Table Mountain Ecological Reserve in Butte, California.

Schinia pulchripennis, or the common flower moth, is a moth of the family Noctuidae that is distributed throughout North America, including California and Nevada.

Reproduction and development of the moth mainly occurs on Orthocarpus purascens of the plant family Orobanchaceae. This plant is also the larvae's food source. In addition to O. puprascens, S. pulchripennis also consumes the nectar on a variety of other plants.

== Description ==
S. pulchripennis have magenta forewings with pale yellow regions and dark brown hind wings with a white center. Additionally, the top of their thorax contains purple, grey, and black hair. Contrarily, the bottom of their thorax and abdomen contain yellow hair. The moth also has a wingspan that ranges from 17-21 mm.

== Distribution and habitat ==
The habitats of the moth include the desert (e.g. Mojave desert) and cismontane California.

== Development ==
=== Reproduction ===
Prior to reproduction, females remain at the blossom of O. pupurascens until a male approaches them to mate. Generally, females lay their eggs and place them between the blossom and the bract of the food plant. Compared to other species (e.g. Helicoverpa), Schinia lay relatively large eggs in the expense of low fecundity, ranging from tens to hundreds of eggs.

=== Maturation ===
Initially, the eggs are pale yellow, however they brown as incubation continues. Towards the end of the incubation period, head capsules and prothoracic shields begin to appear. Once the larvae hatch from the eggs, they travel towards the seed capsule, where they begin nesting and feeding. The larval stage, including all the stadiums, lasts for approximately 28.5 days. When the larvae reach the fourth or fifth stadium, they emerge from the seed capsule and move to the head of the blossom. At this point, they are able to consume both the flower and seeds of the plant. As they remain on the head of the blossom, they are able to avoid predators due to their ability to blend into the flower with their developed color and spot pattern. When the larvae are fully matured, they drop and tunnel into the ground, where they pupate. The moths then emerge from the ground during spring or winter when there is enough rain to germinate O. puparascens seeds.

== Diet ==
Adult S. pulchripennis receive their food source from the nectar of the following plants: Allium amplectens, Cryptantha spp., Lasthenia californica, Layia fremontii, and Layia platyglossa. In addition, the larvae feed on O. pupurascens, which is also known as Castilleja exserta.
