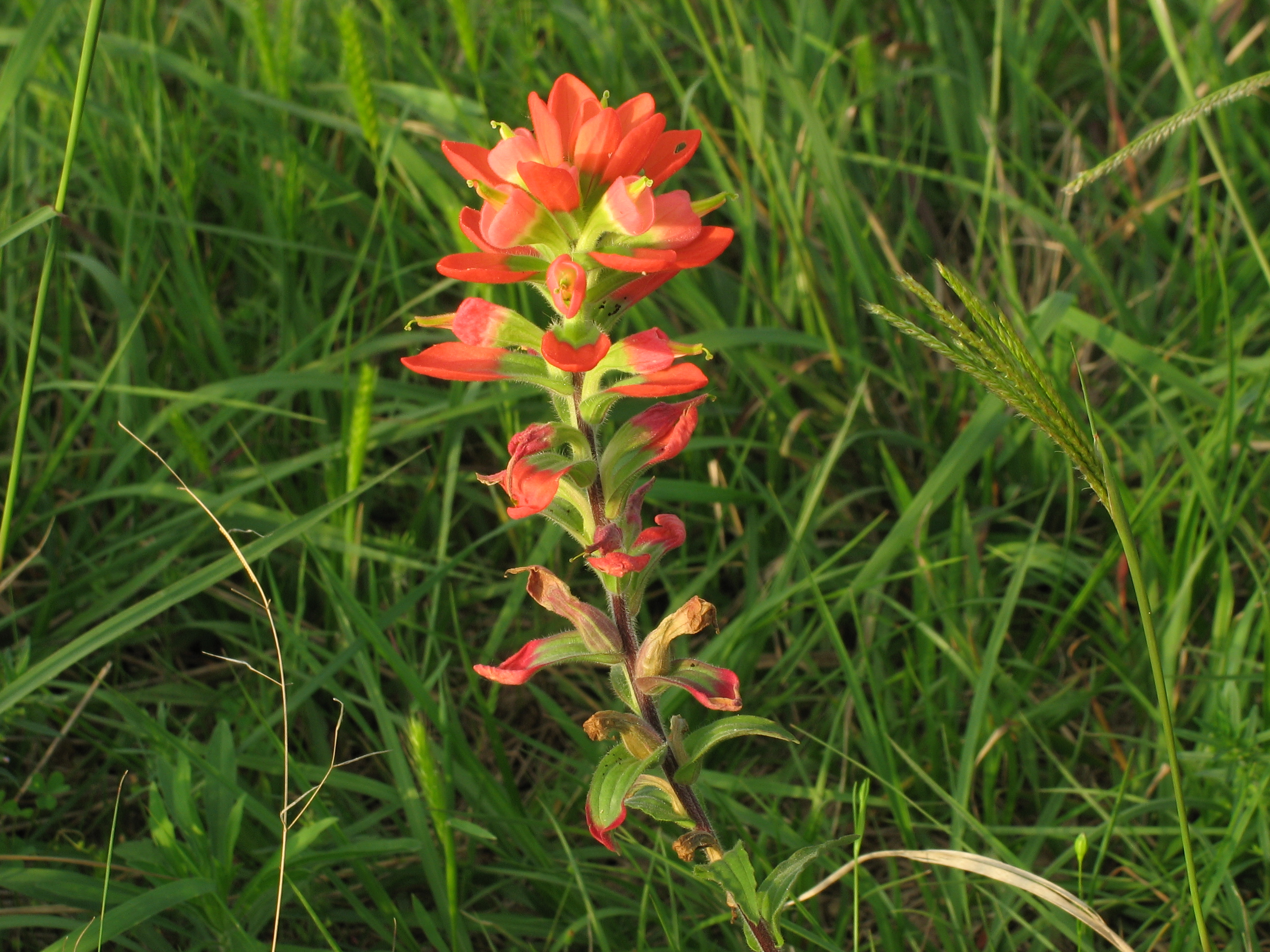

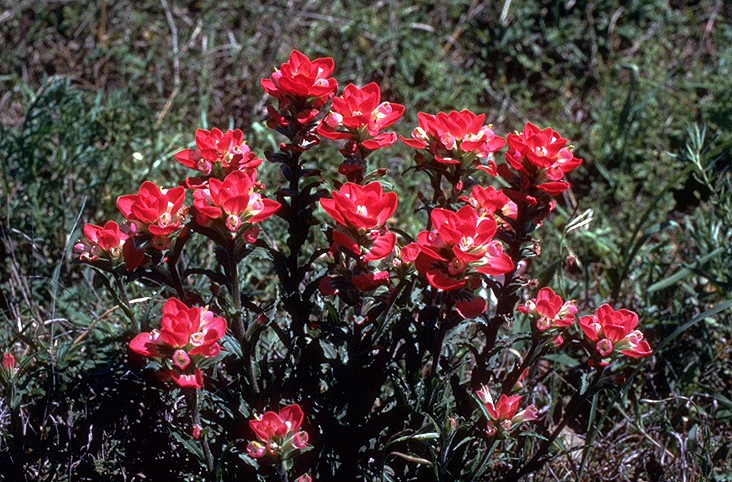

Scientific classification
- Kingdom: Plantae
- Clade: Tracheophytes
- Clade: Angiosperms
- Clade: Eudicots
- Clade: Asterids
- Order: Lamiales
- Family: Orobanchaceae
- Genus: Castilleja
- Species: C. indivisa

Binomial name
- Castilleja indivisa Engelm. 1845

= Castilleja indivisa =

Species of flowering plant

Castilleja indivisa, commonly known as Texas Indian paintbrush or entireleaf Indian paintbrush, is a hemiparasitic annual wildflower native to Texas, Louisiana, and Oklahoma in the United States. There are historical records of the species formerly growing in Arkansas, and reports of naturalized populations in Florida and Alabama.

The bright red leaf-like bracts surrounding the white to greenish flowers make the plant look like a ragged brush dipped in red paint. They sometimes produce a light yellow or pure white variation mixed in with the reds.

Each plant typically grows up to 18 in (46 cm) in height. The leaves are long and stalkless. The roots grow until they reach the roots of other plants, mainly grasses, and then penetrate the roots of the "host" plant to obtain a portion of their needed nutrients (known as semi- or hemiparasitic).

Texas paintbrush typically blooms in the spring and summer. Some of its native habitats include prairies, meadows, pastures and roadsides.

== Gallery ==
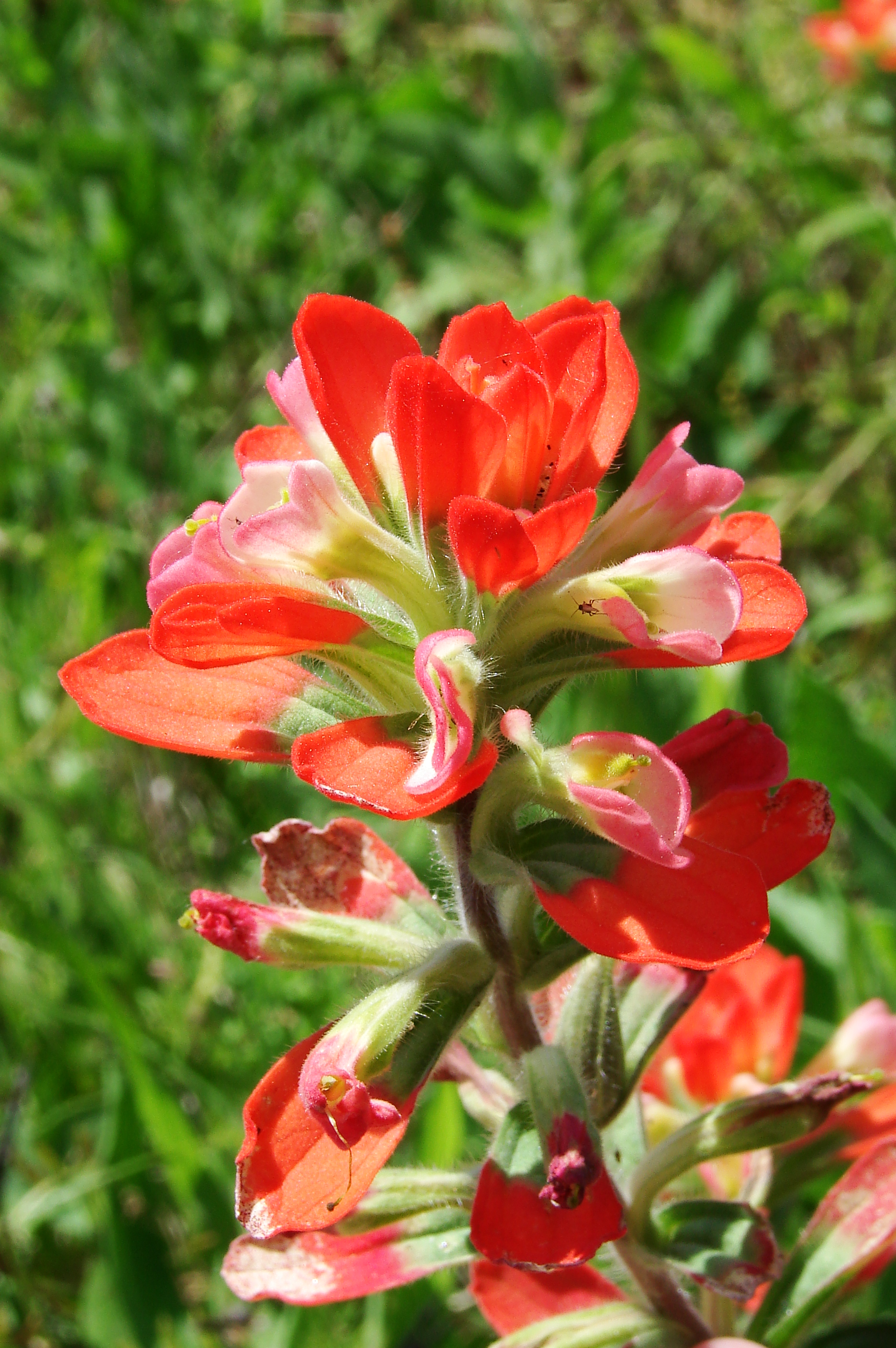
In North Texas

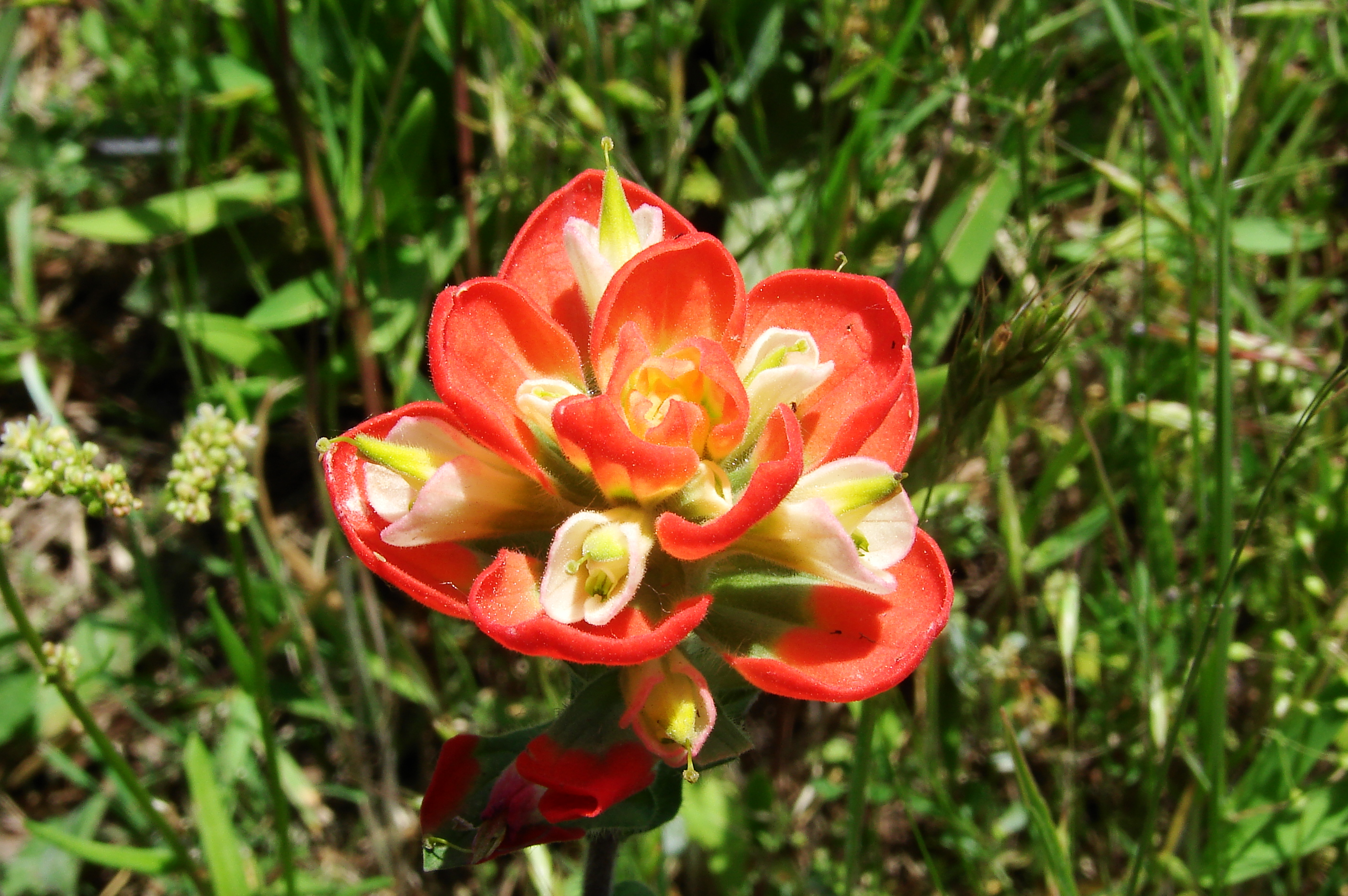
In North Texas

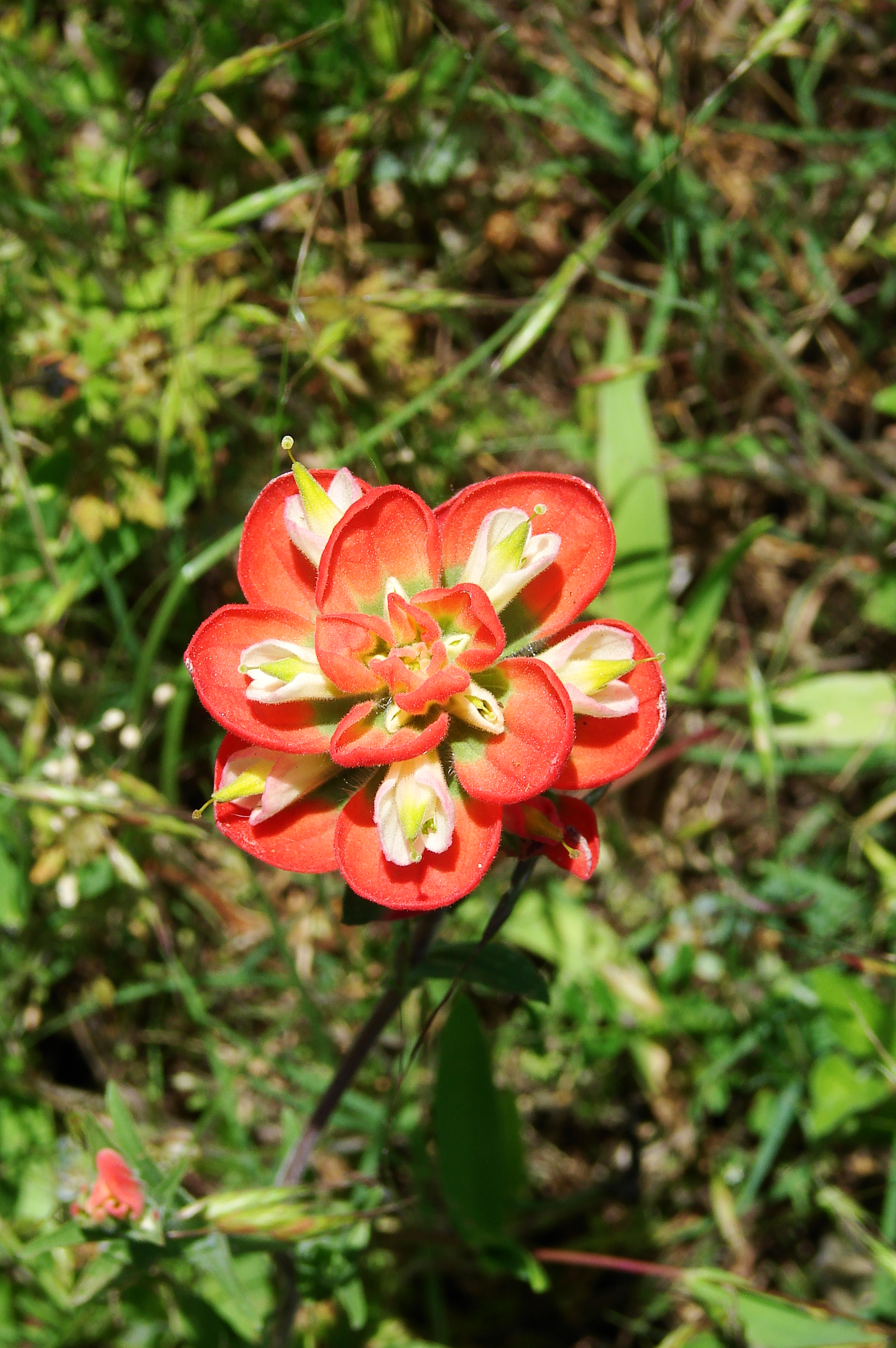
In North Texas

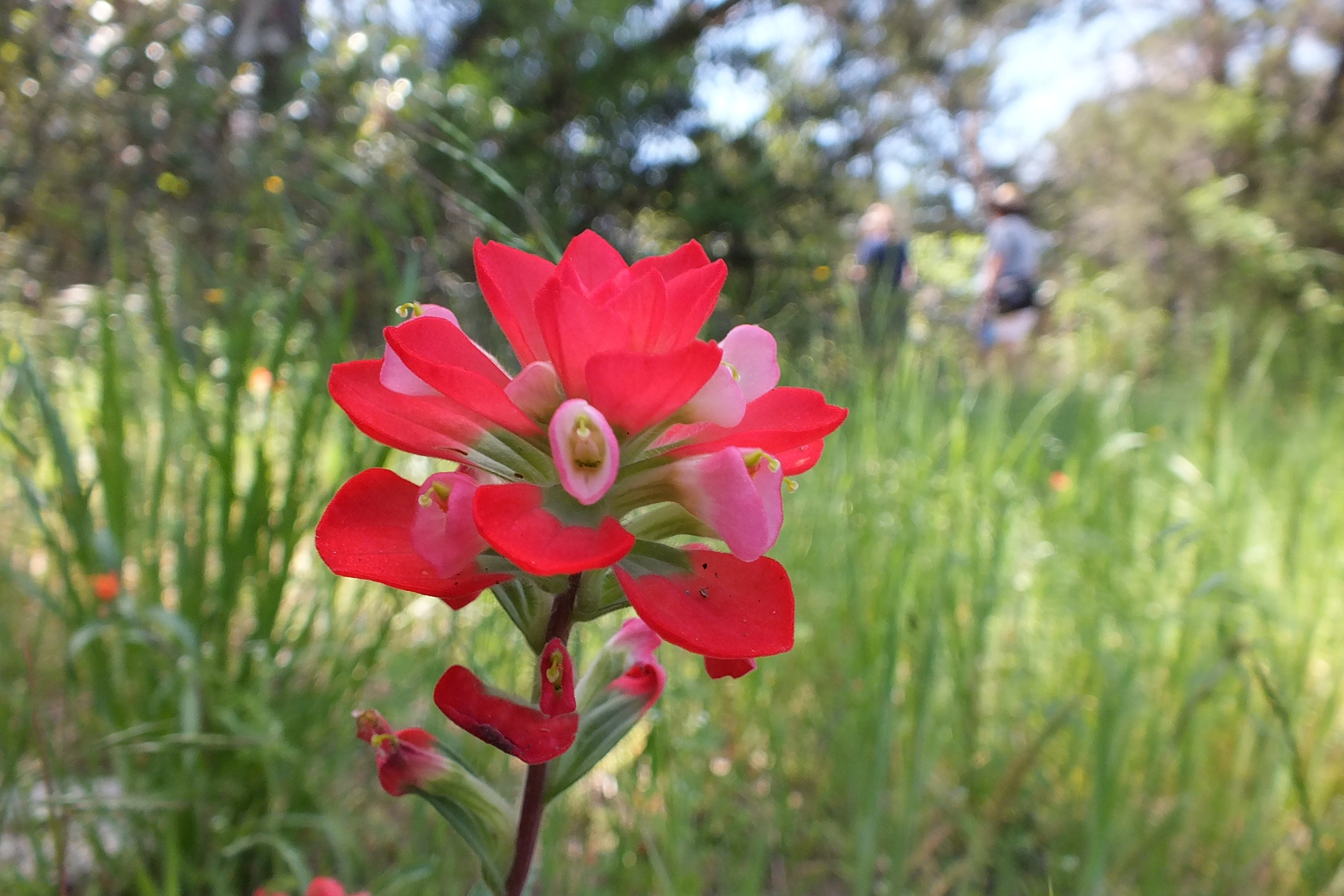
In Burnet County

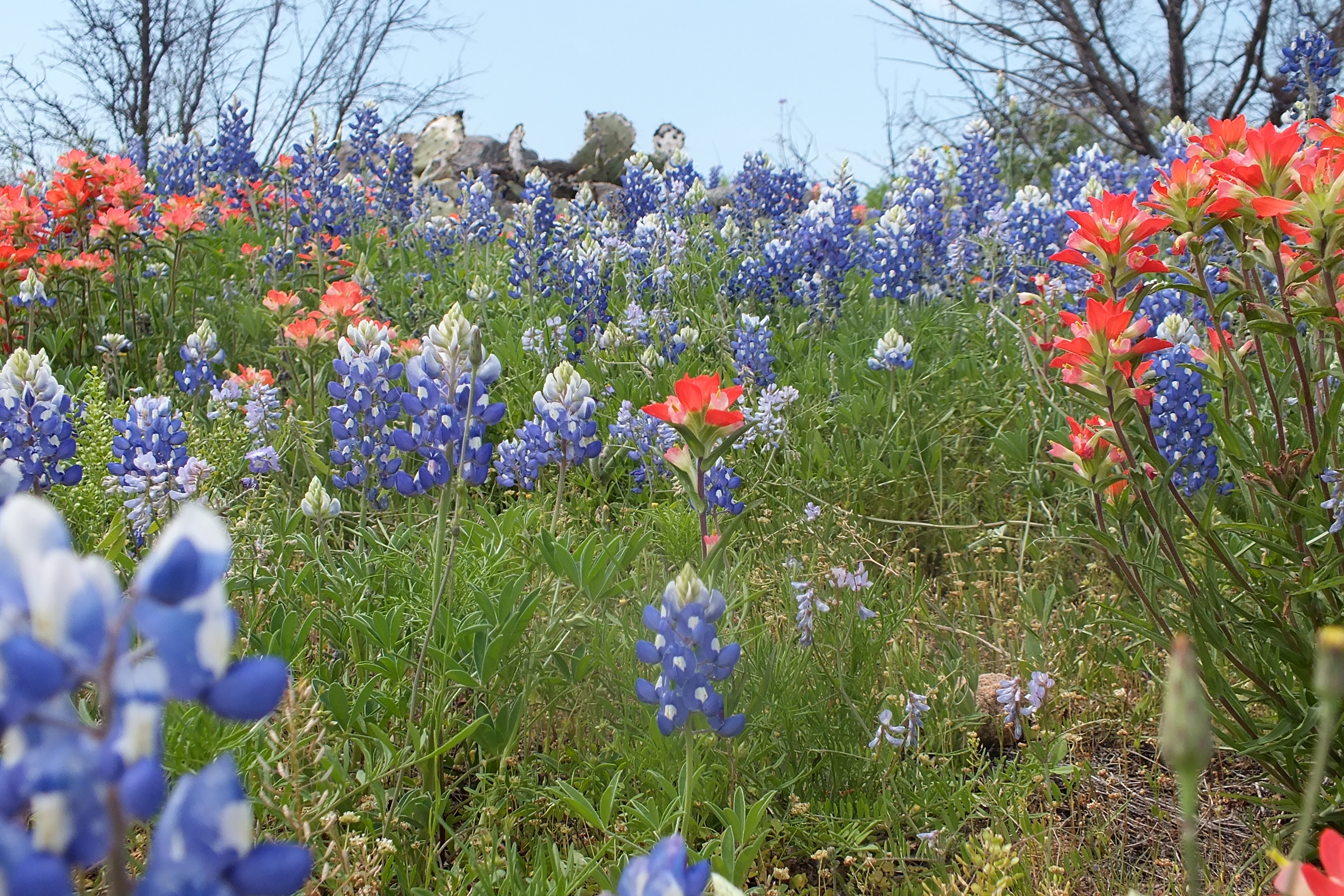
Paintbrushes and Bluebonnets
in Burnet County

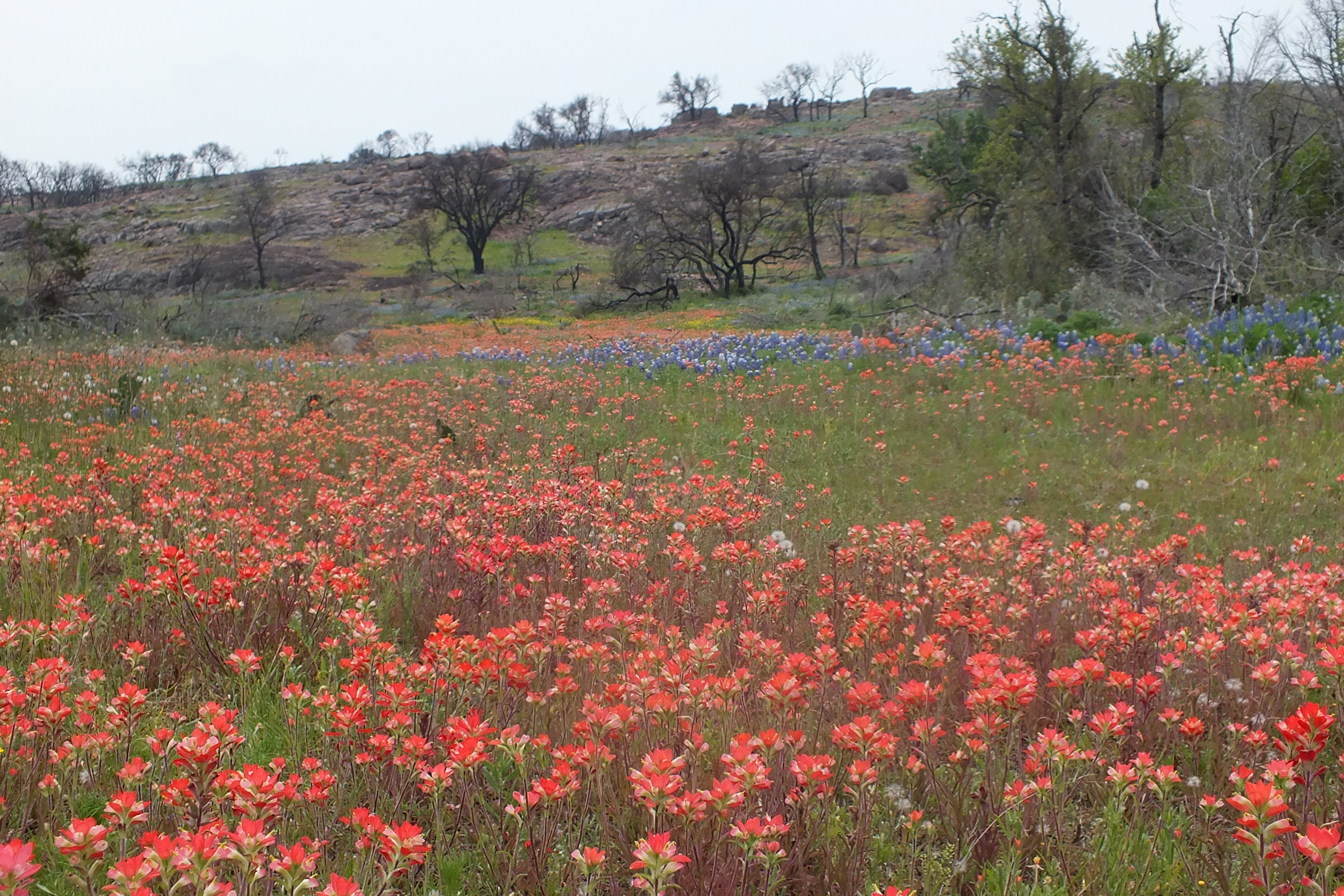
Paintbrushes and Bluebonnets
in Burnet County
