= Domingo Castillejo =

- Born: unknown Lorca, Murcia, Spain
- Died: 1786
- Scientific career
- Fields: botany

Domingo Castillejo or Castillejos (died 1786) was a Spanish botanist, surgeon, and professor. From 1770 to 1786, he served as a professor of materia medica and botany at the Royal Naval College of Surgery in Cádiz, during which time his studies were devoted to the flora of the southern Iberian Peninsula. Among the many positions he held during this time was Cádiz correspondent for the Royal Botanical Garden of Madrid; in this position he received many new plants imported from the New World, and acclimatized them for distribution to other nurseries throughout Spain and the Canary Islands.

The illustrious botanist José Celestino Mutis, a contemporary of Castillejo, named the plant genus Castilleja in his honor.

Following Castillejo's death, his academic position was filled by another of his students, Francisco Arjona, who continued Castillejo's studies of the flora of the Cádiz region.
