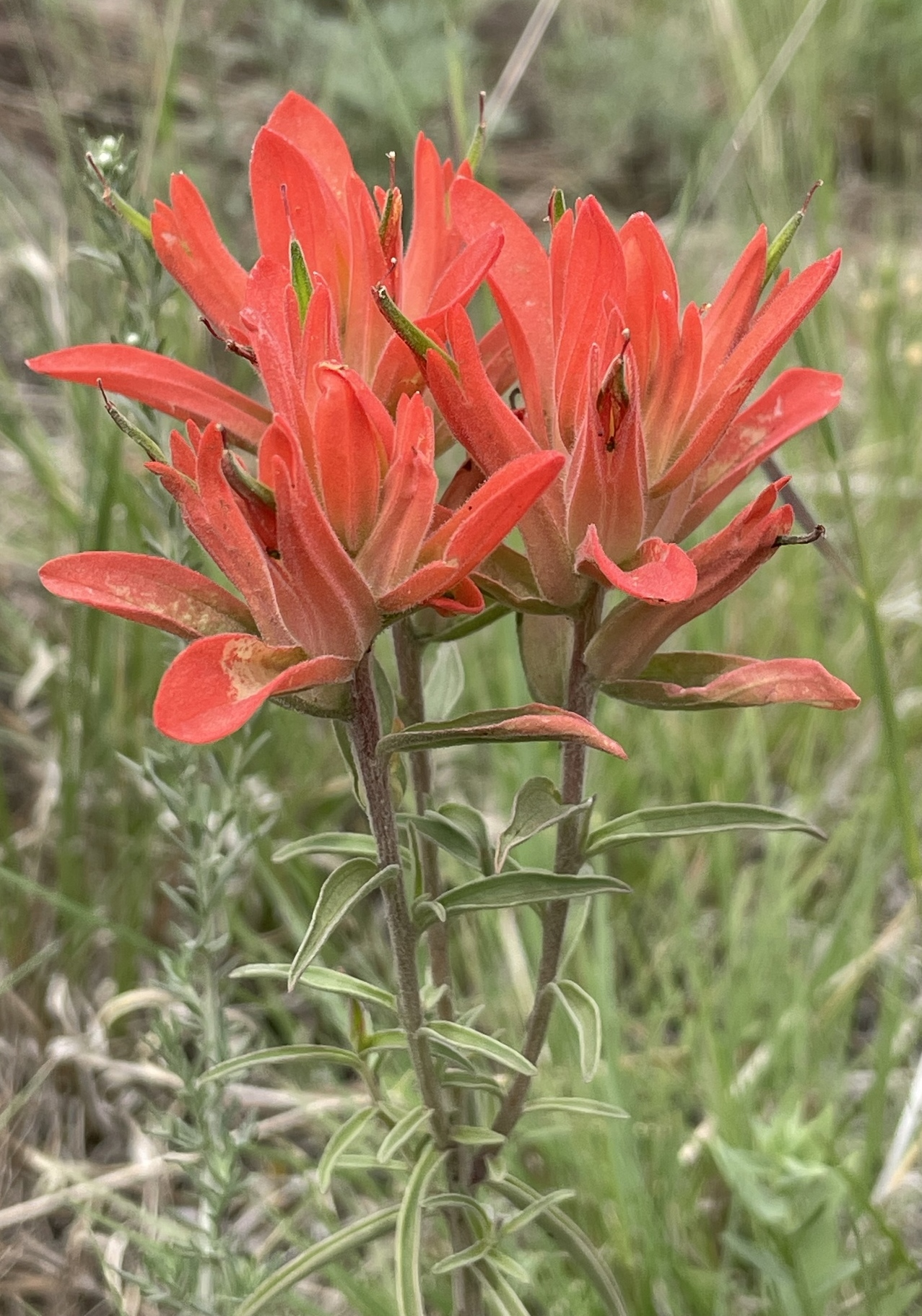
- Castilleja integra flowering stem in Coconino National Forest, Arizona

Scientific classification
- Kingdom: Plantae
- Clade: Tracheophytes
- Clade: Angiosperms
- Clade: Eudicots
- Clade: Asterids
- Order: Lamiales
- Family: Orobanchaceae
- Subtribe: Castillejinae
- Genus: Castilleja; Mutis ex L.f.

Species
- See List of Castilleja species

Synonyms
- Clevelandia Greene; Euchroma Nutt.; Gentrya Breedlove & Heckard; Oncorhynchus Lehm.; Ophiocephalus Wiggins

= Castilleja =

Genus of flowering plants in the broomrape family

Castilleja (/kəˈstɪliə/ kə-STIL-ee-ə or /ˌkæstɪˈleɪə/ KAS-til-AY-ə), commonly known as paintbrushes, painted cups, or prairie-fire, is a genus of about 200 species of annual and perennial mostly herbaceous plants native to the west of the Americas from Alaska south to the Andes, northern Asia, and one species as far west as the Kola Peninsula in northwestern Russia. These plants are classified in the broomrape family Orobanchaceae (following major rearrangements of the order Lamiales starting around 2001; sources which do not follow these reclassifications may place them in the Scrophulariaceae). They are hemiparasitic on the roots of grasses and forbs. The genus was named after Spanish botanist Domingo Castillejo.

== Taxonomy ==
Castilleja was scientifically described by Carl Linnaeus the Younger using a partial description by José Celestino Bruno Mutis in 1782. The type species was Castilleja fissifolia from Columbia. The genus as a whole has never been renamed, however five others were described and named that are considered to be synonyms of Castilleja. For example, in 1818 Thomas Nuttall described a genus that he named Euchroma meaning "finely colored", moving the species now known as Castilleja coccinea out of Bartsia where it had been placed by Carl Linnaeus. It is also named Euchroma grandiflora, as another species. However, Nutttall's Euchroma grandiflora had already been named and correctly placed as Castilleja sessiliflora by Frederick Traugott Pursh in 1813.

=== Species ===
There are 216 species that are considered valid by Plants of the World Online. More than half, 119 species, are native to North America north of Mexico.

=== Names ===
The name Castilleja was chosen by Mutis as an honor for the Spanish naturalist Domingo Castillejo. Castillejo was a professor of medical materials and botany at the Cadiz Royal College of Surgery between 1770 and 1786. Mutis wrote in Latin, "Ab Stemodia quantum ex characteríbus video, valde diversa haec singularissimeplanta, proculdubio numeranda ínter Didynamas. Castillejam dixi in merítissimum honorem D. Castillejo Botanici Gadensis." The genus is variously known by the common names paintbrushes, painted cups, and prairie-fire. It is also known as Indian paintbrush.

== Description ==
The species in Castilleja are quite varied in form and lifecycle. The genus includes many species that are completely herbaceous, lacking woody material in their above-ground parts. Though it also includes some slightly woody subshrubs and even a few woody shrubs. They may grow as annual plants, but most of the species are perennial. Their roots are equally diverse in structure ranging from taproots to fibrous root systems. Some species also have modified underground stems called rhizomes to spread short distances.

Stem lengths range from a minute 1 centimeter to as much as 2 meters. In almost all species the leaves are attached to the stems and alternating. The inflorescences are always at the ends of the stems, which may or may not branch. The inflorescence usually have bracts that are brightly colored for the whole length or towards their ends.

== Ecology ==
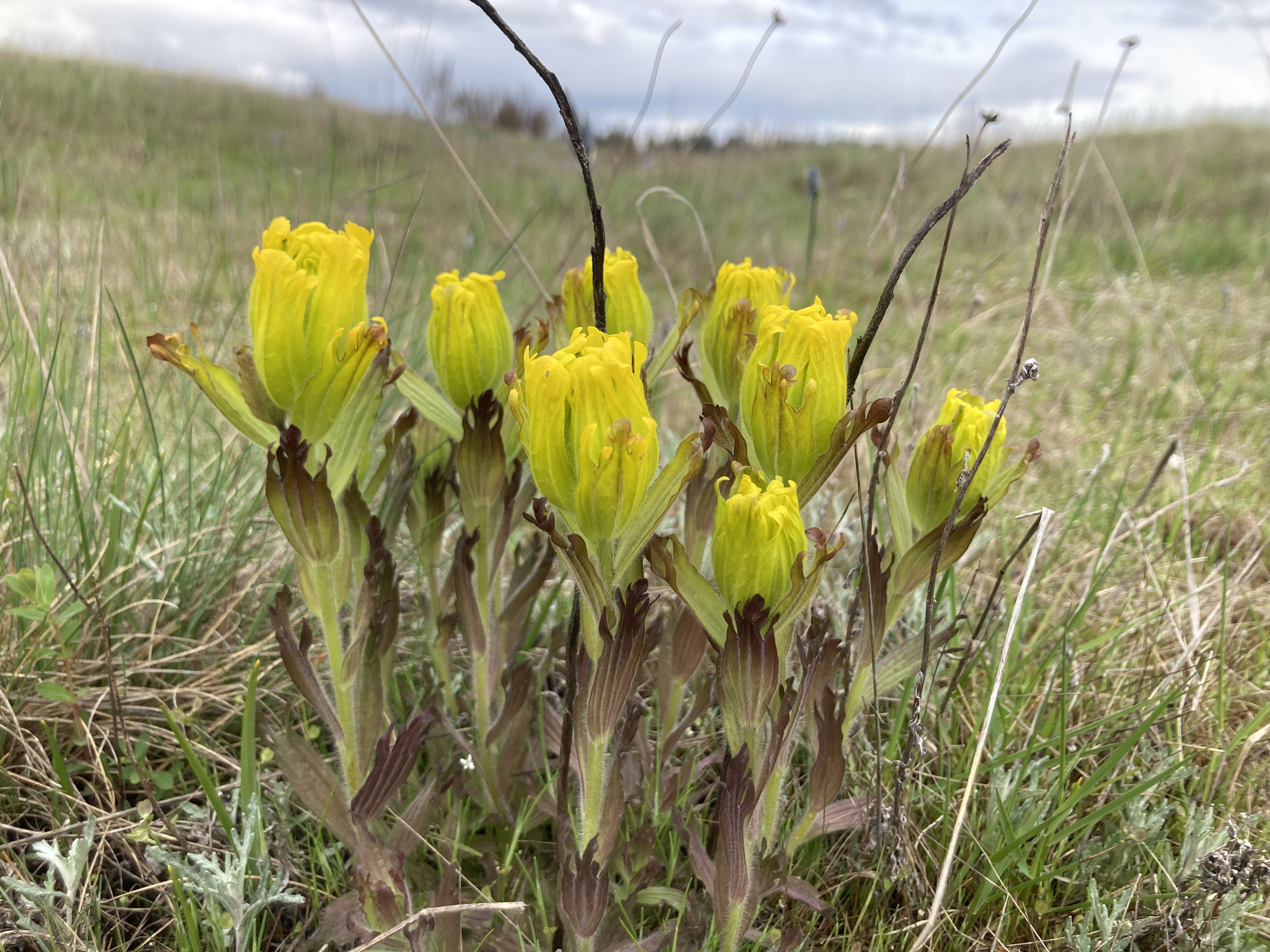
Castilleja levisecta in Mima Mounds Natural Area Preserve, Washington

Castilleja species are eaten by the larvae of some lepidopteran species, including Schinia cupes (which has been recorded on C. exserta) and Schinia pulchripennis (which feeds exclusively on C. exserta), and checkerspot butterflies, such as Euphydryas species. Pollinators aid these plants in reproduction, with insects visiting the flowers, as well as hummingbirds for some species.

Castilleja species can play an important role in plant community dynamics and multitrophic interactions. For example, Castilleja hemiparasitic reliance on other plant species may affect competition and dominance among other plant species in its community. Additionally, the foliage of some Castilleja species naturally contains defensive compounds that are sequestered in the tissues of larvae of specialist insect species that have developed a tolerance for these compounds and are able to consume the foliage. These sequestered compounds then confer chemical protection against predators to larvae.

== Hybridization ==
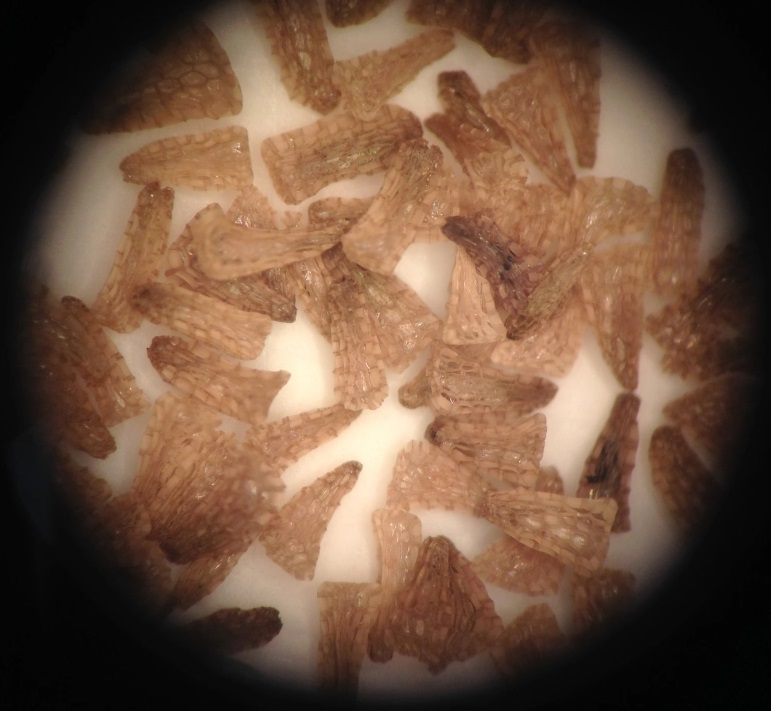
Seeds of putative Castilleja levisecta × Castilleja hispida hybrid

Some species in the Castilleja genus are able to hybridize, especially when ploidy levels match, and hybrids may produce viable seed. This hybridization potential has been identified as a threat to the genetic integrity of certain endangered Castilleja species.

== Uses ==
The author Gregory L. Tilford claims that the flowers of Indian paintbrush are edible. However, these plants have a tendency to absorb and concentrate selenium in their tissues from the soils in which they grow, and can be potentially very toxic if the roots or green parts of the plant are consumed. Highly alkaline soils increase the selenium levels in the plants. In addition Castilleja species will take up alkaloids from other plants when parasitizing them.

== Symbolism ==
Castilleja linariifolia is the state flower of Wyoming.
