= List of Scrophulariales of Montana =

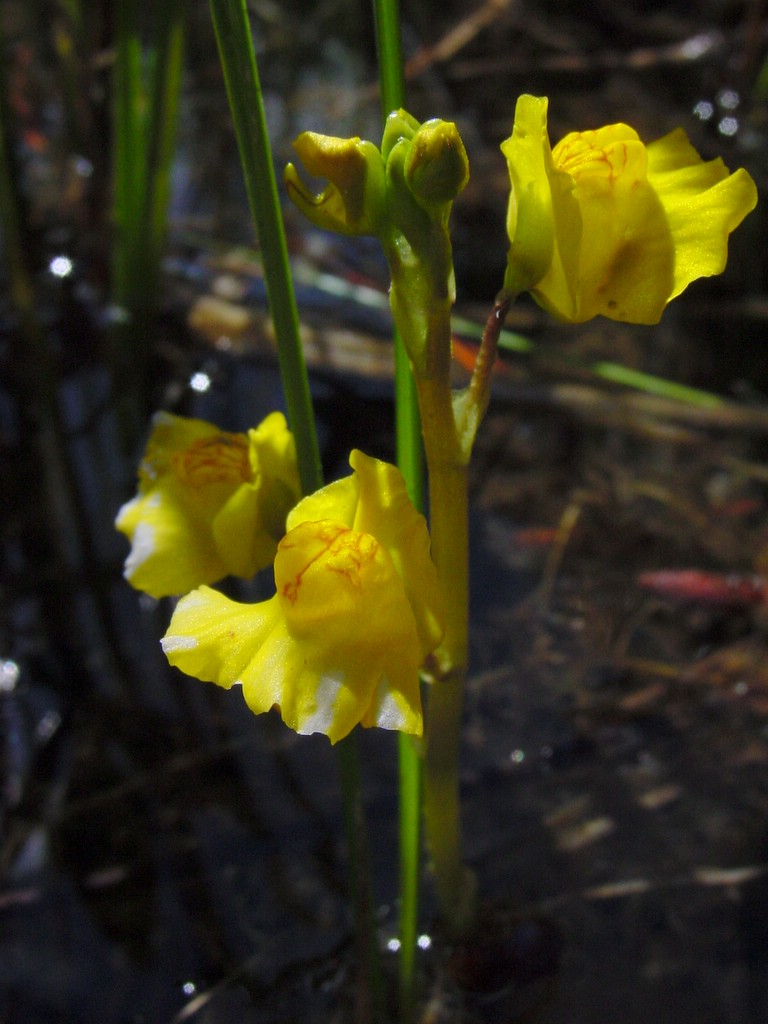
Greater bladderwort, Utricularia macrorhiza

There are at least 73 members of the Scrophulariales order, Scrophulariales, found in Montana. Some of these species are exotics (not native to Montana) and some species have been designated as Species of Concern.

== Bladderwort ==
Family: Lentibulariaceae

- Pinguicula macroceras, California butterwort
- Utricularia intermedia, flat-leaved bladderwort
- Utricularia macrorhiza, greater bladderwort
- Utricularia minor, lesser bladderwort

== Bloomrape ==
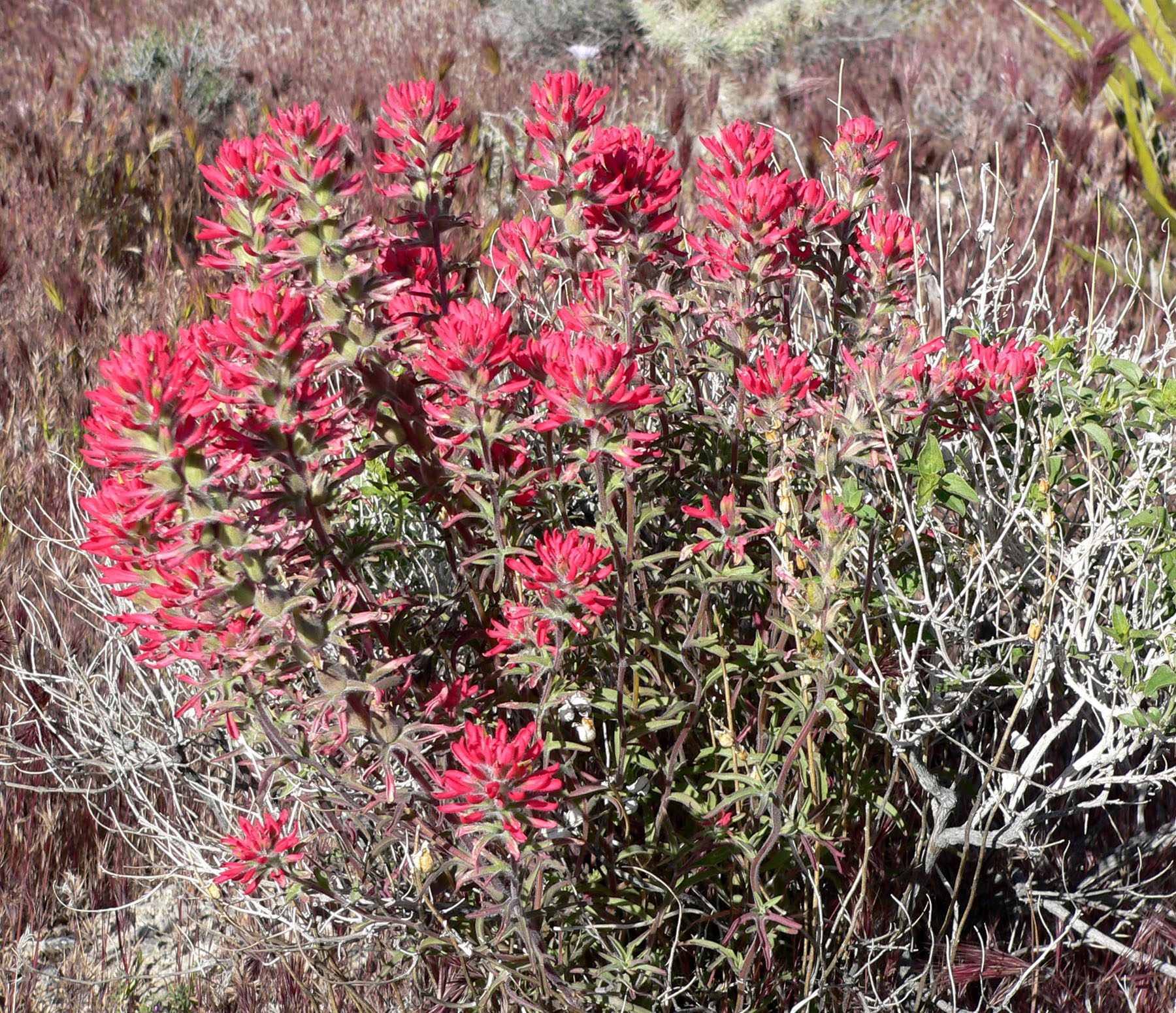
Desert Indian paintbrush, Castilleja angustifolia

Family: Orobanchaceae

- Castilleja angustifolia, desert Indian paintbrush
- Castilleja cervina, deer Indian paintbrush
- Castilleja covilleana, Coville Indian paintbrush
- Castilleja crista-galli, greater red Indian paintbrush
- Castilleja cusickii, Cusick's Indian paintbrush
- Castilleja flava, yellow Indian paintbrush
- Castilleja flava var. flava, yellow Indian paintbrush
- Castilleja flava var. rustica, rustic Indian paintbrush
- Castilleja gracillima, slender Indian paintbrush
- Castilleja hispida, harsh Indian paintbrush
- Castilleja linariifolia, Wyoming Indian paintbrush
- Castilleja lutescens, stiff yellowish Indian paintbrush
- Castilleja miniata, greater red Indian paintbrush
- Castilleja minor, thread-torch paintbrush
- Castilleja nivea, snow Indian paintbrush
- Castilleja occidentalis, western Indian paintbrush
- Castilleja pallescens, pallid Indian paintbrush
- Castilleja pilosa, parrot-head Indian paintbrush
- Castilleja pilosa var. longispica, parrot-head Indian paintbrush
- Castilleja pulchella, showy Indian paintbrush
- Castilleja rhexiifolia, rhexia-leaf Indian paintbrush
- Castilleja sessiliflora, downy Indian paintbrush
- Castilleja sulphurea, sulphur Indian paintbrush
- Cordylanthus capitatus, Yakima bird's-beak
- Cordylanthus ramosus, much-branded birds-beak
- Euphrasia subarctica, arctic eyebright
- Melampyrum lineare, American cow-wheat
- Orobanche corymbosa, flat-topped broomrape
- Orobanche fasciculata, clustered broomrape
- Orobanche ludoviciana, Louisiana broomrape
- Orobanche uniflora, one-flowered broomrape
- Orthocarpus luteus, yellow owl's-clover
- Orthocarpus tenuifolius, thin-leaved owl's-clover
- Orthocarpus tolmiei, Tolmie's owl's-clover
- Pedicularis bracteosa, bracted lousewort
- Pedicularis bracteosa var. bracteosa, bracted lousewort
- Pedicularis bracteosa var. canbyi, Canby's lousewort
- Pedicularis bracteosa var. paysoniana, Payson's lousewort
- Pedicularis contorta var. contorta, coiled lousewort
- Pedicularis contorta, curve-beak lousewort
- Pedicularis contorta var. ctenophora, pink coil-beaked lousewort
- Pedicularis contorta var. rubicunda, Selway coil-beaked lousewort
- Pedicularis crenulata, scallop-leaf lousewort
- Pedicularis cystopteridifolia, fern-leaved lousewort
- Pedicularis groenlandica, elephant's-head lousewort
- Pedicularis oederi, Oeder's lousewort
- Pedicularis parryi, Parry's lousewort
- Pedicularis pulchella, mountain lousewort
- Pedicularis racemosa, leafy lousewort
- Rhinanthus minor, little yellow-rattle

== Figwort ==
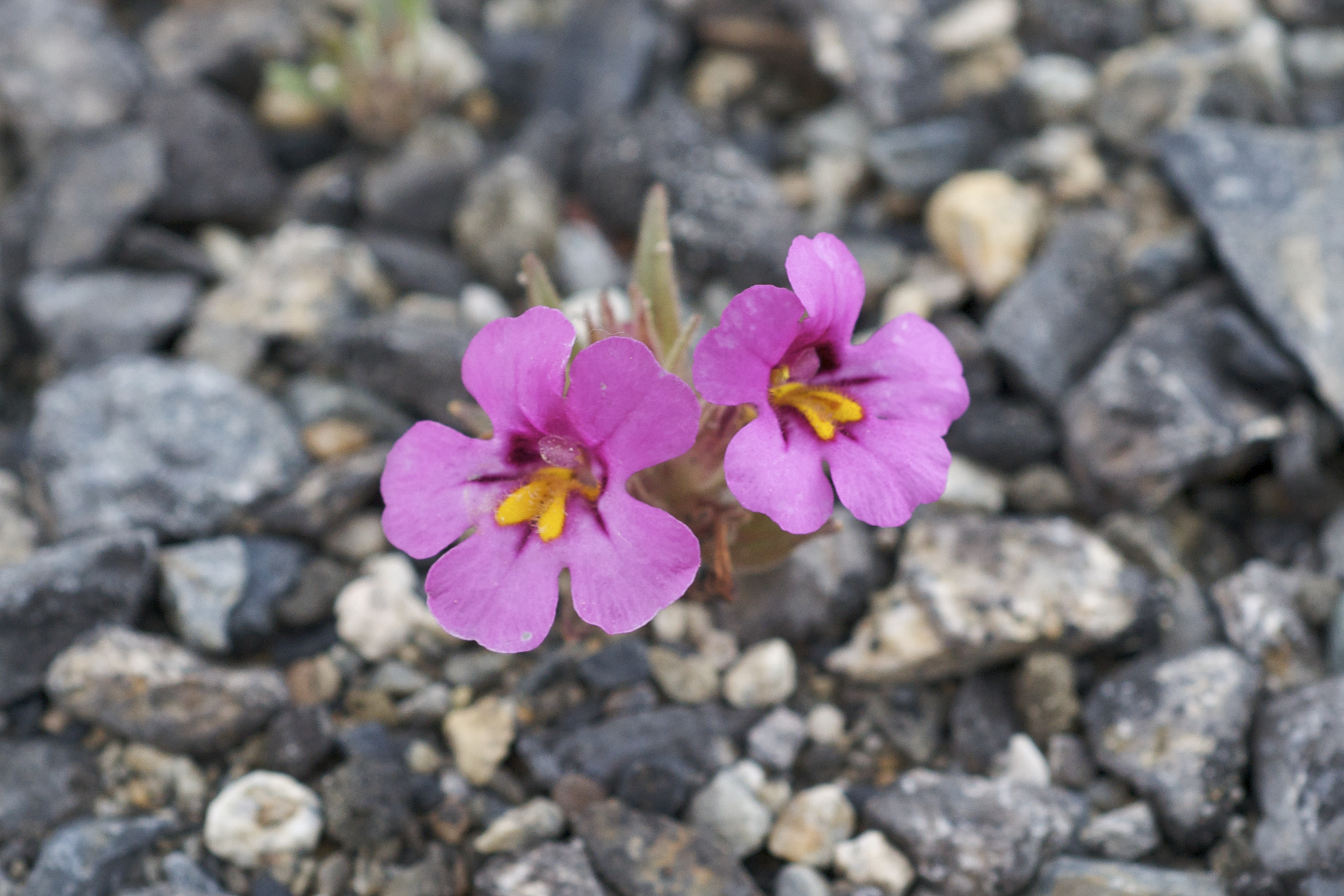
Dwarf purple monkeyflower, Mimulus nanus

Family: Scrophulariaceae

- Mimulus ampliatus, stalk-leaved monkeyflower
- Mimulus breviflorus, short-flowered monkeyflower
- Mimulus breweri, Brewer's monkeyflower
- Mimulus clivicola, North Idaho monkeyflower
- Mimulus floribundus, floriferous monkeyflower
- Mimulus glabratus, roundleaf monkeyflower
- Mimulus guttatus, common large monkeyflower
- Mimulus hymenophyllus, thinsepal monkeyflower
- Mimulus lewisii, Lewis' monkeyflower
- Mimulus moschatus, muskflower
- Mimulus nanus, dwarf purple monkeyflower
- Mimulus primuloides, primrose monkeyflower
- Mimulus ringens, square-stem monkeyflower
- Mimulus suksdorfii, Suksdorf monkeyflower
- Mimulus tilingii, subalpine monkeyflower
- Scrophularia lanceolata, hare figwort
- Verbascum blattaria, white moth mullein
- Verbascum thapsus, common mullein

== Olive ==
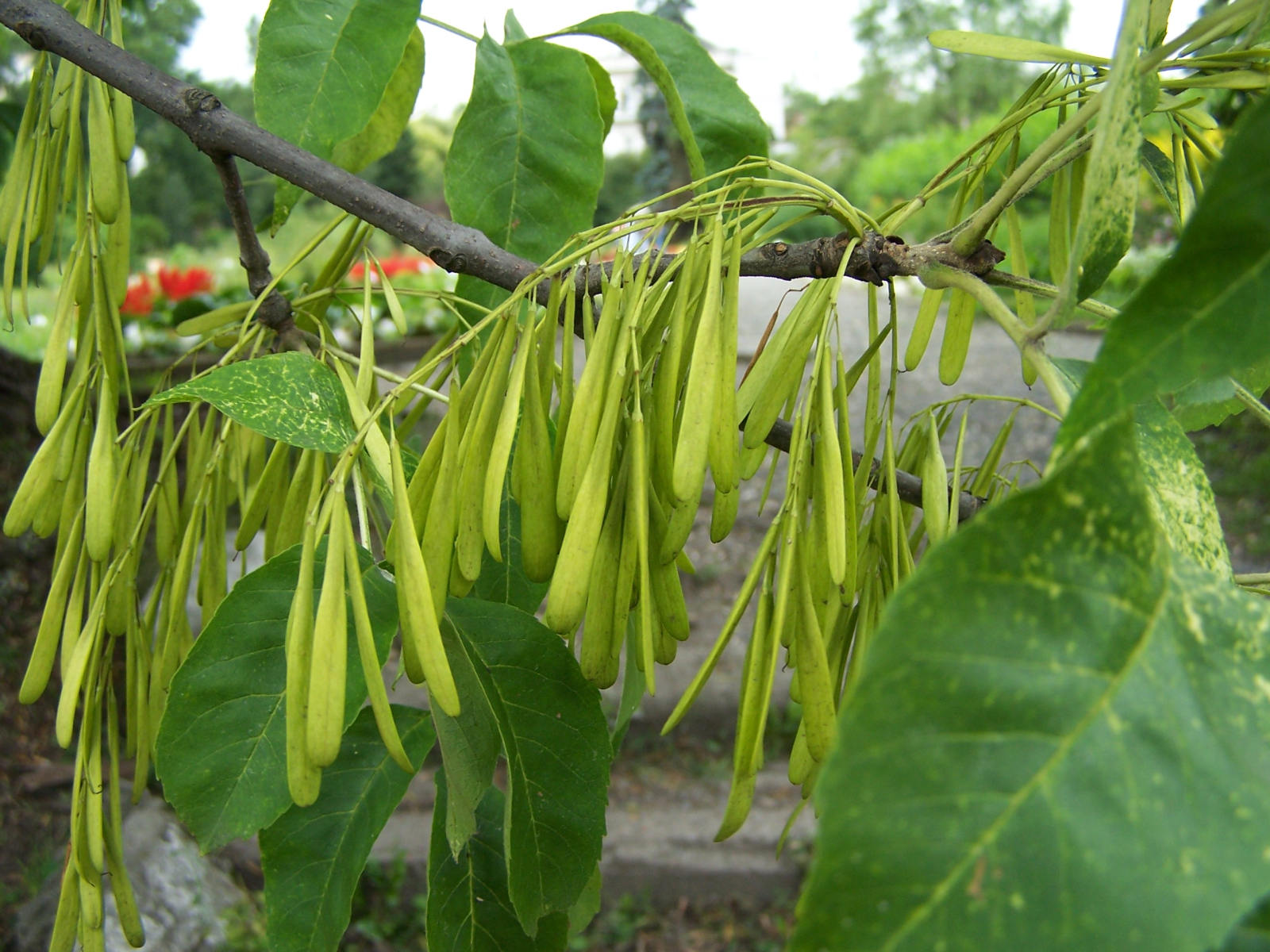
Green ash, Fraxinus pennsylvanica

Family: Oleaceae

- Fraxinus pennsylvanica, green ash

== See also ==
- List of dicotyledons of Montana
