= Alpine paintbrush (disambiguation) =

List of plants with the same or similar names

Alpine paintbrush is a common name of three species of plant:

- Castilleja puberula, the primary species known by this name, found in Colorado and Montana
- Castilleja rhexiifolia, a widespread species from British Columbia to New Mexico with pink to red flowers
- Castilleja septentrionalis, a widespread species from New Mexico to northern Canada and east to Labrador with yellow flowers
