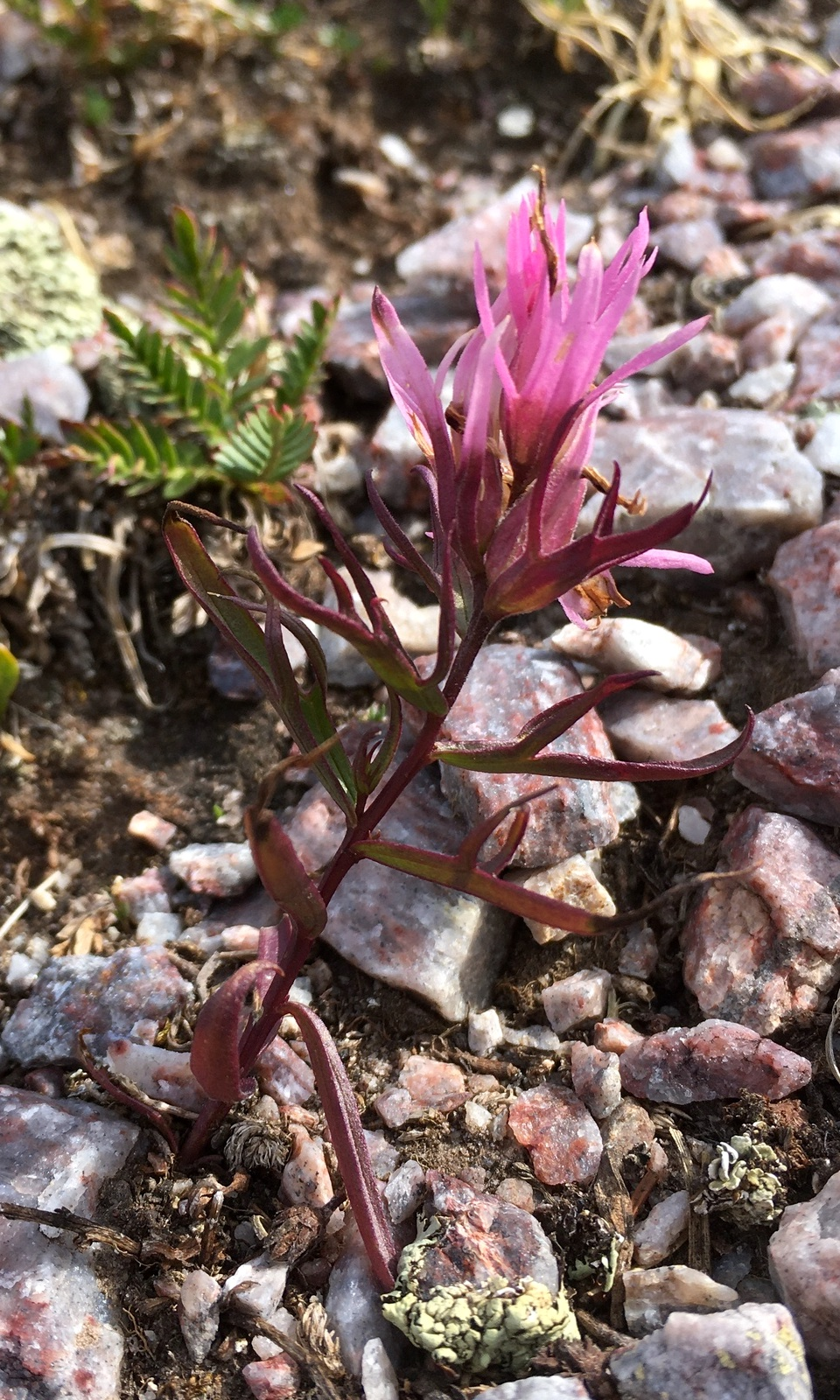
- Castilleja haydenii blooming in the Pecos Wilderness

Scientific classification
- Kingdom: Plantae
- Clade: Tracheophytes
- Clade: Angiosperms
- Clade: Eudicots
- Clade: Asterids
- Order: Lamiales
- Family: Orobanchaceae
- Genus: Castilleja
- Species: C. haydenii

Binomial name
- Castilleja haydenii (A.Gray) Cockerell

Synonyms
- Castilleja pallida var. haydenii

= Castilleja haydenii =

Rocky Mountain species of paintbrush flower

Castilleja haydenii, also known as Hayden's paintbrush, is a species of flower found in the mountains of southern Colorado and northern New Mexico, generally above timberline in the alpine tundra. Its purple flowers appear in the months of July through September. It was named after the geologist Ferdinand Vandeveer Hayden.

== Description ==
Castilleja haydenii is herbaceous plant that reaches 7–20 centimeters in height when full grown. It is a perennial species that regrows each year from a woody caudex atop a taproot. Plants may have a few or many stems that do not branch. The stems either spread or grow outwards from the base a short distance before growing upwards (ascending) and are often somewhat purple colored. Though the stems lack branches, they may have short, leafy shoots above where its leaves attach to the stems (the axils). Stems are hairless at the base and sparely or densely covered in short, soft, erect hairs (puberulent) towards their ends (distal).

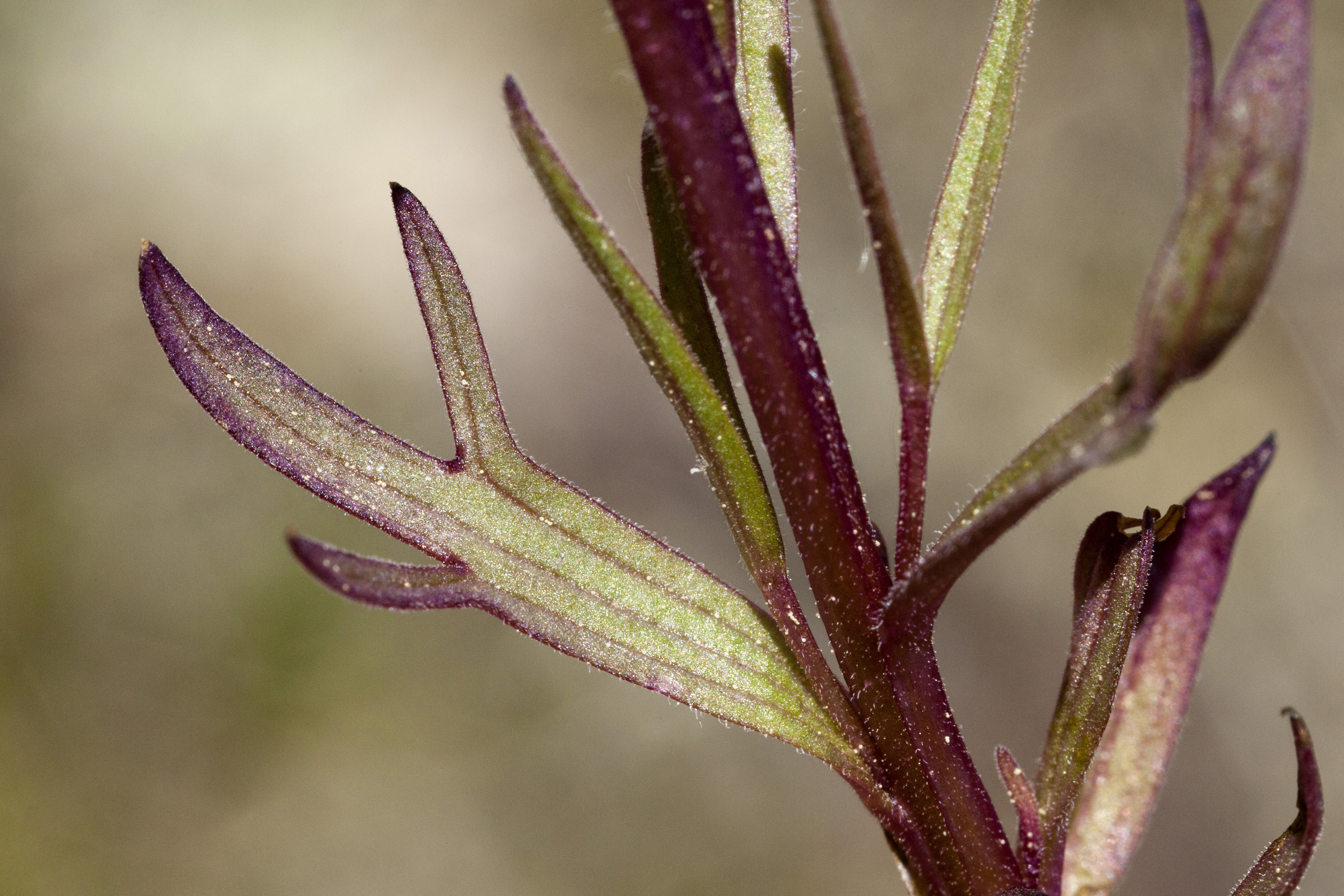
Leaves photographed in the Sangre de Cristo Mountains, south-southeast of Taos

The leaves are green to purple in color and 2–8 centimeters in length, though occasionally just 1.1 centimeters long. Their outline is like a leaf of grass (linear leaves) or a narrow spear head (narrow lanceolate). The leaves often become wider towards the top of the plant. Most of the leaves are divided into lobes at the end, typically three to seven, but occasionally none or as many as nine, and undivided leaves are more likely lower down on plant stems. They are also more common on plants growing in the northwest of the plant's range toward Utah.

Blooming may commence between July and September. The inflorescence is showy with bracts that are crimson, rose-red, or lilac-purple, very rarely they may be yellow. The inflorescence is at the end of a stem and range in size from 2.5–5.5 centimeters in length and 1.5–2.5 centimeters in width. The bracts may be uniform in color or may be somewhat green or dull purple in color towards their bases. The bracts are variable from like an egg with the wide portion towards the base (ovate) to more of a flattened circle with the widest portion in the middle (elliptical) in shape. They are always divided into lobes, usually three to seven, but sometimes as many as thirteen. The bracts may be hairless (glabrous) or covered in very fine hairs (pilose), but are very likely to have hairs on the veins.

Castilleja rhexiifolia can be confused with it where their ranges overlap, but C. rehexiifolia is typically taller and the majority of the leaves are without lobes or have three lobes at most, while C. haydenii has typically has three or more lobes on its leaves.

== Taxonomy ==
Castilleja haydenii was first scientifically described by Asa Gray as a botanical variety that he named Castilleja pallida var. haydenii in 1878. Gray described it from specimens collected from Sierra Blanca in southern Colorado and thought that it was a variety despite its differences from C. pallida due to similarities to another variety he named Castilleia pállida var. occidentális. In 1890 the botanist Theodore D. A. Cockerell reclassified it as a species. Cockerell believed it to be a species due to his observations of the plants in Custer County, Colorado near the headwaters of Brush Creek in the Sangre de Cristo Mountains.

Hybrids with Castilleja occidentalis have been found in the lower elevation areas where their habitats overlap.

=== Names ===
The species name was given to honor the surveyor and geologist Ferdinand Vandeveer Hayden who lead several expeditions mapping the western United States in the 1800s. Its English common names, "Hayden paintedcup" and "Hayden's paintbrush", also reference Hayden.

== Range and habitat ==
The range of Castilleja haydenii is primarily in southern Colorado and northern New Mexico with one known occurrence in the La Sal Mountains in Utah. The majority of the range is in nine counties in Colorado, most around the margins of the San Luis Valley, and also counties to the west that include the San Juan Mountains. The three counties in New Mexico, Mora, Rio Arriba, and Taos are likewise mountainous.

The species is limited to high elevation slopes at 3200–4300 meters, generally above timberline. Though it also grows in subalpine meadows. It is particularly known for growing on rocky slopes and in fellfields in the mountain tundra. It is endemic to the Southern Rocky Mountains, growing nowhere else in the world.

=== Conservation ===
Castilleja haydenii has not been evaluated at the global level by NatureServe, but at the state level it is apparently secure (S4) in New Mexico and has not been evaluated in Colorado.

== Ecology ==
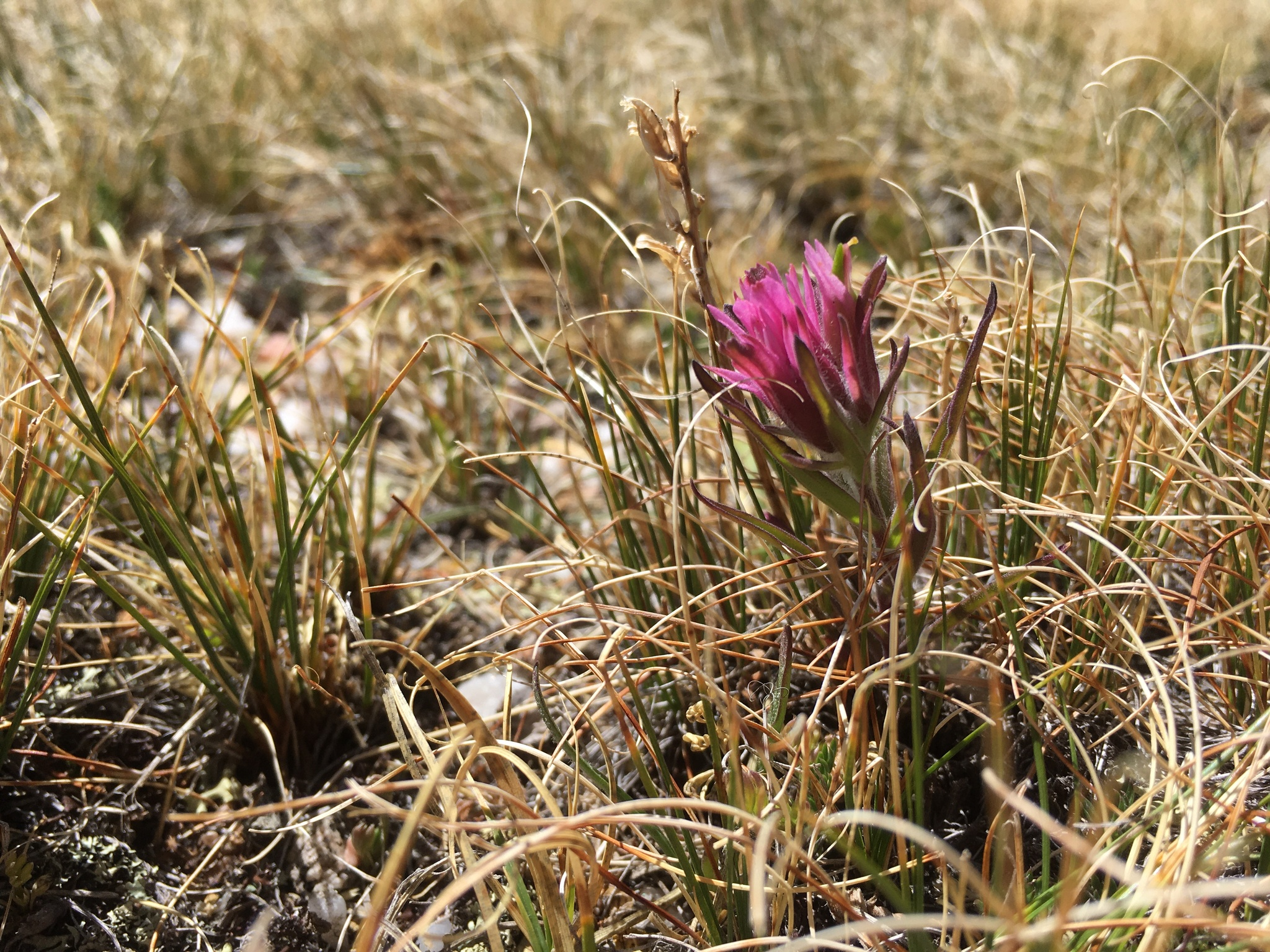
Castilleja haydenii in Taos County, New Mexico near the Colorado boarder

Castilleja haydenii is most often found growing with bunch grasses.

== Uses ==
Castilleja haydenii was evaluated for its potential as a garden species at the Aberdeen Research and Extension Center, but none of the seeds sprouted in the greenhouse experiments. The seeds had been cold stratified for eight weeks at 4.4 °C (40 °F) and then planted into flats in a greenhouse kept at 27 °C (81 °F) during the day and 13 °C (55 °F) at night. However, the researcher David A. Nelson had more success evaluating it with Penstemon strictus in the Mid-Columbia basin of Washington state in 2003, 2004. He placed the seeds on damp paper towels in plastic bags in a refrigerator at 5 °C (41 °F) until roots appeared at four to six weeks. Then the seeds were planted in sterilized planting medium and sand and started daytime exposure in late February. Though he was still only able to achieve 60% survival at one year of age.
