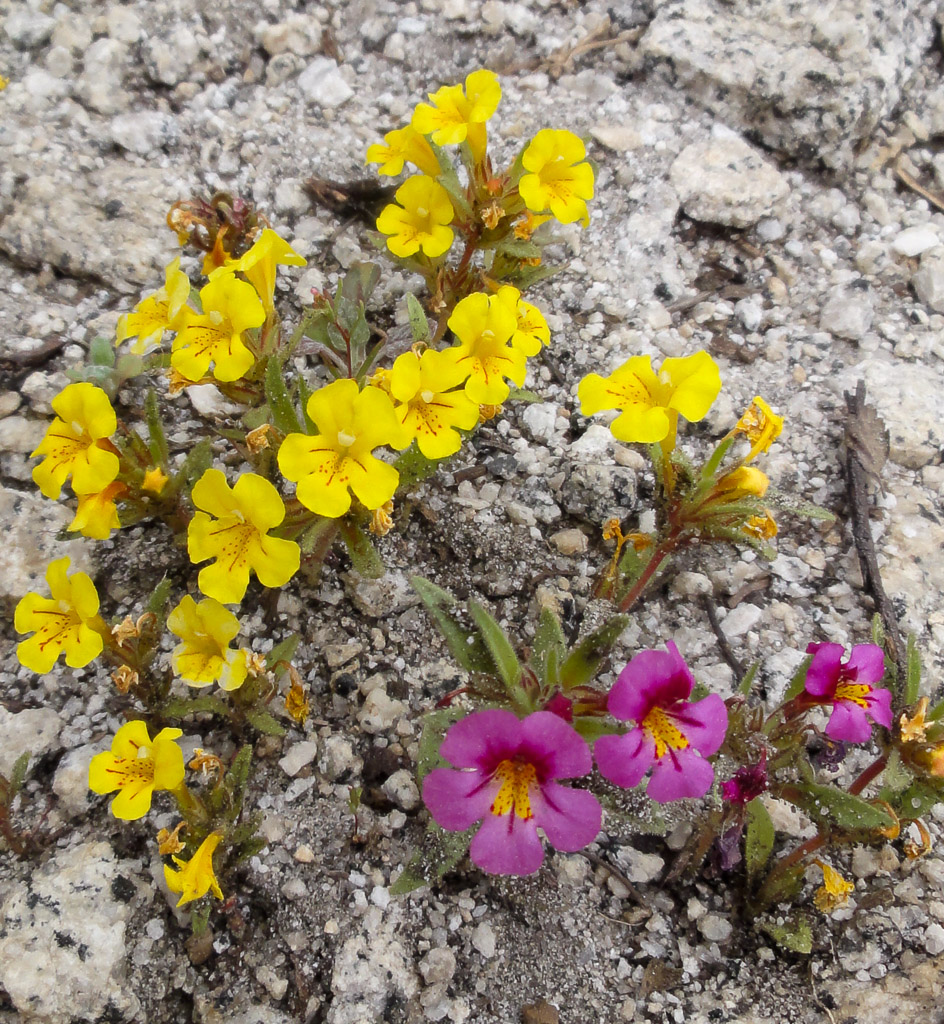

Conservation status
- Apparently Secure (NatureServe)

Scientific classification
- Kingdom: Plantae
- Clade: Embryophytes
- Clade: Tracheophytes
- Clade: Angiosperms
- Clade: Eudicots
- Clade: Asterids
- Order: Lamiales
- Family: Phrymaceae
- Genus: Diplacus
- Species: D. mephiticus

Binomial name
- Diplacus mephiticus (Greene) G.L.Nesom

Synonyms
- Eunanus angustifolius Greene; Eunanus mephiticus (Greene) Greene; Mimulus angustifolius (Greene) A.L.Grant; Mimulus coccineus Congdon; Mimulus coccineus var. wolfii (Eastw.) D.W.Taylor; Mimulus densus A.L.Grant; Mimulus mephiticus Greene; Mimulus stamineus A.L.Grant; Mimulus nanus var. mephiticus (Greene) D.M.Thomps.; Mimulus wolfii Eastw.

= Diplacus mephiticus =

Species of flowering plant

Diplacus mephiticus is a species of monkeyflower known by the common names skunky monkeyflower and foul odor monkeyflower. It was formerly known as Mimulus mephiticus.

== Description ==
Mimulus nanus var. mephiticus is a diminutive summer annual growing to a height of 15 cm (usually much smaller, especially at high elevation).

The oppositely arranged leaves are linear or lance-shaped and up to 3 centimeters in length. The leaves emit an unpleasant scent when crushed, the characteristic that earned the plant its name.

The trumpet-shaped flower may be up to 2 centimeters long and has an upper lip with two lobes and a lower lip with three. The flower is magenta or yellow, and populations occasionally have plants with both colors. The lower lip of the flower is marked with purplish lines and spots.

== Range and habitat ==
The species is native to the Sierra Nevada and western Great Basin of California and Nevada, including the Modoc Plateau, Warner Mountains, White Mountains, and Inyo Mountains. It grows in openings in sagebrush scrub and disturbed areas, typically on granite-derived soils, from 470 to 3,975 meters elevation.

== See also ==
- List of plants of the Sierra Nevada (U.S.)
- Flora of the Sierra Nevada (United States)
- Diplacus nanus
