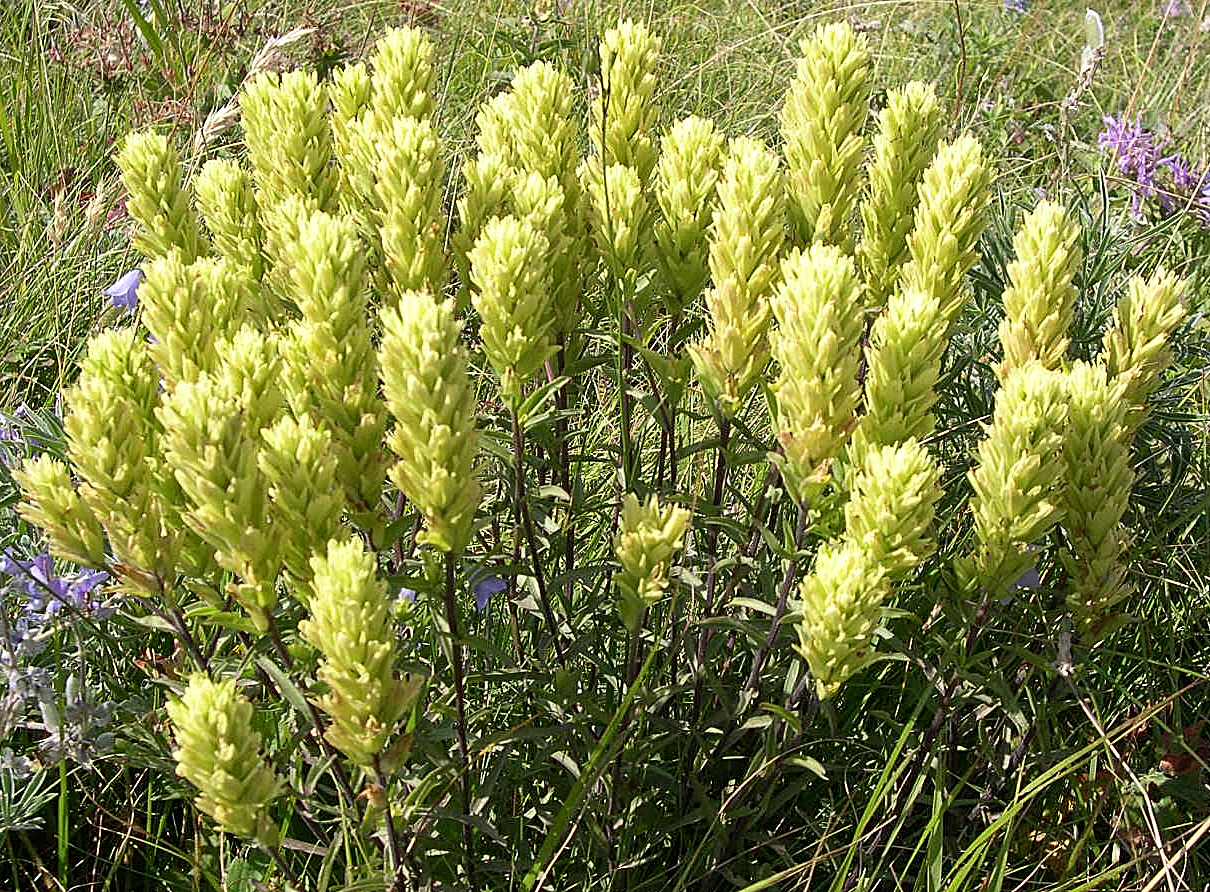

Conservation status
- Secure (NatureServe)

Scientific classification
- Kingdom: Plantae
- Clade: Tracheophytes
- Clade: Angiosperms
- Clade: Eudicots
- Clade: Asterids
- Order: Lamiales
- Family: Orobanchaceae
- Genus: Castilleja
- Species: C. occidentalis

Binomial name
- Castilleja occidentalis Torr.

= Castilleja occidentalis =

Plant species in the broomrape family

Castilleja occidentalis is a member of the genus Castilleja (paintbrush), commonly referred to as western paintbrush. Like other members, it is a hemi-parasite.

== Taxonomy ==
Castilleja occidentalis was named and scientifically described by John Torrey in 1827. He classified the species in the genus Castilleja within the family Orobanchaceae. It has no synonyms.

=== Names ===
The species was named Castilleja occidentalis, Botanical Latin for "western", because Torrey was under the impression that it has a wide western range. It is similarly known by the common names western paintbrush and western yellow paintbrush. It is also called alpine paintbrush, but it shares this name with Castilleja puberula. Other common names include yellow paintbrush and lemon paintbrush, but Castilleja septentrionalis is also known as yellow paintbrush.

== Distribution ==
This species has a wide distribution, from the Rocky Mountains north to BC, Alberta and Montana (Glacier National Park) and south to Utah and New Mexico (but not known in Wyoming or Idaho).

== Habitat ==
The western paintbrush occurs in areas above and below the treeline. It is found in dry places, favoring rocky soils and talus slopes. It has thin, lanceolate leaves (with occasionally lobed upper leaves) borne on woody stems. The bracts are pale yellow to nearly white. Along with the plants' habitat, this coloration aids identification.

However, this paintbrush often occurs in fragile wet meadows, where it is vulnerable to trampling. Further, coloration can vary to red and purple with all colors between.

== Associated plants ==
The western paintbrush is often associated with tufted hairgrass (Deschampsia caespitosa), golden avens (Geum rossii), and Bellard kobresia (Kobresia myosuroides)
