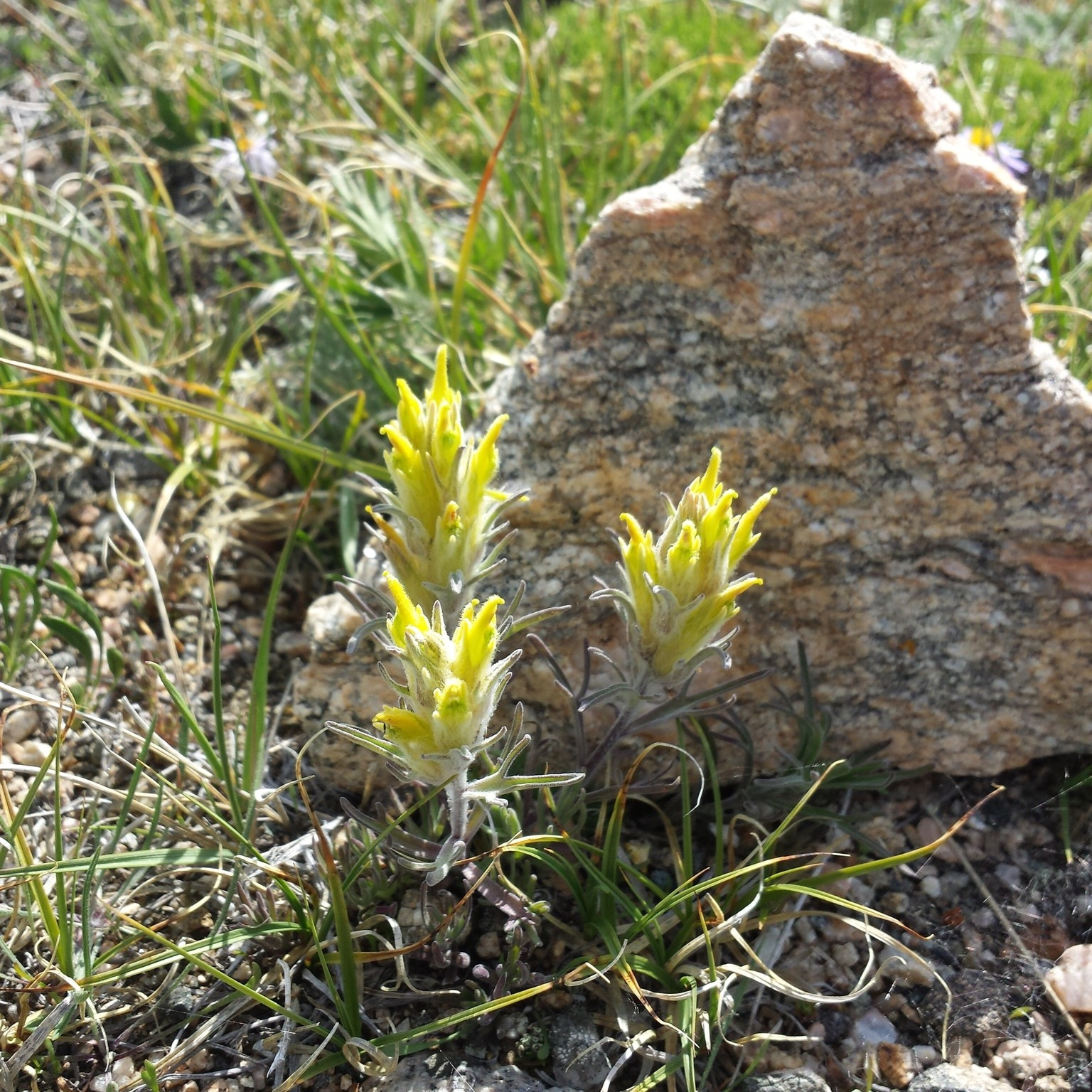
- Custer Gallatin National Forest, Montana

Scientific classification
- Kingdom: Plantae
- Clade: Tracheophytes
- Clade: Angiosperms
- Clade: Eudicots
- Clade: Asterids
- Order: Lamiales
- Family: Orobanchaceae
- Genus: Castilleja
- Species: C. nivea

Binomial name
- Castilleja nivea Pennell & Ownbey

= Castilleja nivea =

Plant species in the broomrape family

Castilleja nivea, the snow paintbrush or snowy paintbrush, is a rare species of alpine plant from northern Wyoming and southern Montana.

== Description ==
Snow paintbrush is small perennial plant that grows 5–16 centimeters (2–6 1/4 in) tall. Its stems sprout from a woody caudex atop a taproot. The stems rest on the ground at their base and then grow upwards or lean outwards. They will only have small, leafy side shoots growing from leaf bases and are covered in hairs, more densely towards the top and less thickly towards the base.

The leaves are gray due to a thick covering of hairs, but under this covering they are green to purple. They are narrow and grass-like to lanceolate, shaped like a spearhead, but only narrowly so and are 1–3.8 cm (1/2–1 1/2 in) long. They can have three lobes or be undivided and are not fleshy in texture.

The inflorescence is 2.5–6 cm (1–2 1/4 in) long and 1–2.5 cm (1/2–1 in) wide. The flowers are mostly covered by the 1.5–2.2 cm long mostly fused yellow sepals, sometimes the flower's beak and lower lip protruding out of them. The color of the sepals is difficult to see due to a thick covering of white hairs. The associated bracts are typically greenish or yellow-green, but might be a pale, dull purple. Most often the bracts are divided at the midpoint into three lobes, but might have five or none at all. The hidden flowers are 1.8–2.5 cm long with the tube just 3.5–5.5 millimeters and are mostly green.

== Taxonomy ==
Castilleja nivea is a species in the genus Castilleja classified within the wider Orobanchaceae family. It was scientifically described in 1950 by Francis W. Pennell and Francis Marion Ownbey. It has no subspecies or botanical synonyms. Pennell collected a specimen of the species on 2 August 1938 on the south side of Rock Creek Valley in the Beartooth Mountains in Montana. In 1946 Ownbey examined specimens collected by Charles Leo Hitchcock and Clarence V. Muhlick and identified it as a new species and contacted Pennell suggesting they write a paper about it, but work on publication was delayed for another four years.

=== Names ===
Castilleja nivea is known by the common names snow paintbrush and snowy paintbrush. It is also sometimes called snow Indian paintbrush.

== Range and habitat ==
Snow paintbrushes grow in a limited area of northwestern Wyoming and nearby Montana. In Wyoming they are recorded in Park County and Hot Springs County, but north of the border it is only found in Carbon County, Montana. Its grows on the mountains in Absaroka Range and the Beartooth Range. As of 1999 there were approximately 20 populations of the species in Wyoming with eight of them in protected wilderness areas.

The usual habitat for the species are slopes and flats with gravelly soils, fellfields, and grassy areas, mostly above timberline. It can be found at elevations of 1,700 to 3,600 meters (5,600–11,800 ft). West of Cody, Wyoming on Rattlesnake Mountain snow paintbrushes occasionally grow on limestone cliffs together with other plants that specialize in rocky calcareous habitats such as oneflower kelseya (Kelsey uniflora), Shoshonea (Shoshonea pulvinata), Jones' columbine (Aquilegia jonesii), and scented pussytoes (Antennaria aromatica).
