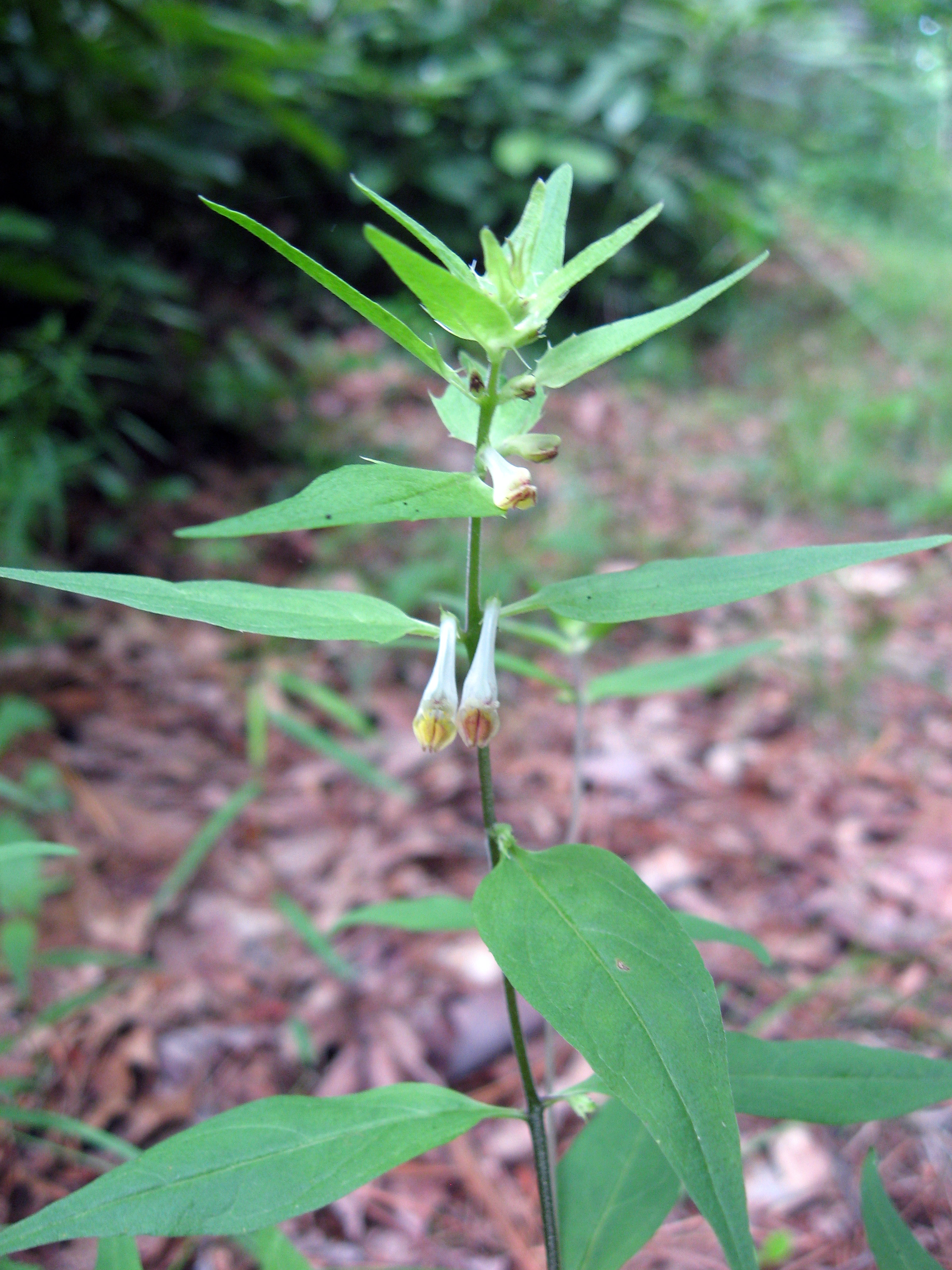

Scientific classification
- Kingdom: Plantae
- Clade: Tracheophytes
- Clade: Angiosperms
- Clade: Eudicots
- Clade: Asterids
- Order: Lamiales
- Family: Orobanchaceae
- Genus: Melampyrum
- Species: M. lineare

Binomial name
- Melampyrum lineare Desr.

= Melampyrum lineare =

Species of flowering plant

Melampyrum lineare, commonly called the narrowleaf cow wheat, is an herbaceous plant in the family Orobanchaceae. It is native to North America, where it is found in southern Canada and the northern United States, with an extension south in the Appalachian Mountains. It has a wide habitat tolerance, but is usually found in dry, acidic soil and somewhat exposed woodlands.

This species is hemiparasitic, meaning it receives energy from both photosynthesis and root parasitism. It is an herbaceous plant that grows in clumps about a 12 inches high. Its leaves are opposite and lanceolate to linear. It produces tubular cream-colored flowers in the summer. The seeds have elaisomes that attracts ants that act as seed dispersals.

== Taxonomy ==
Four varieties have been considered. However, recent studies have cast doubt at the distinctiveness of these varieties, and the study recommends no recognition of them. Researchers have suggested the proposed varieties represent adaptations to varying habitats, and are not reproductively isolated.

If recognized, the varieties are:

- M. lineare var. americanum - A northern taxon
- M. lineare var. latifolium - Native to dry outcrops in the Appalachian Mountains
- M. lineare var. lineare - Widespread in the northern United States and in southern Canada
- M. lineare var. pectinatum - Native to the eastern Coastal Plain, from Massachusetts to Virginia
