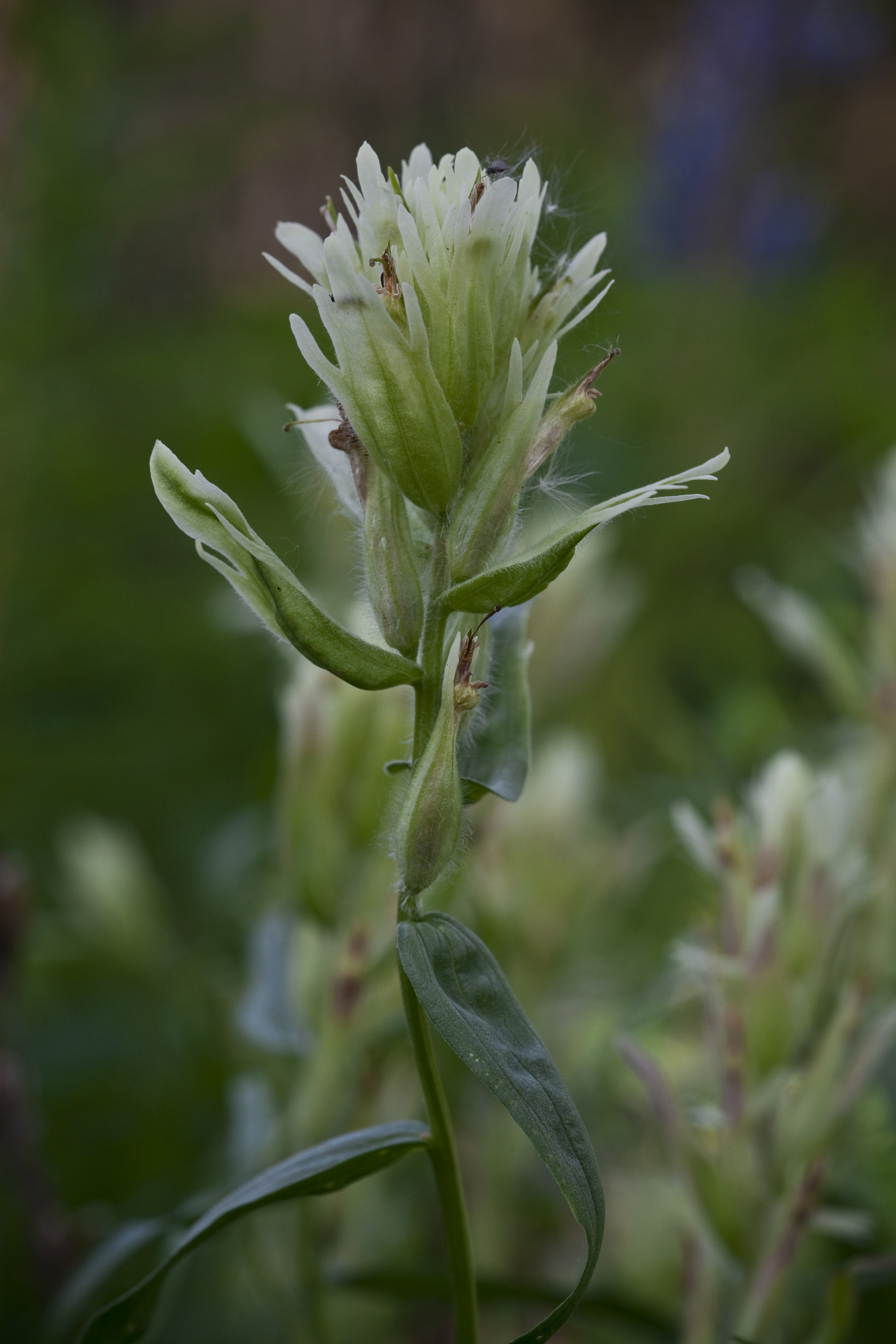
- Castilleja pallida var. caudata

Scientific classification
- Kingdom: Plantae
- Clade: Tracheophytes
- Clade: Angiosperms
- Clade: Eudicots
- Clade: Asterids
- Order: Lamiales
- Family: Orobanchaceae
- Genus: Castilleja
- Species: C. pallida

Binomial name
- Castilleja pallida (L.) Kunth

Varieties
- Castilleja pallida var. caudata (Pennell) B.Boivin; Castilleja pallida var. pallida; Castilleja pallida var. yukonis (Pennell) J.M.Egger

Synonyms
- List: Bartsia pallida L. (1753); Castilleja pallida subsp. typica Pennell (1934); Rhinanthus pallidus (L.) Lam. (1786)

= Castilleja pallida =

Species of paintbrush flower

Castilleja pallida, common name pale Indian paintbrush, is a plant species native to Alaska, Yukon, Northwest Territories, Nunavut, and across Russia to the Ural Mountains and Kazakhstan.

Castilleja pallida is an herb with a short taproot. The plant appears to be a facultative parasite, capable of surviving without draining nutrients from other plants but growing more healthy if it can draw sustenance from other plants. Stems can reach a height of 40 cm (16 inches). Leaves and stems tend to be hairless toward the bottom, finely hairy above, and bristly in the inflorescence. Leaves are narrowly lanceolate, tapering gradually toward the tip. The inflorescence has 5-12 flowers, the flowers greenish-yellow each with a greenish-yellow to cream-colored bract below.
