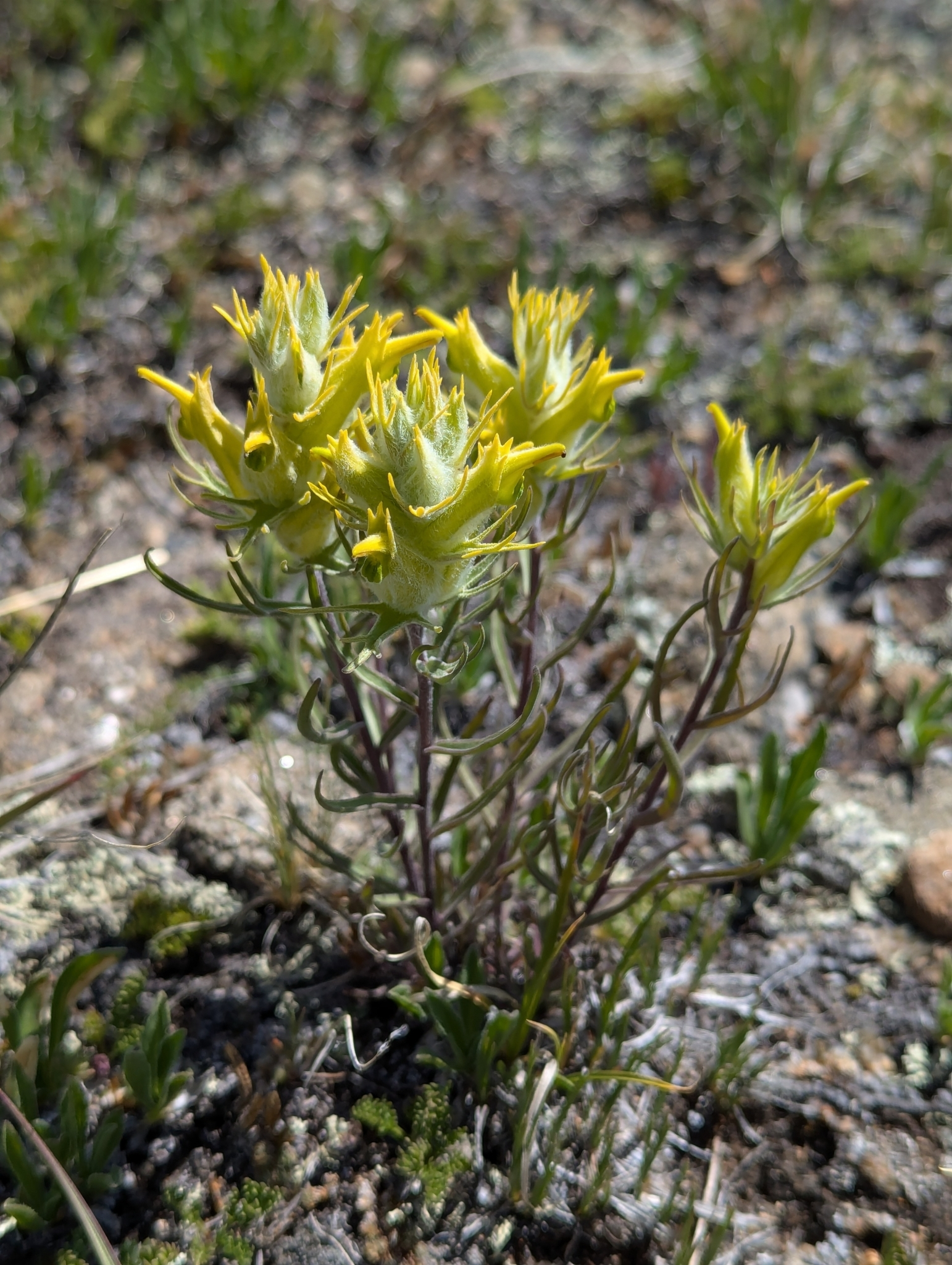
- On the astern side of Mount Bross in the Mosquito Range

Conservation status
- Vulnerable (NatureServe)

Scientific classification
- Kingdom: Plantae
- Clade: Embryophytes
- Clade: Tracheophytes
- Clade: Spermatophytes
- Clade: Angiosperms
- Clade: Eudicots
- Clade: Asterids
- Order: Lamiales
- Family: Orobanchaceae
- Genus: Castilleja
- Species: C. puberula

Binomial name
- Castilleja puberula Rydb.

Synonyms
- Castilleja flavoviridis

= Castilleja puberula =

Plant species in the broomrape family

Castilleja puberula, commonly alpine paintbrush or short-flowered paintbrush, is a plant species in the broomrape family that grows exclusively in high elevation habitats. Before 2014 it was thought to only grow in Colorado in mountains near the Great Divide, but an additional population was located on a mountain in southwest Montana.

== Description ==
The alpine paintbrush is a plant that is 8 to 15 centimeters (3–6 in) when full grown. It has a taproot topped by a woody caudex that sprouts multiple stems that grow straight upwards or lean outwards from the plant's crown and are usually unbranched. The above ground parts are covered in covered in small, soft hairs.

The leaves are small and narrow, just 2–3.3 cm long, and resembling a blade of grass to linear-lanceolate in shape, like a very narrow spear head with the widest part below the midpoint. They can be unlobed or have as many as five lobes, though usually no more than three. When leaves have lobes they spread wide or very widely and have narrow points. Leaves lower down on the stem tend to lack lobes whilte those higher on a stem are more likely to have them. Their color ranges from green to purple and they are not fleshy in texture.

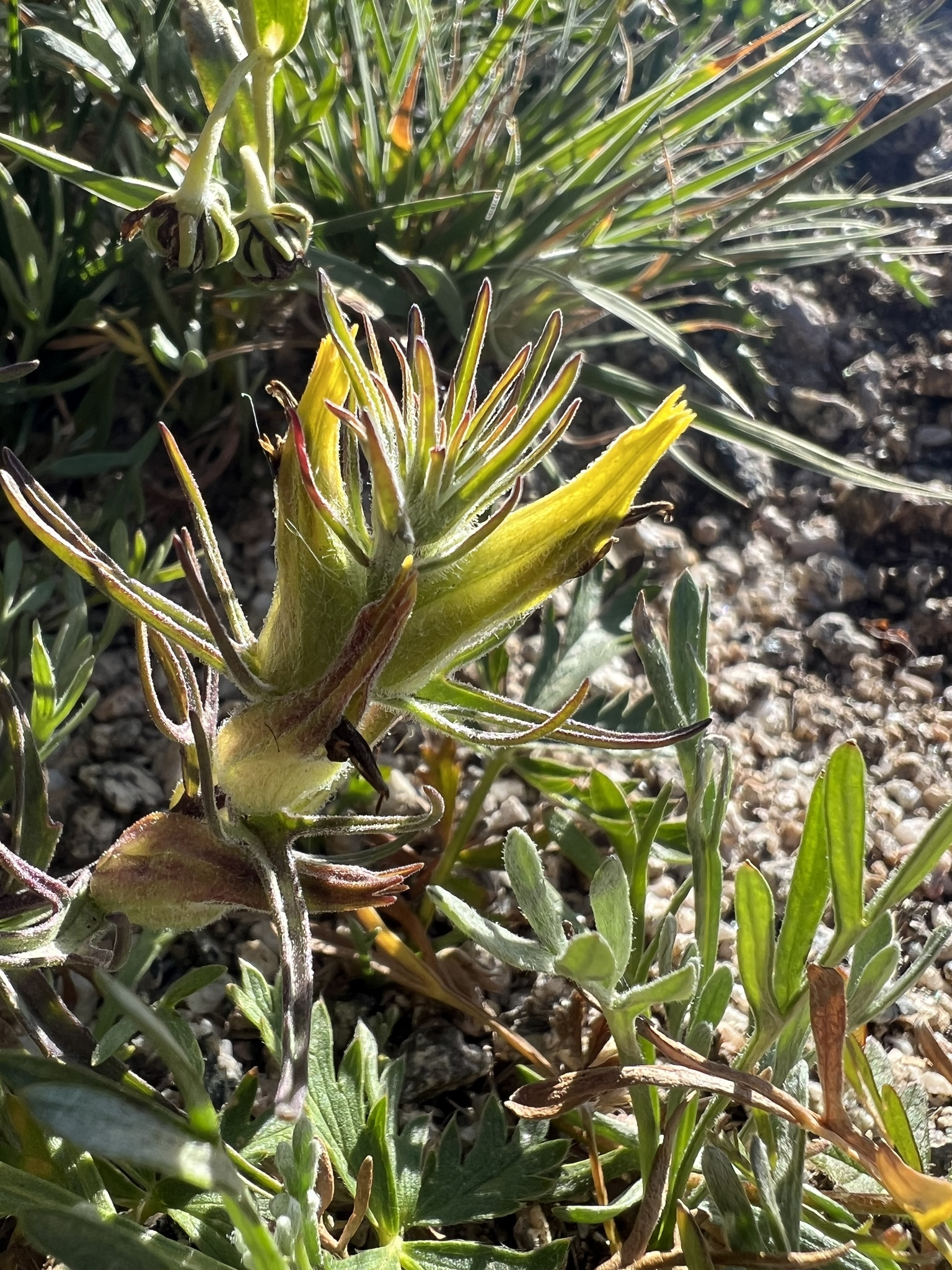
Small plant near the top of the Mount Blue Sky Scenic Byway

The inflorescence is on the upper part of each stem measuring 4 to 5 cm long and 1.5 to 2.5 cm in diameter. The flowers are not very noticeable, the bracts are always green at the base, but can range from yellow to green on the upper part and might be touched with yellow-orange at the tip. Bracts are somewhat wider than the leaves, lanceolate to linear-lanceolate in shape, with as many as seven spreading, thready lobes, though usually five or fewer.

The flowers are tube shaped with a beak that extends out from behind the bracts and are 1.8–2.1 cm long overall. They are yellow to yellow-green and usually bloom in July or August, but can rarely be found blooming as early as February.

== Taxonomy ==
Castilleja puberula was scientifically described and named by Per Axel Rydberg in 1904. It is classified in the family Orobanchaceae, along with the rest of genus Castilleja. It has one heterotypic synonym, Castilleja flavoviridis described and named in 1929 by Leon Hugh Kelso. It is very similar to Castilleja flava and probably evolved from it to live in its present high altitude habitat. One instance of hybridization with sulfur paintbrush (Castilleja septentrionalis) has been documented in Clear Creek County, Colorado.

=== Names ===
Is species name, puberula, means covered in short, downy hairs in Botanical Latin. Castilleja puberula is known by the common name alpine paintbrush, however both Castilleja rhexiifolia and Castilleja septentrionalis are sometimes called this. It is also called the short-flowered paintbrush.

== Range and habitat ==
Most of the known range of the alpine paintbrush is in north-central Colorado near the North American Continental Divide. It has been recorded in six Colorado counties from south to north including Park, Summit, Clear Creek, Grand, Boulder, and Larimer. Until 2014 the presence of alpine paintbrush on the Montanan side of Mount Jefferson was not recognized, despite the species having been previously collected by a botanist in 2004. The wide gap of nearly 600 kilometers between the Coloradan population and the Montanan population suggests there may be additional populations in Wyoming in similar habitats.

Alpine paintbrush grows at elevations of 2,700 to 3,900 meters (8,900–12,800 ft) in the subalpine and alpine tundra. It grows in moist meadows, along streams, and on moderately moist rocky slopes. It also has a preference for soils containing limestone. Though spread out over 3,529 square kilometers (1,363 sq mi) in Colorado, the size of its habitat may be just 143 hectares (354 acres).

=== Conservation ===
When Castilleja puberula was evaluated by NatureServe in 2019 they rated it as vulnerable both at the global level (G3) and at the state level (S3) in Colorado. Because it its high altitude habitat is mainly public lands and difficult to access it has few threats other than damage from off-road vehicles. There are 30 known populations in Colorado and one more in Montana. At one location in Colorado an old mining road cuts across the area where it grows and this location receives heavy use by recreational vehicles. The species is somewhat threatened by climate change with a moderate capacity to adapt to changing conditions.
