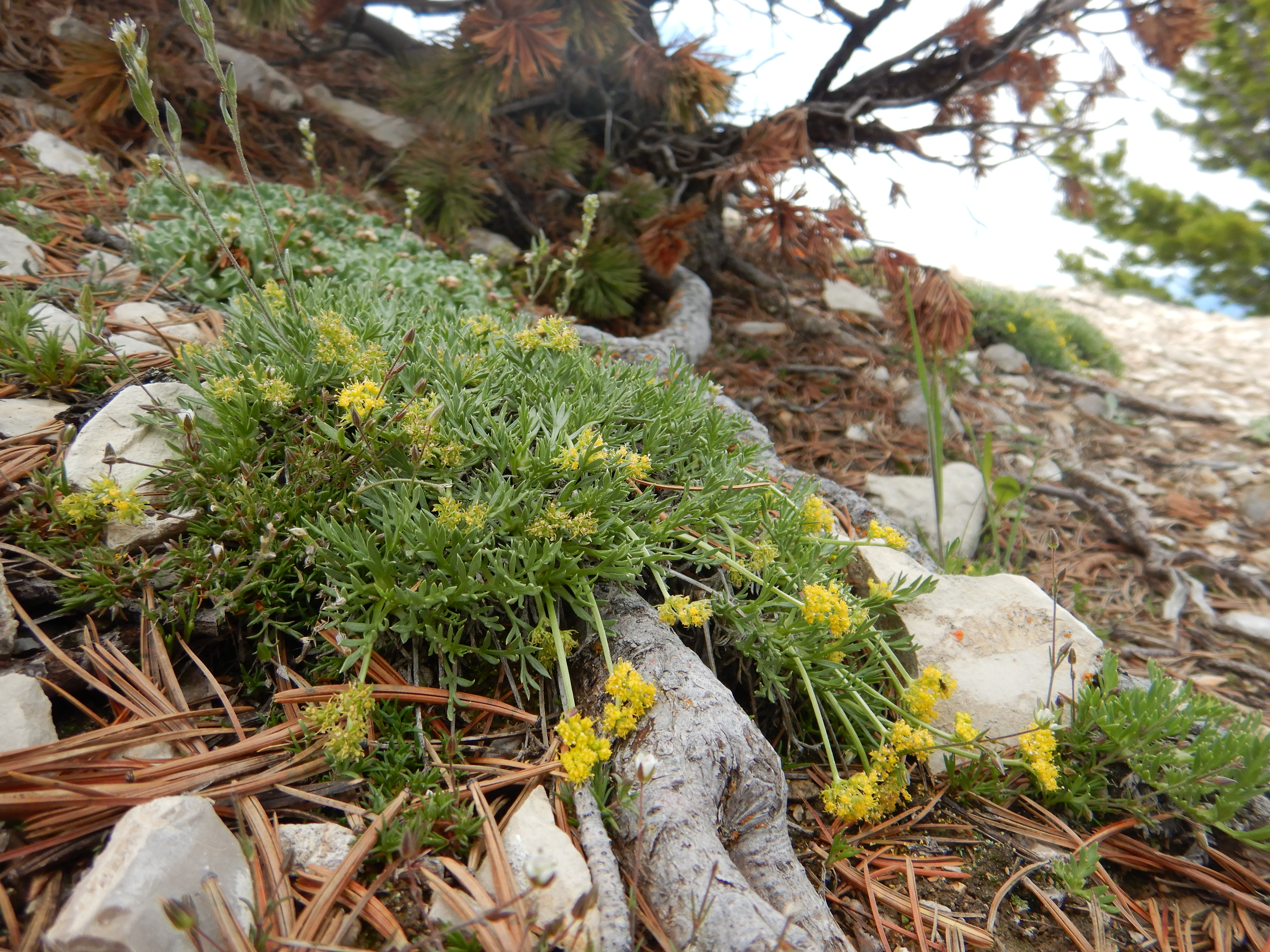
- On Heart Mountain, Wyoming

Conservation status
- Vulnerable (NatureServe)

Scientific classification
- Kingdom: Plantae
- Clade: Tracheophytes
- Clade: Angiosperms
- Clade: Eudicots
- Clade: Asterids
- Order: Apiales
- Family: Apiaceae
- Subfamily: Apioideae
- Tribe: Selineae
- Genus: Shoshonea; Evert & Constance
- Species: S. pulvinata

Binomial name
- Shoshonea pulvinata Evert & Constance

= Shoshonea =

Genus of plants

Shoshonea is a monotypic genus of flowering plants belonging to the parsley family; its sole species is Shoshonea pulvinata. Its native range is Western Central USA.

== Description ==
Shoshonea plants are low growing plants without a main stem. They grow as a tuft of leaves that are pulvinate, having a swollen base to the leaf stalk allowing it to move without growing. The plants are quite small, only reaching 2 to 8 centimeters (3/4–3 1/4 in) in height. It is a perennial that sprouts from a woody taproot and a caudex which is usually branched underground.

== Taxonomy ==
The genus Shoshonea and its one species Shoshonea pulvinata were scientifically described and named in 1982 by Erwin F. Evert and Lincoln Constance. It is further classified in the family Apiaceae. It has no synonyms or subspecies.

=== Names ===
The genus was named Shoshonea for the Shoshone River that flows nearby in northwestern Wyoming. The genus name is also used as a common name for the species. Although the species does not much resemble the garden carrot in either its above ground or below ground parts, it is given the common name Shoshone carrot in the Natural Resources Conservation Service database.
