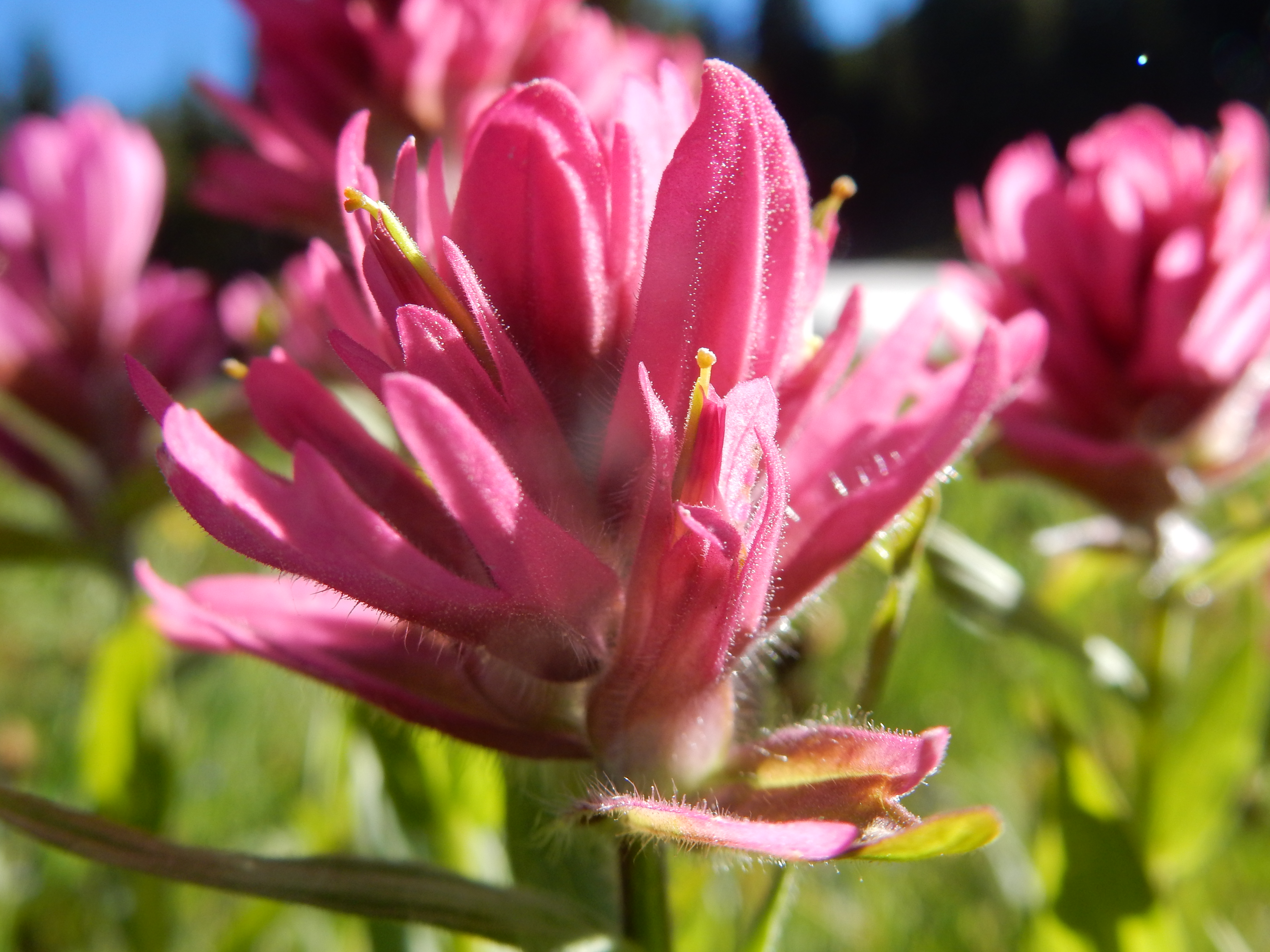

Conservation status
- Secure (NatureServe)

Scientific classification
- Kingdom: Plantae
- Clade: Embryophytes
- Clade: Tracheophytes
- Clade: Spermatophytes
- Clade: Angiosperms
- Clade: Eudicots
- Clade: Asterids
- Order: Lamiales
- Family: Orobanchaceae
- Genus: Castilleja
- Species: C. rhexiifolia

Binomial name
- Castilleja rhexiifolia Rydb.

Synonyms
- List: Castilleja humilis; Castilleja lanceifolia; Castilleja lauta; Castilleja leonardii; Castilleja magna; Castilleja obtusiloba; Castilleja oregonensis; Castilleja purpurascens; Castilleja subpurpurascens

= Castilleja rhexiifolia =

Plant species in the broomrape family

Castilleja rhexiifolia, commonly called rosy paintbrush, subalpine paintbrush, or rhexia-leaved paintbrush, is a species of plant in Orobanchaceae, commonly known as the broomrape family. They are a common flower found in moist habitats near or above timberline in the Rocky Mountains and the Pacific Northwest. Like most members of the Castilleja genus, they are partially parasitic plants.

== Description ==
Castilleja rhexiifolia is a perennial plant that may be 10–80 centimeters tall when full grown, but is more often 25–60 centimeters. They have a taproot which has a woody structure at its top where the herbaceous stems regrow each year (a caudex).

Each plant may have a few or several stems that will either grow up straight from the base of the plant or grow outwards slightly before curving and growing upwards (erect or ascending). Most stems are unbranched, but occasionally they will branch. Towards the base the stems are smooth or almost smooth and hair free (glabrous to glabrate) and sparsely covered in long, soft hairs towards their ends, sometimes with gland tipped hairs (stipitate-glandular).

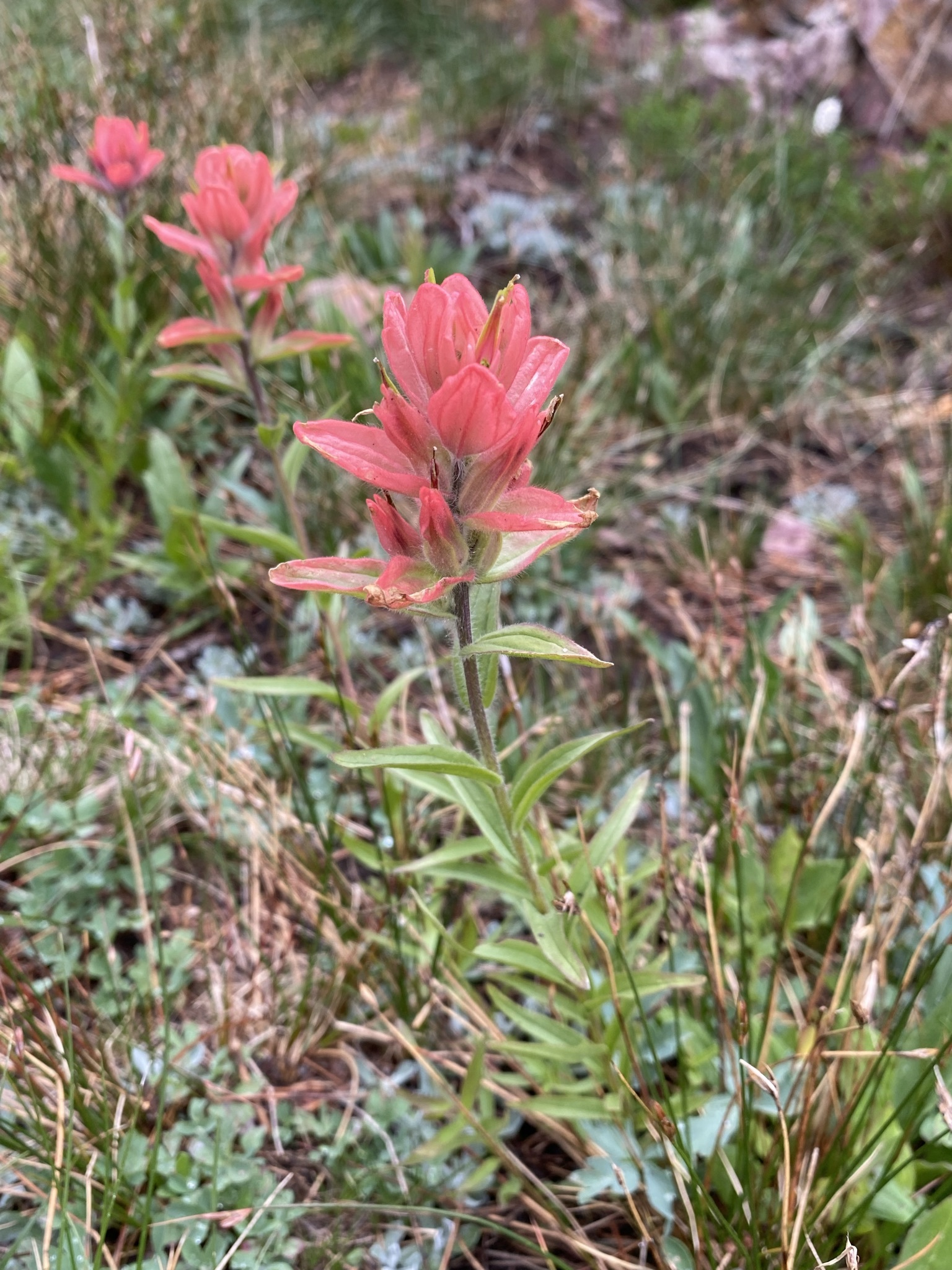
Castilleja rhexiifolia blooming Murdock Mountain, Utah

The leaves of Castilleja rhexiifolia may be green or somewhat tinted purple. They are variable in shape, narrow like the leaves of grass (linear leaves), a narrow or broad spear head shape wider in the middle and tapered towards the ends (lanceolate leaves), as somewhat rounded rectangle (oblong leaves), or shaped like an egg (ovate leaves) and are usually 3–6 centimeters long, occasionally reaching seven centimeters. The leaves are thin, not fleshy, with three quite visible veins, and are flat or slightly rolled inward (involute). The ends of the leaves may have three lobes or no lobes, usually with narrow points, and when present the side lobes are narrower than the central one. The bracts may be covered sparsely or densely with hairs with a slightly sticky texture (viscid-pilose).

Castilleja rhexiifolia has relatively large showy inflorescences, 2.5–15 centimeters long and 1.5–4.5 centimeters wide, with large brightly colored modified leaves (bracts) surrounding the flower that may be pink-purple, red-purple, purple, or crimson. More rarely they may be a pale reddish, yellowish, or white. Usually the bracts are the same color from base to tip, but occasionally they will be greenish, a dull brown-purple, or deep purple near the base with any of the other colors on the rest of the bract. The modified leaves have a similar shape to the photosynthetic leaves, broad spear head shaped, egg shaped, or with a teardrop shape with the broadest part towards the end (obovate). They may have no lobes at the end of the bracts or as many as seven, but most commonly 3–5 lobes that form past the mid-point of the bract. The central lobe will have a blunt and broad point, while the ones to the side will be more sharply rounded and only sometimes rounded.

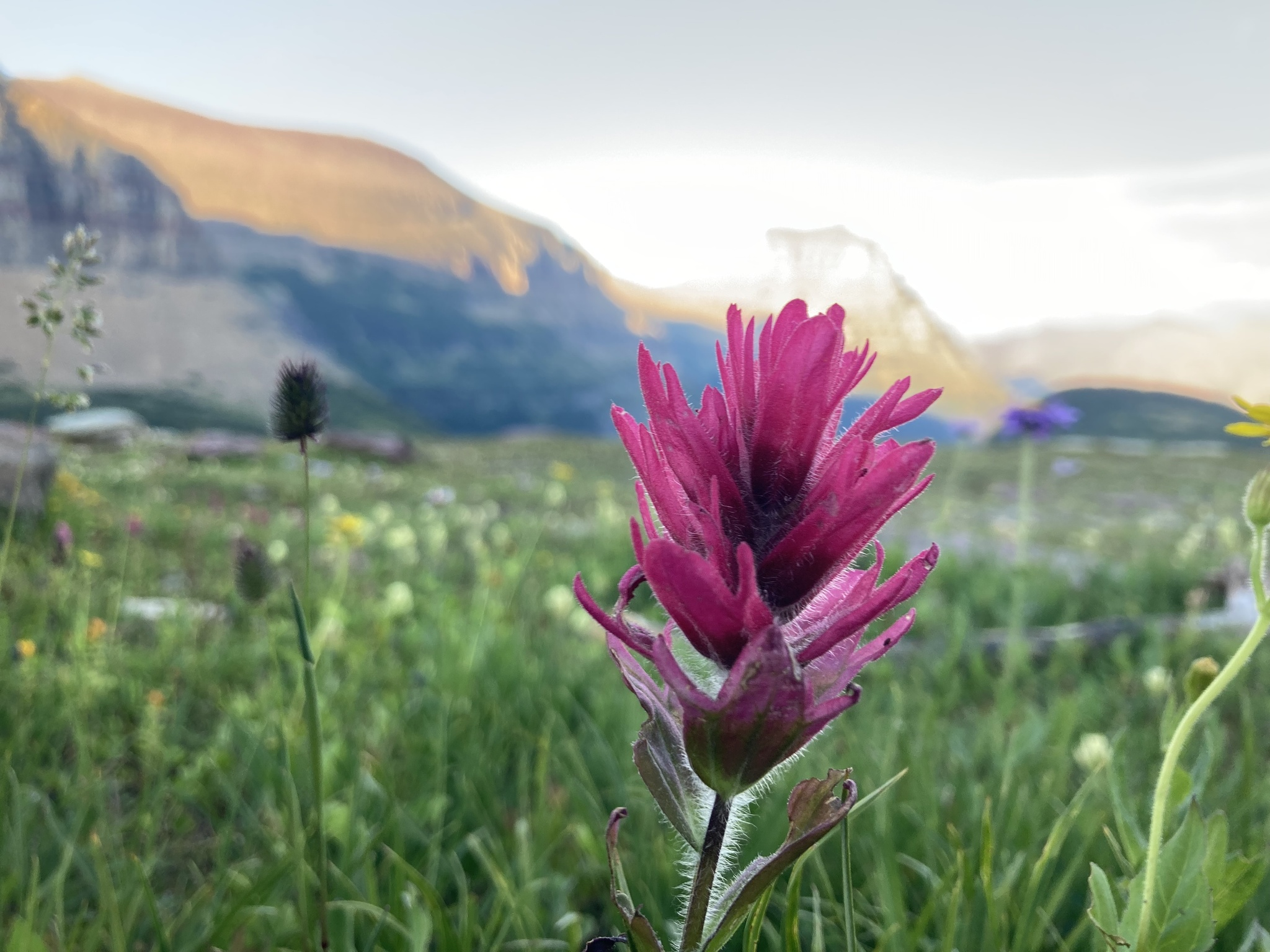
Castilleja rhexiifolia blooming in Glacier National Park (Mont.)

The sepals are united into a tube (a calyx) which almost entirely conceals the flower and has the same bright color as the bracts with green, purplish, or whitish coloration at the base. The sepals are 15–25 millimeters in length with divisions towards the ends that are 40–50% of the length at the top and bottom (abaxial and adaxial) and 15–30% of the length at the sides. The lobes formed by these clefts are oblong to triangular in shape, usually with blunt or rounded ends. The petals (corolla) of Castilleja rhexiifolia are united into a tube for much of their length, but they are almost entirely concealed within the sepals. The corolla is straight and 15–36 millimeters long, though usually shorter than 30 millimeters. The tube portion can range from 11 to 24 millimeters in length, though more often is 12–24 millimeters. The top of the corolla splits into a beak that protrudes from the sepals and is about 7–12 millimeters long, about 1/3 the length of the corolla. The lower lip of the corolla is deep green and smaller, 1–3 millimeters. The lower lip has three small lobes commonly called "teeth" 0.5–2 millimeters long that curve inwards. Overall the petals are green, yellow, or slightly red colored.

In its native range it flowers from May through September, with occasional blooms as early as March. The fruit is a capsule around 12 millimeters long.

Castilleja rhexiifolia is most often confused with Castilleja miniata, another similarly colored paintbrush flower that somewhat overlaps in habitat and range with it. It may also be confused with Hayden's paintbrush (Castilleja haydenii), another similarly colored high altitude species, but C. rehexiifolia is typically taller and the majority of the leaves are without lobes or have three lobes at most, while C. haydenii has typically has three or more.

== Taxonomy ==
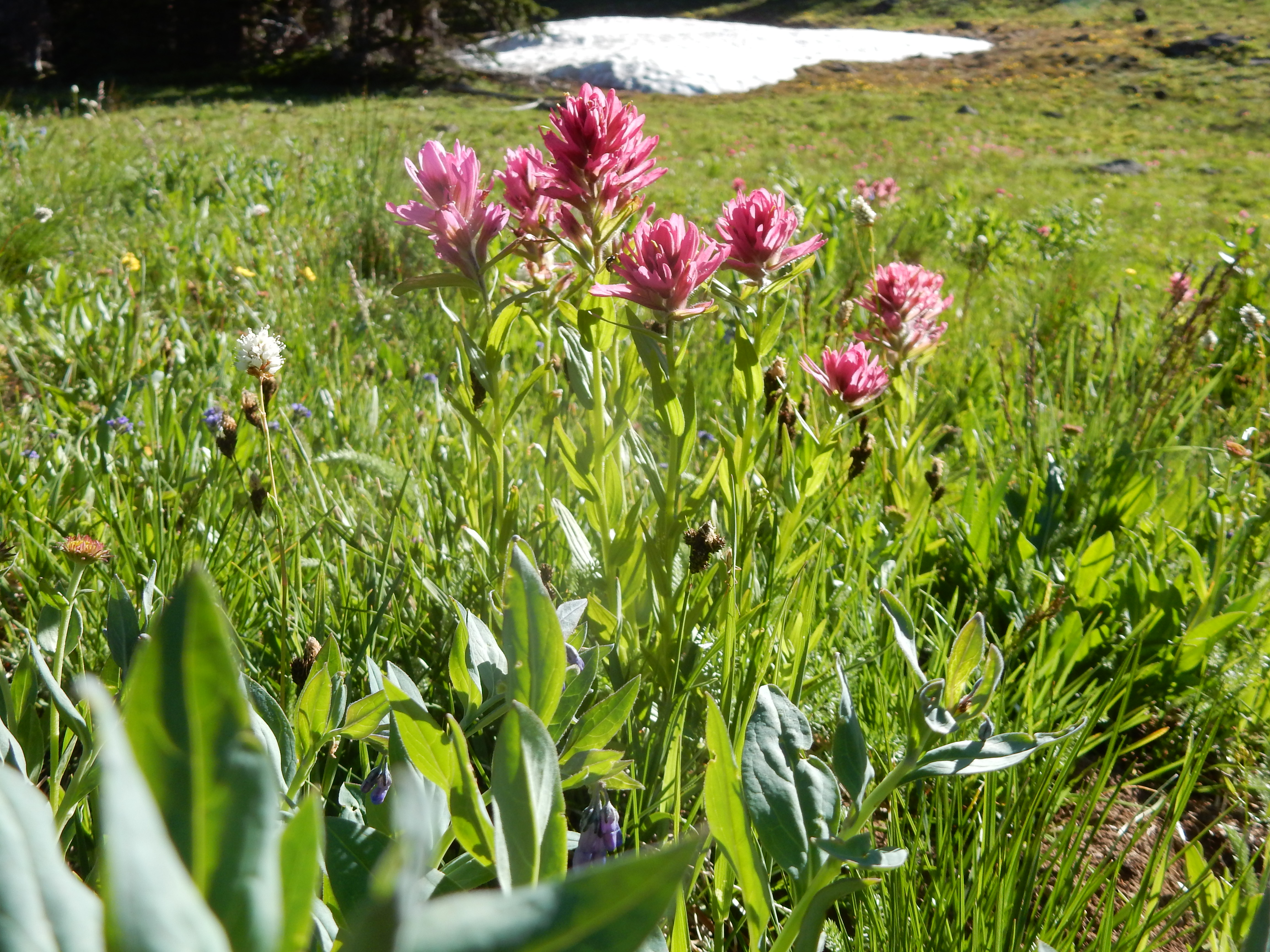
Castilleja rhexiifolia in Mount Blackmore cirque with bracts and calyces with more of a pinkish than purplish pigment.

Castilleja rhexiifolia was scientifically described and named by the botanist Per Axel Rydberg in the year 1900. However, he spelled the new species "rhexifolia" with one "i". Rydberg thought that C. rhexiifolia had been previously confused with Castilleja miniata. Though there has not been any dispute of its placement in genus Castilleja or its status as a species, Rydberg and other botanists also published nine other species of Castilleja that are heterotypic synonyms of Castilleja rhexiifolia.

Table of Synonyms
Name	Year	Notes
Castilleja humilis Rydb.	1907	
Castilleja lanceifolia Rydb.	1900	
Castilleja lauta A.Nelson	1900	
Castilleja leonardii Rydb.	1907	
Castilleja magna Rydb.	1907	
Castilleja obtusiloba Rydb.	1904	
Castilleja oregonensis Gand.	1919	
Castilleja purpurascens Rydb.	1907	nom. illeg.
Castilleja subpurpurascens Rydb.	1917	

The taxonomy of species in Castilleja can be confused by the frequency of hybrids between species. Castilleja rhexiifolia, like many other paintbrushes, has different numbers of chromosomes across its range. The base number of chromosomes is 12, with tetraploid (24) and octaploid (48) populations having been documented. Even when there is a mismatch it may produce viable hybrids with Castilleja sulphurea or Castilleja miniata.

=== Names ===
The species name, rhexiifolia, means with leaves like Rhexia, the flowers commonly called deer grass. When combining Rhexia with folia Rydberg just dropped the "a", but this is no longer considered proper usage. Since about 2005 Castilleja rhexiifolia with a second "i" replacing the "a" is the preferred spelling in used in most botanical sources. Like Rhexia the paintbrush has three prominent veins in its leaves. Common names for Castilleja rhexiifolia include rosy paintbrush, alpine paintbrush, alpine red paintbrush, subalpine paintbrush, splitleaf paintbrush, splitleaf painted-cup, or rhexia-leaved paintbrush. However, the name alpine paintbrush is also applied to Castilleja puberula and Castilleja septentrionalis.

== Distribution and habitat ==
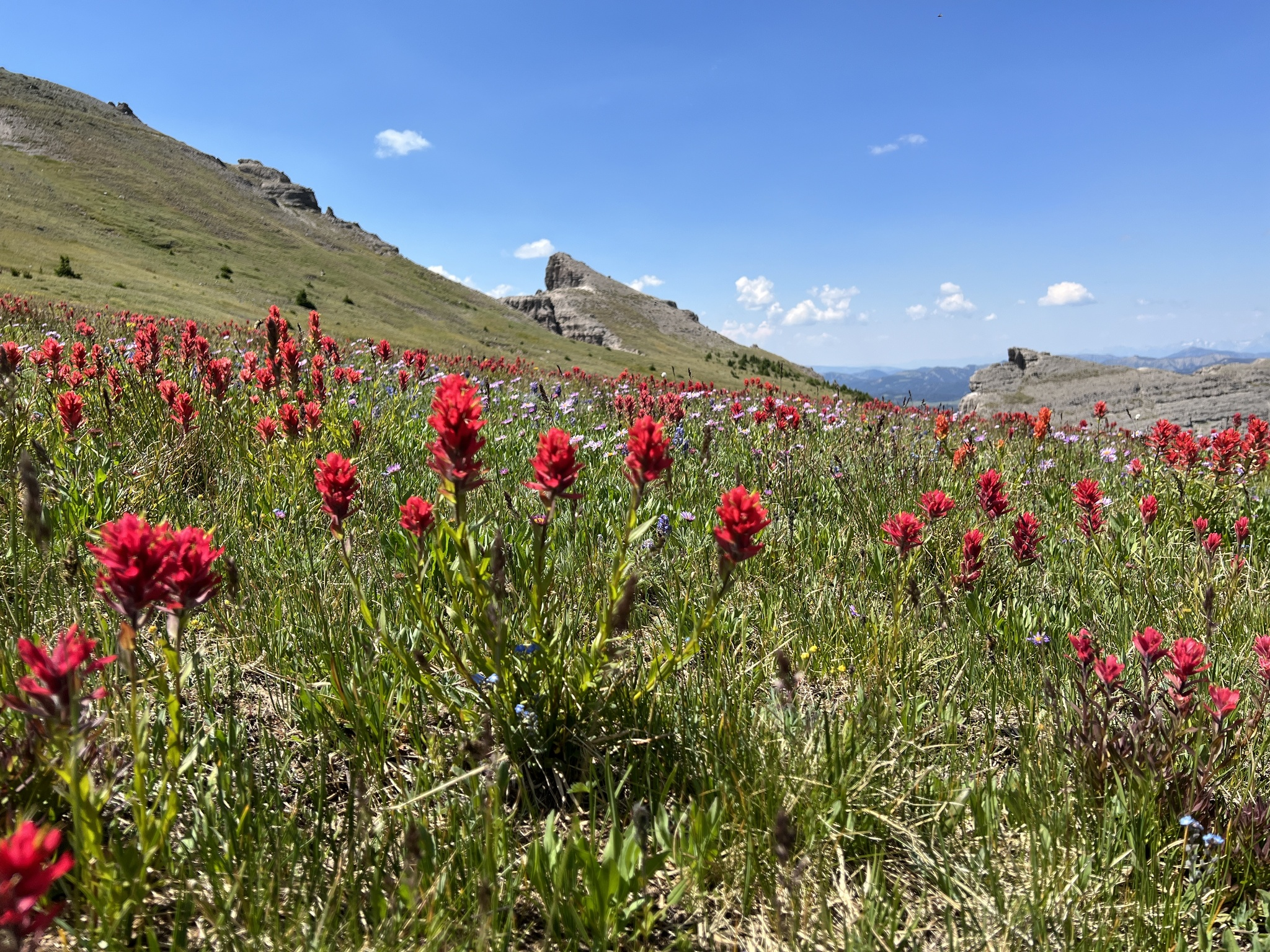
Castilleja rhexiifolia blooming in an alpine meadow Bridger-Teton National Forest, Wyoming

Castilleja rhexiifolia is native to North America and is found in mountainous areas from New Mexico northward in the Rocky Mountains to Alberta. To the west it continues into the Cascade Mountains in British Columbia, Washington State, and Oregon. Other states where it is known to grow include Idaho, Montana, Nevada, Utah, Wyoming, and Colorado.

Castilleja rhexiifolia is found in subalpine meadows, particularly in wet meadows, near the edges of ponds, and amid the krummholz. Their habitat extends above timberline into wet areas of the mountain tundra. The altitude range for the species is from 1800 to 4000 meters in elevation.

== Ecology ==
As with the majority of plants in its genus Castilleja rhexiifolia is a hemiparasite. It makes root connections with Festuca brachyphylla, Geum rossi, and Sibbaldia procumbens and may use other species as hosts. Castilleja rhexiifolia is a host of the rust species Cronartium coleosporioides (pine cow wheat rust) which also attacks a wide variety of pine species in North America.

=== Conservation ===
Castilleja rhexiifolia was evaluated in 2016 by NatureServe with a status of secure (G5) globally. At the state or provincial level they also rated it as secure in British Columbia (S5). In Montana, Wyoming, and New Mexico they rate it as apparently secure (S4). In Alberta it is listed as vulnerable (S3) and in Nevada it is critically imperiled (S1). The rest of its range as not been rated.

== Uses ==
Alpine paintbrush was evaluated for potential for cultivation as a garden ornamental, but was found to have a very low germination rate in greenhouse conditions and was not evaluated further. A similar result was found in another study trying to determine the gemination requirements of the species. Only 3% of seed germinated when given a warm to cold treatment of 21 °C to 4 °C and none at all when given an additional warm to cold cycle.
