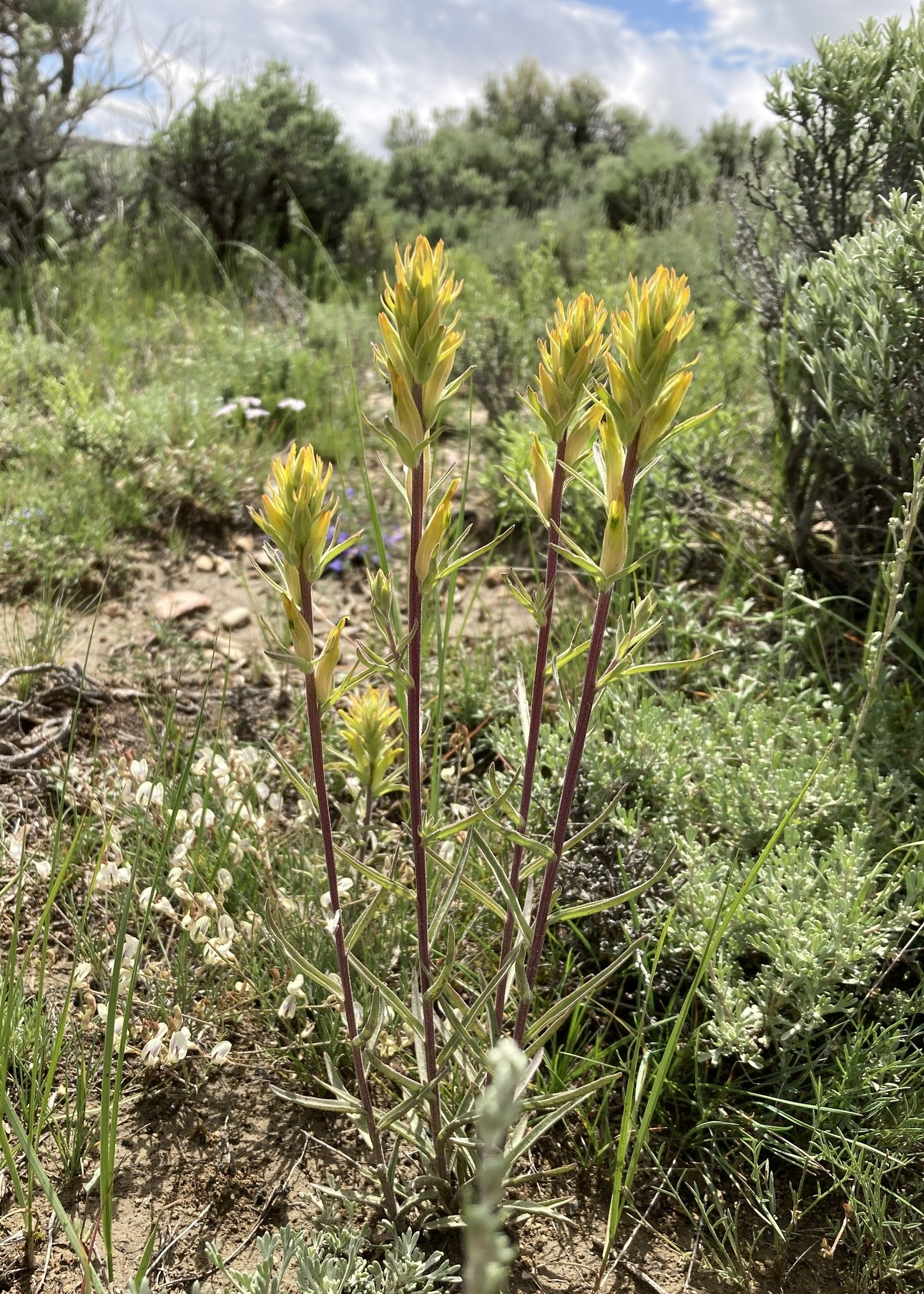
- Lincoln County, Wyoming

Conservation status
- Apparently Secure (NatureServe)

Scientific classification
- Kingdom: Plantae
- Clade: Tracheophytes
- Clade: Angiosperms
- Clade: Eudicots
- Clade: Asterids
- Order: Lamiales
- Family: Orobanchaceae
- Genus: Castilleja
- Species: C. flava

Binomial name
- Castilleja flava S.Watson

Varieties
- C. f. var. flava; C. f. var. rustica

Synonyms
- List: Castilleja brachyantha; Castilleja breviflora; Castilleja curticalix; Castilleja elkoensis; Castilleja linoides; Castilleja pecten; Castilleja rustica

= Castilleja flava =

Plant species in the broomrape family

Castilleja flava, the yellow paintbrush, is a species of paintbrush flower native to the western United States. It is strongly associated with bushy species of sagebrush.

== Description ==
Yellow paintbrush is a perennial plant that grows flowering stems that are usually 15 to 55 centimeters (6–22 in), but that occasionally reach heights of 75 cm (30 in). The stems grow straight upwards or lean outwards from the crown and usually branch in the upper parts with several in a cluster, though they can be unbranched. They are rarely hairless except in northeast Nevada, more usually they are covered in backwards pointing hairs giving them an ash color. The stems grow from a woody caudex atop a taproot.

They leaves are narrowly lanceolate to narrowly oblong in shape and measure 1–6.7 cm long. They are usually somewhat purple or gray in color with a wavy edge or one that rolls inward. Leaves may lack lobes, but more often they have three or five deep spreading lobes and occasionally as many as seven. Lower leaves more frequently lack lobes than upper ones.

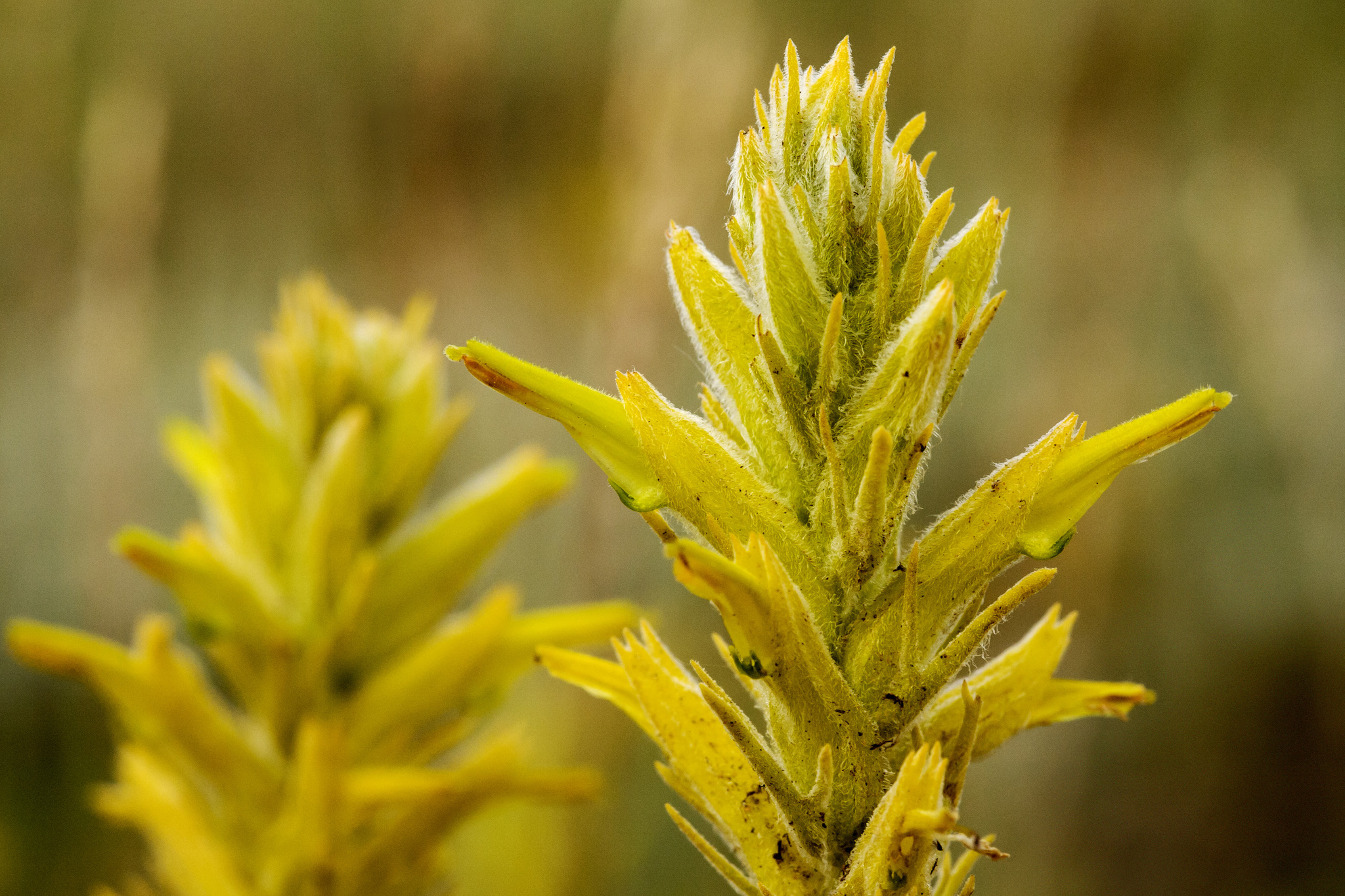
Inflorescence with strongly colored sepals and protruding yellow flowers

The inflorescence is normally yellow, but may be somewhat orange or reddish, and is covered in long, soft-hairs that can be curly or matted; it measures 3.5–29 cm, though rarely more than 20 cm. The bracts usually have three or five lobes and are slightly wider than the leaves. The mostly fused sepals are 1.1–2.8 cm long with a longer cuts on the font and back than on the sides. The green to yellow flower can extend out of the sepals slightly or substantially.

The fruit of the yellow paintbrush is a capsule that measures 0.8–1.5 cm long.

== Taxonomy ==
Castilleja flava was scientifically described and named in 1871 by the botanist Sereno Watson. It is part of the genus Castilleja which is classified in the Orobanchaceae family. It has two accepted varieties:

- Castilleja flava var. flava
  Widespread in the western interior United States
- Castilleja flava var. rustica
  Native to just Oregon, Idaho, and Montana

Castilleja flava has eight synonyms, seven of variety flava and one of variety rustica.

Table of Synonyms
Name	Year	Rank	Synonym of:	Notes
Castilleja brachyantha Rydb.	1900	species	var. flava	= het.
Castilleja brachyantha var. subinflata E.H.Kelso	1935	variety	var. flava	= het.
Castilleja breviflora A.Gray	1862	species	var. flava	= het.
Castilleja curticalix A.Nelson & J.F.Macbr.	1913	species	var. flava	= het.
Castilleja elkoensis Edwin	1959	species	var. flava	= het.
Castilleja linoides A.Gray	1878	species	var. flava	= het.
Castilleja pecten Rydb.	1907	species	var. flava	= het.
Castilleja rustica Piper	1900	species	var. rustica	≡ hom.
Notes: ≡ homotypic synonym; = heterotypic synonym

=== Names ===
Castilleja flava is known by the common name of yellow paintbrush. The variety rustica is known as rustic paintbrush or rural paintbrush.

== Range and habitat ==
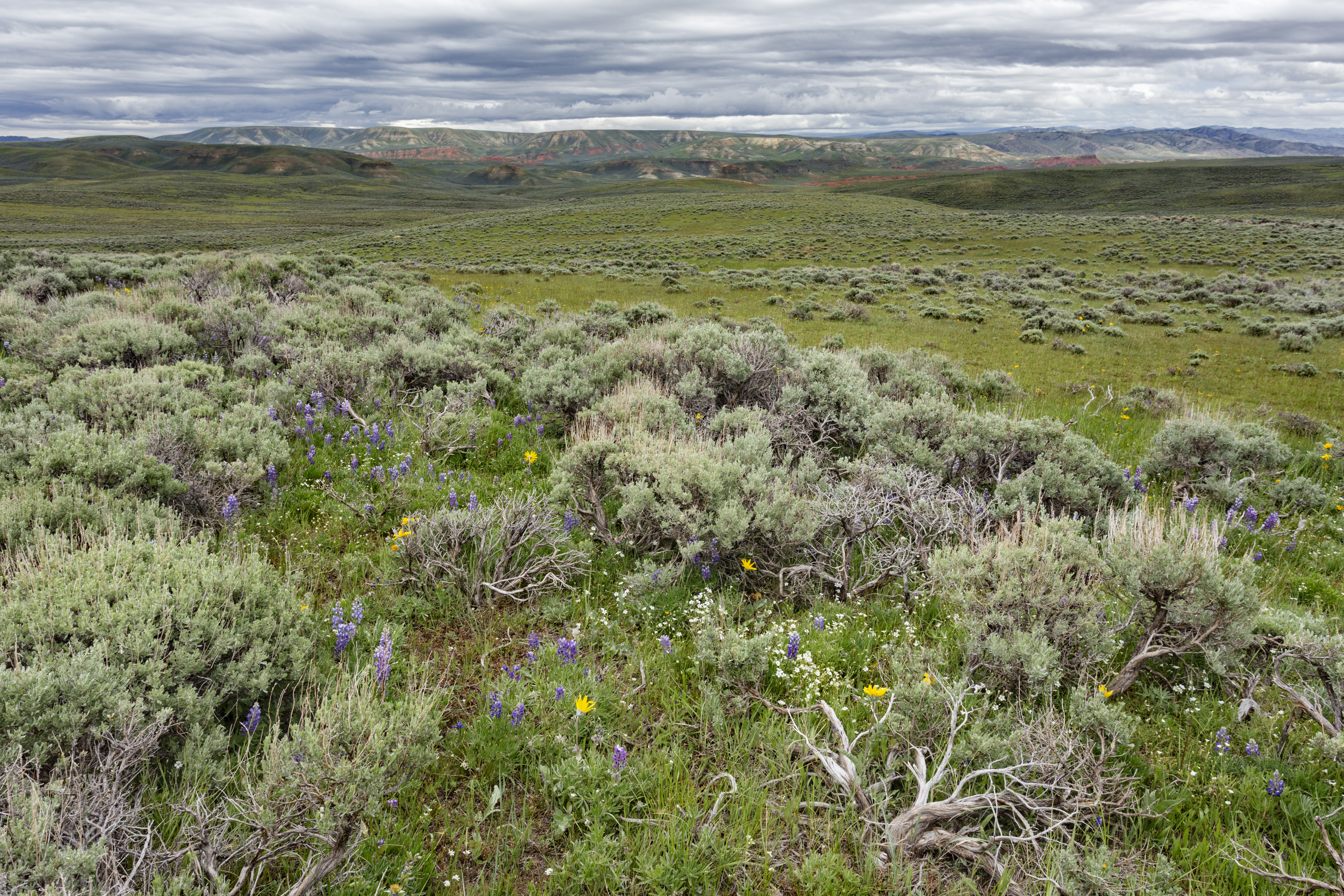
Blooming amid sagebrush in the Wyoming Bridger Mountains between West Bridger Creek and South Bridger Creek

Yellow paintbrush is native to the Intermountain West from Colorado and Utah northwards. The Natural Resources Conservation Service only records the variety rustica of the species growing in Lincoln County, Washington with no other known populations. Likewise rustica is the only variety found in northeastern Oregon. Both varieties are found in Idaho, but rustica is far more widespread growing throughout central parts of the state and flava in the southeast. Both varieties grow in Montana, but primarily flava and all in the southwestern end of the state. It is found throughout the western two-thirds of Wyoming. In Colorado it grows in the northwest, almost entirely west of the Great Divide except for small numbers to in Jackson County. The species is primarily in eastern counties of Utah as far south as Garfield County, but also in Box Elder County in the northwest. It also is native to the three northern counties of Nevada, Elko, Humboldt, and Washoe. It grows at elevations of 300 to 3,000 meters (980–9,840 ft).

Yellow paintbrush is associated with various shrubby sagebrush species in communities such as the sagebrush steppe. It grow in valleys and lower reaches of the mountains, only occasionally reaching the subalpine zone.
