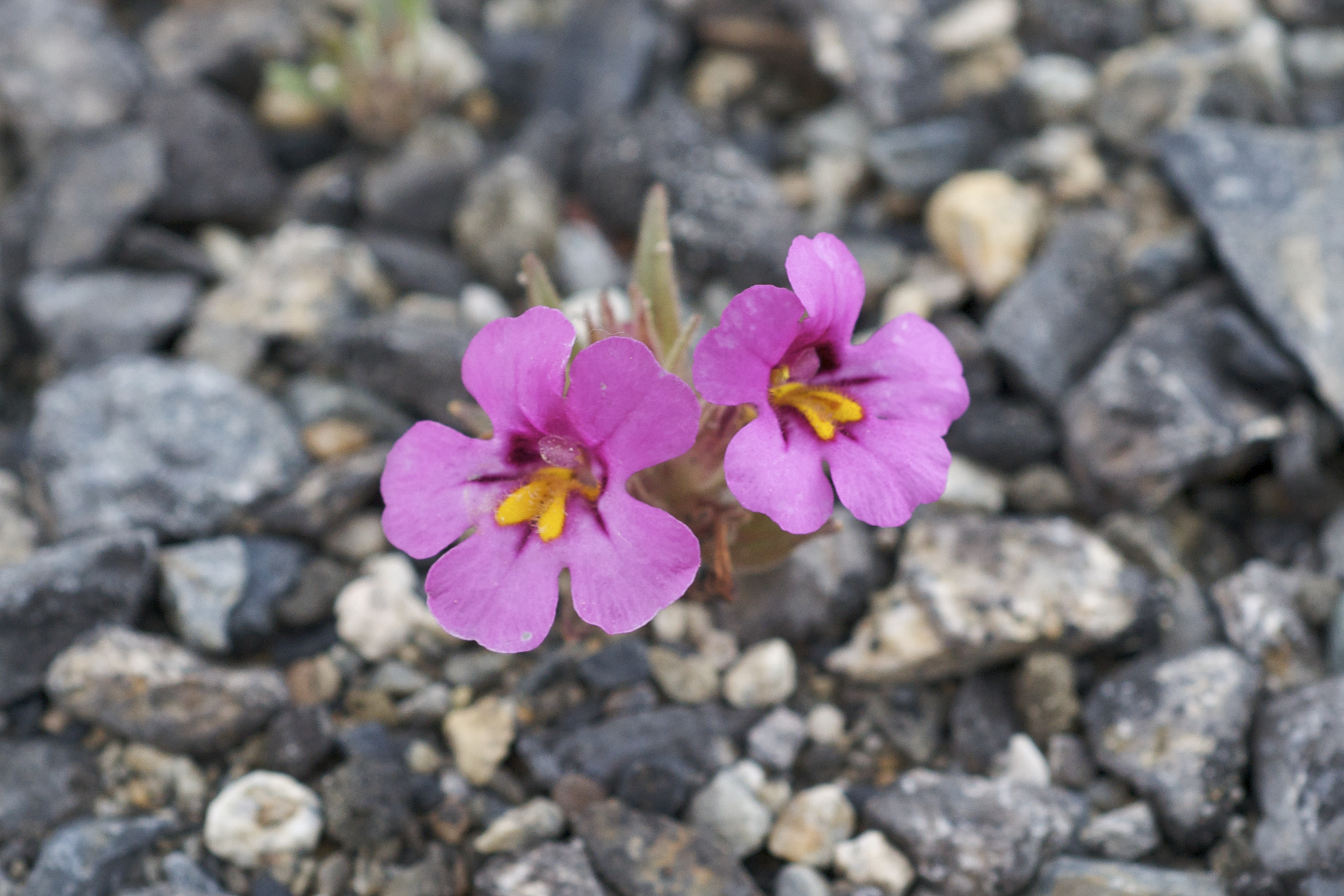

Conservation status
- Secure (NatureServe)

Scientific classification
- Kingdom: Plantae
- Clade: Embryophytes
- Clade: Tracheophytes
- Clade: Angiosperms
- Clade: Eudicots
- Clade: Asterids
- Order: Lamiales
- Family: Phrymaceae
- Genus: Diplacus
- Species: D. nanus

Binomial name
- Diplacus nanus (Hook. & Arn.) G.L.Nesom

Synonyms
- Eunanus austinae Greene; Eunanus fremontii S.Watson; Eunanus nanus (Hook. & Arn.) Holz.; Eunanus tolmiaei Benth.; Mimulus austinae (Greene) Rattan; Mimulus microphyton Pennell; Mimulus nanus Hook. & Arn.; Mimulus nanus var. pluriflorus Hook. & Arn.; Mimulus pluriflorus Hook. & Arn.; Mimulus reifschneiderae Edwin; Mimulus tolmiei Rydb., nom. illeg. superfl.

= Diplacus nanus =

Species of flowering plant

Diplacus nanus is a species of monkeyflower known by the common name dwarf purple monkeyflower. It is native to California and the Northwestern United States to Montana. It grows in moist habitat, often in bare or disturbed soils. It was formerly known as Mimulus nanus.

== Description ==
Diplacus nanus is a hairy annual herb growing at ground level or erect to 10 centimeters tall. The oppositely arranged purple-green leaves are oval or oblong and up to 2.5 centimeters long.

The tubular, wide-faced flower is usually magenta or purple with two yellow stripes in the mouth, but is occasionally all yellow. The flower is up to 2 cm long.

== Taxonomy ==
The species was first described as Mimulus nanus by William Jackson Hooker & George Arnott Walker-Arnott in 1839. In 2012 Guy L. Nesom placed the species in genus Diplacus as D. nanus.
