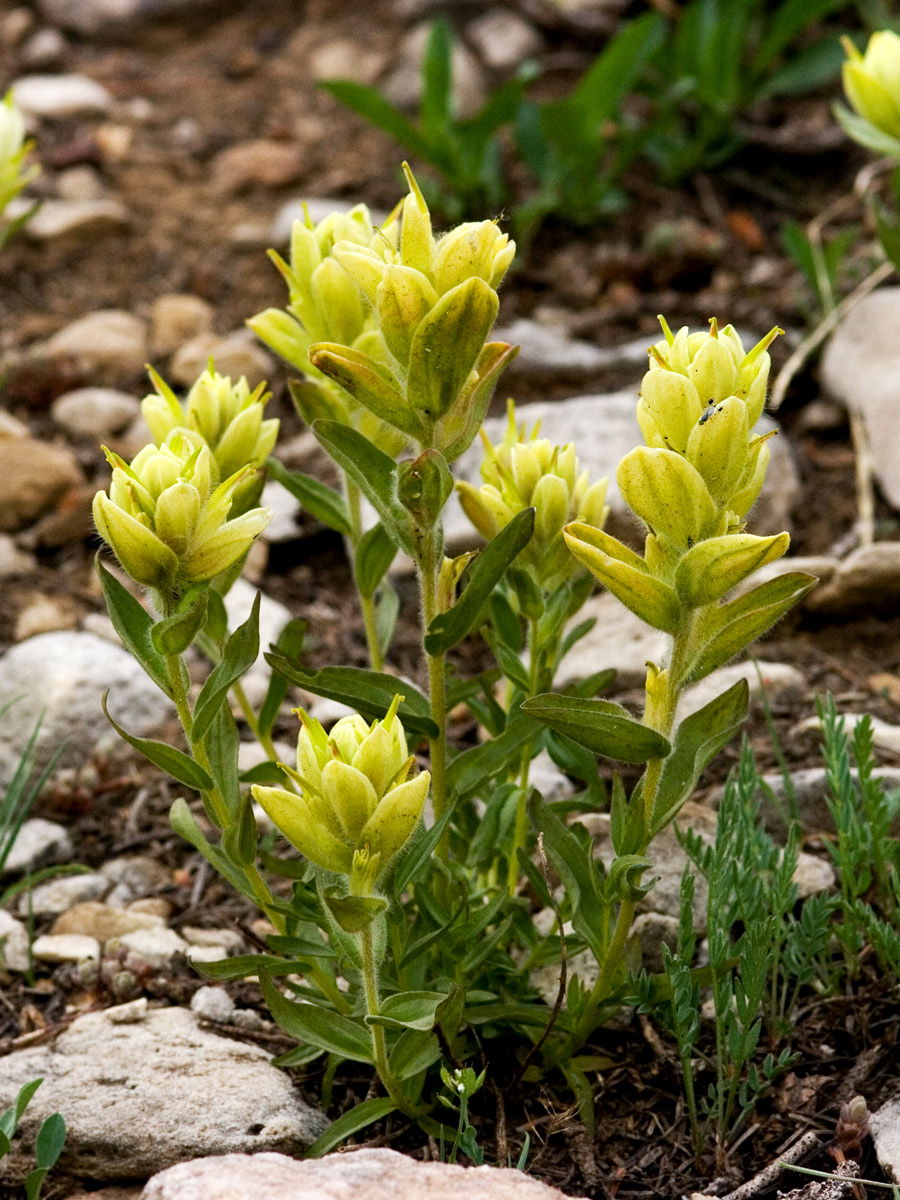

Conservation status
- Secure (NatureServe)

Scientific classification
- Kingdom: Plantae
- Clade: Embryophytes
- Clade: Tracheophytes
- Clade: Spermatophytes
- Clade: Angiosperms
- Clade: Eudicots
- Clade: Asterids
- Order: Lamiales
- Family: Orobanchaceae
- Genus: Castilleja
- Species: C. septentrionalis

Binomial name
- Castilleja septentrionalis Lindl.

Synonyms
- List: Castilleja brunnescens; Castilleja luteovirens; Castilleja sulphurea; Castilleja wyomingensis

= Castilleja septentrionalis =

Plant species in the broomrape family

Castilleja septentrionalis is a species of Indian paintbrush known by several common names, including northern paintbrush, sulfur paintbrush, and pale painted cup. There is taxonomic disagreement as to if it is one species widely distributed in mountain and alpine environments of North America or if there is a second species, Castilleja sulphurea, in the Rocky Mountains.

According to the White Mountain National Forest botanist Chris Mattrick, "The stunning beauty of the inflorescence stands out in sharp contrast to the green and gray background of the alpine habitats in New England and elicits many complimentary remarks from the passerby."

== Description ==
Castilleja septentrionalis is a perennial herbaceous plant that usually grows to a height of 25–55 centimeters, though will sometimes be as short as 15 centimeters or as tall as 70 centimeters. It typically is found growing in small dense colonies. Like many other Castilleja species, it gets some of its nutrients from parasitizing the roots of other plants. The underground portions of the plant are a woody caudex atop either a single taproot or branched roots that may be either slender or thick. When mature each plant will produce a clump of stems varying in number that either grow straight upwards or curve outward from the base and then upwards. The stems of Castilleja septentrionalis can be either branch or unbranched and are covered in short stiff glandular hairs, though sometimes the base of the stem will be hairless or nearly hairless(glabrous or glabrate).

The leaves of Castilleja septentrionalis are green to purplish in color with a narrow to broad spear-head shape (linear-lanceolate to lanceolate). Usually they are 2–7 centimeters long, though occasionally about 1 centimeters longer. The leaves are sometimes divided into as many as three lobes, each tip of a leaf or lobe will be bluntly pointed, not rounded or very sharp. The leaves are also very thin with very easy to see veins.

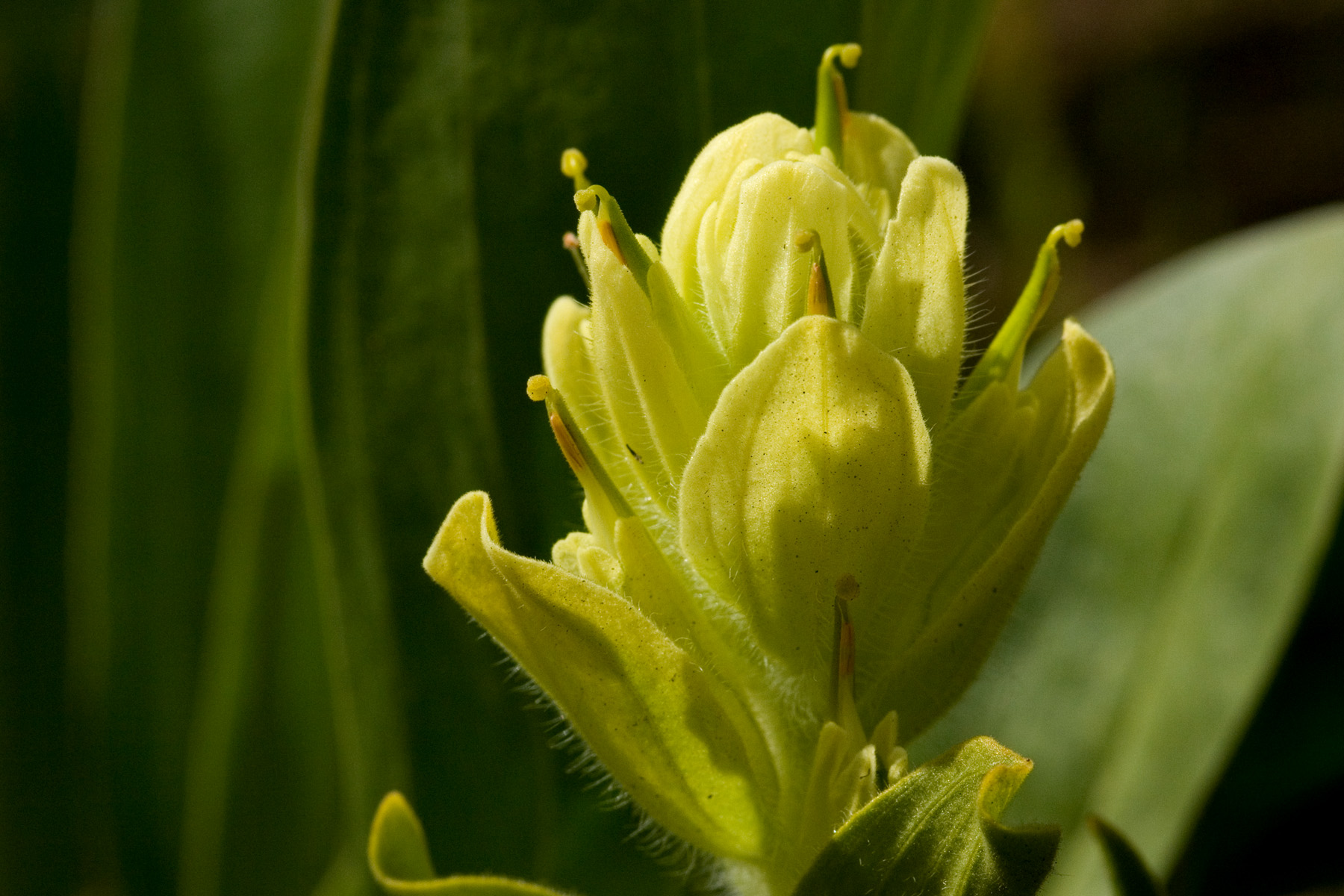
Photo showing the showy bracts with partially hidden flowers

Flowering takes place from May to September, occasionally as early as April. The pale yellow-green inflorescences of Castilleja septentrionalis range in size from 2.1 to 11 centimeters in height and 1.5–4 centimeters in width. The larger part colored parts of the inflorescence are bracts, rather than petals. Though usually sulfurous yellow to green where they attach to the stem, they can be brown-purple near the base. The bracts shade to white, cream, or canary yellow at the tips. Occasionally they can have a rose blush or a touch of buff, or light tan. The shape of the bracts is similar to the leaves on C. septentrionalis, lanceolate to oblong or obovate, sometimes fully lanceolate and with a variable number of lobes from none to three or occasionally as many as five. The central lobe will be bluntly pointed like the leaves while the ones to the sides will be more sharply pointed (acute).

The actual flowers are much smaller, with the flower sepals (calyx) usually 13–23 millimeters in length, or at most 28 millimeters. The sepals are the same color as the larger bracts. The two petals are 18–30 millimeters in length and straight, and are united into a tube 10–20 millimeters long. They are green to yellowish in color.

== Taxonomy ==
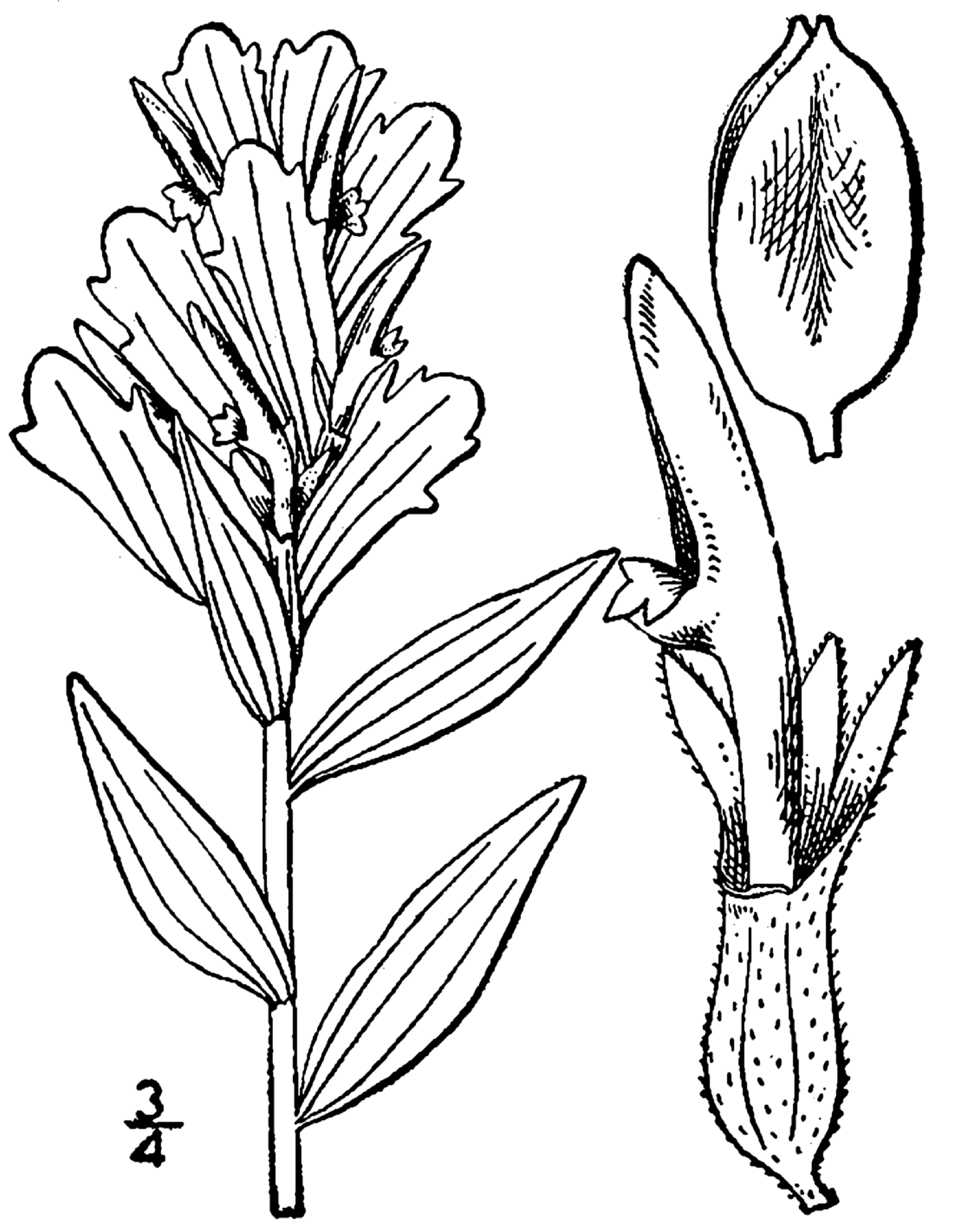
Illustration showing the dissected flower of Castilleja septentrionalis, 1913

Castilleja septentrionalis was first scientifically described and named as a species by John Lindley in 1825. The first publication was in volume 11 of The Botanical Register and described a specimen that sprouted and bloomed in a garden in Chiswick in 1824 along with, "wild specimens from Hudson's Bay and Labrador". The living plant was accidentally brought to the UK with other plants in "turfs" imported from Labrador by the Horticultural Society.

In 1900 the Per Axel Rydberg formally published a description from a type specimen collected on Electric Peak in Montana with Charles Edwin Bessey, naming it Castilleja sulphurea.

As of 2025 the Natural Resources Conservation Service PLANTS database (PLANTS) continues to recognize both Castilleja septentrionalis and Castilleja sulphurea as separate species in the northeast of North America and in the Rocky Mountains respectively. On the other hand Plants of the World Online (POWO), World Flora Online (WFO), and Flora of North America (FNA) synonymize Castilleja sulphurea with Castilleja septentrionalis. If C. sulphurea is considered a synonym then the species has a total of eight synonyms including four species.

Table of Synonyms
Name	Year	Rank	Notes
Castilleja brunnescens Rydb.	1904	species	= het.
Castilleja luteovirens Rydb.	1901	species	= het.
Castilleja pallida subsp. septentrionalis (Lindl.) Scoggan	1978	subspecies	≡ hom.
Castilleja pallida var. septentrionalis (Lindl.) A.Gray	1876	variety	≡ hom.
Castilleja rhexiifolia var. sulphurea (Rydb.) N.D.Atwood	1986	variety	= het.
Castilleja septentrionalis var. micmacorum J.Rousseau	1950	variety	= het.
Castilleja sulphurea Rydb.	1900	species	= het.
Castilleja wyomingensis Rydb.	1901	species	= het.
Notes: ≡ homotypic synonym; = heterotypic synonym

=== Names ===
Castilleja septentrionalis was named in binomial name with the genus name honoring Domingo Castillejo and a species name meaning "northern" in Botanical Latin. One of its common names, northern paintbrush, is essentially a translation of this binomial. It is more frequently called the sulfur paintbrush for the pale yellow blooms that call to mind the soft color of elemental sulfur. It is also known by the common names pale painted cup, Labrador Indian paintbrush, and northern painted-cup. Though it is known as alpine paintbrush, both Castilleja rhexiifolia and Castilleja puberula are also known by this name.

== Habitat and range ==
Castilleja septentrionalis is a very widespread species being found from the southern Rocky Mountains in New Mexico northwards to the Northwest Territories in Canada and throughout much of eastern Canada and the northern parts of New England. In the US. Rocky Mountain states it grows in Colorado, Idaho, Montana, New Mexico, Utah, and Wyoming with a somewhat disjunct population in the Black Hills of South Dakota. In Canada it is found in the Rocky Mountain provinces of Alberta and British Columbia, in the arctic in the Northwest Territories and Nunavut, and in Labrador, New Brunswick, Newfoundland, Ontario, and Québec. In New England it grows in Maine, New Hampshire, and Vermont while it is only found rarely in Michigan and Minnesota.

In New Hampshire, it is an alpine obligate, typically found in patch communities associated with heavy late-melting snow, which provides not only moisture but also protection from weather. It is found only in northern regions or at high elevations.

Castilleja septentrionalis was evaluated by NatureServe as a separate species from Castilleja sulphurea with a global status globally secure (G5) in 2015. At the state level they evaluated it as secure (S5) in Ontario, apparently secure (S4) on the Island of Newfoundland, in Labrador, and in Quebec. In Maine they evaluated the population as vulnerable (S3), the Michigan population as imperiled S2, and critically imperiled (S1) in New Hampshire and Vermont. Likewise they evaluated Castilleja sulphurea in the Rocky Mountains as globally secure (G5) in 2002, but only evaluated the populations of Montana and Wyoming, which they found to be apparently secure (G4).
