= List of plants used in herbalism =

Plants used to treat Animal & Human Illnesses

This is an alphabetical list of plants used in herbalism.

Phytochemicals possibly involved in biological functions are the basis of herbalism, and may be grouped as:

- primary metabolites, such as carbohydrates and fats found in all plants
- secondary metabolites serving a more specific function.

For example, some secondary metabolites are toxins used to deter predation, and others are pheromones used to attract insects for pollination. Secondary metabolites and pigments may have therapeutic actions in humans, and can be refined to produce drugs; examples are quinine from the cinchona, morphine and codeine from the poppy, and digoxin from the foxglove.

In Europe, apothecaries stocked herbal ingredients as traditional medicines. In the Latin names for plants created by Linnaeus, the word officinalis indicates that a plant was used in this way. For example, the marsh mallow has the classification Althaea officinalis, as it was traditionally used as an emollient to soothe ulcers. Pharmacognosy is the study of plant sources of phytochemicals.

Some modern prescription drugs are based on plant extracts rather than whole plants. The phytochemicals may be synthesized, compounded or otherwise transformed to make pharmaceuticals. Examples of such derivatives include aspirin, which is chemically related to the salicylic acid found in white willow. The opium poppy is a major industrial source of opiates, including morphine. Few traditional remedies, however, have translated into modern drugs, although there is continuing research into the efficacy and possible adaptation of traditional herbal treatments.

== A ==
Scientific name	Common name	Description	Picture
Acacia senegal	Gum arabic	A natural gum sourced from hardened sap of various species of acacia tree used in ancient birth control as well as a binder and emulsifier for medicinal compounds.	
Achillea millefolium	Common yarrow	Purported to be a diaphoretic, astringent, tonic, stimulant and mild aromatic.	
Actaea racemosa	Black cohosh	Historically used for arthritis and muscle pain, used more recently for conditions related to menopause and menstruation.	
Aesculus hippocastanum	Horse chestnut	Its seeds, leaves, bark, and flowers have been used medicinally for many centuries for treating joint pain, bladder and gastrointestinal problems, fever, leg cramps, and other conditions. It may be useful for treating chronic venous insufficiency. The raw plant materials are toxic unless processed.	
Ageratina altissima	White snakeroot	Root tea has been used to treat diarrhea, kidney stones, and fever. A root poultice can be used on snakebites. The smoke from burning leaves is used to revive unconscious people. The plant contains the toxin tremetol which causes milk sickness, a sometimes fatal condition.	
Alcea rosea	Common hollyhock	Believed to be an emollient and laxative. It is used to control inflammation, to stop bedwetting and as a mouthwash in cases of bleeding gums.	
Alisma plantago-aquatica	Water-plantain	Used for the urinary tract.	
Allium sativum	Garlic	Purported use to lower blood cholesterol and high blood pressure.	
Aloe vera	Aloe vera	Leaves are widely used to heal burns, wounds and other skin ailments.	
Althaea officinalis	Marsh-mallow	Used historically as both a food and a medicine.	
Amorphophallus konjac	Konjac	Significant dietary source of glucomannan, which is purported for use in treating obesity, constipation, and reducing cholesterol.	
Anemone hepatica	Common hepatica	Historically used to treat liver diseases, it is still used in alternative medicine today. Other modern applications by herbalists include treatments for pimples, bronchitis and gout.	
Angelica archangelica	Garden angelica	Roots have been used in the traditional Austrian medicine internally as tea or tincture for treatment of disorders of the gastrointestinal tract, respiratory tract, nervous system, and also against fever, infections, and flu.	
Angelica sinensis	Dong quai	Used for thousands of years in Asia, primarily in women's health.	
Apium graveolens	Celery	Seed is used only occasionally in tradition medicine. Modern usage is primarily as a diuretic.	
Arctium lappa	Burdock	Used traditionally as a diuretic and to lower blood sugar and, in traditional Chinese medicine as a treatment for sore throat and symptoms of the common cold.	
Arnica montana	Arnica	Used as an anti-inflammatory and for osteoarthritis. The US Food and Drug Administration has classified Arnica montana as an unsafe herb because of its toxicity. It should not be taken orally or applied to broken skin where absorption can occur.	
Astragalus propinquus	Astragalus	Long used in traditional Chinese medicine.	
Atropa belladonna	Belladonna	Although toxic, was used historically in Italy by women to enlarge their pupils, as well as a sedative, among other uses. The name itself means "beautiful woman" in Italian.	.
Azadirachta indica	Neem	Used in India to treat worms, malaria, rheumatism and skin infections among many other things. Its many uses have led to neem being called "the village dispensary" in India.	

== B ==
Scientific name	Name	Description	Picture
Bellis perennis	Daisy	Flowers have been used in the traditional Austrian medicine internally as tea (or the leaves as a salad) for treatment of disorders of the gastrointestinal and respiratory tract.	
Berberis vulgaris	Barberry	Long history of medicinal use, dating back to the Middle Ages particularly among Native Americans. Uses have included skin ailments, scurvy and gastro-intestinal ailments.	
Borago officinalis	Borage	Used in hyperactive gastrointestinal, respiratory and cardiovascular disorders, such as gastrointestinal (colic, cramps, diarrhea), airways (asthma, bronchitis), cardiovascular, (cardiotonic, antihypertensive and blood purifier), urinary (diuretic and kidney/bladder disorders).	
Broussonetia kurzii	Salae	Known as Salae in Thailand where this species is valued as a medicinal plant.	

== C ==
Scientific name	Name	Description	Picture
Calendula officinalis	Marigold	Also named calendula, has a long history of use in treating wounds and soothing skin.	
Cannabis	Hemp, Cannabis, Marijuana, Indian hemp, Ganja	Used worldwide since ancient times as treatment for various conditions and ailments including pain, inflammation, gastrointestinal issues such as IBS, muscle relaxation, anxiety, Alzheimer's and dementia, ADHD, autism, cancer, cerebral palsy, recurring headaches, Crohn's disease, depression, epilepsy, glaucoma, insomnia, and neuropathy among others.	
Capsicum annuum	Cayenne	Type of chili that has been used as both food and medicine for thousands of years. Uses have included reducing pain and swelling, lowering triglyceride and cholesterol levels and fighting viruses and harmful bacteria, due to high levels of Vitamin C.	
Capsicum frutescens	Chili	Its active ingredient, capsaicine, is the basic of commercial pain-relief ointments in Western medicine. The low incidence of heart attack in Thais may be related to capsaicine's fibronolytic action (dissolving blood clots).	
Carica papaya	Papaya	Used for treating wounds and stomach troubles.	
Cassia occidentalis	Coffee senna	Used in a wide variety of roles in traditional medicine, including in particular as a broad-spectrum internal and external antimicrobial, for liver disorders, for intestinal worms and other parasites and as an immune-system stimulant.	
Catha edulis	Khat	Mild stimulant used for thousands of years in Yemen, and is banned today in many countries. Contains the amphetamine-like substance cathinone.	
Cayaponia espelina	São Caetano melon	It is a diuretic and aid in the treatment of diarrhea and syphilis.	
Centaurea cyanus	Cornflower	In herbalism, a decoction of cornflower is effective in treating conjunctivitis and as a wash for tired eyes.	
Chrysopogon zizanioides	Vetiver	Used for skin care.	
Cinchona	Cinchona	Genus of about 38 species of trees whose bark is a source of alkaloids, including quinine. Its use as a febrifuge was first popularized in the 17th century by Peruvian Jesuits.	
Citrus × aurantium	Bitter orange	Used in traditional Chinese medicine and by indigenous peoples of the Amazon for nausea, indigestion and constipation.	
Citrus limon	Lemon	Along with other citruses, it has a long history of use in Chinese and Indian traditional medicine. In contemporary use, honey and lemon is common for treating coughs and sore throat.	
Citrus trifoliata	Trifoliate orange, bitter orange	Fruits of Citrus trifoliata are widely used in Oriental medicine as a treatment for allergic inflammation.	
Cissampelos pareira	Velvetleaf	Used for a wide variety of conditions.	
Cnicus benedictus	Blessed thistle	Used during the Middle Ages to treat bubonic plague. In modern times, herbal teas made from blessed thistle are used for loss of appetite, indigestion and other purposes.	
Crataegus monogyna and Crataegus laevigata	Hawthorn	Fruit has been used for centuries purportedly for heart disease, digestive and kidney related problems.	
Curcuma longa	Turmeric	Spice that lends its distinctive yellow color to Indian curries, has long been used in Ayurvedic and traditional Chinese medicine to aid digestion and liver function, relieve arthritis pain, and regulate menstruation.	
Cypripedium parviflorum	Yellow lady's slipper	The Cypripedium species have been used in native remedies for dermatitis, tooth aches, anxiety, headaches, as an antispasmodic, stimulant and sedative. However, the preferred species for use are Cyp. parviflorum and Cyp.acaule, used as topical applications or tea.	

== D ==
Scientific name	Name	Description	Picture
Digitalis lanata	Digitalis or foxglove	It came into use in treating cardiac disease in late 18th century England in spite of its high toxicity.^{a} Its use has been almost entirely replaced by the pharmaceutical derivative Digoxin, which has a shorter half-life in the body, and whose toxicity is therefore more easily managed. Digoxin is used as an antiarrhythmic agent and inotrope.	

== E ==
Scientific name	Name	Description	Picture
Echinacea purpurea	Purple coneflower	This plant and other species of Echinacea have been used for at least 400 years by Native Americans to treat infections and wounds, and as a general "cure-all" (panacea). It is currently used for symptoms associated with cold and flu.	
Echinopsis pachanoi	San Pedro cactus	The San Pedro cactus contains the entheogen mescaline and has a long history of being used in Andean traditional medicine.	
Ephedra sinica	Ephedra	It has been used in traditional Chinese medicine for more than 2,000 years. Native Americans and Mormon pioneers drank a tea brewed from other Ephedra species, called "Mormon tea" and "Indian tea". It contains the alkaloids ephedrine and pseudoephedrine, which are used as breathing aids (bronchodilators and decongestants).	
Equisetum arvense	Horsetail	Dates back to ancient Roman and Greek medicine, when it was used to stop bleeding, heal ulcers and wounds, and treat tuberculosis and kidney problems.	
Eriodictyon crassifolium	Yerba Santa	Used by the Chumash people to keep airways open for proper breathing. The US Forest Service profile for Eriodictyon crassifolium provides information on species distribution; taxonomic relationships; ecological and evolutionary considerations for restoration; growth form and distinguishing traits; habitat characteristics; projected future suitable habitat; growth, reproduction and dispersal; biological interactions; ecological genetics; seed characteristics, germination requirements and processing; and plant uses including agriculture, restoration, and traditional products, plus an extensive bibliography. It is part of Riverside-Corona Resource Conservation District's resource materials collection on native plant recommendations for southern California ecoregions.	
Erythroxylum coca	Coca	Used as coca tea or chewed, traditionally as a stimulant to overcome fatigue, hunger, thirst, and altitude sickness. Also used as an anesthetic and analgesic.	
Eschscholzia californica	Californian poppy	Used as a herbal remedy: an aqueous extract of the plant has sedative and anxiolytic actions.	
Eucalyptus globulus	Eucalyptus	Leaves were widely used in traditional medicine as a febrifuge. Eucalyptus oil is commonly used in over-the-counter cough and cold medications, as well as for an analgesic.	
Euonymus atropurpureus	Wahoo	Plant is a purgative and might affect the heart.	
Euphorbia hirta	Asthma-plant	Used traditionally in Asia to treat bronchitic asthma and laryngeal spasm. It is used in the Philippines for dengue fever.	
Euphrasia	Eyebright	Used for eye problems, mental depression, oxygenation and radiation poisoning.	
Euterpe oleracea	Açai	Although açai berries are a longstanding food source for indigenous people of the Amazon, there is no evidence that they have effectiveness for any health-related purpose.	

== F ==
Scientific name	Name	Description	Picture
Ferula assa-foetida	Asafoetida	Might be useful for IBS, high cholesterol, and breathing problems.	
Frangula alnus	Alder buckthorn	Bark (and to a lesser extent the fruit) has been used as a laxative, due to its 3 – 7% anthraquinone content. Bark for medicinal use is dried and stored for a year before use, as fresh bark is violently purgative; even dried bark can be dangerous if taken in excess.	
Fumaria officinalis	Fumitory	Traditionally thought to be good for the eyes and to remove skin blemishes. In modern times herbalists use it to treat skin diseases and conjunctivitis, as well as to cleanse the kidneys. However, Howard (1987) warns that fumitory is poisonous and should only be used under the direction of a medical herbalist.	

== G ==
Scientific name	Name	Description	Picture
Galanthus	Snowdrop	It contains an active substance called galantamine, which is an acetylcholinesterase inhibitor. Galantamine (or galanthamine) can be helpful in the treatment of Alzheimer's disease, though it is not a cure.	
Geranium robertianum	Robert geranium	In traditional herbalism, it was used as a remedy for toothache and nosebleeds and as a vulnerary (used for or useful in healing wounds).	
Ginkgo biloba	Ginkgo	The leaf extract has been used to treat asthma, bronchitis, fatigue, Alzheimer's and tinnitus.	
Glechoma hederacea	Ground-ivy	It has been used as a "lung herb". Other traditional uses include as an expectorant, astringent, and to treat bronchitis. The essential oil of the plant has been used for centuries as a general tonic for colds and coughs, and to relieve congestion of the mucous membranes.	
Glycyrrhiza glabra	Licorice root	Purported uses include stomach ulcers, bronchitis, and sore throat.	

== H ==
Scientific name	Name	Description	Picture
Hamamelis virginiana	Common witch-hazel	It produces a specific kind of tannins called hamamelitannins. One of those substances displays a specific cytotoxic activity against colon cancer cells.	
Hippophae rhamnoides	Sea buckthorn	The leaves are used as herbal medicine to alleviate cough and fever, pain, and general gastrointestinal disorders as well as to cure dermatologic disorders. Similarly, the fruit juice and oils can be used in the treatment of liver disease, gastrointestinal disorders, chronic wounds or other dermatological disorders.	
Hoodia gordonii	Hoodia	The plant is traditionally used by Kalahari San (Bushmen) to reduce hunger and thirst. It is marketed as an appetite suppressant.	
Hydrastis canadensis	Goldenseal	Although used traditionally by Native Americans to treat skin diseases and ulcers, there is no scientific evidence to support the use of goldenseal for treating any disease.	
Hypericum perforatum	St. John's wort	Widely used within herbalism for depression. Evaluated for use as an antidepressant, but with ambiguous results.	
Hyssopus officinalis	Hyssop	It is purported for digestive and intestinal problems, and for respiratory problems.	

== I ==
Scientific name	Name	Description	Picture
Ilex paraguariensis	Yerba mate	Mate contains compounds that may improve mood.	
Illicium verum	Star anise	It is the major source of the chemical compound shikimic acid, a primary precursor in the pharmaceutical synthesis of anti-influenza drug oseltamivir (Tamiflu).	
Inula helenium	Elecampane	It is used in herbal medicine as an expectorant and for water retention.	

== J ==
Scientific name	Name	Description	Picture
Jasminum officinale	Jasmine	It is purported as either an antiseptic or anti-inflammatory agent.	

== K ==
Scientific name	Name	Description	Picture
Knautia arvensis	Field scabious	The whole plant is astringent and mildly diuretic.	

== L ==
Scientific name	Name	Description	Picture
Larrea tridentata	Chaparral	The leaves and twigs are used by Native Americans to make a herbal tea used for a variety of conditions. Chaparral has also been shown to have high liver toxicity, and has led to kidney failure, and is not recommended for any use by the U.S. Food and Drug Administration or American Cancer Society.	
Laurus nobilis	Bay laurel	Aqueous extracts of bay laurel can be used as astringents and even as a reasonable salve for open wounds.	
Lavandula angustifolia	Lavender	It was traditionally used as an antiseptic and for mental health purposes. It was also used in ancient Egypt in mummifying bodies. There is little scientific evidence that use of lavender affects health.	
Lawsonia inermis	Henna		
Leucojum aestivum	Summer snowflake		
Linum usitatissimum	Flaxseed	The plant is most commonly used as a laxative. Flaxseed oil is used for different conditions, including arthritis.	

== M ==
Scientific name	Name	Description	Picture
Magnolia officinalis	Magnolia-bark	The bark contains magnolol and honokiol, two polyphenolic compounds.	
Malva sylvestris	Mallow	The seeds are used internally in a decoction or herbal tea as a demulcent and diuretic, and the leaves made into poultices as an emollient for external applications.	
Matricaria recutita and Anthemis nobilis	Chamomile	It has been used over history for a variety of conditions, including sleeplessness and anxiety.	
Medicago sativa	Alfalfa	The leaves are purported to lower cholesterol, and treat kidney and urinary tract ailments, although there is insufficient scientific evidence for its efficacy.	
Melaleuca alternifolia	Tea tree oil	It has been used over history by Australian aboriginal people. Modern usage is primarily as an antibacterial or antifungal agent, but there is insufficient scientific evidence for such effects.	
Melissa officinalis	Lemon balm	It is purported as a sleep aid and digestive aid.	
Mentha × piperita	Peppermint	Its oil, from a cross between water mint and spearmint, has a history of purported use for various conditions, including nausea, indigestion, and symptoms of the common cold.	
Mitragyna speciosa	Kratom	Kratom leaves are chewed to relieve musculoskeletal pain and increase energy, appetite, and sexual desire in ways similar to khat and coca.	
Momordica charantia	Bitter melon		
Morinda citrifolia	Noni	It is purported for joint pain and skin conditions.	
Moringa oleifera	Drumstick tree	It is used for food and traditional medicine.	

== N ==
Scientific name	Name	Description	Picture
Nasturtium officinale	Watercress		
Nelumbo nucifera	Lotus	Insufficient evidence for any biological effect.	
Nigella sativa	Nigella, black-caraway, black-cumin, and kalonji	One meta-analysis of clinical trials concluded that N. sativa has a short-term benefit on lowering systolic and diastolic blood pressure.	

== O ==
Scientific name	Name	Description	Picture
Ocimum tenuiflorum	Tulsi or holy basil	It is used for a variety of purposes in traditional medicine; tulsi is taken in many forms: as herbal tea, dried powder, fresh leaf or mixed with ghee. Essential oil extracted from Karpoora tulasi is mostly used for medicinal purposes and in herbal cosmetics.	
Oenothera	Evening primrose	Its oil has been used since the 1930s for eczema, and more recently as an anti-inflammatory, but there is insufficient evidence for it having any effect.	
Origanum vulgare	Oregano		

== P ==
Scientific name	Name	Description	Picture
Panax spec.	Ginseng	Asian ginseng may affect glucose metabolism and lower blood sugar levels, but the poor quality of research prevents conclusions about such effects.	
Papaver somniferum	Opium poppy	The plant is the plant source of morphine, used for pain relief. Morphine made from the refined and modified sap is used for pain control in people with severe cancer.	
Passiflora	Passion flower		
Peganum harmala	Syrian Rue (common name Harmal)		
Pelargonium sidoides	Umckaloabo, or South African Geranium	Possibly useful for treating respiratory infections.	
Piper methysticum	Kava	The plant has been used for centuries in the South Pacific to make a ceremonial drink with sedative and anesthetic properties, with potential for causing liver injury.	
Piscidia erythrina / Piscidia piscipula	Jamaica dogwood	The plant is used in traditional medicine for the treatment of insomnia and anxiety, despite serious safety concerns. A 2006 study suggested medicinal potential.	
Plantago lanceolata	Plantain	It is used frequently in herbal teas and other herbal remedies. A tea from the leaves is used as a highly effective cough medicine. In the traditional Austrian medicine Plantago lanceolata leaves have been used internally (as syrup or tea) or externally (fresh leaves) for treatment of disorders of the respiratory tract, skin, insect bites, and infections.	
Platycodon grandiflorus	Platycodon, balloon flower	The extracts and purified platycoside compounds (saponins) from the roots may exhibit neuroprotective, antimicrobial, anti-inflammatory, anti-cancer, anti-allergy, improved insulin resistance, and cholesterol-lowering properties.	
Polemonium reptans	Abscess root	It is used to reduce fever, inflammation, and cough.	
Psidium guajava	Guava	It has a rich history of use in traditional medicine. It is traditionally used to treat diarrhea; however, evidence of its effectiveness is very limited.	
Ptelea trifoliata	Wafer Ash	The root bark is used for the digestive system. Also known as hoptree.	
Pulmonaria officinalis	Lungwort	Used since the Middle Ages to treat and/or heal various ailments of the lungs and chest.	

== Q ==
Scientific name	Name	Description	Picture
Quassia amara	Amargo, bitter-wood	A 2012 study found a topical gel with 4% Quassia extract to be a safe and effective cure of rosacea.	

== R ==
Scientific name	Name	Description	Picture
Reichardia tingitana	False sowthistle	Uses in folk medicine have been recorded in the Middle East, its leaves being used to treat ailments such as constipation, colic and inflamed eyes.	
Rosa majalis	Cinnamon rose	It yields edible hip fruits rich in vitamin C, which are used in medicine and to produce rose hip syrup.	
Rosmarinus officinalis	Rosemary	It has been used medicinally from ancient times.	
Ruellia tuberosa	Minnieroot, fever root, snapdragon root	In folk medicine and Ayurvedic medicine it has been used as a diuretic, anti-diabetic, antipyretic, analgesic, antihypertensive, gastroprotective, and to treat gonorrhea.	
Rumex crispus	Curly dock or yellow dock	In Western herbalism the root is often used for treating anemia, due to its high level of iron. The plant will help with skin conditions if taken internally or applied externally to things like itching, scrofula, and sores. It is also used for respiratory conditions, specifically those with a tickling cough that is worse when exposed to cold air. It mentions also passing pains, excessive itching, and that it helps enlarged lymphs.	

== S ==
Scientific name	Name	Description	Picture
Salix alba	White willow	Plant source of salicylic acid, white willow is like the chemical known as aspirin, although more likely to cause stomach upset as a side effect than aspirin itself which can cause the lining of the stomach to be destroyed. Used from ancient times for the same uses as aspirin.	
Salvia officinalis	Sage	Shown to improve cognitive function in patients with mild to moderate Alzheimer's disease.	
Sambucus nigra	Elderberry	The berries and leaves have traditionally been used to treat pain, swelling, infections, coughs, and skin conditions and, more recently, flu, common cold, fevers, constipation, and sinus infections.	
Santalum album	Indian sandalwood	Sandalwood oil has been widely used in folk medicine for treatment of common colds, bronchitis, skin disorders, heart ailments, general weakness, fever, infection of the urinary tract, inflammation of the mouth and pharynx, liver and gallbladder complaints and other maladies.	
Santolina chamaecyparissus	Cotton lavender	Most commonly, the flowers and leaves are made into a decoction used to expel intestinal parasites.	
Saraca indica	Ashoka tree	The plant is used in Ayurvedic traditions to treat gynecological disorders. The bark is also used to combat oedema or swelling.	
Satureja hortensis	Summer savory	Its extracts show antibacterial and antifungal effects on several species including some of the antibiotic resistant strains.	
Sceletium tortuosum	Kanna	African treatment for depression. Suggested to be an SSRI or have similar effects, but unknown mechanism of activity.	
Senna auriculata	Avaram senna	The root is used in decoctions against fevers, diabetes, diseases of urinary system and constipation. The leaves have laxative properties. The dried flowers and flower buds are used as a substitute for tea in case of diabetes patients. The powdered seed is also applied to the eye, in case of chronic purulent conjunctivitis.	
Sesuvium portulacastrum	Shoreline purslane	The plant extract showed antibacterial and anticandidal activities and moderate antifungal activity.	
Silybum marianum	Milk thistle	It has been used for thousands of years for a variety of medicinal purposes, in particular liver problems.	
Stachytarpheta cayennensis	Blue snakeweed	Extracts of the plant are used to ease the symptoms of malaria. The boiled juice or a tea made from the leaves or the whole plant is taken to relieve fever and other symptoms. It is also used for dysentery, pain, and liver disorders. A tea of the leaves is taken to help control diabetes in Peru and other areas. Laboratory tests indicate that the plant has anti-inflammatory properties.	
Stellaria media	Common chickweed	It has been used as a remedy to treat itchy skin conditions and pulmonary diseases. 17th century herbalist John Gerard recommended it as a remedy for mange. Modern herbalists prescribe it for iron-deficiency anemia (for its high iron content), as well as for skin diseases, bronchitis, rheumatic pains, arthritis and period pain.	
Strobilanthes callosus	Karvy	The plant is anti-inflammatory, antimicrobial, and anti-rheumatic.	
Symphytum officinale	Comfrey	It has been used as a vulnerary and to reduce inflammation. It was also used internally in the past, for stomach and other ailments, but its toxicity has led a number of other countries, including Canada, Brazil, Australia, and the United Kingdom, to severely restrict or ban the use of comfrey.	
Syzygium aromaticum	Clove	The plant is used for upset stomach and as an expectorant, among other purposes. The oil is used topically to treat toothache.	

== T ==
Scientific name	Name	Description	Picture
Tanacetum parthenium	Feverfew	The plant has been used for centuries for fevers, headaches, stomach aches, toothaches, insect bites and other conditions.	
Taraxacum officinale	Dandelion	It was most commonly used historically to treat liver diseases, kidney diseases, and spleen problems.	
Teucrium scordium	Water germander	It has been used for asthma, diarrhea, fever, intestinal parasites, hemorrhoids, and wounds.	
Thymus vulgaris	Thyme	The plant is used to treat bronchitis and cough. It serves as an antispasmodic and expectorant in this role. It has also been used in many other medicinal roles in Asian and Ayurvedic medicine, although it has not been shown to be effective in non-respiratory medicinal roles.	
Tilia cordata	Small-leaved linden	In the countries of Central, Southern and Western Europe, linden flowers are a traditional herbal remedy made into a herbal tea called tisane.	
Tradescantia zebrina	Inchplant	It is used in southeast Mexico in the region of Tabasco as a cold herbal tea, which is named Matali. Skin irritation may result from repeated contact with or prolonged handling of the plant, particularly from the clear, watery sap (a characteristic unique to T. zebrina as compared with other types).	
Trema orientalis	Charcoal-tree	The leaves and the bark are used to treat coughs, sore throats, asthma, bronchitis, gonorrhea, yellow fever, toothache, and as an antidote to general poisoning.	
Trifolium pratense	Red clover	The plant is an ingredient in some recipes for essiac tea. Research has found no benefit for any human health conditions.	
Trigonella foenum-graecum	Fenugreek	It has long been used to treat symptoms of menopause, and digestive ailments. More recently, it has been used to treat diabetes, loss of appetite and other conditions.	
Triticum aestivum	Wheatgrass	It may contain antioxidant and anti-inflammatory compounds.	
Turnera subulata	White buttercup	It is used for skin, gastrointestinal, and respiratory ailments.	

== U ==
Scientific name	Name	Description	Picture
Uncaria tomentosa	Cat's claw	It has a long history of use in South America to prevent and treat disease.	
Urtica dioica	Common nettle, stinging nettle	It has been used in the traditional Austrian medicine internally (as tea or fresh leaves) to treat disorders of the kidneys and urinary tract, gastrointestinal tract, locomotor system, skin, cardiovascular system, hemorrhage, influenza, rheumatism, and gout.	

== V ==
Scientific name	Name	Description	Picture
Vaccinium spec.	Blueberries	They are of current medical interest as an antioxidant and for urinary tract ailments.	
Vaccinium macrocarpon	Cranberry	It was used historically as a vulnerary and for urinary disorders, diarrhea, diabetes, stomach ailments, and liver problems. Modern usage has concentrated on urinary tract related problems.	
Vaccinium myrtillus	Bilberry	It is used to treat diarrhea, scurvy, and other conditions.	
Valeriana officinalis	Valerian	It has been used since at least ancient Greece and Rome for sleep disorders and anxiety.	
Verbascum thapsus	Common mullein	It contains glycyrrhizin compounds with bactericide and potential anti-tumoral action. These compounds are concentrated in the flowers.	
Verbena officinalis	Verbena	It is used for sore throats and respiratory tract diseases.	
Vernonia amygdalina	Bitter leaf	The plant is used by both primates and indigenous peoples in Africa to treat intestinal ailments such as dysentery.	
Veronica officinalis	Veronica	The plant is used for sinus and ear infections.	
Viburnum tinus	Laurustinus	V. tinus has medicinal properties. The active ingredients are viburnin (a substance or more probably a mixture of compounds) and tannins. Tannins can cause stomach upset. The leaves when infused have antipyretic properties. The fruits have been used as purgatives against constipation. The tincture has been used lately in herbal medicine as a remedy for depression. The plant also contains iridoid glucosides.	
Viola tricolor	Wild pansy	It is one of many viola plant species containing cyclotides. These small peptides have proven to be useful in drug development due to their size and structure giving rise to high stability. Many cyclotides, found in Viola tricolor are cytotoxic. This feature means that it could be used to treat cancers.	
Viscum album	European mistletoe	It has been used to treat seizures, headaches, and other conditions.	
Vitex agnus-castus	Chasteberry	It has been used for over thousands of years for menstrual problems, and to stimulate lactation.	
Vitis vinifera	Grape	The leaves and fruit have been used medicinally since the ancient Greeks.	

== W ==
Scientific name	Name	Description	Picture
Withania somnifera	Ashwagandha	The plant's long, brown, tuberous roots are used in traditional medicine. In Ayurveda, the berries and leaves are applied externally to tumors, tubercular glands, carbuncles, and ulcers.	

== X ==
Scientific name	Name	Description	Picture
Xanthoparmelia scabrosa	Sexy footpath lichen	It is a lichen used for sexual dysfunction.	

== Y ==
Scientific name	Name	Description	Picture
Youngia japonica	Japanese hawkweed	The plant is antitussive and febrifuge. It is also used in the treatment of boils and snakebites.	

== Z ==
Scientific name	Name	Description	Picture
Zingiber officinale	Ginger	Ginger is effective for the relief of nausea.	

== Databases ==
- Manhã EM, Silva MC, Alves MG, Almeida MB, Brandão MG (October 3, 2008). "PLANT - A bibliographic database about medicinal plants". Revista Brasileira de Farmacognosia. 18 (4): 614–617. doi:10.1590/S0102-695X2008000400020.
- Duke J. "Dr. Duke's Phytochemical and Ethnobotanical Databases".
- "Protabase: Useful Plants of Tropical Africa". Plant Resources of Tropical Africa. Archived from the original on 2011-12-16.
- "Tropical Plant Database". Raintree.
- "Plant Database". Plants for a Future.
- "Vitamins & Supplements Center". WebMD.

== See also ==
- Chinese classic herbal formula
- History of birth control
- List of branches of alternative medicine
- List of culinary herbs and spices
- List of herbs with known adverse effects
- Materia Medica
- Medicinal mushrooms
- Medicinal plants of the American West
- Medicinal plants traditionally used by the indigenous peoples of North America
- Naturopathic medicine
- Wikispecies

== Notes ==
- Digitalis use in the United States is controlled by the U.S. Food and Drug Administration and can only be prescribed by a physician. Misuse can cause death.
- This encyclopedia is not a substitute for medical advice nor a complete description of these herbs, their dangers (up to and including death), and their (in)compatibility with alcohol or other drugs.
