= List of plants in The English Physitian =

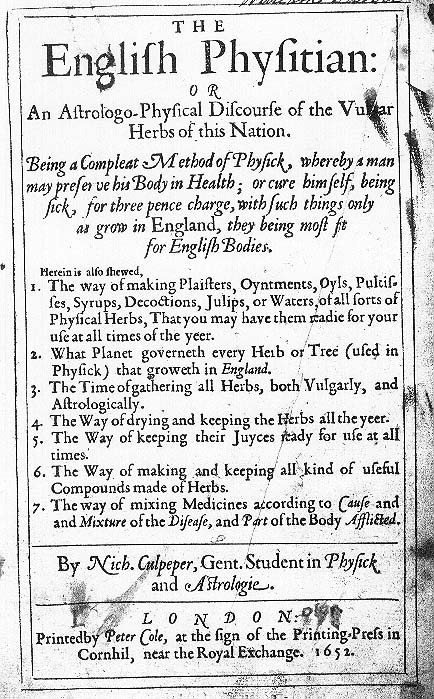
The title page of The English Physitian.

Below is the list of plants, listed under the section "Catalogue of the Herbs and Plants, in this Treatise, appropriated to their several PLANETS" in the 1652 medical text The English Physitian: or an Astrologo-physical Discourse of the Vulgar Herbs of This Nation by Nicholas Culpeper.

== Under Saturn (53) ==
- Barley
- Red Beets
- Beech-tree
- Bifoyl, or Twayblade
- Birdsfoot
- Bistort, or Snakeweed
- Blewbottles (Bluebottle)
- Buckshorn-Plantane
- Wild Campions
- Pilewort
- Cleavers, or Goosegrass
- Clowns Woundwort
- Comfry
- Cudweed, or Cottonweed
- Sciatica Cresses
- Crosswort
- Darnel
- Doddar
- Epithimum
- Elm-tree
- Osmond Royal
- Fleawort
- Flixweed
- Fumitory
- Stinking Gladwin
- Goutwort
- Wintergreen
- Haukweed
- Hemlock
- Hemp
- Henbane
- Horstail
- Knapweed
- Knotgrass
- Medlar-tree
- Moss
- Mullein
- Nightshade
- Polypodium
- Poplar-tree
- Quince-tree
- Rupture-wort
- Rushes
- Solomons-Seal
- Sarazens Confound
- Service-tree
- Spleenwort, or Cetrach
- Tamarisk
- Melancholy-thistle
- Blackthorn
- Throughwax
- Tutsan, or Parkleaves
- Woad

== Under Jupiter (34) ==
- Agrimony
- Alexanders
- Asparagus
- Avens (Wood Avens)
- Bay-tree
- White Beets
- Water-Bettony
- Wood-Bettony
- Bilberries
- Borrage
- Bugloss
- Chervil
- Sweet Cicely
- Cinkfoyl
- Costmary, or Alecost
- Dandelyon
- Docks
- Bloodwort
- Dog, or Quich-grass
- Endive
- Hart's Tongue, or Asplenium scolopendrium
- Hyssop
- Housleek, or Sengreen
- Liverwort
- Lungwort
- Sweet Maudlin, or Achillea ageratum
- Oak-tree
- Red Roses
- Sage
- Sauce alone, Jack by the Hedge, or Alliaria petiolata
- Scurvy-grass
- Succory
- Our Ladies Thistles or Silybum marianum

== Under Mars (40) ==
- Arsesmart
- Asarabacca
- Barberry-bush
- Sweet Basil
- Bramble-bush
- Briony
- Brooklime
- Butcher's Broom
- Broom (shrub)
- Broomrape
- Crowfoot
- Cuckoopint, or Wake-Robin
- Cranesbill
- Cotton thistle
- Flax-weed, or Toadflax
- Fursebush
- Garlic
- Hawthorn
- Hops
- Madder
- Masterwort
- Mustard plant
- Hedge Mustard
- Nettles
- Onions
- Pepperwort, or Dittander
- Carduus Benedictus, in the Epistle
- Rhadish, or Radish
- Horse Rhadish, or Horseradish
- Rhubarb
- Rapontick
- Bastard Rhubarb
- Thistles
- Star thistle
- Tobacco
- Wolly Thistle
- Treacle Mustard
- Mithridate Mustard
- Wold, Weld, or Dyers Weed (Mignonette)
- Wormwood

== Under the Sun (25) ==
- Angelica
- Ash-tree
- Bawm (Lemon Balm)
- One-blade
- Burnet (Salad Burnet)
- Butterbur
- Chamomel, or Chamomile
- Chelondine
- Centaury
- Eyebright
- St. Johns wort
- Lovage
- Marigolds
- Mistletoe
- Peony
- St. Peters wort
- Pimpernel
- Rosa Solis
- Rosemary
- Rhue, or Rue
- Saffron
- Tormentil
- Turnsole, or Heliotropium
- Viper's Bugloss
- Walnut tree

== Under Venus (73) ==
- Alehoof, or Ground-Ivy
- Black Alder tree
- Alter-Tree
- Apple Tree
- Stinking Arrach
- Arch-Angel, or Dead Nettles (Deadnettle)
- Beans
- Lady's Bedstraw
- Birch tree
- Bishop's weed
- Blites
- Bugle, or Carpet bugle
- Burdock
- Cherry tree
- Winter Cherries (Alkekengi officinarum or Withania somnifera)
- Chickweed
- Cichpease, or Chickpea
- Clary
- Cocks-head
- Coltsfoot
- Cowslips, or Primula veris
- Daisies
- Devils-bit
- Elder, or Elderberry
- Dwarf Elder
- Eringo
- Featherfew
- Figwort
- Filipendula
- Foxgloves
- Goldenrod
- Gromwell
- Groundsel
- Herb Robert
- Herb Truelove
- Kidneywort, or Anemone hepatica
- Lady's Mantle
- Mallows
- Marsh Mallows, or Althaea officinalis
- Mercury (plant)
- Mints
- Motherwort
- Mugwort
- Nep, or Catmint
- Parsnip
- Peach tree
- Pear tree
- Pennyroyal
- Plantane, or Narrowleaf Plantain
- Plum tree
- Primroses, or Primula vulgaris
- Ragwort
- Rocket, or Arugula
- Winter Rocket
- Damask Roses, or Rosa damascena
- Wood Sage
- Sanicle
- Selfheal
- Sopewort (Soapwort), or Bruisewort (Comfrey)
- Sorrel
- Wood Sorrel
- Sow Thistles, or Sonchus
- Spignel
- Strawberries
- Garden Tansy
- Wild Tansy (Ambrosia artemisiifolia), or Silverweed
- Teazles
- Vervain
- Vine-tree, or Lauraceae
- Violets
- Wheat
- Yarrow

== Under Mercury (35) ==
- Calamintha, or Mountain Mint
- Carrots
- Carraway
- Dill
- Elicampane (Elecampane)
- Fern
- Fennel
- Hogs Fennel
- Germander
- Hazel Nut tree
- Horehound
- Houndstongue, or Cynoglossum officinale
- Lavender
- Liquoris, or Liquorice
- Wall-Rhue
- Maiden's Hair (Maidenhair fern)
- Golden Maidenhair
- Sweet Marjoram
- Melilot
- Moneywort
- Mulberry tree
- Oats
- Parsley
- Cow Parsnip
- Pellitory of the Wall, or Lichwort
- Ground Pine, or Chamepitys
- Rest-harrow, or Chamock
- Sampire
- Summer Savory and Winter Savory
- Scabious
- Smallage, or Celery
- Southernwood
- Meadow Trefoil, or Lotus (genus)
- Garden Valerian (Valeriana officinalis or Valeriana phu)
- Woodbind, or Honeysuckles

== Under the Moon (26) ==
- Adder's Tongue, or Ophioglossum
- Cabbages
- Coleworts
- Sea Coleworts, or Sea cabbage
- Columbines
- Watercresses
- Duckmeat or Duckweed
- Yellow Waterflag or Iris pseudacorus
- Flower-de-luce, or Iris (plant)
- Fluellin - may be Common Speedwell, Germander Speedwell, or Common Toadflax
- Ivy
- Lettuce
- Water Lily
- Loosestrife, with, and without spiked Heads
- Moonwort
- Mousear
- Orpine
- Poppies
- Purslane
- Privet
- Rattle-grass, or Yellow rattle
- White Roses
- White Saxifrage, or Saxifraga paniculata
- Burnet Saxifrage
- Wall-flowers, Winter-gilliflowers, or Dame's Rocket
- Willow-tree
