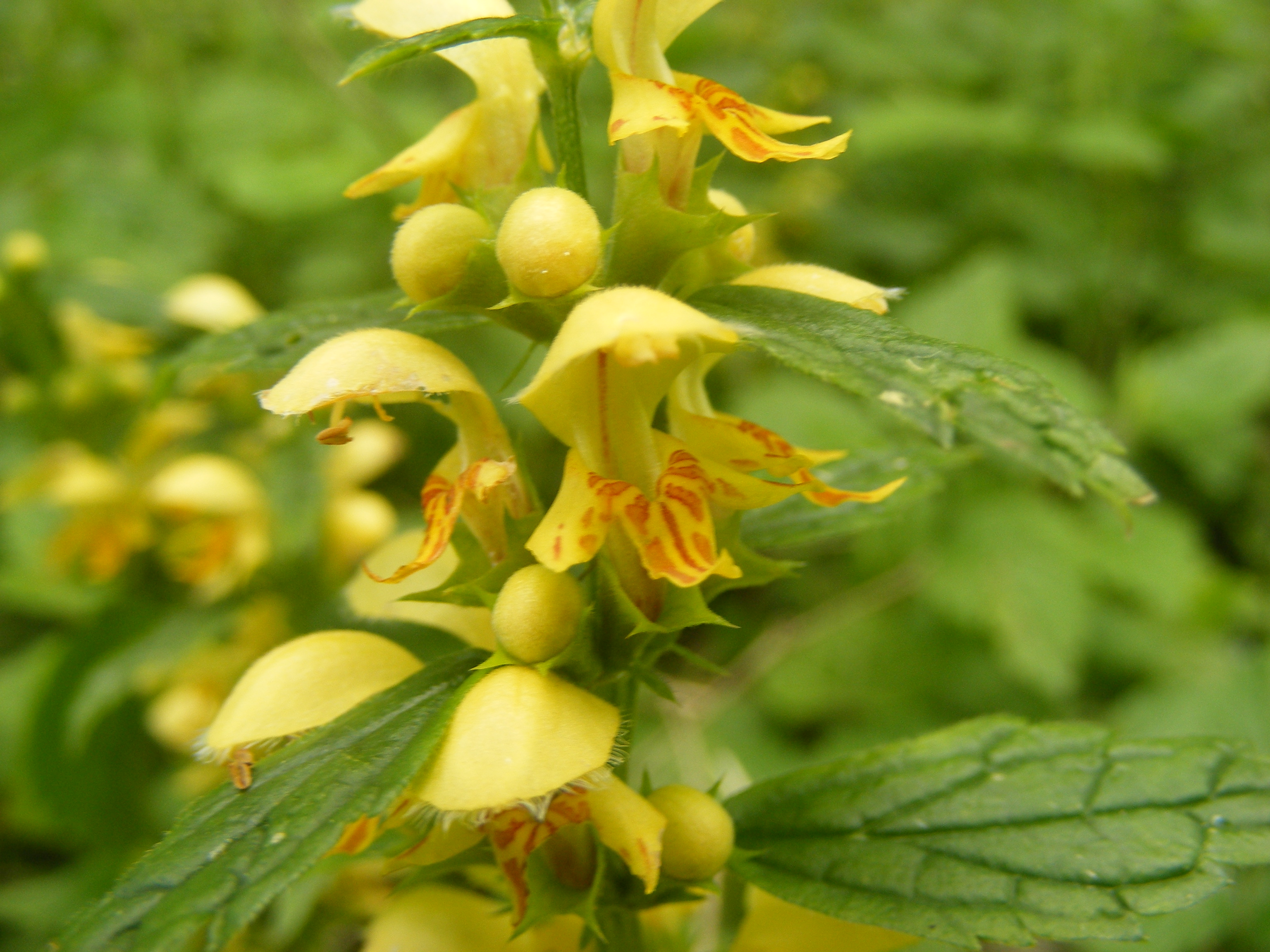

Scientific classification
- Kingdom: Plantae
- Clade: Tracheophytes
- Clade: Angiosperms
- Clade: Eudicots
- Clade: Asterids
- Order: Lamiales
- Family: Lamiaceae
- Genus: Lamium
- Species: L. galeobdolon

Binomial name
- Lamium galeobdolon (L.) L.

Synonyms
- Lamium galeobdolon: Galeopsis galeobdolon L. (basionym); Neckeria galeobdolon (L.) Forsyth f.; Galeobdolon galeobdolon (L.) H.Karst., nom. illeg.; Lamiastrum galeobdolon (L.) Ehrend. & Polatschek; Leonurus galeobdolon (L.) Scop.; Pollichia galeobdolon (L.) Schrank; L. g. subsp. argentatum: Galeobdolon argentatum Smejkal (basionym); Lamiastrum argentatum (Smejkal) Soják; Lamiastrum galeobdolon subsp. argentatum (Smejkal) Stace; Lamium argentatum (Smejkal) Henker ex G.H.Loos; Lamium galeobdolon f. argentatum (Smejkal) Mennema; L. g. subsp. flavidum: Lamium flavidum F.Herm. (basionym); Galeobdolon flavidum (F.Herm.) Holub; Lamiastrum flavidum (F.Herm.) Ehrend.; Lamium pallidum F.Herm.; L. g. subsp. galeobdolon: Cardiaca sylvatica Lam.; Galeobdolon luteum Huds.; Galeobdolon luteum var. albomaculatum Salter ex J.Dix; Galeobdolon luteum var. regulare Gray; Galeobdolon umbrosum Wibel; Galeobdolon vulgare (Pers.) Pers.; Galeopsis lutea Gilib.; Lamium cavernianum Losa; Lamium luteum Krock.; Lamium vulgare (Pers.) Fritsch; Pollichia longicaulis Krock.; Pollichia vulgaris Pers.; L. g. subsp. montanum: Pollichia montana Pers. (basionym); Galeobdolon endtmannii (G.H.Loos) Holub; Galeobdolon luteum proles montanum (Pers.) Rouy; Galeobdolon luteum var. florentinum Silva Tar.; Galeobdolon luteum var. montanum (Pers.) Gray; Galeobdolon luteum subsp. montanum (Pers.) R.R.Mill; Galeobdolon montanum (Pers.) Rchb.; Galeopsis galeobdolon var. montanum (Pers.) Lej.; Lamiastrum galeobdolon subsp. montanum (Pers.) Ehrend. & Polatschek; Lamiastrum montanum (Pers.) Ehrend.; Lamium endtmannii G.H.Loos; Lamium galeobdolon var. montanum (Pers.) Pers.; Lamium galeobdolon f. montanum (Pers.) Bolzon; Lamium montanum subsp. endtmannii (G.H.Loos) G.H.Loos; Lamium montanum var. florentinum (Silva Tar.) Buttler & Schippm.; Lamium montanum (Pers.) Hoffm. ex Kabath

= Lamium galeobdolon =

Yellow archangel

Species of flowering plant

Lamium galeobdolon, the yellow archangel, is a species of flowering plant in the mint family Lamiaceae. It is native to Europe and western Asia but it is widely introduced in North America and elsewhere. It is the only species in the genus Lamium with yellow flowers. Another common name for this species is golden dead-nettle. In New Zealand, it is called the aluminium plant or artillery plant. The common names archangel and dead-nettle have been in use for hundreds of years, dating back to at least the 16th century.

Lamium galeobdolon comprises four closely related subspecies that are sometimes considered to be four separate species, one of which, the variegated yellow archangel (Lamium galeobdolon subsp. argentatum) from central Europe, is widely present as an invasive subspecies in several European countries outside of its native range and also in New Zealand, Canada, and the United States.

== Description ==
Lamium galeobdolon sensu lato is a perennial plant with square stems growing from 15 to 60 cm (6 to 24 in) tall. The paired opposite leaves are stalked with toothed margins. The leaves are 4 to 7 cm (2 to 3 in) long, and may or may not have silvery markings (an important character used to distinguish subspecies). The inflorescence is a pseudo-whorl of 4–16 flowers (called a verticillaster) clustered around the axil of a leaf-pair. Each flower has bilateral (zygomorphic) symmetry. The calyx is five-lobed and the corolla is yellow with a prominent hood. The flower's lower lip has three lobes with the central lobe often streaked with orange. There are two short stamens and two long ones. Flowering is in late spring to early summer, typically May–June in Britain. A pair of fused carpels give rise to a four-chambered schizocarp.

=== Identification ===
Subspecies of Lamium galeobdolon sensu lato are the only taxa in the genus with yellow flowers. All of the subspecies are stoloniferous except subspecies flavidum. The invasive subspecies argentatum is readily distinguished by its silvery white variegated leaves. The two subspecies galeobdolon and montanum can be difficult to distinguish but assuming the plant in question is in full flower, subspecies galeobdolon has a maximum of six (rarely seven) flowers per verticillaster while subspecies montanum averages ten flowers per verticillaster. The hairiness of the lower stems is also a useful clue, with subspecies galeobdolon having hairs on the four ridges only, while subspecies montanum is more uniformly hairy across the faces as well as the ridges.

Lamium galeobdolon subsp. flavidum is notable for the lack of stolons, frequently branched fertile stems with upright flowering lateral shoots, and 10–16 small flowers per verticillaster. An identification key for the remaining taxa follows:

Identification Key Lamium galeobdolon sensu lato in central and western Europe (excludes subspecies flavidum)
1a. Leaves and bracts (except for the uppermost) with a distinct silvery pattern (two flexuous bands along the midrib) persisting year around, bracts with wide apical teeth; flowers relatively large	Lamium galeobdolon subsp. argentatum
1b. Leaves generally without silvery pattern (if present, then never forming two continuous flexuous bands along the midrib); apical teeth of bracts mostly narrower; flowers relatively smaller	2
2a. The uppermost bracts ovate, generally less than twice as long as wide, with more-or-less equally distributed marginal teeth, apical tooth short and obtuse, lowermost bracts narrower or only slightly wider than the uppermost ones; the uppermost leaves shortly petiolate; verticillasters few-flowered (maximum number of flowers usually 4–7); hairs on the lower half of the stem almost entirely confined to the angles	Lamium galeobdolon subsp. galeobdolon
2b. The uppermost bracts lanceolate, more than twice as long as wide, marginal teeth towards the apex more separated, apical tooth long and acute; lowermost bracts mostly distinctly wider than the uppermost ones; the uppermost leaves with longer petioles; maximum number of flowers in verticillasters generally (6–)10–14; hairs on the lower half of the stem more or less equal distribution on the faces and the angles	Lamium galeobdolon subsp. montanum

Other taxa in the group can have marked leaves but those of subsp. argentatum are distinctive:

Permanent silvery pattern on leaf lamina in L. argentatum always forms two flexuous bands along the midrib, mostly not interrupted by the lateral veins. They are distinctive particularly from the late autumn to the early spring when a contrast brownish-maroon colouring develops on the abaxial side and extends to the midrib-zone of the upper leaf side. Although variegated leaves were frequently observed in all other taxa in our study, they never matched the description above. Silvery-grey markings constituted merely separate splashes or flecks (small-sized in L. montanum and L. flavidum, larger in L. galeobdolon), not merged into continuous bands. Thus, a combination of two distinct silvery flexuous bands together with a strong chocolate-maroon zone along the midrib in winter can be regarded as specific L. argentatum markers.

— Rosenbaumová, Plačková & Suda (2004)

In particular, a cultivar of subspecies flavidum known as 'Herman's Pride' has silver-spotted leaves, but even though the markings are unlike those of subspecies argentatum, the two taxa are sometimes confused.

The base chromosome number of taxa in genus Lamium is x = 9. Lamium galeobdolon subsp. flavidum and subsp. galeobdolon are diploid (2n = 2x = 18) while subsp. argentatum and subsp. montanum are tetraploid (2n = 4x = 36). A few triploid individuals have been reported. The triploids are thought to be natural hybrids between diploid subsp. galeobdolon and tetraploid subsp. argentatum.

== Taxonomy ==
Lamium galeobdolon was first described as Galeopsis galeobdolon by Carl Linnaeus in 1753. Linnaeus himself transferred the species to genus Lamium in 1759, and therefore the correct name in Lamium is Lamium galeobdolon (L.) L. The latter has six homotypic synonyms, one of which, Lamiastrum galeobdolon (L.) Ehrend. & Polatschek, is widely used.

The name galeobdolon (or Galeobdolon) has a long history. It was used by Pliny the Elder in the first century AD. Johann Jacob Dillenius referred to genus Galeobdolon in 1719, followed by Michel Adanson (1763), William Hudson (1778), and dozens of others. George Bentham used Galeobdolon as the name of a section in 1848. Later, in 1864, Paul Friedrich August Ascherson used it as the name of a subgenus. From the time of Linnaeus, numerous authors have used the specific epithet galeobdolon in the names of species. Altogether there are dozens of botanical names that use galeobdolon (or Galeobdolon) at least once. Most of them are synonyms for just a few taxa.

Most authorities with a global scope accept four closely related taxa, either as subspecies of Lamium galeobdolon (L.) L. or as full species in Lamium L. Other authorities accept one or more taxa in Lamiastrum Heist. ex Fabr. or Galeobdolon Huds.

Subspecies	Species complexes		
Lamium galeobdolon subsp. argentatum (Smejkal) J.Duvign.	Lamium argentatum (Smejkal) Henker ex G.H.Loos	Lamiastrum argentatum (Smejkal) Soják	Galeobdolon argentatum Smejkal
Lamium galeobdolon subsp. flavidum (F.Herm.) Á.Löve & D.Löve	Lamium flavidum F.Herm.	Lamiastrum flavidum (F.Herm.) Ehrend.	Galeobdolon flavidum (F.Herm.) Holub
Lamium galeobdolon subsp. galeobdolon	Lamium galeobdolon (L.) L. sensu stricto	Lamiastrum galeobdolon (L.) Ehrend. & Polatschek	Galeobdolon luteum Huds.
Lamium galeobdolon subsp. montanum (Pers.) Hayek Basionym: Pollichia montana Pers.	Lamium montanum (Pers.) Hoffm. ex Kabath	Lamiastrum montanum (Pers.) Ehrend.	Galeobdolon montanum (Pers.) Rchb.

Lamium galeobdolon subsp. argentatum was first described as Galeobdolon argentatum by Miroslav Smejkal in 1975. In a comprehensive and influential treatment of genus Lamium published in 1989, Jacob Mennema reduced the species to forma and placed it in synonymy with Lamium galeobdolon subsp. galeobdolon. Hence subsp. argentatum was neglected for a long time and its invasion history is poorly documented.

Based on nuclear DNA data, Lamium is monophyletic whether L. galeobdolon sensu lato is included or not. Based on chloroplast DNA data, however, the same study found Lamium to be paraphyletic if L. galeobdolon is segregated to genus Lamiastrum. Subsequent studies have found Lamiastrum to be nested within Lamium, that is, a separate genus is not warranted. The recognition of full species in Lamium is likewise not supported by molecular analysis.

=== Etymology ===
Both the generic name Lamium and the specific epithet galeobdolon were used by Pliny the Elder in the first century AD. The name galeobdolon has several possible origins. It may come from the Latin words galeo meaning "to cover with a helmet" and dolon meaning "a fly's sting", or it may come from the Greek words γαλέη (galéē) "weasel; marten; polecat", and βδόλος (bdólos) "foetid smell", an allusion to the smell of the leaves. The latter interpretation is likely the source of the old common name 'yellow weasel-snout'.

The common names archangel and dead-nettle have been in use for hundreds of years. In 1578 Rembert Dodoens observed that "Dead nettell groweth every where". John Gerard used the word "archangel" in 1633. Gerard believed the dead-nettles were so-named because their leaves resembled those of the true nettles in the family Urticaceae. The names "Arch-Angel" and "Dead Nettle" appear in the book The English Physitian (also known as the Complete Herbal) published by the English botanist and herbalist Nicholas Culpeper in 1652. Both Dodoens and Gerard believed the name "archangel" referred to members of genus Lamium with "clusters of hooded flowers at the nodes rising along the stems like a choir of robed figures". Others believe the name refers to the wing-like shape of its paired opposite leaves.

== Distribution ==
Lamium galeobdolon sensu lato is native across Europe, western Asia, and portions of the Middle East. It ranges from Ireland and Spain eastward across Europe as far as the West Siberian Plain and southeastward to Iran. Subspecies flavidum is native to the Alps, northern Italy, and the mountain ranges northeast of the Adriatic Sea. The two subspecies galeobdolon and montanum have broadly similar distributions, but the latter extends further west and south than subspecies galeobdolon, which itself has a more northeast distribution. Within Britain and Ireland, subspecies montanum is widespread across England and Wales and locally in southern Scotland and eastern Ireland, while subspecies galeobdolon is restricted to a small area in Lincolnshire in eastern England.

Lamium galeobdolon sensu lato is widely introduced in several European countries outside of its native range, and also in New Zealand, Canada, and the United States, but authorities disagree about the distribution of introduced subspecies. As of April 2024, Plants of the World Online (POWO) claims that subspecies argentatum has been introduced in Great Britain, Ireland, and Italy, but since it is elsewhere reported to be introduced in the Netherlands and Switzerland, the list is incomplete. POWO also claims that subspecies galeobdolon has been introduced in Madeira, New Zealand (both North Island and South Island), and the United States, but iNaturalist data show that subspecies argentatum is the most widespread subspecies in all of these areas. Since authoritative sources based in North America implicitly refer to Lamium galeobdolon sensu lato, POWO's claim is unsubstantiated. The list of U.S. states where Lamium galeobdolon sensu lato is said to occur varies dramatically depending on the source.

== Ecology ==
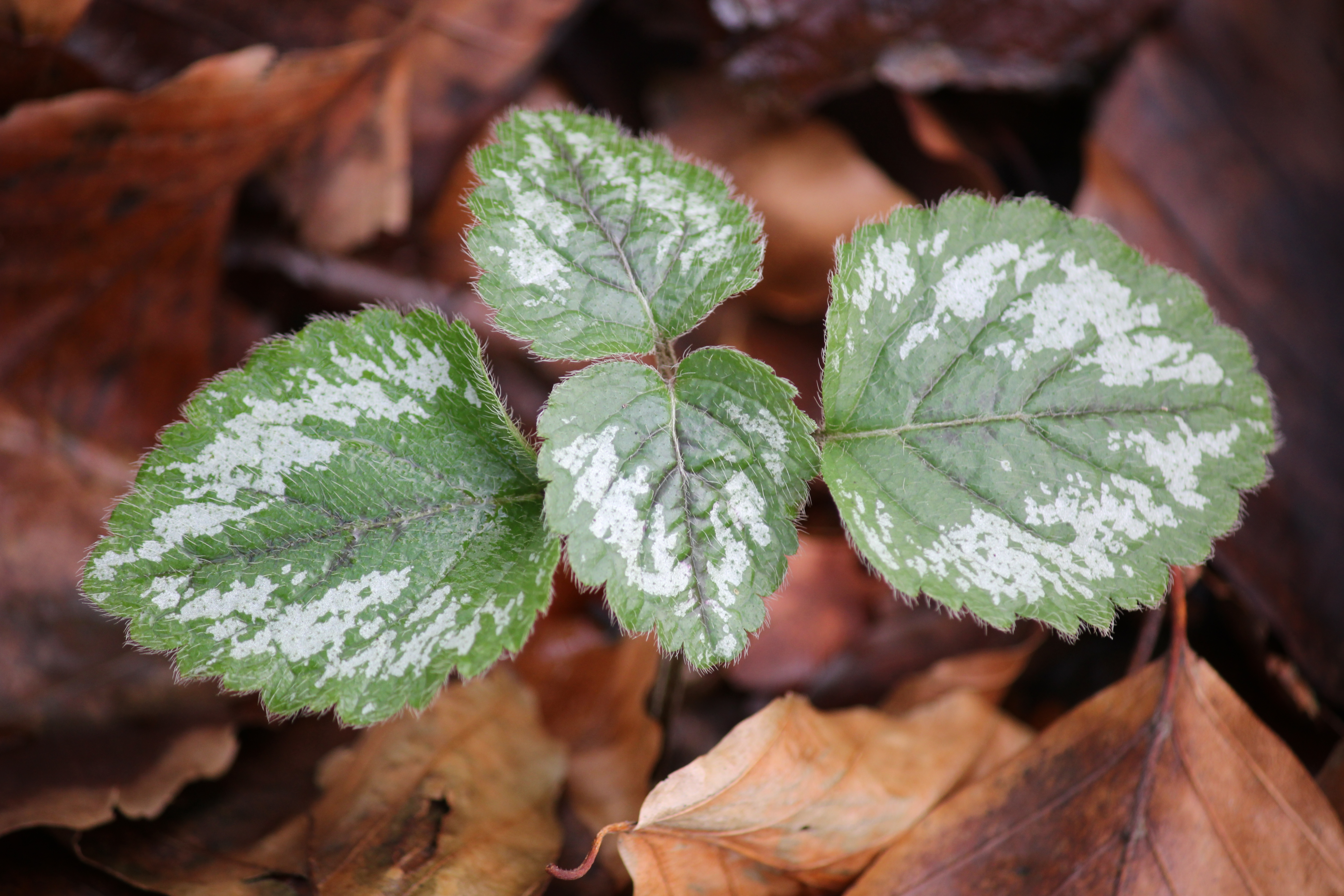
Seen from above during winter near Frederikshavn, Denmark

Lamium galeobdolon sensu lato has been widely introduced as a garden plant (often under the name Lamiastrum galeobdolon), especially in New Zealand, Canada, and the United States where it has escaped cultivation and become an invasive species. In New Zealand, it is listed by the 2020 National Pest Plant Accord and therefore banned from sale, propagation, and distribution throughout the country. It is also listed by the Invasive Species Council of British Columbia in Canada. In the U.S. state of Washington, it is listed as a Class B Noxious Weed and therefore banned from sale by state law. It is also a B-listed Noxious Weed in the state of Oregon.

The variegated yellow archangel (Lamium galeobdolon subsp. argentatum) has become an invasive subspecies in several European countries. In the Netherlands, subspecies argentatum was introduced as an ornamental ground cover, and by 1985 it had become naturalised and recorded in more localities than the native subspecies galeobdolon. It is also invasive in Britain where it spreads by stolons at the rate of 1–2 metres (3 ft 3 in – 6 ft 7 in) per growing season. In western England, it is found far from human habitations, which suggests it did not originate from garden waste and must therefore be spreading by other means. In Switzerland, subspecies argentatum tripled its occurrence in four decades (1980–2020) while exhibiting "a higher growth rate and regeneration capacity" than the native subspecies galeobdolon.

Outside of its native range, the invasive subspecies of Lamium galeobdolon in particular areas is largely unknown. In the Lower Mainland of British Columbia, the invasive entity is said to be a cultivar of subspecies montanum called 'variegatum' (also known as 'Florentinum'). A cultivar of subspecies argentatum called 'Florentinum' (also known as 'variegatum') has invaded the Seattle area in Washington State.

Based on morphological characters, number of chromosomes, pattern of geographical distribution, and phytochemistry, early botanists hypothesized that the tetraploid subsp. montanum originated as a hybrid between the two diploid taxa, subsp. flavidum and subsp. galeobdolon. However, more recent phylogenetic data suggests that subsp. montanum originated from subsp. flavidum alone. Similarly, there is conflicting evidence regarding the origins of the tetraploid subsp. argentatum suggesting that it may or may not have originated from subsp. galeobdolon alone.

== Gallery ==
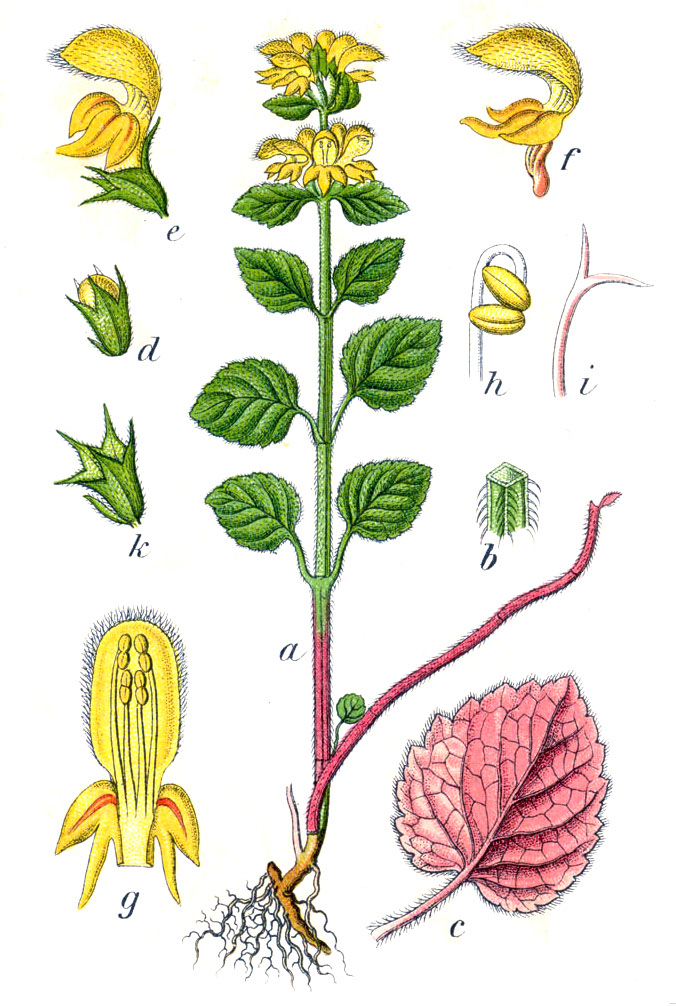
Botanical illustration by Johann Georg Sturm (1796)

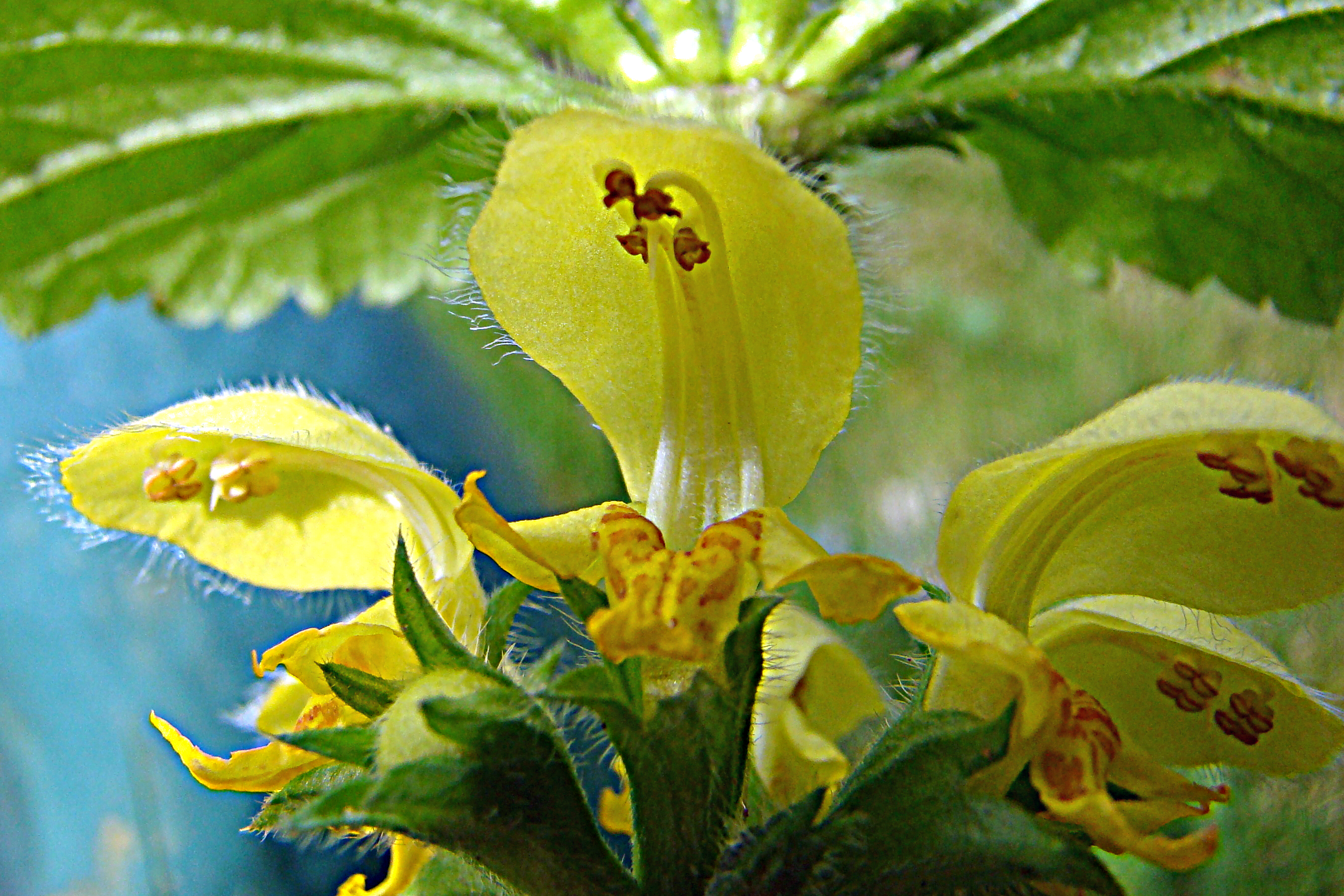
Flower cluster showing yellow petals, hooded flowers, and unequal stamens

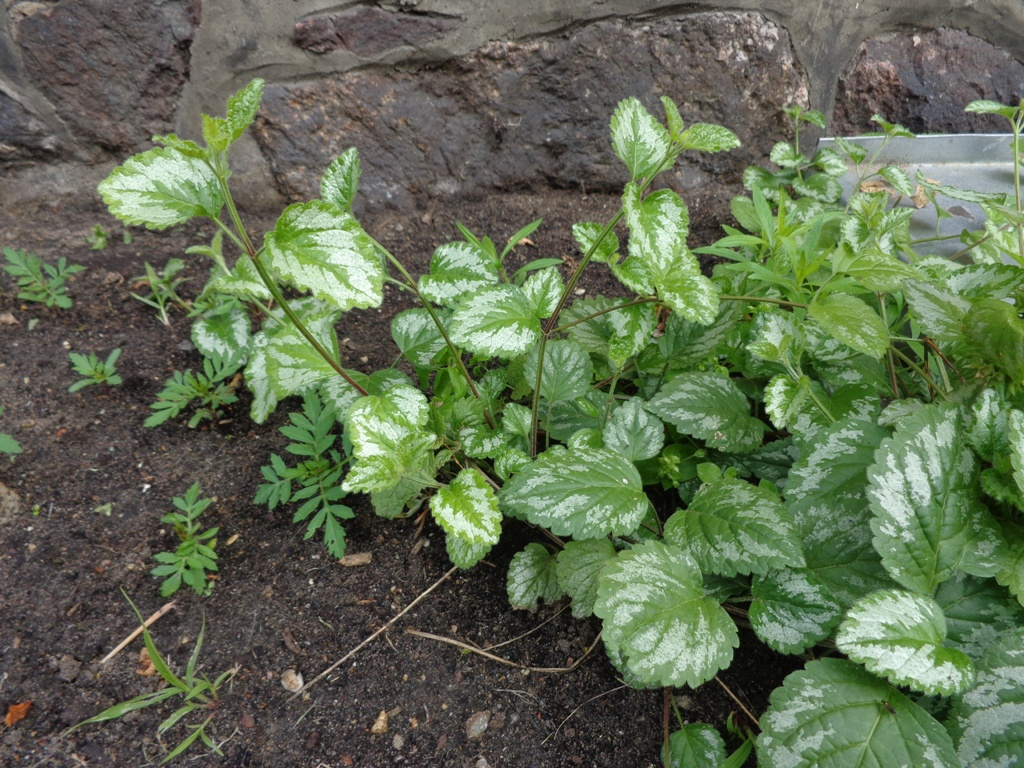
Leaves with silvery white variegated markings

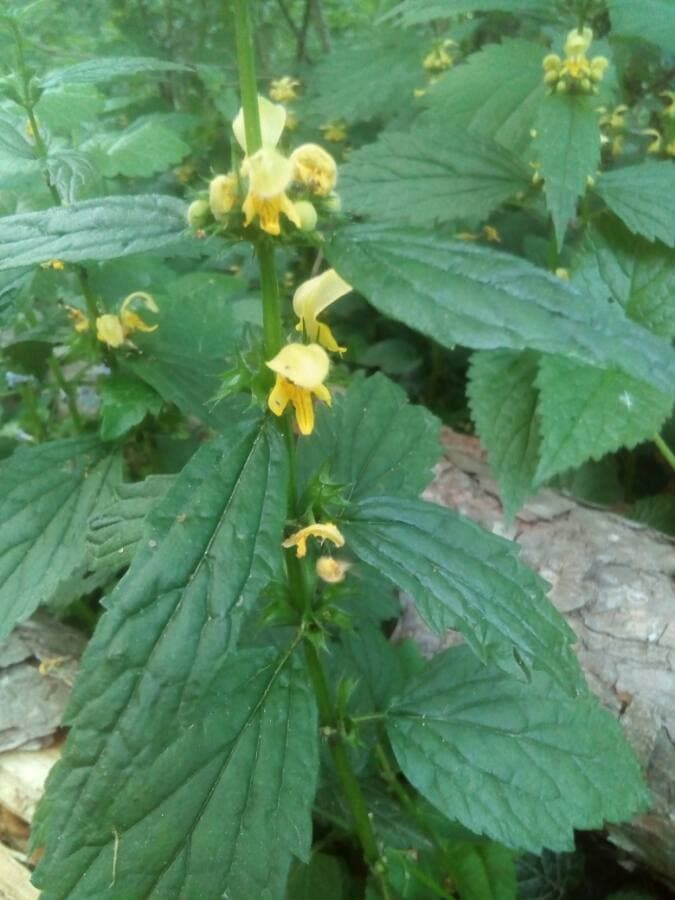
Plants without leaf variegation

== See also ==
- List of plants in The English Physitian

== Bibliography ==
- Atalay, Zeynep; Celep, Ferhat; Bilgili, Bilgehan; Doğan, Musa (2016). "Pollen morphology of the genus Lamium L. (Lamiaceae) and its systematic implications". Flora. 219: 68–84. Bibcode:2016FMDFE.219...68A. doi:10.1016/j.flora.2015.12.011. hdl:11511/48478. ISSN 0367-2530.
- Bendiksby, Mika; Brysting, Anne K.; Thorbek, Lisbeth; Gussarova, Galina; Ryding, Olof (August 2011). "Molecular phylogeny and taxonomy of the genus Lamium L. (Lamiaceae): Disentangling origins of presumed allotetraploids". Taxon. 60 (4): 986–1000. Bibcode:2011Taxon..60..986B. doi:10.1002/tax.604004. JSTOR 41317321.
- DeFelice, Michael S. (2005). "Henbit and the Deadnettles, Lamium spp.: Archangels or Demons?". Weed Technology. 19 (3): 768–774. Bibcode:2005WeedT..19..768D. doi:10.1614/WT-05-072.1. JSTOR 3989505.
- Gilman, Arthur V. (2015). New Flora of Vermont. Memoirs of The New York Botanical Garden, Volume 110. Bronx, New York, USA: The New York Botanical Garden Press. ISBN 978-0-89327-516-7.
- Gledhill, David (2008). The Names of Plants (4th ed.). Cambridge University Press. ISBN 978-0-521-86645-3.
- Holub, Josef (1970). "Lamiastrum versus Galeobdolon and Comments on Problems of Unitary Designations in Fabricius's Work 'Enumeratio methodica plantarum horti medici helmstadiensis'". Folia Geobotanica & Phytotaxonomica. 5 (1): 61–88. doi:10.1007/BF02851993. JSTOR 4179569.
- Krawczyk, Katarzyna; Korniak, Tadeusz; Sawicki, Jakub (2013). "Taxonomic status of Galeobdolon luteum Huds. (Lamiaceae) from classical taxonomy and phylogenetics perspectives". Acta Biologica Cracoviensia Series Botanica. 55 (2): 18–28. doi:10.2478/abcsb-2013-0016.
- Krawczyk, Katarzyna; Szczecińska, Monika; Sawicki, Jakub (2014). "Evaluation of 11 single-locus and seven multilocus DNA barcodes in Lamium L. (Lamiaceae)". Molecular Ecology Resources. 14 (2): 272–285. Bibcode:2014MolER..14..272K. doi:10.1111/1755-0998.12175. ISSN 1755-0998. PMID 24118979.
- Mennema, J. (1989). A taxonomic revision of Lamium (Lamiaceae) (PDF). Leiden Botanical Series. Vol. 11. Leiden, The Netherlands: E. J. Brill. pp. 1–196. ISBN 90-04-09109-2.
- Rosenbaumová, R.; Plačková, I.; Suda, J. (February 2004). "Variation in Lamium subg. Galeobdolon (Lamiaceae) — insights from ploidy levels, morphology and isozymes". Plant Systematics and Evolution. 244 (3/4): 219–244. Bibcode:2004PSyEv.244..219R. doi:10.1007/s00606-003-0071-5. JSTOR 23645275.
- Rusterholz, Hans-Peter; Huber, Katharina; Baur, Bruno (31 March 2023). "Invasion of a horticultural plant into forests: Lamium galeobdolon argentatum affects native above-ground vegetation and soil properties". Plants. 12 (7): 1527. Bibcode:2023Plnts..12.1527R. doi:10.3390/plants12071527. PMC 10097399. PMID 37050152. This article incorporates text available under the CC BY 4.0 license.
- Taylor, Brian; Glaister, Jim (2018). "Variegated Yellow Archangel Lamium galeobdolon subsp. argentatum". In Fennell, Mark; Jones, Laura; Wade, Max (eds.). Practical Management of Invasive Non-Native Weeds in Britain and Ireland. Liverpool University Press. pp. 103–104. doi:10.2307/j.ctv34h08r7. ISBN 978-1-85341-165-6. JSTOR j.ctv34h08r7.40.
- Zhao, Fei; Chen, Ya-Ping; Salmaki, Yasaman; Drew, Bryan T.; Wilson, Trevor C.; Scheen, Anne-Cathrine; Celep, Ferhat; Bräuchler, Christian; Bendiksby, Mika; Wang, Qiang; Min, Dao-Zhang; Peng, Hua; Olmstead, Richard G.; Li, Bo; Xiang, Chun-Lei (2021). "An updated tribal classification of Lamiaceae based on plastome phylogenomics". BMC Biology. 19 (1): 2. doi:10.1186/s12915-020-00931-z. PMC 7796571. PMID 33419433.
