= List of herbs with known adverse effects =

This is a partial list of herbs and herbal treatments with known or suspected adverse effects, either alone or in interaction with other herbs or drugs. Non-inclusion of an herb in this list does not imply that it is free of adverse effects. In general, the safety and effectiveness of alternative medicines have not been scientifically proven and remain largely unknown. Beyond adverse effects from the herb itself, "adulteration, inappropriate formulation, or lack of understanding of plant and drug interactions have led to adverse reactions that are sometimes life threatening or lethal."

Most of the adverse effects stated in this list are associated with only a small percentage of cases; they should be understood as potential risks rather than as certainties.

== Herbs, treatments, and constituents with known or suspected adverse effects ==
Name	Other common names	Scientific name	Adverse effects
Aconite	monkshood, wolfsbane, aconitum	Aconitum spp.	Heart palpitations and arrhythmias, hypotension, nausea, vomiting, abdominal pain, respiratory system paralysis, death
Aloe vera juice	medicinal aloe	Aloe vera	"abdominal pain, diarrhea, potentially carcinogenic, with others can potentiate cardiac glycosides and antiarrhythmic agents"
Anthranoid laxatives			"abdominal pain, diarrhea, potentially carcinogenic, with others can potentiate cardiac glycosides and antiarrhythmic agents"
Areca nut	betel nut	Areca catechu	"deterioration of psychosis in patients with preexisting psychiatric disorders"; known carcinogen contributing to cancer of the mouth, pharynx, esophagus and stomach when chewed.
Aristolochic acid (contained in herbs in the genus Aristolochia e.g. Aristolochia serpentaria (Virginia snakeroot), Aristolochia reticulata (Texas snakeroot) and in Chinese herbs such as Aristolochia fangchi and Aristolochia manshuriensis (banned in China and withdrawn from Chinese Pharmacopoea 2005; Stephania tetrandra and Magnolia officinalis do not contain aristolochic acid).			Kidney toxicity associated with kidney failure; associated with development of cancer, particularly of the urinary tract, known carcinogen
Atractylate		Atractylis gummifera	Liver damage, nausea, vomiting, epigastric and abdominal pain, diarrhoea, anxiety, headache and convulsions, often followed by coma
Ayurvedic Herbo-mineral (Rasashastra) Medicines			Heavy metal contamination
Bitter orange			'Fainting, arrhythmia, heart attack, stroke, death'
Broom	broom flower, dyer's broom, dyer's greenwood, dyer's weed, dyer's whin, furze, green broom, greenweed, wood waxen	Genista tinctoria	Uterotonic properties, nausea vomiting, and diarrhea, contraindicated for pregnancy and breast feeding
Buckthorn bark and berry	alder buckthorn	Rhamnus frangula	"abdominal pain, diarrhea, potentially carcinogenic, with others can potentiate cardiac glycosides and antiarrhythmic agents"
Cascara sagrada bark	bearberry	Rhamnus purshiana	"abdominal pain, diarrhea, potentially carcinogenic, with others can potentiate cardiac glycosides and antiarrhythmic agents"
Chaparral	creosote bush, gobernadora, larreastat	Larrea tridentata, Larrea divaricata	Liver damage, kidney problems, Hypotension in cancer patients
Chinese herbal mixtures			Heavy metal poisoning
Coltsfoot	coughwort, farfarae folium leaf, foalswort	Tussilago farfara	Liver damage, cancer
Comfrey	comphrey, blackwort, common comfrey, slippery root	Symphytum officinale	Liver damage, cancer
Country mallow	heartleaf, silky white mallow	Sida cordifolia	"Heart attack, heart arrhythmia, stroke, death"
Dan Shen	red sage, Chinese sage, tan shen	Salvia miltiorrhiza	Potentiates warfarin activity, leading to excessive anticoagulation and bleeding
Dong quai	female ginseng	Angelica sinensis	May induce uterine contractions; contraindicated when pregnant or nursing
European Mistletoe	common mistletoe	Viscum album	Toxic to cardio and central nervous systems, gastrointestinal bleeding
Ephedra	ma huang	Ephedra sinica	Agitation and palpitations, "hypertension, irregular heart rate, insomnia, nervousness, tremors and seizures, paranoid psychosis, heart attacks, strokes, and death", kidney stones
Flavonoids (contained in many medicinal plants)	Vitamin P, citrin	Flavonoids, bioflavonoids	Hemolytic anemia, kidney damage
Germander		Teucrium	Liver damage
Ginger		Zingiber officinale	May increase the risk of bleeding
Ginkgo	gingko	Ginkgo biloba	Bleeding
American Ginseng	American Ginseng, Canadian Ginseng, Ginseng, Ginseng Root, North American Ginseng, Occidental Ginseng, Ontario Ginseng, Panax quinquefolium, Panax quinquefolius, Red Berry, Ren Shen, Sang, Shang, Shi Yang Seng, Wisconsin Ginseng	Panax quinquefolius	"Hypertensive and chronotropic activities, may increase digoxin levels", diarrhea, itching, insomnia, headaches, nervousness, rapid heartbeat, hypertension or hypotension, breast tenderness, vaginal bleeding. Very rarely Stevens–Johnson syndrome, liver damage, severe allergy has been reported May lower blood sugar excessively in combination with diabetes medication. Contains a chemical linked to possible birth defects. May worsen hormone sensitive conditions such as breast cancer, uterine cancer, ovarian cancer, endometriosis, and uterine fibroids. Insomnia.
Goldenseal	orangeroot, yellow puccoon	Hydrastis canadensis	Uterotonic
Greater celandine	celandine	Chelidonium majus	Liver damage
Guarana		Paullinia cupana	Agitation and insomnia
Guar gum	guaran		Obstruction of gastrointestinal tract
Gugulipid	guggal, guggul, Mukul myrrh tree	Commiphora mukul	"Headache, nausea, hiccups, diminished efficacy of other cardiovascular drugs including diltiazem and propranolol"
Hawthorn	common hawthorn, may, mayblossom, maythorn, quickthorn, whitethorn, motherdie, haw	Crataegus monogyna	"Potentiates digitalis activity, increases coronary dilation effects of theophylline, caffeine, papaverine, sodium nitrate, adenosine and epinephrine, increase barbiturate-induced sleeping times"
Horse chestnut	conker tree, conker	Aesculus hippocastanum	Liver toxicity, allergic reaction, anaphylaxis
Kava	awa, kava-kava	Piper methysticum	Potentiates CNS sedatives, chronic use might cause a reversible dry skin condition.
Khat	qat	Catha edulis	Chronic liver dysfunction
Kratom		Mitragyna speciosa	Hepatotoxicity
Liquorice root		Glycyrrhiza glabra	Hypokalemia, hypertension, arrhythmias, edema
Lobelia	asthma weed, pukeweed, vomit wort	Lobelia inflata	Toxicity, rapid heartbeat, hypotension, coma, death
Milk thistle	Marian thistle	Silybum marianum	Mild laxative, allergy
Pennyroyal		Mentha pulegium	Liver damage
Peony	Bai Shao, Chi Shao, Chinese peony, common peony, coral peony, Cortex Moutan, European peony, Jiu Chao Bai Shao, Moutan, Mu Dan PI, peony flower, peony root, piney, radix peony, red peony, Shakuyaku, Shao Yao, tree peony, Ud Saleeb, Udsalam, Udsalap, White Peony	Radix Paeoniae, Radix Paeoniae Alba, Radix Paeoniae Rubra, Paeonia, Paeonia alba, Paeonia lactiflora, Paeonia mascula; Paeonia obovata; Paeonia officinalis; Paeonia suffruticosa, Paeonia veitchii, Paeoniae Flos, Paeoniae Radix	May slow clotting; contraindicated for people with bleeding disorders and before and after surgery. May induce uterine contractions; contraindicated when pregnant or nursing.
Pyrrolizidine alkaloids (contained in comfrey, borage, senecio, coltsfoot, and others)			Liver damage
Reserpine		Rauvolfia serpentina	"Sedation, inability to complete tasks, mental depression, nasal congestion, increased gastric secretion and mild diarrhea"
Safrole		Sassafras albidum	Liver damage
Saw palmetto		Serenoa repens	"rare and mild gastrointestinal upset, headaches, diarrhea, gynecomastia, paroxysmal atrial fibrillation, ventricular rupture and death in one patient"
Senna	Egyptian senna	Senna alexandrina (Cassia senna)	"abdominal pain, diarrhea, potentially carcinogenic, with others can potentiate cardiac glycosides and antiarrhythmic agents", liver damage
St John's wort	Tipton's weed, Klamath weed	Hypericum perforatum	Photosensitization, GI disturbances, "allergic reactions, fatigue, dizziness, confusion, dry mouth"
Valerian	garden valerian, garden heliotrope, all-heal	Valeriana officinalis	"drowsiness, GI upset, headache, palpitations, insomnia", oversedation, overstimulation
Vasambu	sweet flag	Acorus calamus	Vomiting and nausea
Yohimbe	yohimbine	Pausinystalia johimbe	rapid heart rate, hypertension, hypotension, heart problems, death

== Herbs with adverse drug interactions ==
Name	Other common names	Scientific name	Drug	Adverse effects
Cinchona bark		Cinchona pubescens	Warfarin	Possible additive effect
Chamomile			Blood thinners	
Devil's Claw	grapple plant, wood spider	Harpagophytum	Warfarin	Additive effect
Ephedra		Ephedra	Caffeine, decongestants, stimulants	Increases sympathomimetic effect of ephedra
Feverfew	featherfew	Tanacetum parthenium	Aspirin	Additive effect
Garlic		Allium sativum	Warfarin	Additive effect
Ginger		Zingiber officinale	Warfarin	Additive effect, causes iris bleeding
Ginkgo	gingko	Ginkgo biloba	Aspirin, warfarin, ticlopidine, clopidogrel, dipyridamole, garlic, vitamin E	With aspirin – retards aspirin absorption
Ginseng		Panax ginseng	Warfarin	
Papaya extract		Carica papaya	Warfarin	Damage to GI tract mucous membranes
Kava	kava-kava	Piper methysticum	Sedatives, sleeping pills, antipsychotics, alcohol	
Milkvetch		Astragalus	Astragalus may interact with medications that suppress the immune system, such as cyclophosphamide.	It may also affect blood sugar levels and blood pressure.
Pineapple enzyme		Ananas comosus	Bromelain	"Diarrhea, increased tendency for bleeding if used simultaneously with anticoagulants and inhibitors of thrombocytic aggregation due to modulation of the arachidonate cascade"
Psyllium seed		Plantago spp	Coumarin derivates	Retards absorption of drug
St John's wort	Tipton's weed, Klamath weed	Hypericum perforatum	Antidepressants, warfarin, protease inhibitors for HIV, birth control, some asthma drugs, and many other medications	

== Herbal plants associated with allergic reactions ==
- Angelica
- Aniseed
- Apricot
- Arnica
- Artichoke
- Asafoetida
- Boneset
- Cassia
- Celery
- Cinnamon
- Cowslip
- Dandelion
- Elecampane
- Euphorbia
- Feverfew
- Filipendula
- Fucus
- Gravel root
- Guaiacum
- Holy Thistle
- Hops
- Hydrangea
- Hydrocotyle
- Juniper
- Lady's slipper
- Milk thistle
- Motherwort
- Parsley
- Pilewort
- Plantain
- Pulsatilla
- Rosemary
- Tansy
- Vitex agnus-castus
- Wild carrot
- Yarrow

== See also ==
- Alternative medicine
- Herbalism
- List of branches of alternative medicine
- List of plants used in herbalism
- List of poisonous plants
