= List of medicinal plants of the American West =

Many plants that grow in the American West have use in traditional and herbal medicine.

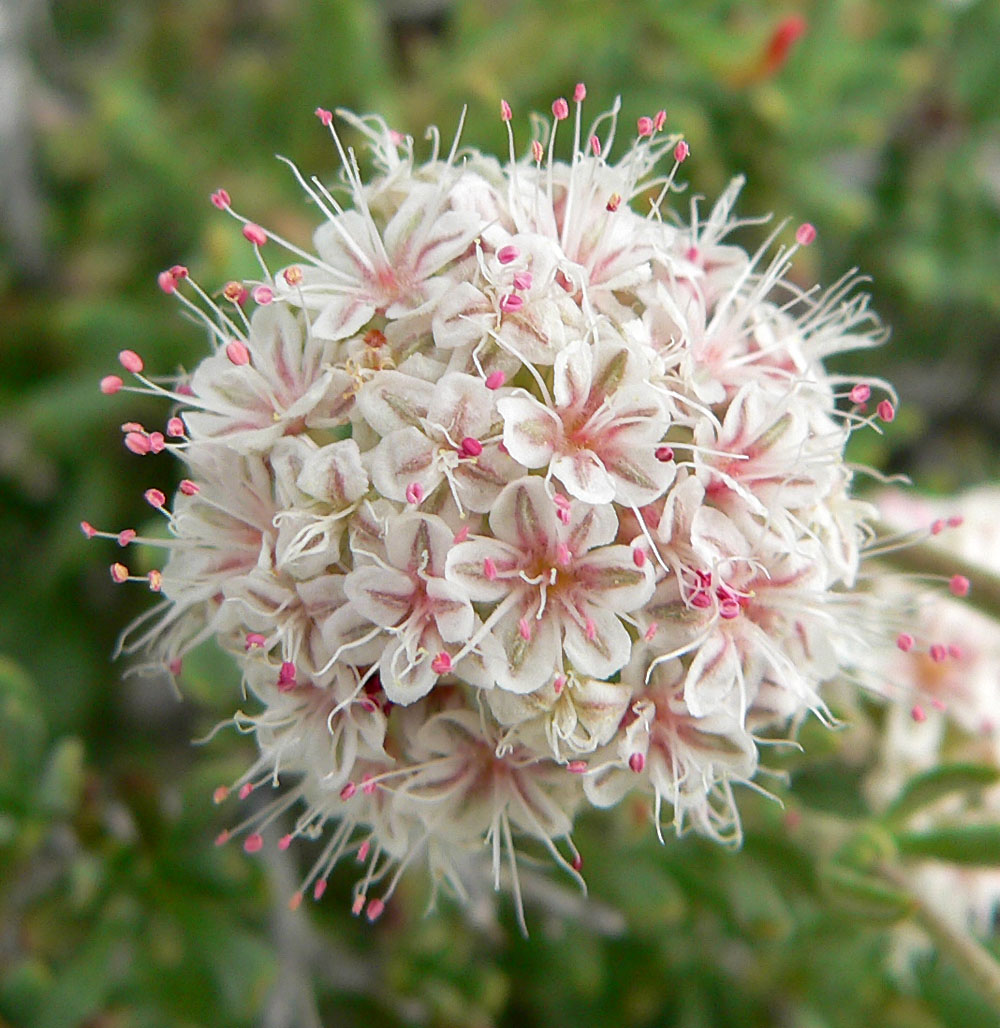
Eriogonum fasciculatum, used in treatment of headaches and diarrhea.

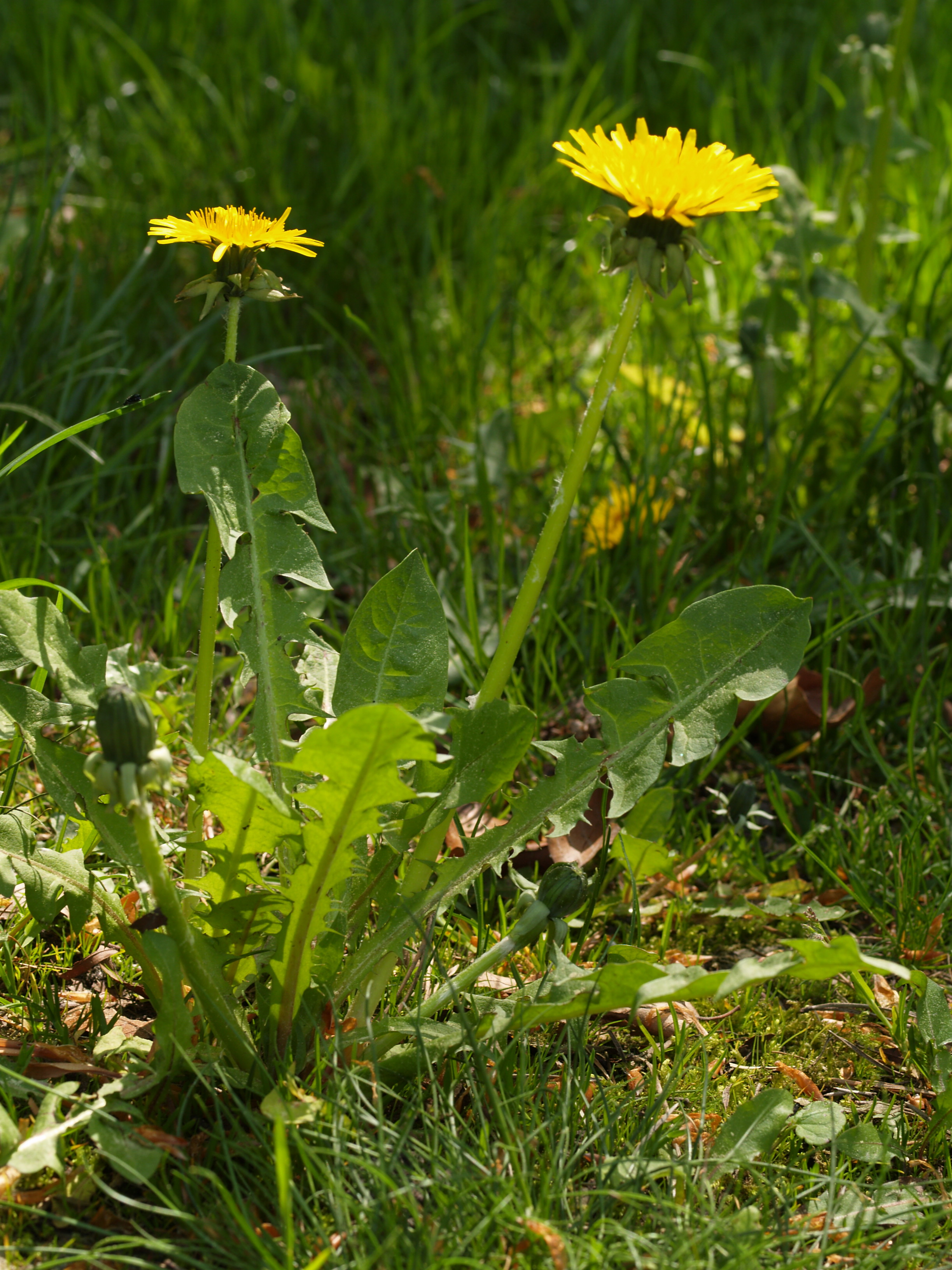
Dandelion (Taraxacum officinale) contains a large number of pharmacologically active compounds, and has been used for centuries as an effective laxative and diuretic, and as a treatment for bile or liver problems.

== List of medicinal plants ==
- Black sage, (Salvia mellifera), can be used against pain. A strong sun tea of the leaves and stems of the plant can be rubbed on the painful area or used to soak one's feet. The plant contains diterpenoids, such as aethiopinone and ursolic acid, that are pain relievers.
- Broadleaf plantain (Plantago major) is one of the most abundant and widely distributed medicinal crops in the world. A poultice of the leaves can be applied to wounds, stings, and sores in order to facilitate healing and prevent infection. The active chemical constituents are aucubin (an anti-microbial agent), allantoin (which stimulates cellular growth and tissue regeneration), and mucilage (which reduces pain and discomfort). Plantain has astringent properties, and a tea made from the leaves can be ingested to treat diarrhea and soothe raw internal membranes.
- California bay (Umbellularia californica) leaves were used by the Tongva people to treat pain.
- California poppy (Eschscholzia californica) was chewed by California Indians to treat toothache and to decrease milk production in nursing mothers anti-galactogogue.
- Ephedra spp. is used as a diuretic, as a treatment for urinary tract infections, for asthma, and as stimulant due to the presence of ephedrine and other compounds. The sale of dietary supplements containing ephedra has been banned in the United States due to the risk of serious adverse events or death.
- Horsetail or Scouring Rush (Equisetum spp.) is used as a diuretic because of it contains high concentrations of oxalic acid and calcium oxalate and therefore can also be a throat irritant if brewed improperly.
- Matilija poppy, (Romneya coulteri) is applied topically to treat sunburn.
- Willow Salix spp. used to treat headache and as an antipyretic due to the content of salicylic acid.
- Yarrow (Achillea millefolium) is used for various ailments including cramps, fevers, and toothache.

== See also ==
- List of plants used in herbalism
- Traditional medicine
- Herbalism
