= Moneywort =

Moneywort is a common name for several plants and may refer to:

- Alysicarpus
- Bacopa crenata
- Bacopa monnieri
- Lunaria annua
- Lysimachia nummularia
- Sibthorpia europaea
