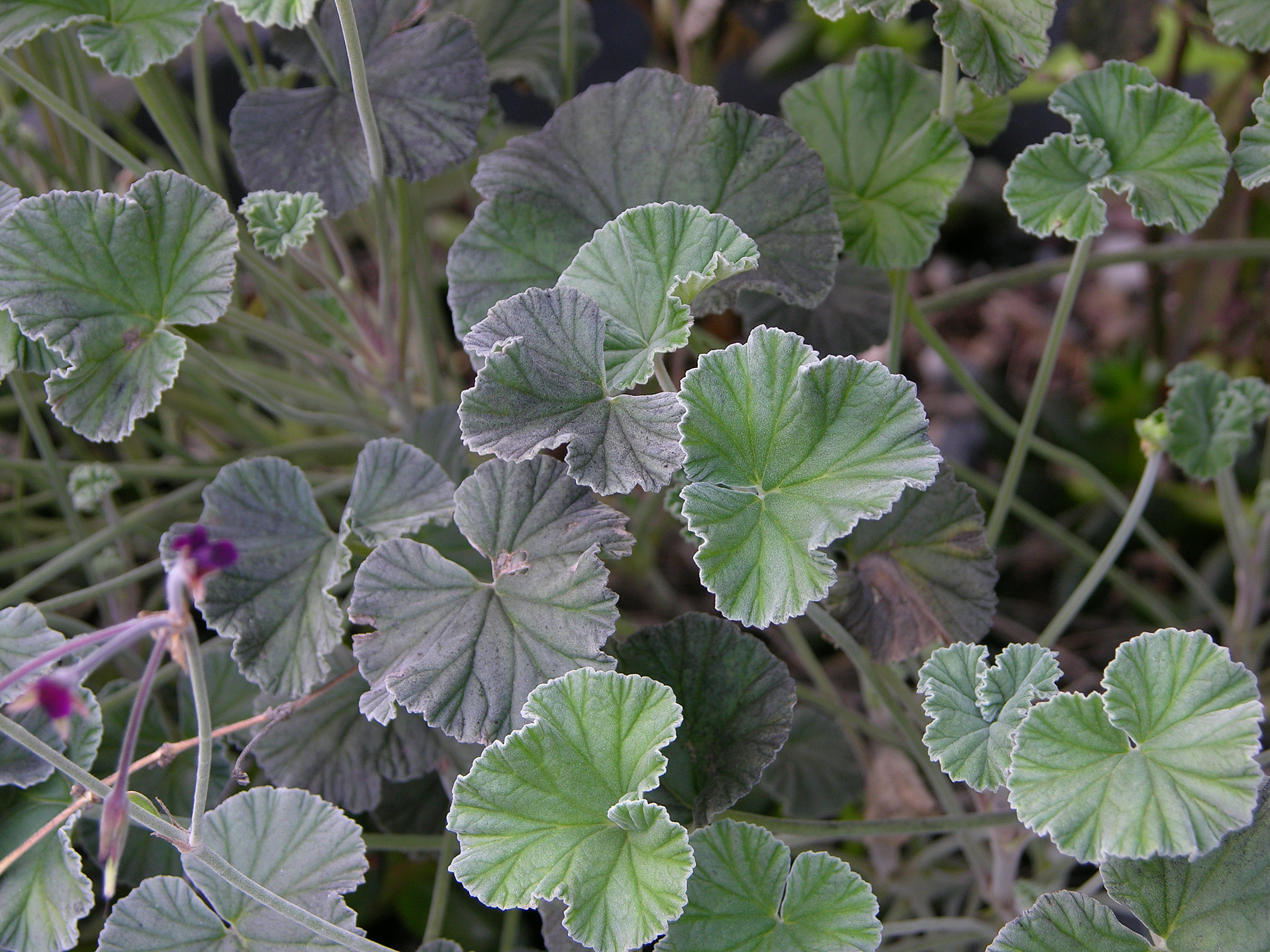

Conservation status
- Least Concern (IUCN 3.1)

Scientific classification
- Kingdom: Plantae
- Clade: Tracheophytes
- Clade: Angiosperms
- Clade: Eudicots
- Clade: Rosids
- Order: Geraniales
- Family: Geraniaceae
- Genus: Pelargonium
- Species: P. sidoides

Binomial name
- Pelargonium sidoides DC.

= Pelargonium sidoides =

Species of flowering plant

Pelargonium sidoides is a plant native to South Africa, Eswatini, and Lesotho. Its common names include African geranium and South African geranium.

The current conservation status is Least Concern.

== Description ==
African geranium forms a basal rosette of cordate leaves with a velvet texture and a few short trichomes on long petioles. Its flowers have five dark red to nearly black petals, two of which are sometimes fused. It is often found in flower nearly year-round. It prefers to grow in grasslands with rocky soils. It can be difficult to distinguish from Pelargonium reniforme which grows in a similar area, but tends to have more kidney-shaped leaves.

== Uses ==
In cultivation in the UK, Pelargonium sidoides has received the Royal Horticultural Society's Award of Garden Merit. If grown as a perennial it requires protection in winter, as it does not tolerate temperatures below 5 °C (41 °F). It needs a sunny, sheltered position.

A 2013 Cochrane review found limited to no evidence of benefit with Pelargonium sidoides root extract for the symptoms of acute bronchitis, the common cold and acute rhinosinusitis. A summary of this review found that all studies were "from the same investigator (the manufacturer) and performed in the same region (Ukraine and Russia)."

Root extract of Pelargonium sidoides may be sold as a dietary supplement or traditional medicine under various brand names, but there is no high-quality clinical evidence that it provides any therapeutic effect.

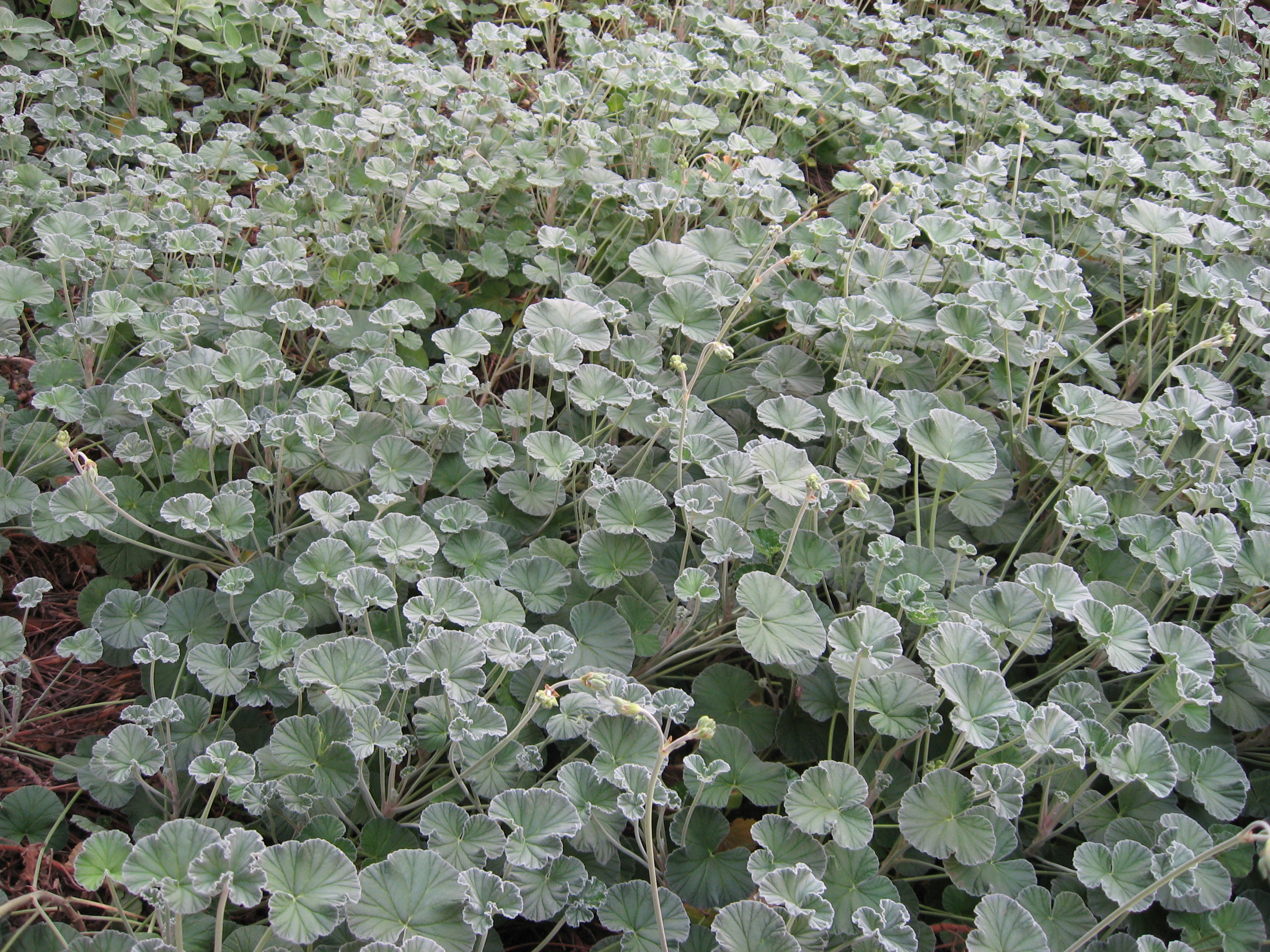
Pelargonium as groundcover
