= Blite =

Blite could refer to any one of the following plants:

- Amaranthus blitum
- Strawberry blite (Chenopodium capitatum, formerly of the genus Blitum)
- Chenopodium bonus-henricus
- Some species of Atriplex
- Coastblite goosefoot
- Sea blite (aka plant genus Suaeda)

Not to be confused with blight, a symptom of plant disease.
