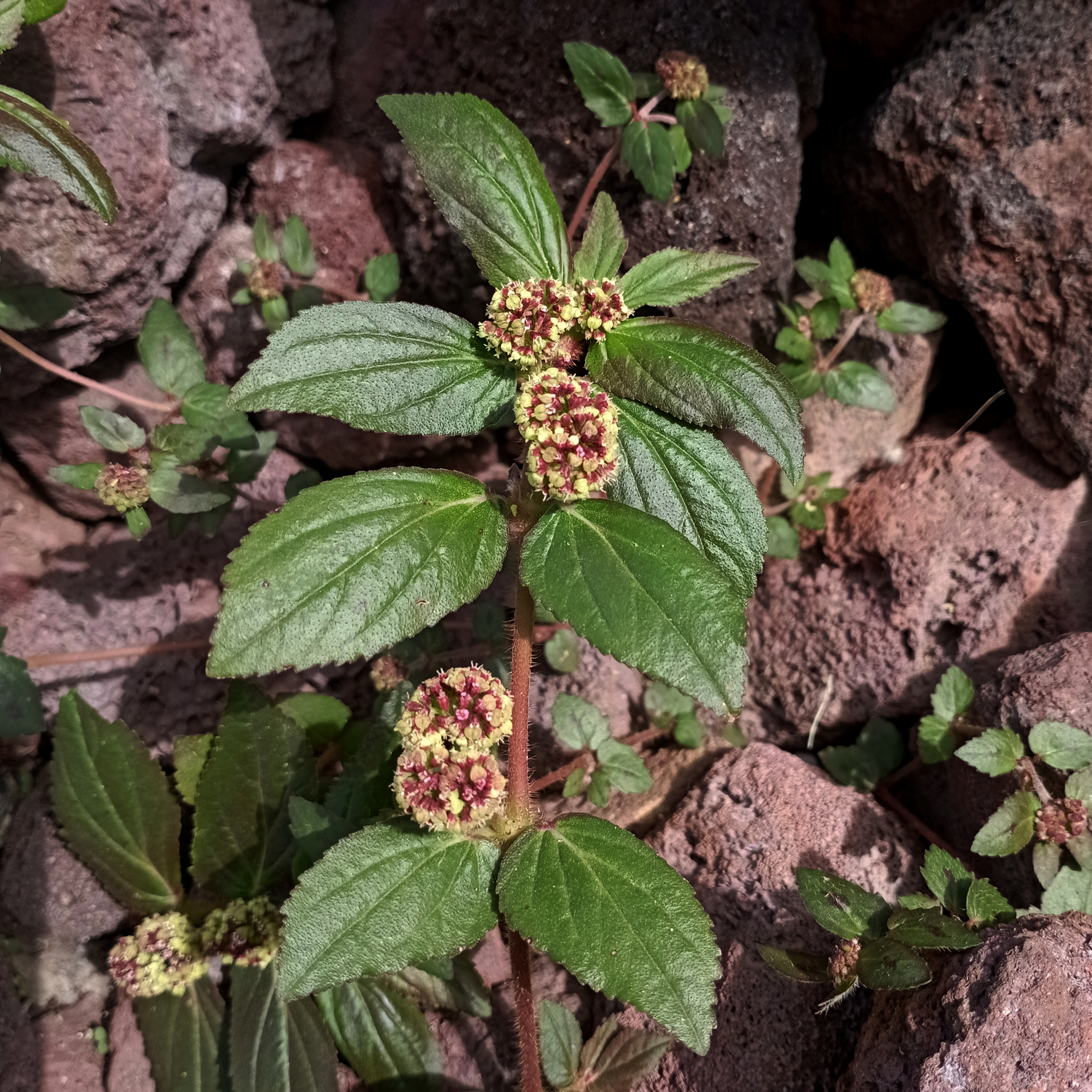

Scientific classification
- Kingdom: Plantae
- Clade: Embryophytes
- Clade: Tracheophytes
- Clade: Spermatophytes
- Clade: Angiosperms
- Clade: Eudicots
- Clade: Rosids
- Order: Malpighiales
- Family: Euphorbiaceae
- Genus: Euphorbia
- Species: E. hirta

Binomial name
- Euphorbia hirta L.

Synonyms
- List: Chamaesyce hirta; Desmonema hirta; Ditrita hirta; Euphorbia hirta var. typica; Euphorbia pilulifera var. hirta

= Euphorbia hirta =

Plant species in the spurge family

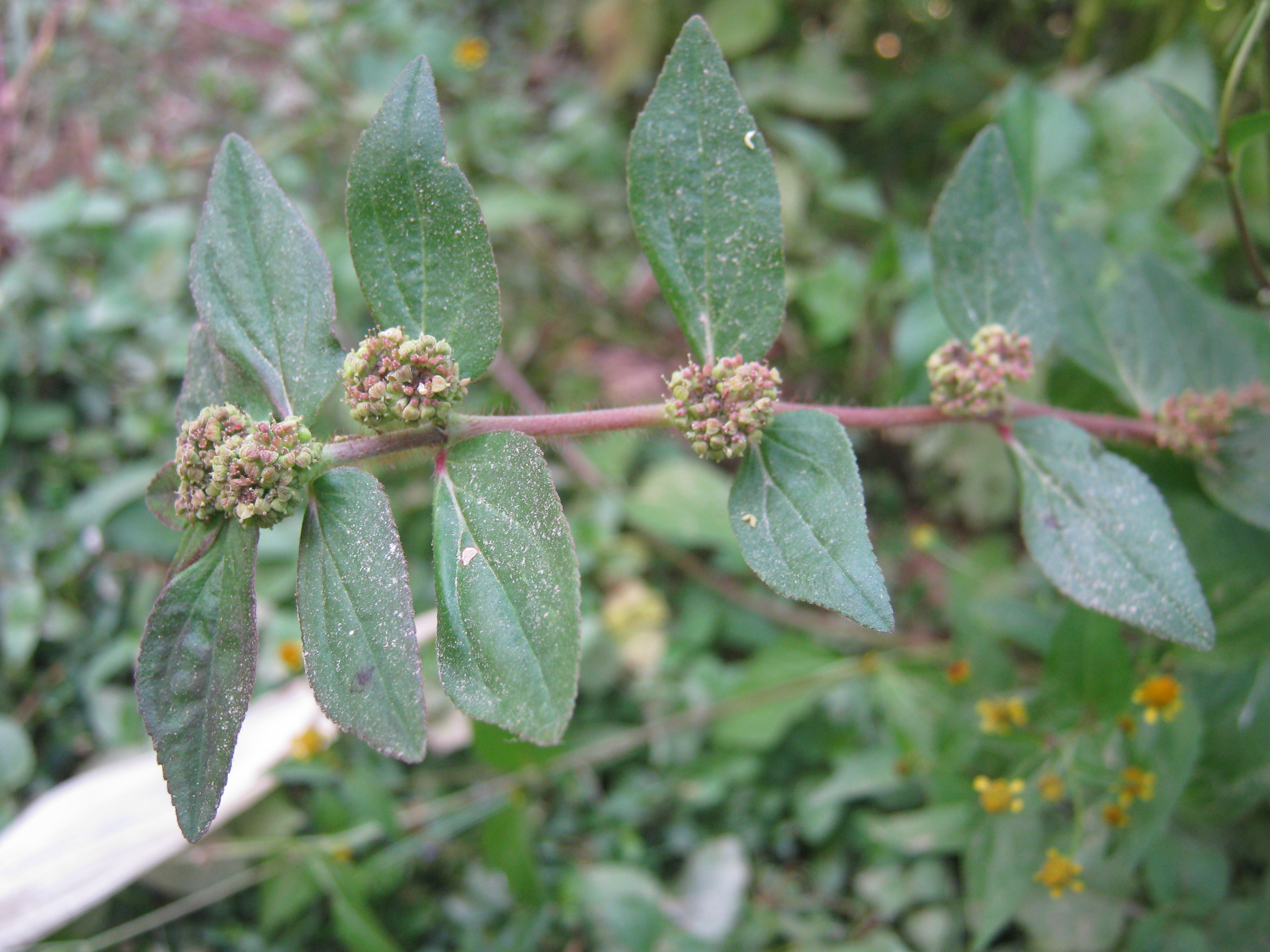
Euphorbia hirta in Panchkhal valley

Euphorbia hirta (sometimes called asthma-plant) is a pantropical weed, originating from the tropical regions of the Americas. It is a hairy herb that grows in open grasslands, roadsides and pathways. It is widely used in traditional herbal medicine across many cultures, particularly for asthma, skin ailments, and hypertension. It is also consumed in herbal tea form as folk medicine for fevers in the Philippines (where it is known as tawa-tawa), particularly for dengue fever and malaria.

== Description ==
This erect or prostrate annual herb can grow up to 60 cm (24 in) long with a solid stem that is furnished with many yellow to reddish coarse hairs, and produces an abundant white latex. There are stipules present. The leaves have an oblique base and are simple, elliptical to slightly rhombic, hairy (on both upper and lower surfaces but particularly on the veins on the lower leaf surface), with a finely dentate margin, the veins upperside being deep-set and conspicuous on the underside, and the leaf surface somewhat leathery. Leaves occur in opposite pairs on the stem. The flowers are unisexual and found in axillary cymes at each leaf node, held as dense balls of flowers and fruit capsules usually close to the stem, the flower glands with tiny white/pinkish petal-like appendages. The fruit is a capsule with three valves (creating 3 sides), uniformly appressed hairy, containing tiny (0.7–0.9 mm), oblong, four-sided orange to pink or red seeds. It has a white or brown taproot. FNA

== Taxonomy ==
Euphorbia hirta was given its scientific name by Carl Linnaeus in 1753. It continues to be classified in the genus Euphorbia within the family Euphorbiaceae. It has no accepted varieties, but has some among its 33 synonyms.

Table of Synonyms
Name	Year	Rank	Notes
Chamaesyce gemella (Lag.) Small	1913	species	= het.
Chamaesyce hirta (L.) Millsp.	1909	species	≡ hom.
Chamaesyce hirta var. glaberrima (Koidz.) H.Hara	1940	variety	= het.
Chamaesyce hirta f. glaberrima (Koidz.) Hurus.	1954	form	= het.
Chamaesyce hirta var. laeticincta Croizat	1943	variety	= het.
Chamaesyce hirta f. litoralis Hurus.	1954	form	= het.
Chamaesyce karwinskyi (Boiss.) Millsp.	1916	species	= het.
Chamaesyce pekinensis var. glaberrima (Koidz.) Makino & Nemoto	1925	variety	= het.
Chamaesyce pilulifera var. glaberrima (Koidz.) H.Hara	1938	variety	= het.
Chamaesyce rosei Millsp.	1916	species	= het.
Desmonema hirta (L.) Raf.	1833	species	≡ hom.
Ditrita hirta (L.) Raf.	1838	species	≡ hom.
Euphorbia bancana Miq.	1861	species	= het.
Euphorbia capitata Lam.	1788	species	= het.
Euphorbia chrysochaeta W.Fitzg.	1918	species	= het.
Euphorbia gemella Lag.	1816	species	= het.
Euphorbia globulifera Kunth	1817	species	= het.
Euphorbia hirta var. destituta L.C.Wheeler	1939	variety	= het.
Euphorbia hirta var. glaberrima Koidz.	1919	variety	= het.
Euphorbia hirta var. typica L.C.Wheeler	1939	variety	≡ hom., not validly publ.
Euphorbia karwinskyi Boiss.	1860	species	= het.
Euphorbia nodiflora Steud.	1840	species	= het.
Euphorbia obliterata Jacq.	1760	species	= het.
Euphorbia pilulifera var. arechavaletae Herter	1910	variety	= het.
Euphorbia pilulifera var. discolor Engelm.	1859	variety	= het.
Euphorbia pilulifera var. glabrescens Thell.	1917	variety	= het.
Euphorbia pilulifera var. guaranitica Chodat & Hassl.	1905	variety	= het.
Euphorbia pilulifera var. hirta (L.) Thell.	1917	variety	≡ hom.
Euphorbia pilulifera f. humifusa Domin	1927	form	= het.
Euphorbia pilulifera var. obliterata (Jacq.) Hitchc.	1893	variety	= het.
Euphorbia pilulifera f. rubromaculata Domin	1927	form	= het.
Euphorbia pilulifera f. viridis Domin	1927	form	= het.
Euphorbia verticillata Vell.	1829	species	= het., nom. illeg.
Notes: ≡ homotypic synonym; = heterotypic synonym

=== Names ===
Euphorbia hirta has many common names including garden spurge, pillpod spurge, and hairy spurge. It is also called by the related names asthma weed, asthma plant and Queensland asthma weed. Additionally it is known as red milkweed and snakeweed.

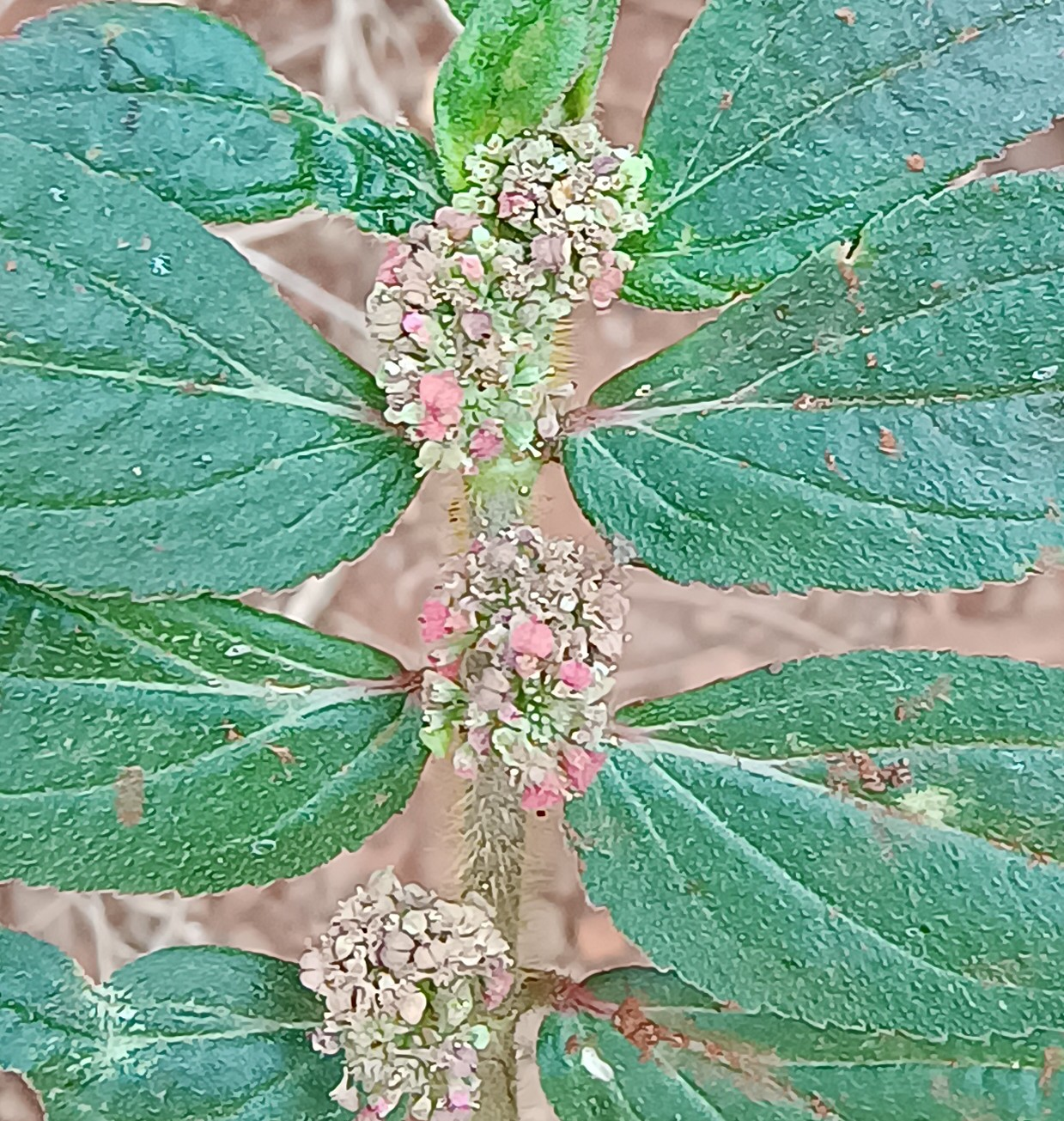
Flowers of Euphorbia hirta

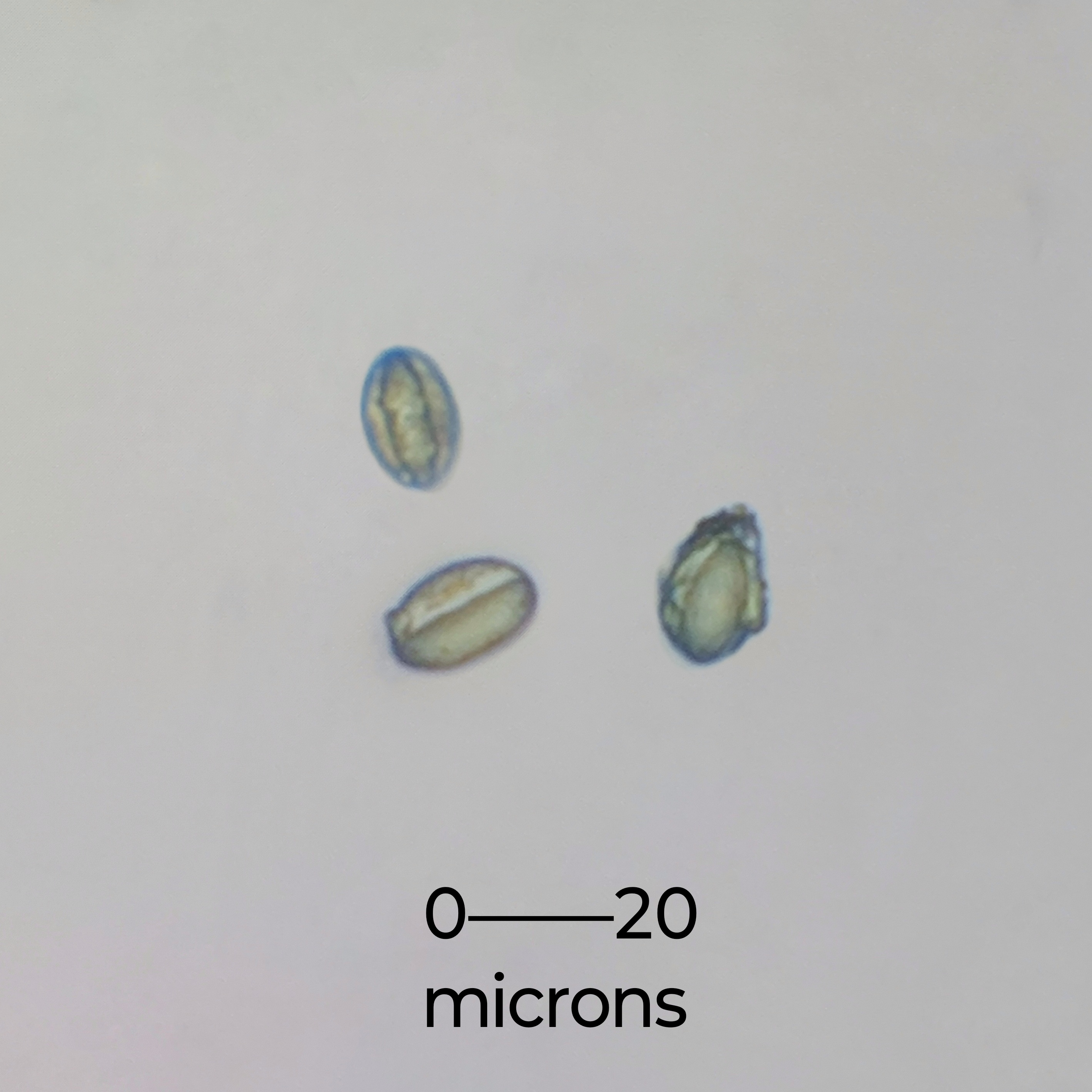
Pollen grains of Euphorbia hirta
