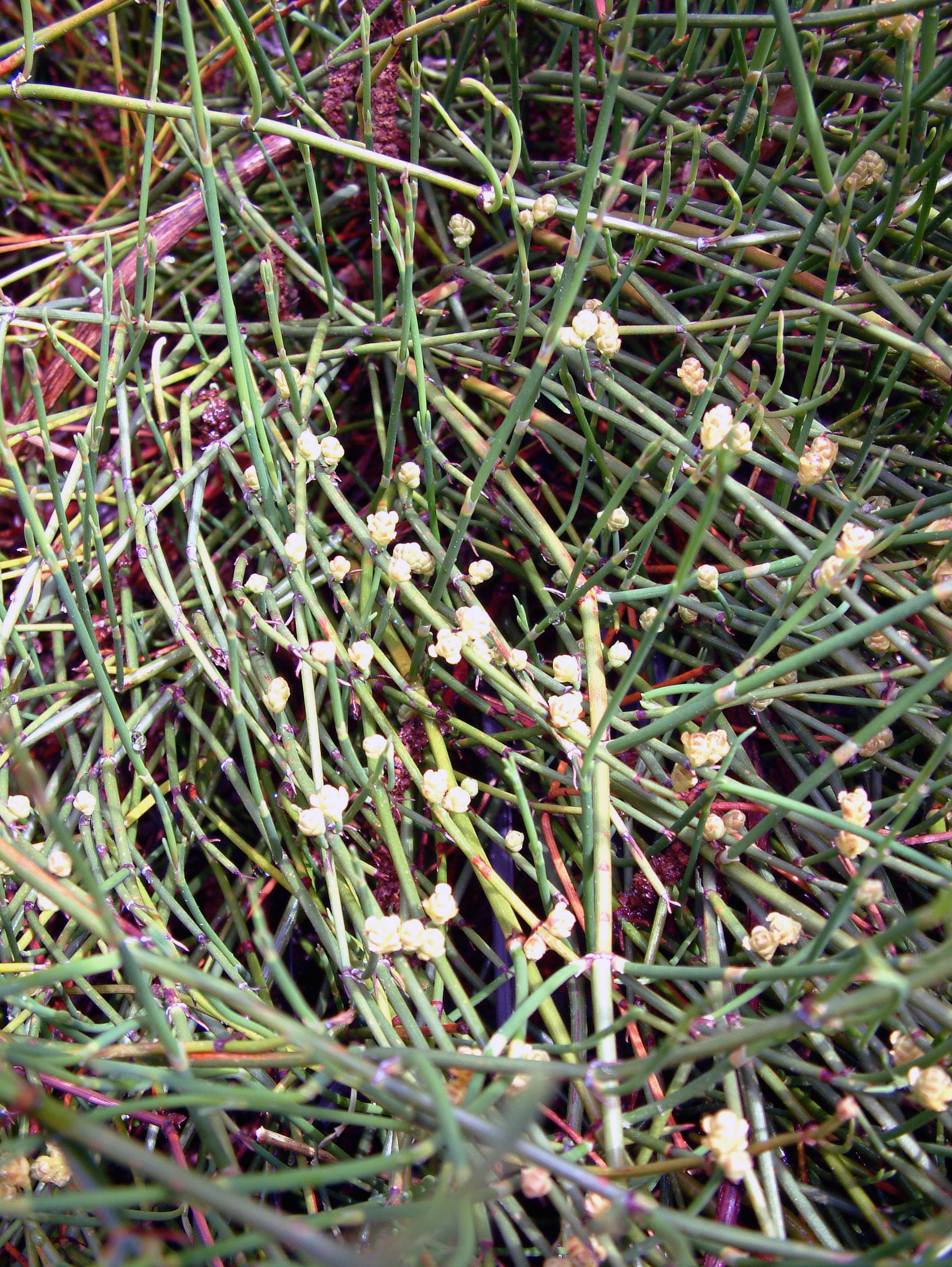
- Ephedra sinica

Conservation status
- Least Concern (IUCN 3.1)

Scientific classification
- Kingdom: Plantae
- Clade: Embryophytes
- Clade: Tracheophytes
- Clade: Spermatophytes
- Clade: Gymnosperms
- Division: Pinophyta
- Class: Pinopsida
- Subclass: Gnetidae
- Order: Ephedrales
- Family: Ephedraceae
- Genus: Ephedra
- Species: E. sinica

Binomial name
- Ephedra sinica Stapf

Synonyms
- Ephedra flava F.P.Sm.; Ephedra ma-huang Tang S.Liu

= Ephedra sinica =

Chinese ephedra (Cao Ma Huang—草麻黄)

Species of plant

Ephedra sinica (also known as Chinese ephedra or ma huang) is a species of Ephedra in the plant family Ephedraceae. Native to Mongolia, northern China, and Russia, it is a shrub found on arid highland slopes, dry river beds, steppes, fields or mountain sides.

E. sinica contains alkaloids, including ephedrine, which have been a basis for using the plant in traditional medicine for thousands of years. Due to concerns about alkaloid toxicity, ephedrine has been banned from the market in the European Union, United States, and many other countries.

== Description ==
E. sinica is a dioecious evergreen shrub, a gymnosperm closely related to conifers, with small leaves on green stems. The plant grows on shrublands, forests, and mountainsides between elevations of 400–1,600 m (1,300–5,200 ft).

The stems and leaves are collected and dried for use, whereas the roots, known as "ma huang gen", are used in Chinese traditional medicine. E. sinica has a strong pine odor and its taste is astringent, accounting for its Chinese name, ma huang, meaning "yellow astringent" or "yellow hemp".

E. sinica is a common plant in a stable population listed as least concern on the IUCN Red List of Threatened Species. It is widely cultivated, although the status of wild harvesting is unknown and a significant threat.

=== Composition ===
Ephedra contains diverse alkaloids, among which ephedrine has a phenethylamine structure. Ephedrine has sympathomimetic properties.

== Uses ==
Alkaloid extracts of the E. sinica plant contain ephedrine, which is the active ingredient for its intended therapeutic effects in traditional medicine, and for its adverse effects.

=== Traditional medicine and dietary supplement ===
E. sinica is the primary source of ephedra as used in ma huang, a practice applied over many millennia in China since 2800 BC. In traditional medicine, ephedra is intended to treat colds and other minor respiratory ailments, fever, and headaches. As a dietary supplement, it has been used to aid athletic performance and to lose weight.

=== Adverse effects ===
Even when used for short periods in low doses, ephedra has been linked to harmful effects, including sudden hypertension, heart attack, seizures, and stroke; it can be life-threatening or disabling.

== See also ==
- List of herbs with known adverse effects
