= Pilewort =

Pilewort is a common name for plants that were traditionally used to treat piles.(hemorrhoids) This herb was more commonly used throughout the Tudor period in England. Pilewort may refer to

- Erechtites hieracifolia, or burnweed, a plant in the aster family
- Ficaria verna, or lesser celandine, a plant in the buttercup family
