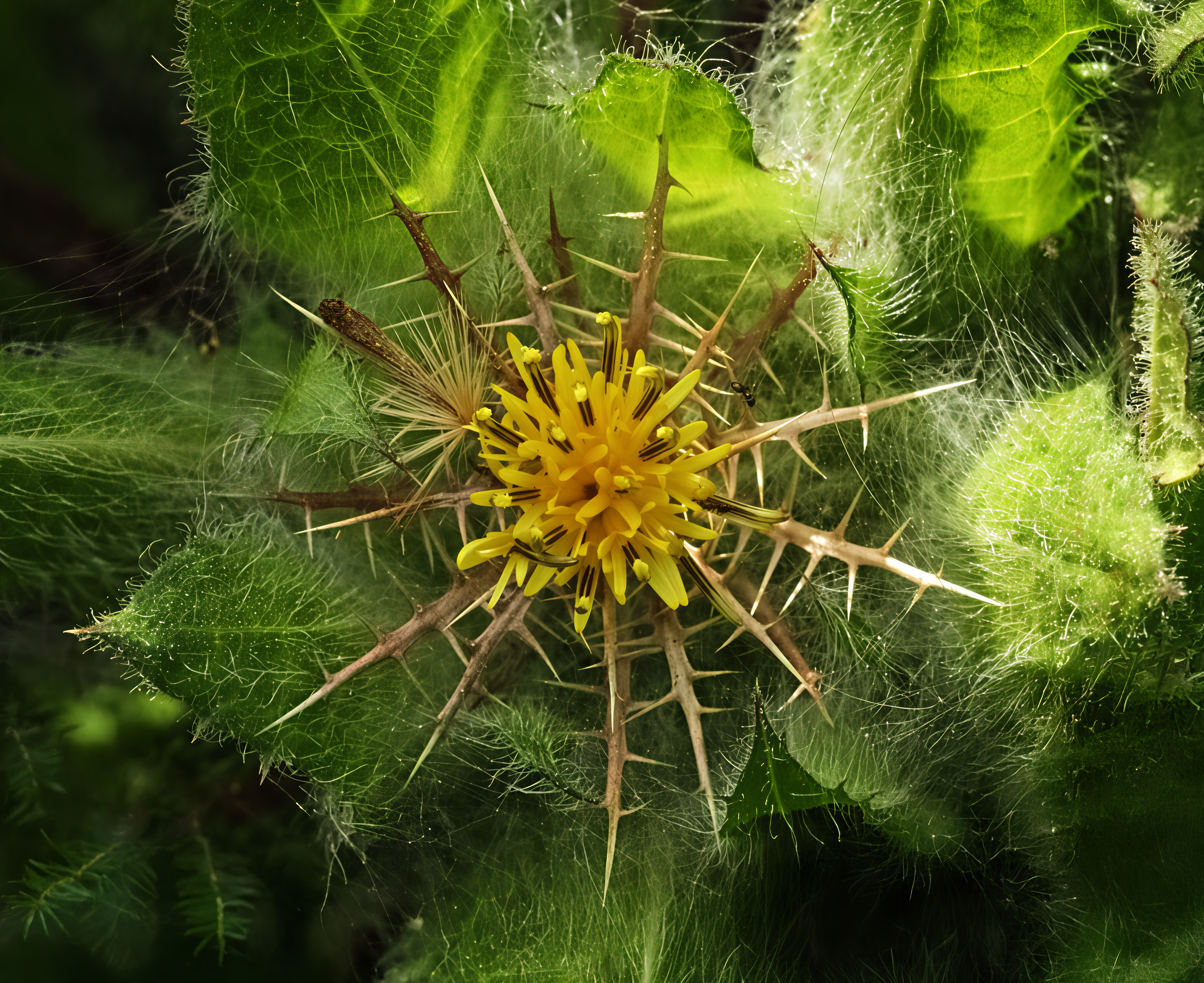

Scientific classification
- Kingdom: Plantae
- Clade: Tracheophytes
- Clade: Angiosperms
- Clade: Eudicots
- Clade: Asterids
- Order: Asterales
- Family: Asteraceae
- Tribe: Cardueae
- Subtribe: Centaureinae
- Genus: Centaurea
- Species: C. benedicta

Binomial name
- Centaurea benedicta (L.) L.

Synonyms
- Synonymy: Calcitrapa benedicta (L.) Sweet; Calcitrapa lanuginosa Lam., nom. superfl.; Carbeni benedicta (L.) Arcang.; Carbenia benedicta (L.) Adans.; Cardosanctus officinalis Bubani, nom. illeg.; Cnicus benedictus L.

= Centaurea benedicta =

Species of plant

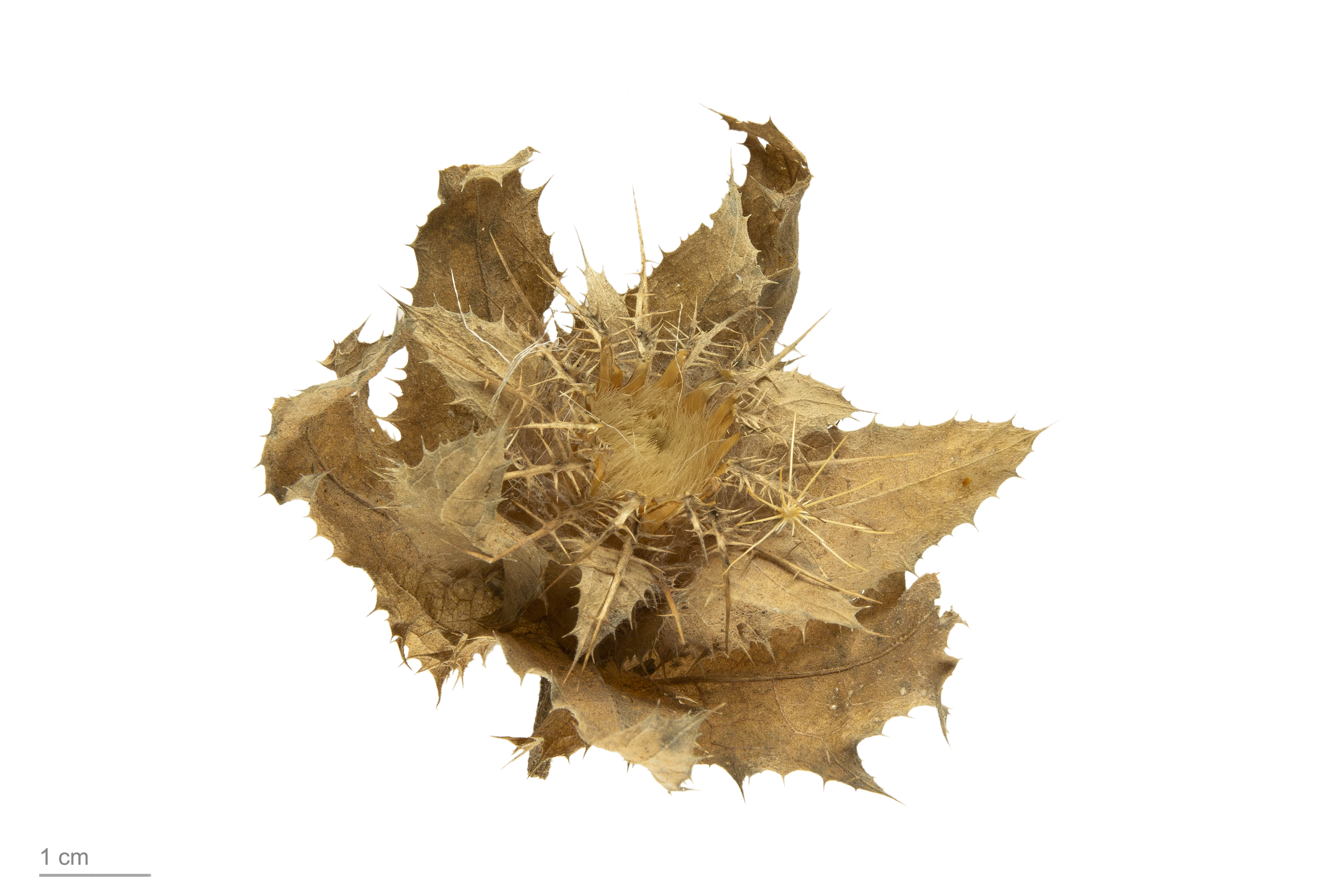
Centaurea benedicta MHNT

Centaurea benedicta, known by the common names St. Benedict's thistle, blessed thistle, holy thistle, spotted thistle or blessed knapweed, is an annual thistle-like plant in the family Asteraceae, native to Mediterranean Europe and western and Central Asia, ranging from Portugal and Spain to southeastern Europe, Ukraine and southern European Russia, Saudi Arabia, Xinjiang, and Pakistan. It is known in other parts of the world, including parts of North America, as an introduced species and often a noxious weed.

== Growth ==
Centaurea benedicta is an annual plant growing to 60 cm tall, with leathery, hairy leaves up to 30 cm long and 8 cm broad, with small spines on the margins. The flowers are yellow, produced in a dense flowerhead (capitulum) 3–4 cm diameter, surrounded by numerous spiny basal bracts. Blessed thistle blooms mid summer to early fall.

All parts of the plant have a light down covering. This plant has a sprawling habit instead of standing upright. It needs full sun to grow and good soil drainage, as it will die in waterlogged soil. Blessed thistle benefits from daily watering, producing lush leaves.

Seeds are too large to start in most seed trays, so it is recommended to sow outside after the danger of frost passes. Bury the seed 1/4 inch in the soil which should remain moist until germination that takes between two and three weeks. Leave at least 12 to 15 inches of space between plants.

== In literature ==
In Shakespeare's comedy Much Ado About Nothing, “Carduus Benedictus”, in tincture form, is recommended for a cold. The pointed allusion, by Margaret, is to Beatrice's tormentor-lover, Benedick.

== Folk medicine ==
Blessed thistle is used in folk remedies as a galactagogue with other herbs to increase breast milk supply, although there is no scientific evidence that such use is effective. Although the leaves are unpalatable with a bitter taste, blessed thistle is used as a flavoring in alcoholic beverages, and is considered a safe ingredient for food uses. As a member of the ragweed family, blessed thistle may cause allergic reactions in susceptible people, and use of large amounts may cause stomach cramps, nausea and vomiting.
