= Lists of plants =

This is an index of some of the lists of plants.

== Plant list articles ==
- List of electronic Floras
- List of herbaria
- List of florilegia and botanical codices
- Lists of cultivars
  - List of grape varieties
  - List of gooseberries
  - List of Capsicum cultivars
  - List of apple cultivars
  - List of tomato cultivars
  - List of banana cultivars
  - List of cucumber varieties
- List of garden plants
- List of plant hybrids
- List of largest plants
- List of trifoliate plants
- Succulent plants
- CAM plants
- Weeping tree
- List of largest seeds
- Lists of plant species
- List of plants by common name
- List of lyrate plants
- Lists of flowers
  - List of Asteraceae genera
  - List of Amaryllidoideae genera
  - List of Liliaceae genera
  - List of Orchidaceae genera
  - List of Phyllanthaceae genera
  - List of Picrodendraceae genera
  - List of largest inflorescences
- Lists of trees
  - List of tree genera
  - List of Clusiaceae genera
  - List of oldest trees
  - List of tallest trees
  - List of superlative trees
  - List of individual trees
  - List of national trees
- List of world records held by plants

=== By classification ===
- List of Anthurium species
- List of bamboo species
- List of basal eudicot families
- List of trees and shrubs by taxonomic family
- List of gymnosperm families
- List of nitrogen-fixing-clade families
- List of the largest genera of flowering plants

=== By place ===
- Lists of biota by country

==== Africa ====
- List of plants of Burkina Faso
- Lists of flowering plants of South Africa
- List of Ngorongoro Crater plants

==== Americas ====
===== North America =====
- List of endangered plants of North America
- Lists of flora of the United States
- List of Canadian plants by family
- List of Canadian plants by genus
- List of trees of Canada
- List of flora of the Lower Colorado River Valley
- List of plants endemic to Hells Canyon
- List of plants of the Sierra Nevada (U.S.)
- List of Sonoran Desert wildflowers
- List of endemic flora of Puerto Rico
- List of trees of the Caribbean
- List of California native plants
- List of plants endemic to the Appalachian Mountains

===== South America =====
- List of endangered flora of Brazil
- List of plants of the Amazon rainforest
- List of plants of Pantanal vegetation of Brazil
- List of plants of Caatinga vegetation of Brazil
- List of plants of Cerrado vegetation of Brazil

==== Asia ====
- List of endemic flora of Israel
- List of plants of Malaysia
- List of the vascular plants in the Red Data Book of Russia
- List of plants of Doi Suthep–Pui National Park
- List of endemic plants in the Nilgiri Biosphere Reserve
- List of threatened plants of the Philippines
- List of trees of Cambodia
- List of trees of Iran
- List of common trees and shrubs of Sri Lanka
- List of native plants of Flora Palaestina (A–B), (C–D), (E–O), (P–Z)

==== Europe ====
- Endangered plants of Europe
- List of vascular plants of the Karelian Isthmus
- List of plants from the mountains of Romania
- List of Balkan endemic plants
- Flora of Great Britain and Ireland
  - List of trees of Great Britain and Ireland
- List of indigenous trees and shrubs of Lithuania

==== Oceania ====
- List of threatened flora of Australia
- List of endemic plants in the Mariana Islands
- List of trees native to New Zealand

=== By time ===
- List of Early Devonian land plants

=== By topic ===
- Lists of extinct plants
- List of extinct in the wild plants
- List of critically endangered plants
- List of endangered plants
- List of near threatened plants
- List of data deficient plants
- List of plants in the Bible
- List of plants poisonous to equines
- List of poisonous plants
- List of carnivorous plants
- List of flower bulbs
- List of myco-heterotrophic genera
- List of C4 plants
- List of crop plants pollinated by bees
- List of plants with symbolism
- List of sequenced plant genomes
- List of wetland plants
- List of plants with dehiscent fruits

=== By common name ===
- List of plants by common name
- List of plant family names with etymologies
- List of plants known as arugula
- List of plants known as breadfruit
- List of plants known as bottlebrush
- List of plants known as buckthorn
- List of plants known as cedar
- List of plants known as chickweed
- List of plants known as compass plant
- List of plants known as cowslip
- List of plants known as figwort
- List of plants known as hairy sedge
- List of plants known as honeybush
- List of plants known as ivy
- List of plants known as laurel
- List of plants known as lily
- List of plants known as lotus
- List of plants known as lungwort
- List of plants known as milk thistle
- List of plants known as mugwort
- List of plants known as mulberry
- List of plants known as myrtle
- List of plants known as nettle
- List of plants known as oil palm
- List of plants known as orange
- List of plants known as rush
- List of plants known as sea lettuce
- List of plants known as sour cherry
- List of plants known as tamarind
- List of plants known as violet
- Woodbine
- List of wort plants
- List of Māori plant common names
  - List of plants known as tōtara
- List of crops known as peas

=== By use ===
- Lists of useful plants
- Herb
  - Plants used as herbs or spices
  - List of plants used in herbalism
  - List of culinary herbs and spices
  - List of herbs with known adverse effects
- Medicinal plants
  - List of medicinal plants of the American West
- List of textile fibres
- List of woods
- List of Indian timber trees
- List of beneficial weeds
- List of plants used for smoking
- List of domesticated plants
- List of leaf vegetables
- List of culinary fruits
- List of citrus fruits
- List of root vegetables
- List of culinary nuts
- List of edible flowers
- List of edible seeds
- List of forageable plants
- List of national fruits
- Domesticated plants of Mesoamerica
- List of food plants native to the Americas
- List of culinary herbs and spices
- List of marine aquarium plant species
- List of species used in bonsai
- Christmas plants
- Psychoactive plant
  - List of psychoactive plants
  - List of Acacia species known to contain psychoactive alkaloids
  - Hallucinogenic plants in Chinese herbals

=== Lists of algae ===
By taxonomic classification

- List of brown algal genera
- List of Chlorophyceae genera
- List of Mamiellophyceae genera
- List of Trebouxiophyceae genera
- List of Ulvophyceae genera

By geographic location

- List of algae of the Houtman Abrolhos

== See also ==
- List of animals
- What Plant is This
