= List of plants from the mountains of Romania =

A list of plants native to the mountain ranges of Romania.

Many Romanian mountain ranges, mountains, and peaks are part of the Southern Carpathians System, and the Carpathian montane forests ecoregion.

== List of flowering plants of the Romanian mountain ranges ==
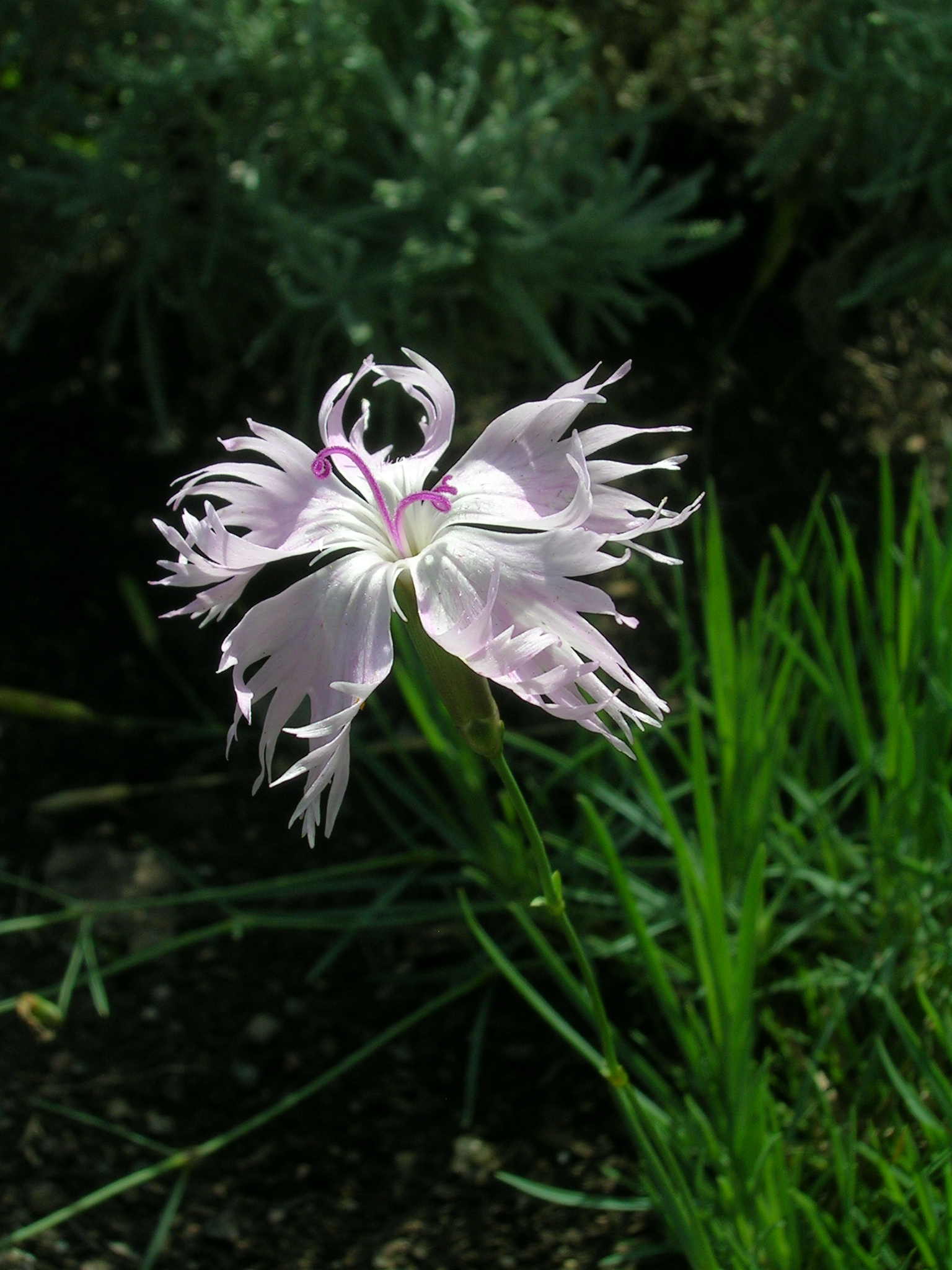
Dianthus spiculifolius

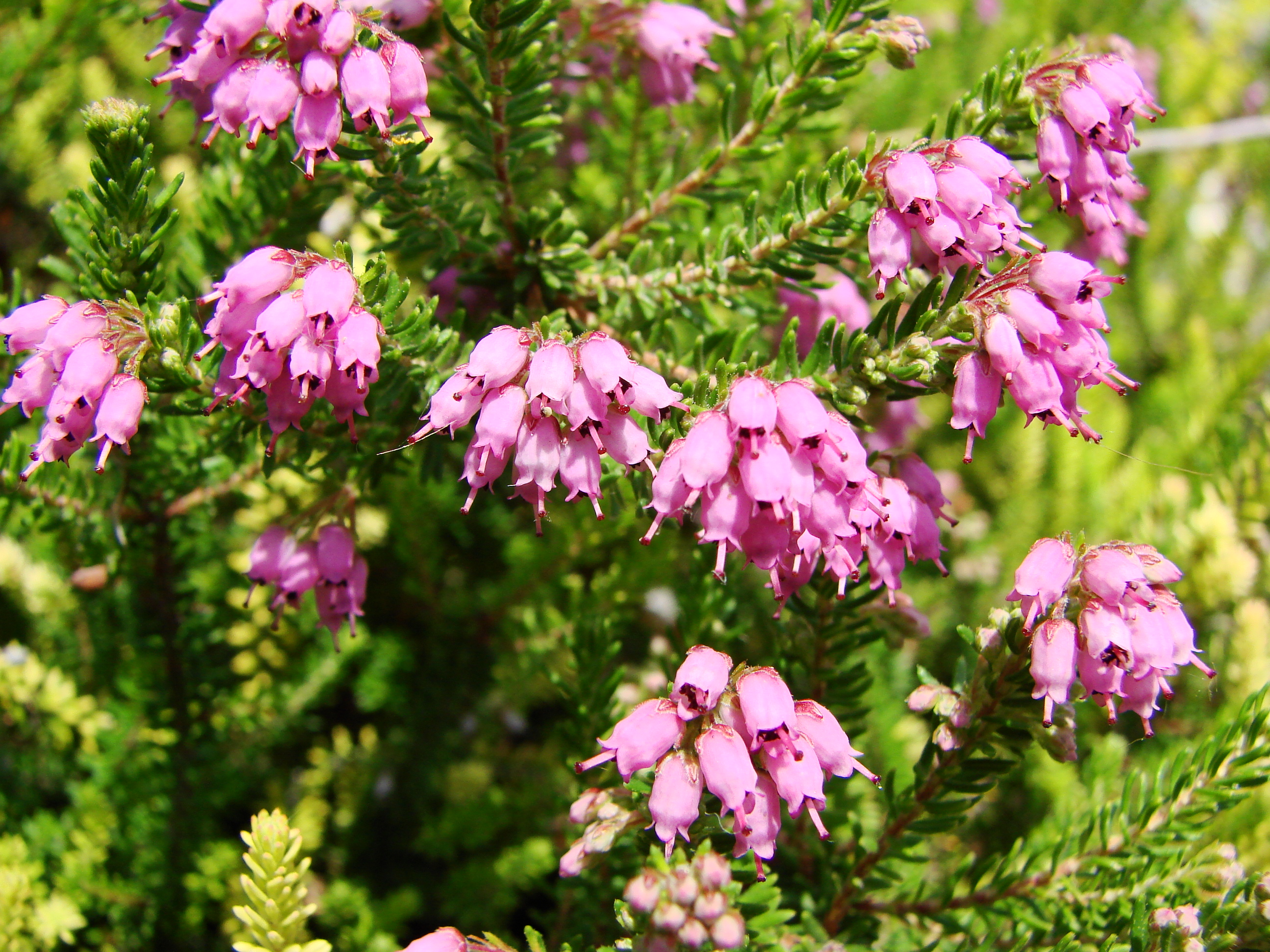
Bruckenthalia spiculifolia

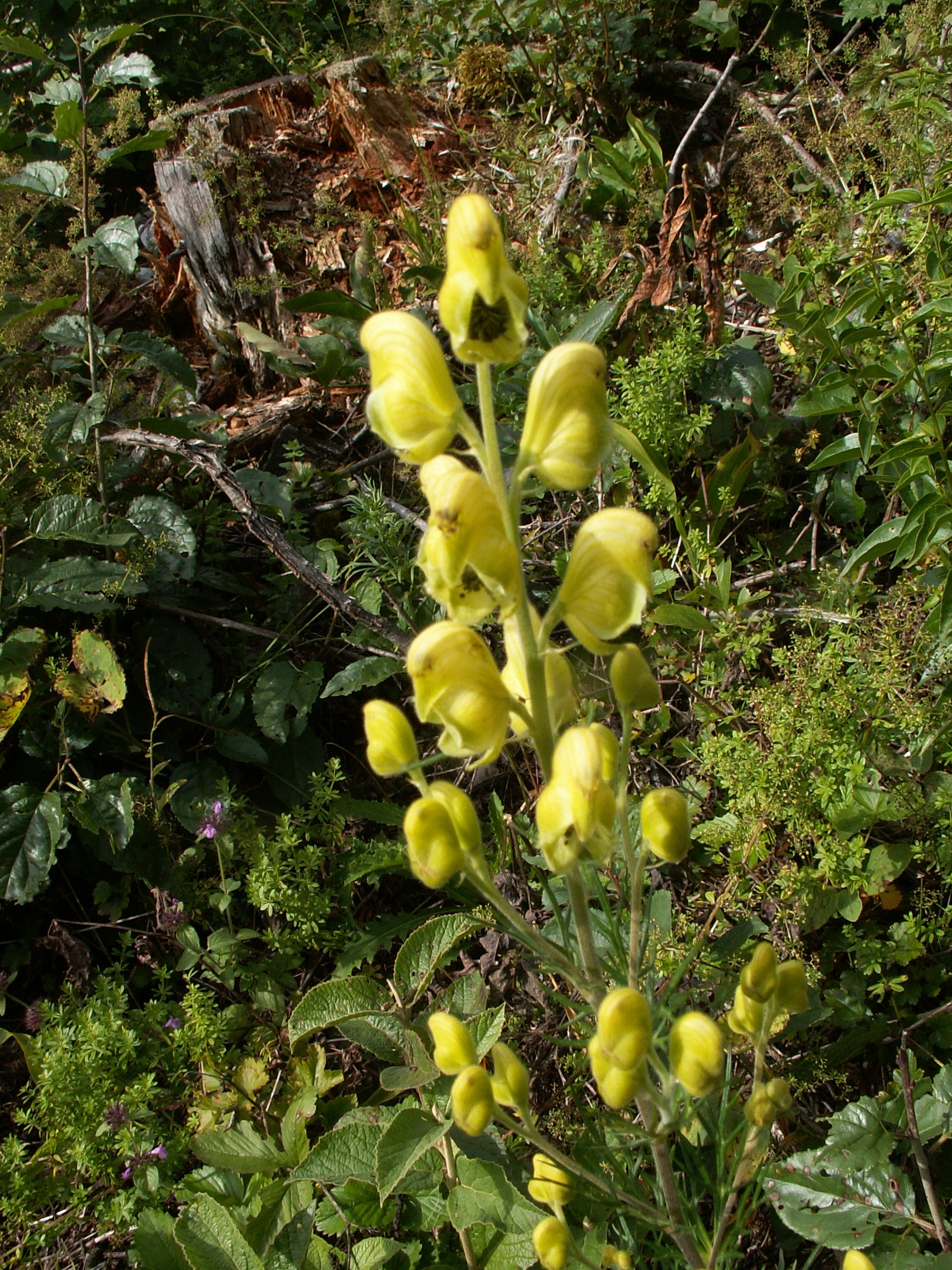
Aconitum anthora

- Aconitum anthora
- Androsace lactea
- Androsace villosa
- Alyssum repens
- Artemisia baumgarteni
- Anthemis carpatica
- Armeria alpina
- Aster alpinus
- Biscutella laevigata
- Bruckenthalia spiculifolia (syn. Erica spiculifolia)
- Centaurea pinnatifida
- Campanula napuligera
- Campanula alpina
- Campanula cochleariifolia
- Cerastium arvense
- Cerastium lanatum
- Cortusa matthioli
- Carlina acaulis
- Calamintha baumgarteni
- Dianthus spiculifolius
- Dianthus callizonus
- Dianthus gelidus
- Dianthus nardiformis
- Dianthus tenuifolius
- Doronicum carpaticum
- Draba compacta
- Dryas octopetala
- Erigeron nanus
- Eritrichium nanum
- Gentiana kochiana
- Geum reptans
- Gentiana bulgarica
- Gentiana lutea
- Gentiana orbicularis
- Gentiana frigida
- Gypsophila petraea
- Geum montanum
- Gentiana nivalis
- Hedysarum obscurum
- Helianthemum tomentosum
- Hesperis alpina
- Hieracium aurantiacum
- Hieracium villosum
- Hypochaeris uniflora
- Knautia longifolia
- Leontopodium alpinum
- Leontodon pseudotaraxaci
- Libanotis humilis
- Linaria alpina
- Linum extraaxillare
- Lloydia serotina
- Minuartia recurva
- Minuartia sedoides
- Nigritella rubra
- Onobrychis transsilvanica
- Oxytropis campestris
- Oxytropis sericea
- Papaver pyrenaicum
- Pedicularis verticillata
- Pleurogyne carinthiaca
- Potentilla inclinata
- Rhododendron kotschyi
- Scorzonera rosea
- Senecio capitatus
- Senecio carpathicus
- Saxifraga aiatratum
- Silene acaulis
- Saxifraga aizoides
- Saxifraga demissa
- Saxifraga opposiiifolia
- Saxifraga moschata
- Saxifraga luteouiridis
- Trollius europaeus
- Viola alpina
- Viola biflora

== See also ==
- Flora of Romania
- Montane flora
- Mountains of Romania
- Mountain ranges of Romania
- Media related to Flora of Romania at Wikimedia Commons
