= List of Liliaceae genera =

The List of Liliaceae genera has been much reduced by modern molecular phylogenetic based taxonomy. The current taxonomy of Liliaceae treats the family Liliaceae as having three subfamilies, with the Liliodeae being further subdivided into two tribes, the Medeoleae and Lilieae. The family Liliaceae consists of fifteen genera and approximately 600 species in all.

== List of genera by subfamilial divisions ==
List of genera of family Liliaceae, arranged by Subfamilies and Tribes according to the Angiosperm Phylogeny Website and Angiosperm Phylogeny Group
Subfamily	Tribe	Genus	Image
Lilioideae Eaton	Medeoleae Benth. (synonyms: Medeolaceae Takht., Medeoloideae Benth.)	Clintonia Raf. - bead lilies	Clintonia borealis
Lilioideae Eaton	Medeoleae Benth. (synonyms: Medeolaceae Takht., Medeoloideae Benth.)	Medeola Gronov. ex L. - Indian cucumber-root	Medeola virginiana
Lilioideae Eaton	Lilieae s.l. Ritgen (synonyms: Erythroniaceae Martinov, Fritillariaceae Salisb., Liriaceae Borkh., Tulipaceae Borkh.) (Some classifications place Tulipa and Erythronium into a separate tribe: Tulipeae with the remaining genera in Lilieae s.s.)|	Amana Honda	Amana edulis
Lilioideae Eaton	Lilieae s.l. Ritgen (synonyms: Erythroniaceae Martinov, Fritillariaceae Salisb., Liriaceae Borkh., Tulipaceae Borkh.) (Some classifications place Tulipa and Erythronium into a separate tribe: Tulipeae with the remaining genera in Lilieae s.s.)|	Cardiocrinum (Endl.) Lindl. - giant lilies	Cardiocrinum giganteum
Lilioideae Eaton	Lilieae s.l. Ritgen (synonyms: Erythroniaceae Martinov, Fritillariaceae Salisb., Liriaceae Borkh., Tulipaceae Borkh.) (Some classifications place Tulipa and Erythronium into a separate tribe: Tulipeae with the remaining genera in Lilieae s.s.)|	Fritillaria Tourn. ex L. – fritillary or mission bells	Fritillaria crassifolia
Lilioideae Eaton	Lilieae s.l. Ritgen (synonyms: Erythroniaceae Martinov, Fritillariaceae Salisb., Liriaceae Borkh., Tulipaceae Borkh.) (Some classifications place Tulipa and Erythronium into a separate tribe: Tulipeae with the remaining genera in Lilieae s.s.)|	Gagea Salisb. (including Lloydia Salisb. ex Rchb.) – yellow star-of-Bethlehem	Gagea lutea
Lilioideae Eaton	Lilieae s.l. Ritgen (synonyms: Erythroniaceae Martinov, Fritillariaceae Salisb., Liriaceae Borkh., Tulipaceae Borkh.) (Some classifications place Tulipa and Erythronium into a separate tribe: Tulipeae with the remaining genera in Lilieae s.s.)|	Lilium Tourn. ex L. (including Nomocharis Franch.) – lily	Lilium candidum
Lilioideae Eaton	Lilieae s.l. Ritgen (synonyms: Erythroniaceae Martinov, Fritillariaceae Salisb., Liriaceae Borkh., Tulipaceae Borkh.) (Some classifications place Tulipa and Erythronium into a separate tribe: Tulipeae with the remaining genera in Lilieae s.s.)|	Notholirion Wall. ex Boiss.	Notholirion macrophyllum
Lilioideae Eaton	Lilieae s.l. Ritgen (synonyms: Erythroniaceae Martinov, Fritillariaceae Salisb., Liriaceae Borkh., Tulipaceae Borkh.) (Some classifications place Tulipa and Erythronium into a separate tribe: Tulipeae with the remaining genera in Lilieae s.s.)|	Tulipa L. – tulip	Tulipa aucheriana
Lilioideae Eaton	Lilieae s.l. Ritgen (synonyms: Erythroniaceae Martinov, Fritillariaceae Salisb., Liriaceae Borkh., Tulipaceae Borkh.) (Some classifications place Tulipa and Erythronium into a separate tribe: Tulipeae with the remaining genera in Lilieae s.s.)|	Erythronium L. – trout lily	Erythronium sibiricum
Calochortoideae Dumort. (synonyms: Calochortaceae Dumort., Compsoaceae Horan., nom. illeg., Tricyrtidaceae Takht., nom. cons.)		Calochortus Pursh - mariposa, globe lilies	Calochortus catalinae
Calochortoideae Dumort. (synonyms: Calochortaceae Dumort., Compsoaceae Horan., nom. illeg., Tricyrtidaceae Takht., nom. cons.)		Tricyrtis Wall. – toad lily	Tricyrtis hirta
Streptopoideae (synonym: Scoliopaceae Takht.)		Prosartes D.Don – drops of gold	Prosartes hookeri
Streptopoideae (synonym: Scoliopaceae Takht.)		Scoliopus Torr. – Fetid Adder's Tongue	Scoliopus bigelovii
Streptopoideae (synonym: Scoliopaceae Takht.)		Streptopus Michx. – twistedstalk	Streptopus lanceolatus
The situation with respect to Calochortoideae remains uncertain. Originally Calochortus and Tricyrtis were considered to be sister clades and placed together in subfamily Calochortoideae. Further study has not confirmed this and it has been proposed that Tricyrtis be placed in a separate subfamily.

== Bibliography ==
- Stevens, P.F. (2015) [1st. Pub. 2001], Angiosperm Phylogeny Website, Missouri Botanical Garden
- Peruzzi, L.; Leitch, I.J.; Caparelli, K.F. (2009). "Chromosome diversity and evolution in Liliaceae". Annals of Botany. 103 (3): 459–475. doi:10.1093/aob/mcn230. PMC 2707325. PMID 19033282.
- Kim, Jung Sung; Hong, Jeong-Ki; Chase, Mark W.; Fay, Michael F.; Kim, Joo-Hwan (May 2013). "Familial relationships of the monocot order Liliales based on a molecular phylogenetic analysis using four plastid loci: matK, rbcL, atpB and atpF-H". Botanical Journal of the Linnean Society. 172 (1): 5–21. doi:10.1111/boj.12039.
