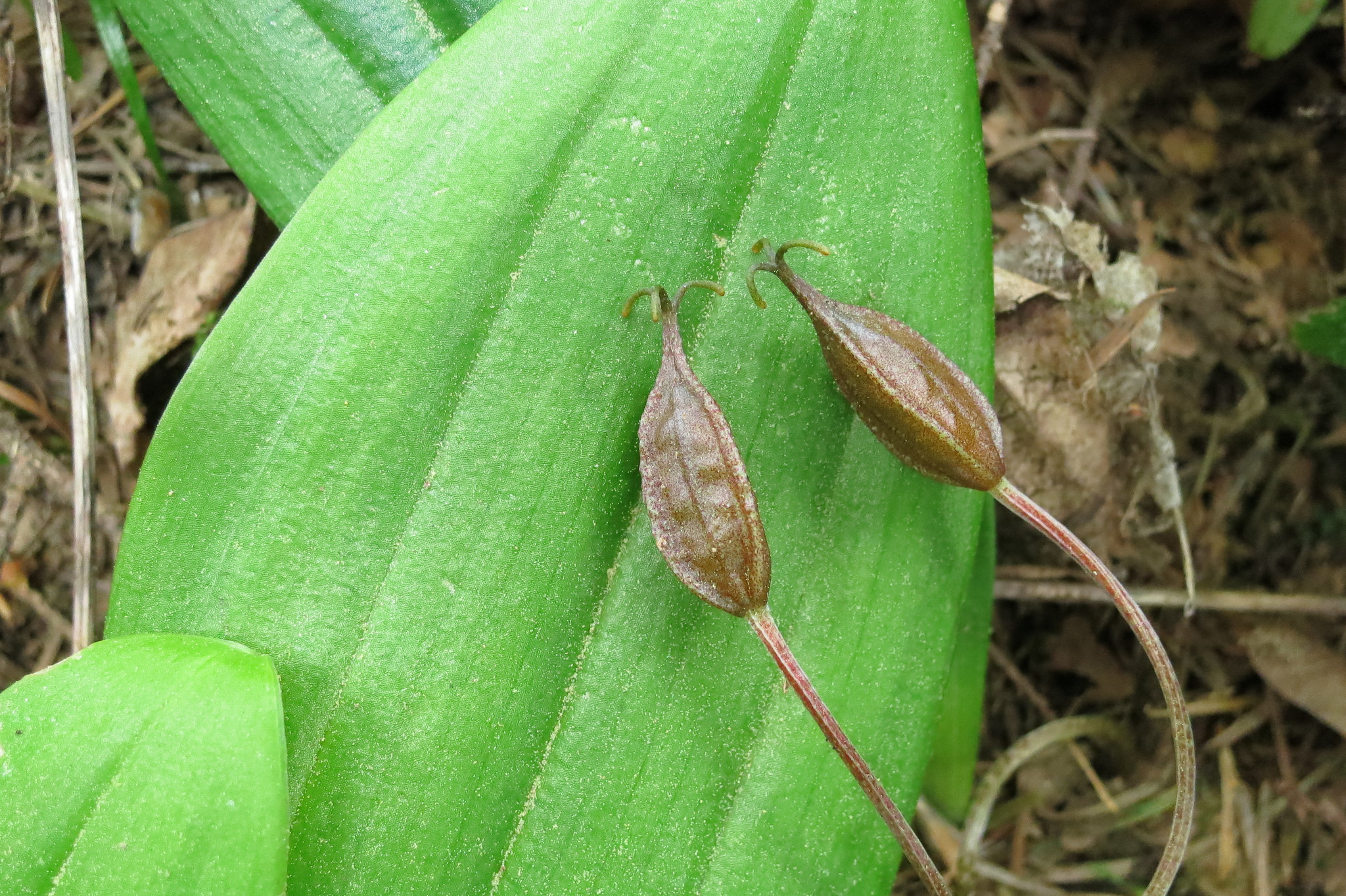

Scientific classification
- Kingdom: Plantae
- Clade: Tracheophytes
- Clade: Angiosperms
- Clade: Monocots
- Order: Liliales
- Family: Liliaceae
- Genus: Scoliopus
- Species: S. hallii

Binomial name
- Scoliopus hallii S.Wats.

= Scoliopus hallii =

Oregon fetid adderstongue

Species of flowering plant

Scoliopus hallii, the Oregon fetid adderstongue, is a plant species endemic to western Oregon. It is closely related to the California fetid adderstongue, Scoliopus bigelovii, but has yellow flowers with thin purple stripes rather than the purple flowers with yellow stripes as in S. bigelovii
