= List of domesticated fungi and microorganisms =

Many fungi and microorganisms have been domesticated by humans for use in food production, medicine, and research. The following is a list of domesticated fungi and microorganisms:

== Food ==
Organism	Use
Agaricus bisporus	Eaten; "Button mushroom" or "portabello mushroom".
Aspergillus oryzae	Fermentation of traditional Japanese foods and beverages.
bacteria	(for cheese, yogurt, kephir, buttermilk, sour cream, kombucha tea, spirulina)
Lactic acid bacteria	Fermentation of dairy, plants, and meats.
Lactobacillus delbrueckii	Production of yogurt (Bulgaria).
Lactococcus casei	Production of cheese (with a fruity flavor).
Lactococcus helveticus	Production of cheese, including swiss cheese.
Lactococcus lactis	Production of cheese.
Leuconostoc mesenteroides	Fermentation of sauerkraut.
Moulds	(for making cheese, tempeh, Quorn, Pu-erh and some sausages)
Edible mushrooms	Food
Oenococcus oeni	Involved in wine fermentation.
Saccharomyces cerevisiae	Fermentation of beer and wine; leavening of bread.
Streptococcus thermophilus	Production of yogurt (France, United Kingdom).
Yeasts	Baking, winemaking, brewing
Ustilago maydis	Huitlacoche
Arthrospira spp.	Dietary supplement

== Research and medicine ==
Organism	Use
viruses	(for vaccines and research)
bacteria	(for making drugs)
molds	(for making antibiotics)

== Industry ==
Organism	Use
bacteria	Chemical production

== See also ==
- List of domesticated plants
- List of domesticated animals
- Agriculture
