= List of plants known as tamarind =

Tamarind can refer to Tamarindus indica, and to several other tropical trees, including:

- Diploglottis australis, native tamarind, a rainforest tree of Eastern Australia
- Garcinia gummi-gutta, Malabar tamarind, native to Indonesia

== See also ==
- Velvet tamarind
