= Whipple Expedition =

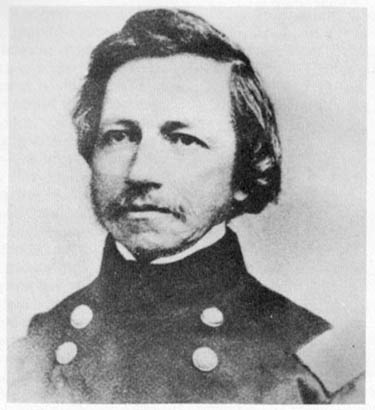
Amiel Weeks Whipple

The Whipple Expedition (1853–1854) was led by Lieutenant Amiel Weeks Whipple and tasked with conducting a survey from Fort Smith, Arkansas, to Los Angeles, California, along the 35th parallel north. The expedition lasted for nine months and traveled 1,800 miles (2,900 km).

The expedition was one of several surveys approved in 1853-4, when funding was added to the War Department budget. This allowed Secretary of War Jefferson Davis to send out surveying expeditions to explore potential transcontinental railroad routes across the United States.

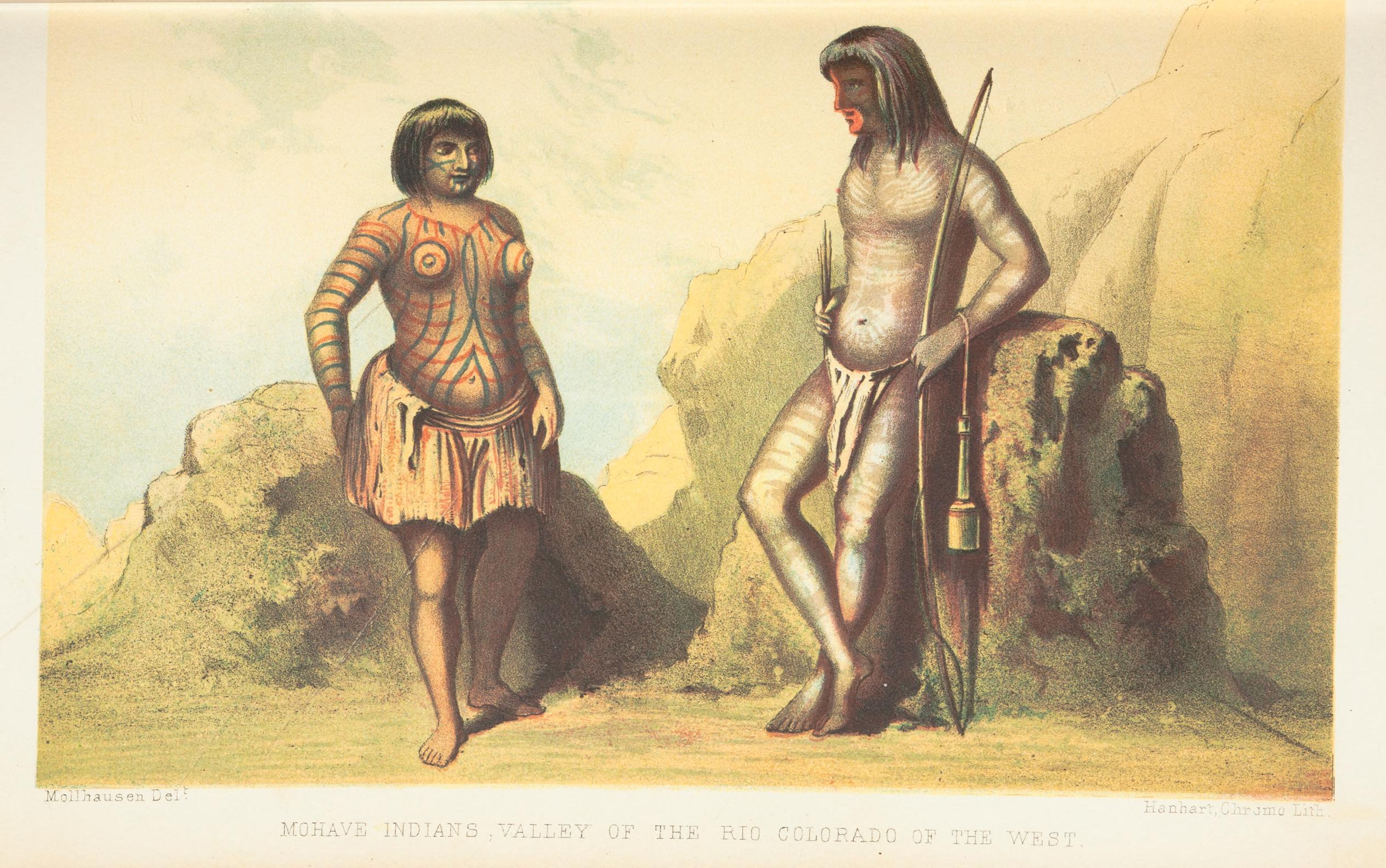
Drawing from the expedition

Reports from these expeditions were published between 1855 and 1861 by the federal government in a twelve-volume report titled "Reports of explorations and surveys, to ascertain the most practicable and economical route for a railroad from the Mississippi River to the Pacific Ocean". These reports were also known as the Pacific Railroad Surveys. Volumes III and IV contain the reports from Whipple's expedition. Volume 5 contains the first-known description of many plant species (of which type specimens were also made), including Scoliopus bigelovii, Clarkia williamsonii, Castilleja candens, and several species of Eriogonum (buckwheat).

== Bibliography ==
- Conrad, David E. (1969). "The Whipple Expedition in Arizona 1853-1854". Arizona and the West. 11 (2): 147–78.
