= List of domesticated plants =

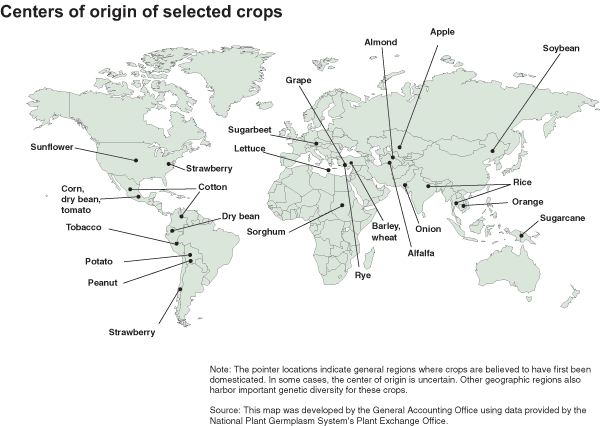
This map shows the sites of domestication for a number of crop plants. Places, where crops were initially domesticated, are called centers of origin.

This is a list of plants that have been domesticated by humans. The list includes individual plant species identified by their common names as well as larger formal and informal botanical categories which include at least some domesticated individuals. Plants in this list are grouped by the original or primary purpose for which they were domesticated, and subsequently by botanical or culinary categories. Plants with more than one significant human use may be listed in multiple categories.

Plants are considered domesticated when their life cycle, behavior, or appearance has been significantly altered as a result of being under artificial selection by humans for multiple generations (see the main article on domestication for more information). Thousands of distinct plant species have been domesticated throughout human history. Not all modern domesticated plant varieties can be found growing in the wild; many are actually hybrids of two or more naturally occurring species and therefore have no wild counterpart.

== Food and cooking ==
=== Fruit trees ===
==== Pomes ====
- Apple (Malus domestica)
- Asian pear
- Loquat (Japanese medlar)
- Common medlar
- Pear
- Quince

==== Citrus fruits ====
- Citron
- Grapefruit
- Lemon
- Lime
- Orange
- Pomelo

==== Nut trees ====
- Almond
- Cashew
- Chestnut
- Hazelnut
- Macadamia
- Pecan (Carya illinoinensis)
- Pistachio
- Walnut

==== Other ====
Numerous other trees have been domesticated for their fruits. There are more than 100 known domesticated plant species native to the Amazon alone.

- Açaí palm (Euterpe oleracea)
- American-oil palm
- Apricot
- Babacu
- Banana (Musa spp.)
- Breadfruit
- Calabash
- Cherry
- Coconut palm
- Durian (Durio spp.)
- Ensete
- Fig
- Ice-cream bean
- Jackfruit
- Mango
- Panama-hat palm
- Papaya (Carica papaya)
- Passionfruit
- Peach and Nectarine
- Peach palm (Bactris gasipaes)
- Plum
- Sapodilla
- Tucuma

=== Cereals ===
- Barley
- Finger millet
- Fonio
- Foxtail millet
- Little barley (Hordeum pusillum, central US pre-Columbian)
- Maize (called corn in the U.S.)
- Maygrass (Phalaris caroliniana, central US pre-Columbian)
- Pearl millet
- Proso millet
- Oats
- Rice
- Rye
- Sorghum
- Spelt
- Teff (also tef)
- Triticale (Secalotriticum spp.) – a hybrid between wheat and rye
- Wheat
  - Bread wheat (Triticum aestivum)
  - Pasta or Durum wheat (Triticum durum)
  - Einkorn wheat (Triticum monococcum)

==== Pseudocereals ====
- Amaranth
- Buckwheat
- Job's tears
- Knotweed bristlegrass (erect knotweed, New World)
- Pitseed goosefoot (Chenopodium berlandieri, central US pre-Columbian)
- Quinoa
- Sunflower (Helianthus annuus)
- Marshelder (sumpweed, Iva annua, central US pre-Columbian)
- Sesame

=== Legumes ===
- Beans – eaten dry as pulses or fresh as vegetables
  - Azuki bean (Vigna angularis)
  - Black-eyed pea (Vigna unguiculata)
  - Chickpea (Cicer arietinum)
  - Common bean (Phaseolus spp., including pinto bean, kidney bean, runner bean, Lima bean, and others)
  - Lentil (Lens culinaris)
  - Velvet bean (Mucuna pruriens)
  - Moth bean -(Vigna aconitifolia)
  - Mung bean (Vigna radiata)
  - Pea (Pisum sativum)
  - Peanut (Arachis hypogaea) – botanically a legume, but often referred to as a culinary nut
  - Soybean (Glycine max)
- Jicama (Pachyrhizus erosus) – the most valuable edible part of the plant is the tuberous root rather than the bean

=== Sweet small-plant fruits ===
==== Aggregated drupelet "berries" ====
- Raspberry
- Blackberry

==== True berries ====
- Blueberry
- Cranberry
- Huckleberry

==== Other ====
- Currant
- Grape
- Melon (several species)
- Pineapple
- Strawberry
- Avocado

=== Vegetables ===
Selective breeding enlarged desired traits of the wild mustard plant (Brassica oleracea) over hundreds of years, resulting in dozens of today's agricultural crops. Cabbage, kale, broccoli, and cauliflower were all products of this selective breeding, making them all the same plant.

==== Non-sweet small-plant fruits ====
- Eggplant (aubergine)
- Okra
- Peppers
- Squash (e.g., Cucurbita pepo, multiple varieties)
  - Winter squash
    - Pumpkin
  - Summer squash
    - Zucchini
  - Gourds
- Tomato

==== Root vegetables ====
- Non-starchy
  - Beet
  - Carrot
  - Parsnip
  - Radish
  - Turnip
- Starchy
  - Cassava (manioc, yuca) (requires special processing to be edible)
  - Potato
  - Sweet potato
  - Taro (requires special processing to be edible)
  - Yam
  - Ube

=== Herbs and spices ===
- Allspice
- Basil
- Cinnamon
- Coriander (also called cilantro)
- Cumin (Cuminum cyminum)
- Jasmine (Jasminum spp.)
- Lemongrass (Cymbopogon spp.)
- Nutmeg (Myristica fragrans)
- Oregano (Origanum vulgare)
- Parsley (Petroselinum crispum)
- Peppermint
- Rosemary (Salvia rosmarinus)
- Saffron (Crocus sativus)
- Spearmint
- Thyme (Thymus vulgaris)
- Wintergreen

=== Oil-producing plants ===
- Olive (also eaten directly in many parts of the world)

Legumes grown principally for oil production:

- Peanut (also eaten directly in many parts of the world)
- Soybean (also a major livestock feed and export crop, and sometimes eaten directly as a snack food)

== Commodities ==
Plants grown principally as animal fodder or for soil enrichment:

- Alfalfa
- Clover
- Many grasses are grown for hay and silage

Oil-producing plants (for fuel or lubrication):

- Canola (rapeseed)
- Olive

Utility plants:

- Bottle gourd (used for containers)

Psychoactive plants (for drugs or medicines):

- Belladonna
- Cannabis (Cannabis spp.)
- Chocolate (Theobroma cacao)
- Coffee (Coffea arabica)
- Hops (Humulus lupulus)
- Cola
- Opium poppy (Papaver somniferum)
- Quinine
- Tea (Camellia sinensis)
- Tobacco

Fiber plants (for textiles):

- Cannabis (hemp)
- Cotton
- Flax
- Henequen (sisal, henequin, etc.)
- Jute
- Kenaf
- Manila hemp
- Ramie

== Medicinal plants ==
- Aloe vera
- Cannabis
- Chamomile
- Coca
- Daisy
- Ginkgo
- Ginseng
- Hoodia
- Jasmine
- Lavender
- Lemon balm
- Lotus
- Marigold
- Milk thistle
- Moringa
- Opium Poppy
- Peppermint
- Rosemary
- Sage
- San pedro cactus
- Tea tree

== Ornamental plants ==
- Houseplants
- Landscaping (see List of garden plants)

== See also ==
- Botany
- Agriculture
- Crop wild relative
- Wild type
- Genomics of domestication
- Horticulture
- List of domesticated animals
- List of domesticated fungi and microorganisms
- List of useful plants
- List of poisonous plants
