= List of plants known as orange =

Orange identifies various species of trees, some with edible fruit and some not. Citrus sinensis includes many of the cultivated oranges used for their fruit, the common supermarket orange. Other species called oranges include:

== Family Rutaceae ==
- Aegle marmelos, Japanese bitter orange
- Some of the Citrus species, including:
  - Citrus × sinensis, sweet oranges, Valencia oranges, Navel oranges, and blood oranges
  - Citrus ampullacea, flask-shaped orange
  - Citrus aurantium, bitter orange, Seville orange, Indian lemon
  - Citrus bergamia, bergamot orange
  - Citrus bigaradia, bigarade orange
  - Citrus clementina, clementine orange
  - Citrus indica, Indian wild orange
  - Citrus leiocarpa, koji orange, smooth-fruited orange
  - Citrus medioglobosa, naruto orange
  - Citrus micrantha, small-flowered bitter orange
  - Citrus myrtifolia, myrtle-leafed orange
  - Citrus natsudaidai, Japanese summer orange
  - Citrus nobilis, mandarin orange
  - Citrus pyriformis, pear-shaped orange
  - Citrus reticulata, mandarin orange
  - Citrus suavissima, pleasant orange
  - Citrus succosa, sappy orange
  - Citrus suhuiensis, suhui orange
- Hortia species
- Poncirus trifoliata, Chinese bitter orange

== Family Capparaceae ==
Several species of Capparis, wild orange, native to Australia, including:

- Capparis mitchellii

== Family Moraceae ==
- Maclura pomifera, Osage orange

== Family Loganiaceae ==
- Several species of Strychnos native to Africa, known as wild orange or monkey orange, including:
  - Strychnos spinosa, monkey orange
