= Milkweed (disambiguation) =

Milkweed, Asclepias, is a genus of herbaceous, perennial, flowering plants named for their milky latex sap.

Milkweed may also refer to:

== Plants ==
- Calotropis, a genus from eastern and southern Asia, and northern Africa
- Euphorbia heterophylla, native to the Americas
- Euphorbia peplus, native to most of Europe, northern Africa, and western Asia

== Other uses ==
- Milkweed (novel), a children's novel by Jerry Spinelli
- Milkweed Editions, an independent publishing company based in Minneapolis, Minnesota
- Monarch butterfly (Danaus plexippus), also known as the milkweed

== See also ==
- List of plants known as milk thistle
