= Hortia superba =

Conservation status
- Vulnerable (IUCN 3.1)

Scientific classification
- Kingdom: Plantae
- Clade: Tracheophytes
- Clade: Angiosperms
- Clade: Eudicots
- Clade: Rosids
- Order: Sapindales
- Family: Rutaceae
- Genus: Hortia
- Species: H. superba

Binomial name
- Hortia superba Ducke

Species of plant

Hortia superba is a mid-story rainforest tree in the Citrus, or Rue, family (Rutaceae). It is native to the Amazon Basin, where it grows on dry to seasonally inundated soils.

== Description ==
The tree grows to between 5–25 metres (16–82 ft) in height by about 25 centimetres (9.8 in) thick. It is unbranched or rarely branched; the branches being vertical or nearly vertical (reiterations), the trunk and each reiteration topped by a cluster of large leaves typically 51–104 cm (20–41 in) long, occasionally to 120 centimetres (47 in) long, by 11.5–22 centimetres (4.5–8.7 in) wide. The inflorescence is a terminal thyrse up to 40–50 centimetres (16–20 in) diameter. The fruit is an obovoid berry up to 7–7.5 centimetres (2.8–3.0 in) long and 5.5–6 centimetres (2.2–2.4 in) diameter containing several seeds.
