= List of trees of Iran =

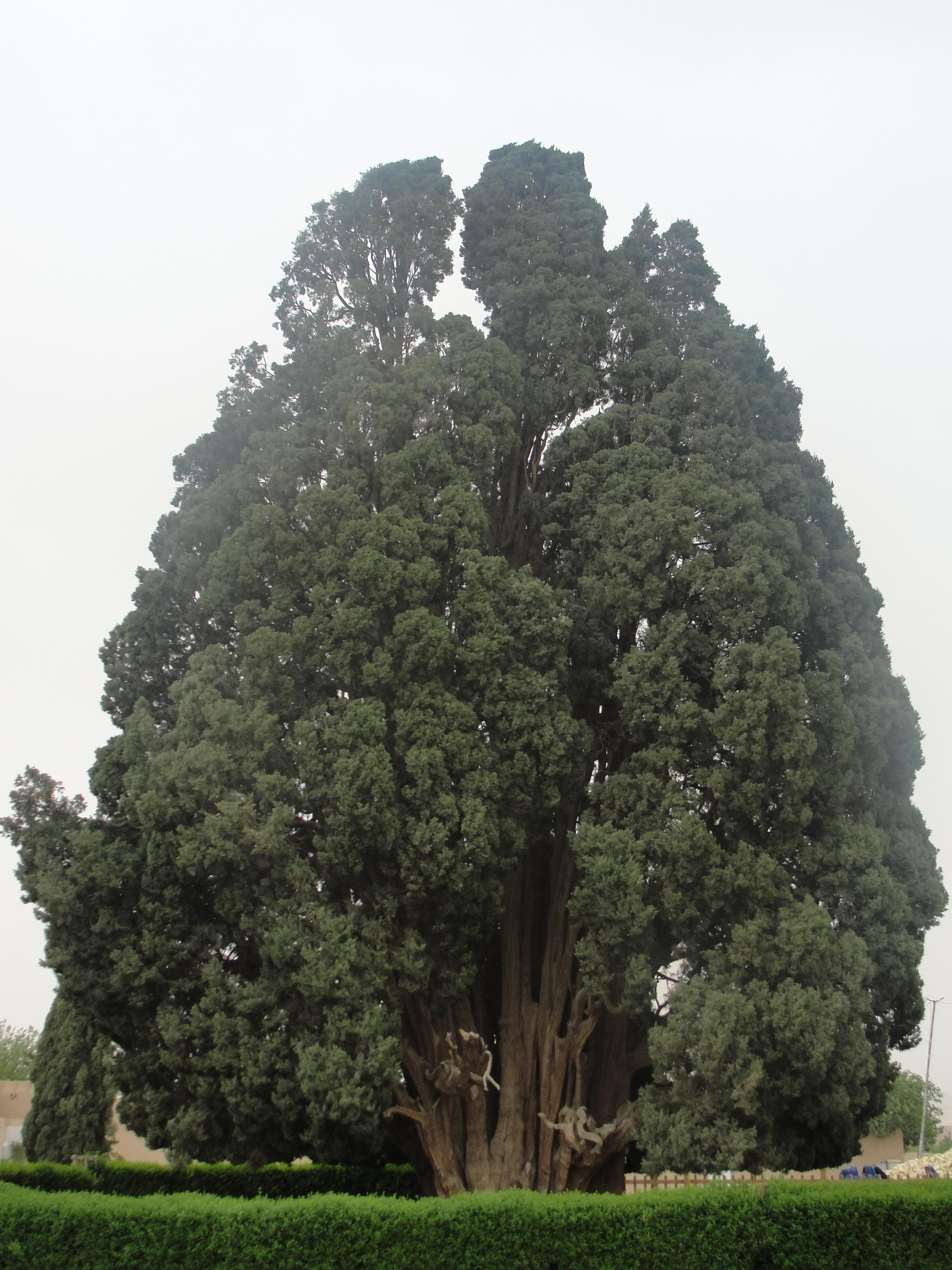
4000 years old Cypress of Abarqu is the oldest tree in Iran and the second oldest tree in the world.

Iran has a very varied climate and a large variety of plants. More than 13 percent of the country is covered by forests. The list below is a just a start and is yet to be completed:

- Anacardiaceae
  - Pistacia vera
- Aquifoliaceae
  - Ilex aquifolium
- Arecaceae
  - Phoenix dactylifera
- Betulaceae
  - Betula medwediewii
  - Betula pendula
  - Alnus glutinosa
  - Alnus incana
  - Alnus subcordata
  - Carpinus betulus
  - Carpinus orientalis
  - Corylus colurna
  - Ostrya carpinifolia
- Buxaceae
  - Buxus hyrcana
  - Buxus sempervirens
- Celtidaceae
  - Celtis caucasica
  - Celtis australis
- Cupressaceae
  - Cupressus sempervirens
  - Juniperus communis
  - Juniperus excelsa
  - Juniperus foetidissima
  - Juniperus excelsa
  - Juniperus oxycedrus
  - Juniperus sabina
  - Platycladus orientalis (introduced by man)
- Ebenaceae
  - Diospyros lotus
- Elaeagnaceae
  - Elaeagnus angustifolia
- Fabaceae
  - Albizia julibrissin
  - Cercis siliquastrum
  - Gleditsia caspica
- Fagaceae
  - Castanea sativa
  - Fagus orientalis
  - Quercus boissieri
  - Quercus calliprinos
  - Quercus castaneifolia
  - Quercus macranthera
  - Quercus petraea
  - Quercus pontica
  - Quercus robur
- Hamamelidaceae
  - Parrotia persica
- Juglandaceae
  - Juglans regia
  - Pterocarya fraxinifolia
- Lauraceae
  - Laurus nobilis
- Lythraceae
  - Punica granatum
- Malvaceae
  - Tilia platyphyllos subsp. caucasica
  - Tilia tomentosa
- Moraceae
  - Ficus carica
  - Morus alba
  - Morus nigra
- Oleaceae
  - Fraxinus angustifolia var. oxycarpa
  - Fraxinus excelsior
  - Fraxinus ornus
  - Olea europaea
- Pinaceae
  - Pinus brutia
  - "Picea orientalis"
- Platanaceae
  - Platanus orientalis
- Punicaceae
  - Punica granatum
- Rhamnaceae
  - Paliurus spina-christi
  - Rhamnus pallasii
- Rosaceae
  - Crataegus laciniata
  - Crataegus tanacetifolia
  - Cydonia vulgaris
  - Malus domestica
  - Mespilus germanica
  - Prunus armeniaca
  - Prunus cerasifera
  - Prunus cerasus
  - Prunus dulcis
  - Prunus laurocerasus
  - Prunus persica (introduced by man)
  - Prunus spinosa
  - Pyrus communis
  - Sorbus aucuparia
  - Sorbus torminalis
- Rutaceae
  - Citrus aurantium
  - Citrus decumana
  - Citrus delicivsus
  - Citrus limonum (lime)
    - Citrus limonum var. dulcis
- Salicaceae
  - Populus alba
  - Populus euphratica
  - Populus nigra var. afghanica
  - Salix alba
  - Salix daphnoides
  - Salix viminalis
- Sapindaceae
  - Acer campestre
  - Acer cappadocicum
  - Acer hyrcanum
  - Acer tataricum
  - Acer trautvetteri
  - Acer velutinum
- Taxaceae
  - Taxus baccata
- Ulmaceae
  - Ulmus carpinifolia
  - Ulmus glabra
  - Zelkova carpinifolia
- Vitaceae
  - Vitis vinifera

== See also ==
- Flora of Iran
- Flora of the Indian epic period
- Trees of Western Asia
