= List of plants known as lungwort =

Lungwort is a common name for several plants and a lichen, and may refer to:

== Flowering plants ==
- Pulmonaria, a genus of flowering plants, specifically Pulmonaria officinalis
- Hieracium murorum, French or golden lungwort
- Mertensia, for example Mertensia bella
- Verbascum thapsus, bullock's lungwort, cow's lungwort, or clown's lungwort

== Lichens ==
- Lobaria pulmonaria, lungwort lichen
