= List of plants known as breadfruit =

Breadfruit may refer to:

- Breadfruit (Artocarpus altilis), a species of flowering tree widely grown for their edible fruit. It is also used to refer to the following closely related species:

- Artocarpus blancoi (tipolo or antipolo) of the Philippines
- Artocarpus mariannensis (dugdug, seeded breadfruit, or Marianas breadfruit) of Micronesia
- Artocarpus camansi (breadnut or seeded breadfruit) of New Guinea, the Maluku Islands, and the Philippines

- African breadfruit (Treculia africana), a tree species
- Highland breadfruit (Ficus dammaropsis), a tropical fig tree native to the highlands and highlands fringe of New Guinea
- Mexican breadfruit (Monstera deliciosa), a creeping vine native to tropical rainforests of southern Mexico south to Panama
