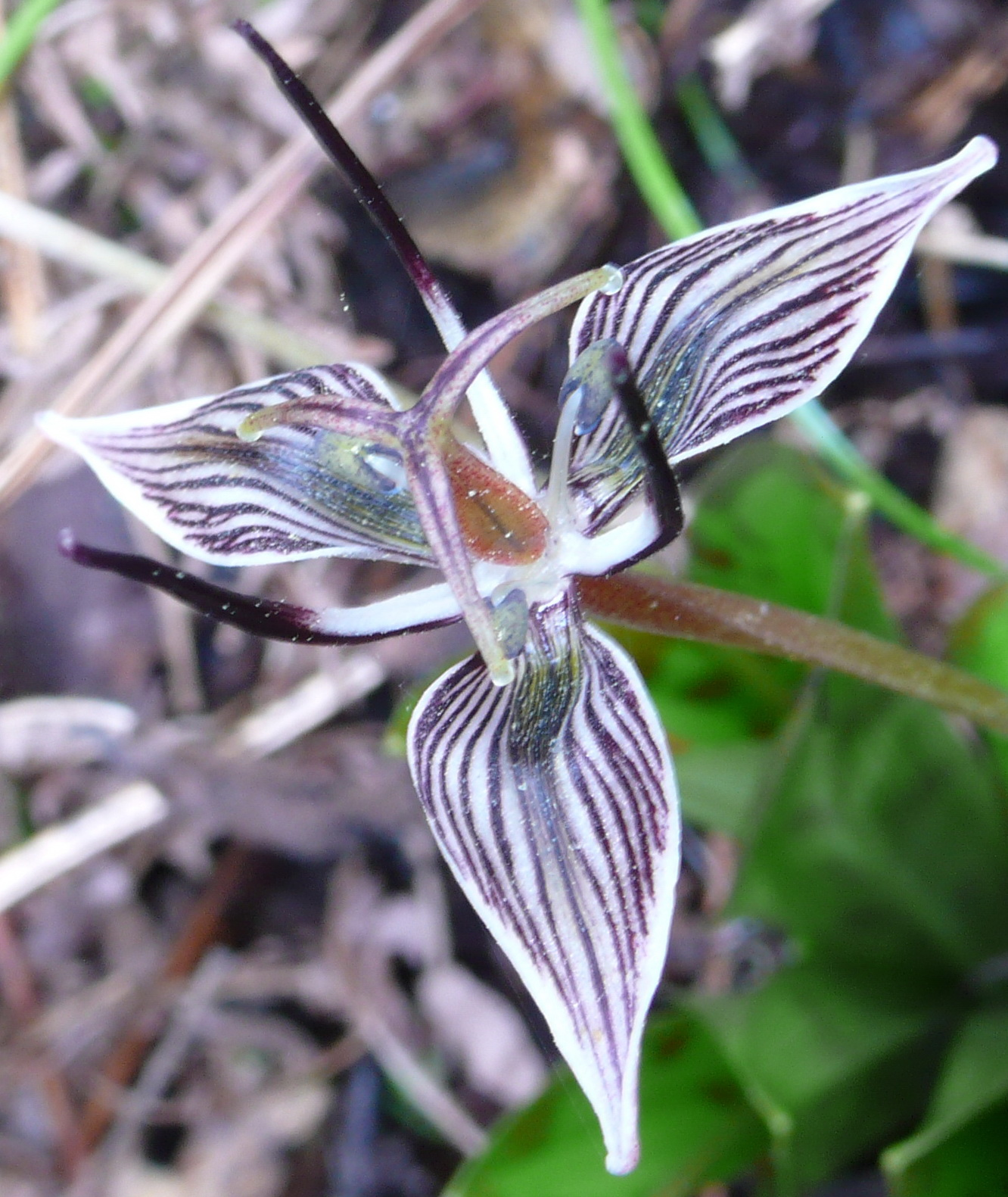
- Fetid adder's tongue Scoliopus bigelovii

Scientific classification
- Kingdom: Plantae
- Clade: Tracheophytes
- Clade: Angiosperms
- Clade: Monocots
- Order: Liliales
- Family: Liliaceae
- Subfamily: Streptopoideae
- Genus: Scoliopus; Torr.

Species
- Scoliopus bigelovii Scoliopus hallii

= Scoliopus =

Genus of plants

Scoliopus, or fetid adderstongue, is a genus of plant within the family Liliaceae consisting of two species, Scoliopus bigelovii and S. hallii. Both are found in deep shaded forests, primarily in the coastal counties of the western United States from central California to northern Oregon. The name "Scoliopus" derives from the Greek words skolios and pous, meaning curved foot, a reference to the shape of the pedicel. Taxonomists believe that Scoliopus is closely related to Calochortus, Prosartes, Streptopus and Tricyrtis, which all have creeping rhizomes as well as styles that divide at the tip.

== Description ==
Scoliopus has two mottled leaves at its base and a long pedicel that, over time, bends and twists so that the fruit touches the ground. The flowers, which bloom in the late winter and early spring, are pale green or yellow when fresh, lined with narrow purple or dark brown veins, with wide, spreading sepals and narrower petals, three stamens, and a three-angled ovary. The flower's nectaries induce insects to enter and crawl around, with pollen generally deposited on the insect's back. Fungus gnats (Sciaridae and Mycetophilidae) are the principle pollinators of Scoliopus bigelovii.

Botanist John Thomas Howell described S. bigelovii as thrusting "ill-scented flowers" from two tightly rolled leaves as soon as they sprout. By the time the leaves develop, "the first fruits are already well formed at the ends of elongate sprawling twisting pedicels."

== Species ==
Two characteristics separating the species are the shade of the flower and the regions where they grow.

Image	Scientific name	Description	Distribution
	Scoliopus bigelovii Torr.	flowers are greenish	California from Santa Cruz County to Humboldt County.
	Scoliopus hallii S.Watson	flowers are grayish-yellow.	Oregon, often along streams, on the western slopes of the Cascades and in the state's coastal mountains, ranging from near Oregon's southern border to Tillamook County.
