= List of plants known as compass plant =

Compass plant is a common name of several plants:

- Lactuca serriola, native to Europe, widely introduced to temperate regions
- Silene acaulis, also known as moss campion or cushion pink, found in the Arctic and in mountain habitats
- Silphium laciniatum, native to eastern North America
- Wyethia angustifolia, California compass plant, native to western North America
