= List of plants known as milk thistle =

Milk thistle may refer to several plants:

- Lactuca serriola
- Silybum marianum
- Various species of Sonchus, including:
  - Sonchus asper, rough milk thistle
  - Sonchus arvensis, field milk thistle
  - Sonchus oleraceus, common milk thistle

== See also ==
- Milkweed (disambiguation)
