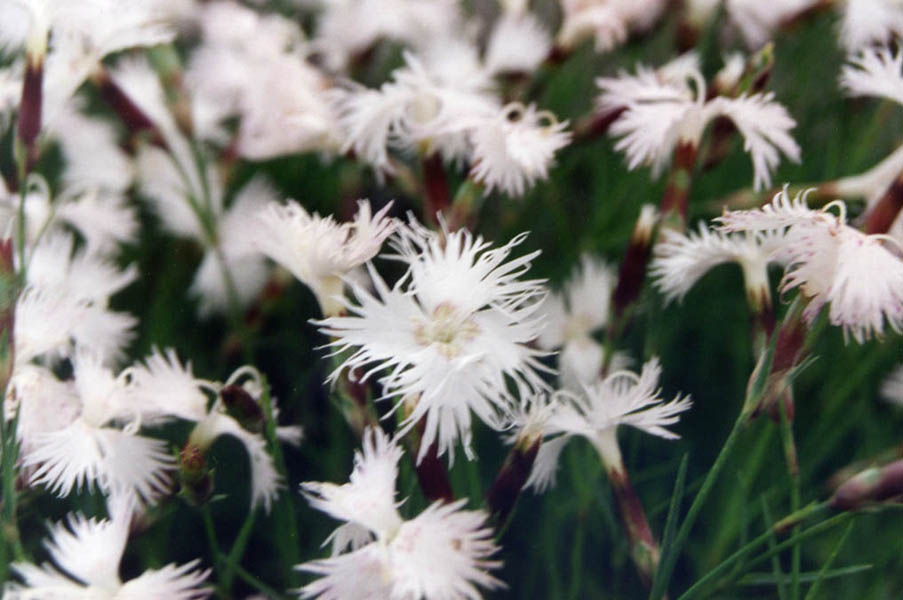

Scientific classification
- Kingdom: Plantae
- Clade: Tracheophytes
- Clade: Angiosperms
- Clade: Eudicots
- Order: Caryophyllales
- Family: Caryophyllaceae
- Genus: Dianthus
- Species: D. spiculifolius

Binomial name
- Dianthus spiculifolius Schur

= Dianthus spiculifolius =

Species of flowering plant

Dianthus spiculifolius is a species of pink native to the Carpathians; Romania, Moldova and Ukraine. Occasionally grown in rock gardens, it is available from commercial suppliers.
