= List of plants known as sea lettuce =

Sea lettuce is the common name for members of the seaweed genus Ulva. It may also refer to:

- Dudleya caespitosa, also known as the 'sand lettuce', a terrestrial flowering plant species that is endemic to coastal areas of California
- Scaevola taccada, also known as the 'beach cabbage', a terrestrial flowering plant species that is native to coastal regions of the Indo-Pacific.
- Monostroma, also known as the 'slender sea lettuce', a genus of algae.
