= List of plants known as arugula =

Arugula is a common name used to refer to several edible species of the flowering plant family Brassicaceae (mustards). These include:

- Eruca sativa, a commonly cultivated species
- Eruca vesicaria
- Diplotaxis tenuifolia (wild arugula)
