= Plants used as herbs or spices =

This page is a sortable table of plants used as herbs and/or spices. This includes plants used as seasoning agents in foods or beverages (including teas), plants used for herbal medicine, and plants used as incense or similar ingested or partially ingested ritual components.

== Table ==
Herb or spice	Species	Family	Plant form	Purposes	Parts used	Notes
Yarrow	Achillea millefolium	Asteraceae	perennial herb	culinary, medicinal, ritual	leaves	
Black cohosh	Actaea racemosa	Ranunculaceae	perennial herb	medicinal	roots, rhizomes	
Horse chestnut	Aesculus hippocastanum	Sapindaceae	tree	medicinal	seed extract	toxic if eaten raw
Ethiopian cardamom	Aframomum corrorima	Zingiberaceae	perennial herb	culinary, medicinal	seeds	
Alligator pepper, mbongo spice, hepper pepper	Aframomum daniellii and related species	Zingiberaceae	perennial herb	culinary, medicinal, ritual	seeds	
Grains of paradise	Aframomum melegueta	Zingiberaceae	perennial herb	culinary, medicinal, ritual	seeds	sometimes also called alligator pepper
Alkanet	Alkanna tinctoria	Boraginaceae	perennial herb	medicinal, dye	root	
Garlic	Allium sativum	Amaryllidaceae	perennial herb	culinary, medicinal	bulb, leaves, flowers	
Chives	Allium schoenoprasum	Amaryllidaceae	perennial herb	culinary	leaves	
Aloe vera	Aloe vera	Asphodelaceae	succulent perennial	medicinal	leaf interior, latex	
Lemon verbena	Aloysia citrodora	Verbenaceae	perennial subshrub or shrub	culinary, tea, medicinal, fragrance	leaves	
Galangal	Alpinia galanga and related species	Zingiberaceae	perennial herb	culinary, medicinal	rhizome	
Marsh mallow	Althaea officinalis	Malvaceae	perennial herb	culinary, medicinal	root, flowers, leaves	also used as a vegetable and to make candy
Black cardamom	Amomum subulatum and Lanxangia tsaoko	Zingiberaceae	perennial herb	culinary, medicinal	seeds, rhizome	
Angelica	Angelica archangelica	Apiaceae	biennial herb	culinary, medicinal	stem, leaves	also used as a vegetable
Dill	Anethum graveolens	Apiaceae	annual herb	culinary	seeds, leaves, flowers	
Chervil	Anthriscus cerefolium	Apiaceae	annual herb	culinary		
Celery	Apium graveolens	Apiaceae	biennial herb	culinary, medicinal, fragrance	leaves, seeds, roots	petiole and root used as vegetables
Horseradish	Armoracia rusticana	Brassicaceae	perennial herb	culinary	root	
Arnica	Arnica montana	Asteraceae	perennial herb	medicinal	flowers, roots	there are concerns about its toxicity
Wormwood	Artemisia absinthium	Asteraceae	perennial herb	culinary, medicinal	leaves, flowers	moderately poisonous
Tarragon	Artemisia dracunculus	Asteraceae	perennial herb	culinary, medicinal	leaves	
Mugwort	Artemisia vulgaris	Asteraceae	perennial herb	culinary, medicinal, ritual	leaves, root	also used as a vegetable
Rooibos	Aspalathus linearis	Fabaceae	shrub	tea	leaves	
Neem oil	Azadirachta indica	Meliaceae	tree	medicinal	fruits and seeds	also used as an insect repellent; leaves and flowers also eaten
Cinnamon myrtle	Backhousia myrtifolia	Myrtaceae	tree	culinary	oil	probably has antimicrobial properties; also used as insect repellent
Daisy	Bellis perennis	Asteraceae	perennial herb	tea, medicinal		leaves and flowers also eaten
Barberry	Berberis vulgaris and related species	Berberidaceae	shrub	culinary	fruit	also used for jam
Beet juice	Beta vulgaris	Amaranthaceae	herbaceous biennial	medicinal, dye	root, leaves	primarily used as a vegetable
Annatto	Bixa orellana	Bixaceae	shrub	culinary, medicinal, ritual	seeds	
Fingerroot	Boesenbergia rotunda	Zingiberaceae	herbaceous annual	culinary, medicinal, dye	rhizome	also used as a vegetable
Borage	Borago officinalis	Boraginaceae	annual herb	culinary, tea, medicinal	leaves, flowers	also used as a vegetable
Brown mustard	Brassica juncea	Brassicaceae	annual herb	culinary, medicinal	seeds	
Marigold	Calendula officinalis	Asteraceae	short-lived perennial herb	tea, medicinal, dye	flowers, leaves	also eaten as salad
Tea, matcha	Camellia sinensis	Theaceae	shrub or small tree	culinary, tea, medicinal	leaves, twigs (rarely)	
White cinnamon	Canella winterana	Canellaceae	tree	culinary	bark	
Cannabis, weed, marijuana	Cannabis sativa and related species	Cannabaceae	annual herb	medicinal, ritual	flowers, extracts	also used as a fiber plant
Caper	Capparis spinosa	Capparaceae	shrub	culinary	buds, fruits	typically pickled; leaves also edible
Chili pepper, including various named cultivars like jalapeño and habanero; paprika	Capsicum annuum and related species	Solanaceae	frost-tender perennial herb	culinary, medicinal	fruit	
Caraway	Carum carvi	Apiaceae	biennial herb	culinary, medicinal, fragrance	fruits	
Khat	Catha edulis	Celastraceae	shrub or tree	medicinal	leaves	primarily used as a recreational drug
Cornflower	Centaurea cyanus	Asteraceae	annual herb	tea, medicinal, dye	flowers, rarely leaves and seeds	
Carob	Ceratonia siliqua	Fabaceae	tree	culinary	pods	used as a chocolate substitute
Khus, vetiver	Chrysopogon zizanioides	Poaceae	perennial herb	culinary, medicinal, fragrance	root extract	
Chicory	Cichorium intybus	Asteraceae	somewhat woody perennial herb	culinary, tea	roots	also used as a vegetable (leaves and roots) and sugar substitute (roots)
Quinine	Cinchona officinalis and related species	Rubiaceae	tree	culinary (rarely), medicinal	bark	main culinary use is as tonic water
Cassia	Cinnamomum cassia	Lauraceae	tree	culinary, medicinal	bark, buds	often sold as cinnamon sticks
Indian bay leaf	Cinnamomum tamala	Lauraceae	tree	culinary, medicinal	leaves, bark (rarely)	
Cinnamon	Cinnamomum verum (and related species)	Lauraceae	tree	culinary, medicinal (some species)	bark	
Zest, chenpi, lemon/lime/orange/citron peel and leaves	Citrus limon and related species	Rutaceae	tree	culinary, medicinal, fragrance	fruit peel, leaves	fruit usually eaten
Butterfly pea, Cordofan pea	Clitoria ternatea	Fabaceae	perennial herbaceous vine	tea, medicinal, dye	flower	
Blessed thistle	Cnicus benedictus	Asteraceae	annual herb	medicinal		
Coffee	Coffea arabica and related species	Rubiaceae	tree or shrub	culinary, tea, medicinal	seeds	brewed coffee is not usually referred to as a tea
Kola nut	Cola acuminata and Cola nitida (and sometimes related species)	Malvaceae	tree	culinary, medicinal, dye, ritual	seeds	the original source of "cola", though most colas no longer use actual kola
Cuban oregano	Coleus amboinicus	Lamiaceae	semi-succulent perennial herb	culinary, fragrance	leaves	
Myrrh	Commiphora myrrha and related species	Burseraceae	small tree or shrub	culinary, medicinal, fragrance, ritual	sap/resin	
Coriander (seeds, roots), Cilantro (leaves)	Coriandrum sativum	Apiaceae	annual herb	culinary	seeds, leaves, roots	
Hawthorn	Crataegus monogyna and related species	Rosaceae	shrub or small tree	medicinal	fruit	fruit also eaten
Saffron	Crocus sativus	Iridaceae	short-lived perennial herb	culinary, medicinal, dye	stigma and style	
Cumin	Cuminum cyminum	Apiaceae	annual herb	culinary, fragrance	seeds	
Turmeric	Curcuma longa	Zingiberaceae	perennial herb	culinary, medicinal, dye	rhizome	
Lemongrass	Cymbopogon citratus and related species	Poaceae	frost-sensitive perennial herb	culinary, medicinal, fragrance	leaves	
Epazote	Dysphania ambrosioides	Amaranthaceae	annual or short-lived perennial herb	culinary, tea	leaves	also used as a vegetable
Echinacea	Echinacea angustifolia and related species	Asteraceae	perennial herb	medicinal	roots, flowers, extracts	
Peyote, mescaline	Echinopsis pachanoi and related species, also Lophophora williamsii	Cactaceae	perennial succulent	medicinal, ritual	stems	also used as a purely recreational drug
Cardamom	Elettaria cardamomum and related species	Zingiberaceae	perennial herb	culinary, medicinal	seeds	
Vietnamese balm	Elsholtzia ciliata	Lamiaceae	annual herb	culinary, medicinal	leaves, sometimes seeds	
Black cumin	Elwendia persica	Apiaceae	perennial	culinary	seeds	root also used as a vegetable
Ephedra	Ephedra sinica and related species	Ephedraceae	shrub	medicinal, ritual (disputed)		legally restricted in the US
Horsetail	Equisetum arvense	Equisetaceae	perennial herb	medicinal		also used as agricultural fungicide
Culantro	Eryngium foetidum	Apiaceae	perennial or biennial herb	culinary, medicinal	leaves	
Coca	Erythroxylum coca and E. novogranatense	Erythroxylaceae	shrub	culinary (rare), medicinal, ritual	leaves, occasionally seeds	source of the recreational drug cocaine
Eucalyptus	Eucalyptus globulus and related species	Myrtaceae	tree	tea, medicinal, fragrance	oil from leaves	
Asthma plant	Euphorbia hirta	Euphorbiaceae	annual herb	medicinal		
Pink peppercorns	Euonymus phellomanus	Celastraceae	tree or shrub	culinary	fruit	common name shared with Schinus spp
Wasabi	Eutrema japonicum	Brassicaceae	perennial herb	culinary	rhizome	
Asafoetida	Ferula foetida and related species	Apiaceae	perennial herb	culinary, medicinal	latex of rhizome or root	
Fennel	Foeniculum vulgare	Apiaceae	perennial herb	culinary, medicinal	fruit; (less commonly) flowers, leaves	
Alder buckthorn	Frangula alnus	Rhamnaceae	tall shrub	medicinal	bark, sometimes fruit	
Fumitory	Fumaria officinalis	Papaveraceae	annual herb	medicinal		poisonous
Garcinia cambogia	Garcinia gummi-gutta	Clusiaceae	tree	culinary	fruit peel, extracts	medicinal use is heavily disputed
Kokam	Garcinia indica	Clusiaceae	tree	culinary	fruit peel	also used to make beverages, and as an oilseed
Wood avens	Geum urbanum	Rosaceae	perennial herb	culinary, medicinal	root	
Ginkgo	Ginkgo biloba	Ginkgoaceae	tree	medicinal	leaves	seeds also eaten
Ground-ivy	Glechoma hederacea	Lamiaceae	perennial creeper	culinary, medicinal		used as a food preservative and salad green
Licorice	Glycyrrhiza glabra	Fabaceae	perennial herb	culinary, medicinal	root	
Cudweed	Gnaphalium uliginosum and related species	Asteraceae	annual herb	medicinal		
Witch hazel	Hamamelis virginiana (and related species?)	Hamamelidaceae	shrub	medicinal	stems, bark, leaves	
Immortelle	Helichrysum italicum	Asteraceae	tender perennial	culinary, medicinal, fragrance	leaves, flowers	also called curry plant
Hibiscus, sorrel	Hibiscus sabdariffa	Malvaceae	annual or perennial herb or woody subshrub	culinary, tea, medicinal, dye	flowers, roots (medicinal only)	leaves used as a vegetable
Sea buckthorn	Hippophae rhamnoides and related species	Elaeagnaceae	shrub	medicinal, dye	fruit	sometimes used as a fruit
Hops	Humulus lupulus	Cannabaceae	perennial climbing herb	culinary, tea, medicinal	flowers	
St. John's wort	Hypericum perforatum	Hypericaceae	slightly woody perennial herb	medicinal	leaves, flowers	
Hyssop	Hyssopus officinalis	Lamiaceae	shrub	culinary, medicinal	leaves	
Guayusa	Ilex guayusa	Aquifoliaceae	tree	culinary, tea, medicinal, ritual	leaves	
Yerba mate	Ilex paraguariensis	Aquifoliaceae	tree	tea, medicinal	leaves, twigs	
Yaupon	Ilex vomitoria	Aquifoliaceae	shrub or small tree	tea, medicinal, ritual	leaves, stems	
Star anise	Illicium verum	Schisandraceae	tree	culinary	immature fruit	
Jasmine	Jasminum officinale	Oleaceae	perennial vine	culinary, medicinal, fragrance	flowers	
Juniper berry	Juniperus communis and related species	Cupressaceae	small tree or shrub	culinary, medicinal, fragrance	cones	
Kencur	Kaempferia galanga	Zingiberaceae	perennial herb	culinary, medicinal	rhizome	one of several plants known as galangal
Cǎoguǒ	Lanxangia tsaoko	Zingiberaceae	perennial herb	culinary, medicinal	fruit	
Bay leaf	Laurus nobilis and related species	Lauraceae	tree	culinary	leaves	
Lavender	Lavandula angustifolia and related species	Lamiaceae	woody shrub	culinary, medicinal, fragrance	leaves, flowers	
Henna	Lawsonia inermis	Lythraceae	shrub or small tree	ritual	leaves	used as dye for skin, hair, and nails
Lovage	Levisticum officinale	Apiaceae	tall perennial herb	culinary	leaves, fruit	leaves and roots used as vegetables
Flax	Linum usitatissimum	Linaceae	annual herb	medicinal	seeds	also used as an oilseed and fiber crop
Koseret	Lippia abyssinica	Verbenaceae	shrubby herb	culinary, tea, medicinal	leaves	
Mexican oregano	Lippia graveolens	Verbenaceae	shrub or small tree	culinary	leaves	
Mexican bay leaf	Litsea glaucescens	Lauraceae	shrub or small tree	culinary, medicinal	leaves	
Aromatic litsea, may chang, mountain pepper, maqaw	Litsea cubeba	Lauraceae	shrub or small tree	culinary, medicinal, fragrance	fruit (or leaf) essential oil	
Magnolia-bark	Magnolia officinalis	Magnoliaceae	tree	medicinal	bark	
Horehound	Marrubium vulgare	Lamiaceae	perennial herb	culinary, tea, medicinal		
Chamomile	Matricaria chamomilla (and related species)	Asteraceae	perennial herb	culinary, tea, medicinal, fragrance	flowers	
Tea tree oil	Melaleuca alternifolia	Myrtaceae	tree or tall shrub	medicinal, fragrance	oil from leaves	toxic if eaten
Lemon balm	Melissa officinalis	Lamiaceae	perennial herb	culinary, medicinal, fragrance	leaves	
Pennyroyal	Mentha pulegium	Lamiaceae	perennial herb	culinary (rarely), medicinal	leaves	
Mint	Mentha spicata (and related species)	Lamiaceae	perennial herb	culinary, tea, medicinal, fragrance	leaves	
Kanna	Mesembryanthemum tortuosum	Aizoaceae	succulent	medicinal		
Kratom	Mitragyna speciosa	Rubiaceae	tree	medicinal	leaves	used as a recreational drug
Bitter melon	Momordica charantia	Cucurbitaceae	frost-tender perennial vine	culinary, tea	fruit	also used as a vegetable
Bergamot	Monarda didyma and related species	Lamiaceae	perennial herb	culinary, medicinal	leaves, buds	
Moringa	Moringa oleifera	Moringaceae	tree	culinary, medicinal	leaves, pods, seeds, root	used as a nutritional supplement, also eaten as a vegetable
Curry leaf	Murraya koenigii	Rutaceae	small tree	culinary, medicinal	leaves	fruit is also edible
Nutmeg (seed) and mace (seed coating)	Myristica fragrans (and related species)	Myristicaceae	tree	culinary, medicinal, fragrance	seed and seed coating	
Cicely	Myrrhis odorata	Apiaceae	perennial herb	culinary, medicinal	leaves	roots and seeds are also edible
Myrtle	Myrtus communis (and possibly related species)	Myrtaceae	shrub or small tree	culinary, medicinal, ritual	fruit, leaves/twigs	
Lotus, sacred lotus	Nelumbo nucifera	Nelumbonaceae	perennial aquatic herb	tea, medicinal	leaves, flowers, roots, seeds, fruits	Most of the plant is used as food
Catnip	Nepeta cataria	Lamiaceae	perennial herb	medicinal	leaves	
Tobacco	Nicotiana tabacum and related species	Solanaceae	annual herb	medicinal, ritual	leaves, roots, extracts	primarily used as a recreational drug
Black caraway	Nigella sativa	Ranunculaceae	annual herb	culinary, medicinal	seeds	
Basil, Thai basil, lemon basil	Ocimum basilicum, including cultivars and hybrids	Lamiaceae	annual or tender perennial herb	culinary	leaves, flowers	Some cultivars and hybrids have very different flavor profiles from sweet basil
Holy basil, tulsi	Ocimum tenuiflorum	Lamiaceae	perennial herb	culinary, tea, medicinal, ritual	leaves, stems, seeds	
Marjoram	Origanum majorana	Lamiaceae	cold-sensitive perennial herb or subshrub	culinary	leaves	
Oregano	Origanum vulgare	Lamiaceae	frost-tender perennial herb	culinary, medicinal	leaves	
Ginseng	Panax spp	Araliaceae	perennial herb	culinary, tea, medicinal	root	
Poppy seed, opium	Papaver somniferum	Papaveraceae	annual herb	culinary (poppy seeds), medicinal (opium)	seeds (culinary), latex (medicinal)	
Passionflower	Passiflora incarnata	Passifloraceae	perennial vine	culinary, medicinal	flowers, roots, extract	Primarily used as a culinary fruit
Wild rue, Syrian rue, harmal	Peganum harmala	Nitrariaceae	perennial herb	medicinal, ritual	seeds, leaves	Not closely related to true rue; used as tattoo ink
Scented geraniums	Pelargonium graveolens and many related species	Geraniaceae	shrub	culinary, medicinal (some species), fragrance	leaves	
Avocado leaves	Persea americana var. drymifolia	Lauraceae	tree	culinary	leaves	fruit usually eaten
Vietnamese coriander	Persicaria odorata	Polygonaceae	perennial herb	culinary	leaves	believed to reduce libido
Boldo	Peumus boldus	Monimiaceae	tree	culinary, tea, medicinal	leaves	fruit is also edible
Parsley	Petroselinum crispum	Apiaceae	biennial herb	culinary	leaves	root used as vegetable
Allspice	Pimenta dioica	Myrtaceae	tree	culinary	unripe fruit, leaves	
Bay rum, West Indian bay leaves	Pimenta racemosa	Myrtaceae	tree	tea, medicinal, fragrance	leaves	
Anise	Pimpinella anisum	Apiaceae	annual herb	culinary, medicinal, fragrance	seed	
Cubeb, tailed pepper	Piper cubeba	Piperaceae	perennial vine	culinary, medicinal, ritual	fruit	
Ashanti pepper	Piper guineense	Piperaceae	vine	culinary	fruit	
Long pepper	Piper longum	Piperaceae	perennial woody vine	culinary, medicinal	fruit	
Kava	Piper methysticum	Piperaceae	shrub	medicinal, ritual	root	also used recreationally
Black pepper, green pepper, white pepper	Piper nigrum	Piperaceae	perennial woody vine	culinary, medicinal	fruit, seeds	
Jamaican dogwood	Piscidia piscipula	Fabaceae	tree	medicinal	bark	toxic; also used to catch fish
Mastic	Pistacia lentiscus	Anacardiaceae	shrub or small tree	culinary, medicinal, ritual	resin	also used as chewing gum and turpentine
Plantain	Plantago lanceolata	Plantaginaceae	perennial herb	tea, medicinal	leaves, seeds	leaves also eaten
Chinese bellflower, balloonflower, platycodon	Platycodon grandiflorus	Campanulaceae	perennial herb	culinary, medicinal	roots	also eaten as a vegetable
Guava	Psidium guajava	Myrtaceae	shrub or small tree	medicinal		Primarily used as a culinary fruit
Quassia	Quassia amara and Picrasma excelsa	Simaroubaceae	shrub or tree	culinary, medicinal	extracts of stem, roots, bark, leaves, flowers, seeds	
Black mustard	Rhamphospermum nigrum	Brassicaceae	annual herb	culinary, medicinal	seeds	
Sumac	Rhus coriaria and related species	Anacardiaceae	shrub or small tree	culinary, tea, medicinal, dye, ritual	fruits	leaves and bark used to tan leather
Rose hips, rose petals	Rosa spp	Rosaceae	perennial woody shrub	culinary, tea, medicinal, fragrance	fruit, flowers	occasionally used as a fruit, often used to make jams, etc
Minnieroot, snapdragon root, feverroot	Ruellia tuberosa	Acanthaceae	biennial herb	medicinal		
Sorrel	Rumex acetosa	Polygonaceae	perennial herb	culinary	leaves	also used as a leafy vegetable
Curly dock, yellow dock, Tu Da Huang	Rumex crispus	Polygonaceae	perennial herb	medicinal	root	Leaves and seeds also eaten
Rue	Ruta graveolens	Rutaceae	perennial herb	culinary, medicinal, ritual	leaves	
Willow	Salix spp., especially Salix alba	Salicaceae	tree	medicinal	leaves, bark	
White sage	Salvia apiana	Lamiaceae	perennial woody shrub	medicinal, ritual	leaves, seeds	
Sage	Salvia officinalis	Lamiaceae	perennial woody subshrub	culinary, medicinal, ritual	leaves	
Rosemary	Salvia rosmarinus	Lamiaceae	perennial woody shrub	culinary, fragrance, ritual	leaves	
Clary sage	Salvia sclarea	Lamiaceae	biennial or short lived perennial herb	culinary, medicinal	oil, seed	
Elder	Sambucus spp	Viburnaceae	tree	culinary, tea, medicinal	flower	berry is also eaten and used as a coloring agent; toxic in large quantities
Sandalwood oil	Santalum album and related species	Santalaceae	small tree	culinary, medicinal, fragrance, ritual	oil from wood	S. album is endangered from overuse
Sassafras, Filé powder	Sassafras albidum (and sometimes related species)	Lauraceae	tree	culinary, tea, medicinal	leaves, roots	
Summer savory	Satureja hortensis	Lamiaceae	annual herb	culinary	leaves	
Winter savory	Satureja montana	Lamiaceae	perennial herb	culinary, medicinal	leaves	
Avaram	Senna auriculata	Fabaceae	tree	medicinal	leaves, flowers, roots, seeds, bark	
Pink peppercorns	Schinus molle, Schinus terebinthifolia	Anacardiaceae	tree or shrub	culinary, medicinal (S. molle, only)	fruit	common name shared with Euonymus phellomanus
Sesame	Sesamum indicum	Pedaliaceae	annual herb	culinary	seed	
Milk thistle	Silybum marianum	Asteraceae	biennial or annual herb	medicinal	seed	medicinal use highly disputed
White mustard	Sinapis alba	Brassicaceae	annual herb	culinary	seeds	also known as Brassica alba or B. hirta
Alexanders	Smyrnium olusatrum	Apiaceae	biennial herb	culinary, medicinal	leaves, seeds	entire plant is edible
Kutjera	Solanum centrale	Solanaceae	small shrub	culinary	fruit	
Blue snakeweed	Stachytarpheta cayennensis	Verbenaceae	perennial herb or shrub	medicinal	leaves	invasive species
Chickweed	Stellaria media	Caryophyllaceae	annual herb	medicinal		edible, often used in Nanakusa-no-sekku
Karvi	Strobilanthes callosa and related species	Acanthaceae	shrub	medicinal	leaf	leaves are poisonous
Aniseed myrtle	Syzygium anisatum	Myrtaceae	tree	culinary, tea	leaf	
Clove	Syzygium aromaticum	Myrtaceae	tree	culinary, medicinal, fragrance	flower bud	
Indonesian bay leaf, Indonesian laurel, Salam leaf, daun salam	Syzygium polyanthum	Myrtaceae	tree	culinary	leaves	
Costmary	Tanacetum balsamita	Asteraceae	perennial herb	medicinal	leaves	
Chocolate	Theobroma cacao	Malvaceae	small tree	culinary, tea, ritual	seeds	also eaten as a candy
Thyme	Thymus vulgaris and related species	Lamiaceae	perennial subshrub	culinary, medicinal, ritual	leaves, stems	
Ajwain, carom	Trachyspermum ammi	Apiaceae	annual herb	culinary, medicinal	fruit	
Blue fenugreek, blue melilot	Trigonella caerulea	Fabaceae	annual herb	culinary	seeds, pods, leaves	
Fenugreek	Trigonella foenum-graecum	Fabaceae	annual herb	culinary, medicinal	leaves, seeds	
Nasturtium	Tropaeolum majus	Tropaeolaceae	annual herb	culinary	unripe seed pods	leaves, flowers used as salad
California bay laurel	Umbellularia californica	Lauraceae	tree	culinary, medicinal	leaves	fruit, seed also edible
Valerian	Valeriana officinalis	Caprifoliaceae	perennial herb	medicinal	root	
Vanilla	Vanilla planifolia and related species	Orchidaceae	vine	culinary, medicinal, fragrance	fruit	
Chasteberry	Vitex agnus-castus	Lamiaceae	tree	medicinal	leaves, flowers, fruit	
Grains of Selim	Xylopia aethiopica (and occasionally related species)	Annonaceae	tree	culinary, medicinal	fruit, bark (medicinal only)	
Sichuan pepper	Zanthoxylum armatum and related species	Rutaceae	woody perennial, shrub or tree	culinary, medicinal	fruit, seeds, bark (medicinal only)	
Ginger	Zingiber officinale	Zingiberaceae	perennial herb	culinary, tea, medicinal	rhizome	

== Definitions of use categories ==
Culinary: used as a nutritionally minor flavoring component in foods or beverages

Tea: brewed in hot water to make a beverage (for primarily culinary rather than medicinal or ritual purposes)

Medicinal: used, either directly or as a simple extract such as a tea, to cause some physiological effect, usually to treat some ailment or disease

Fragrance: used to add a pleasant odor to food, medicine, or other consumed or partially consumed items (such as incense, candles, or lotions)

Dye: used to alter the color of food, medicine, or other consumed items

Ritual: ingested or partially ingested (eg used as incense) as an important component of a cultural or religious ritual

== See also ==
- List of plants used in herbalism
- List of culinary herbs and spices
