= List of plants known as figwort =

Figwort usually refers to plants in the genus Scrophularia.

Some other plants - mainly Lamiales formerly or still in the Scrophulariaceae - are also called "figwort". These include:

- Euphrasia officinalis (Red eyebright)
- Veronica officinalis (Common speedwell)
- Veronica anagallis-aquatica (Water speedwell)
- Gratiola officinalis (Common hedgehyssop)
- Bacopa monnieri (Coastal waterhyssop)
- Scoparia dulcis (Sweet broomweed)
- Ilysanthes riparia (False pimpernel)
