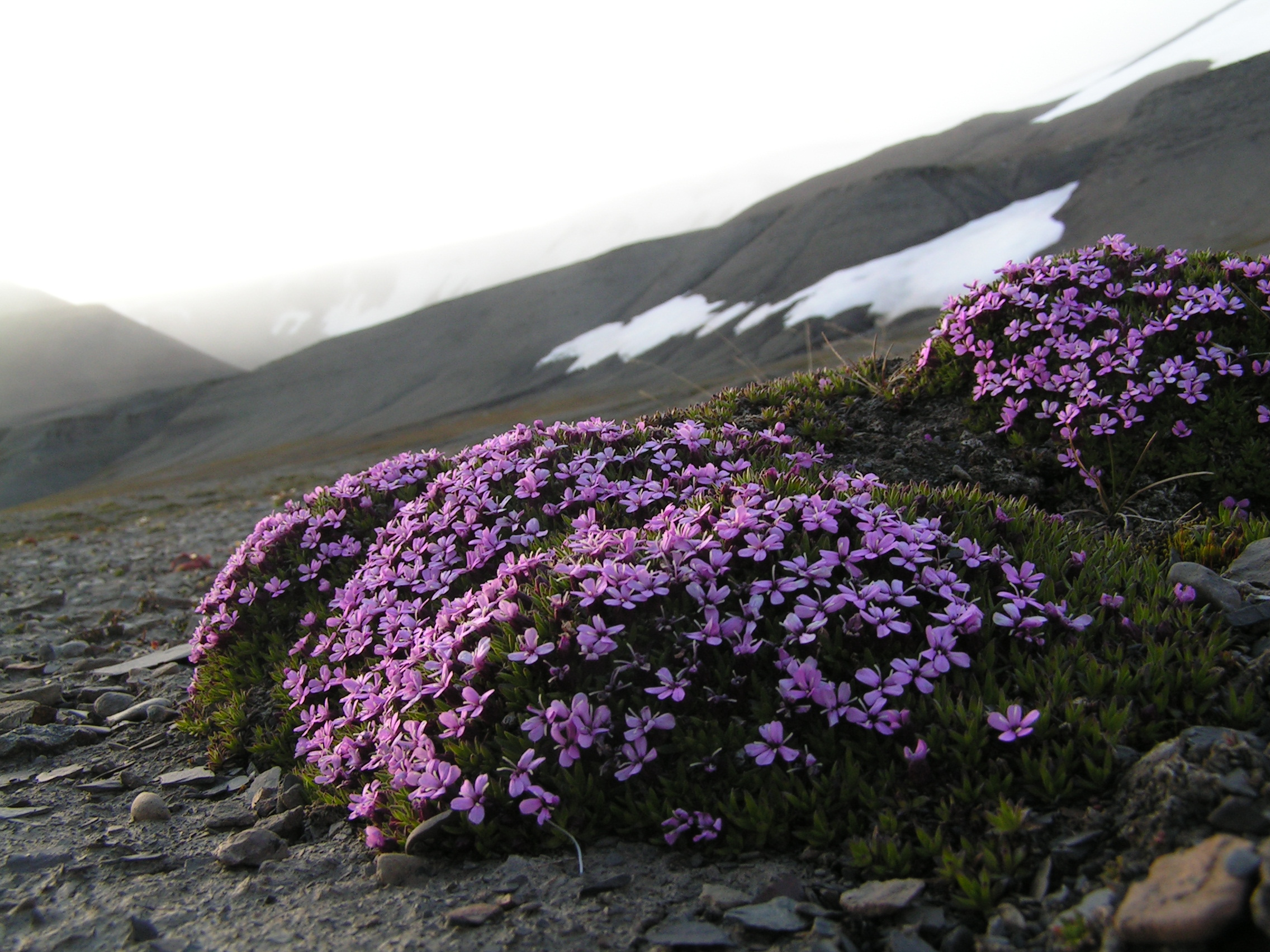
- Silene acaulis in Svalbard, Norway

Conservation status
- Secure (NatureServe)

Scientific classification
- Kingdom: Plantae
- Clade: Tracheophytes
- Clade: Angiosperms
- Clade: Eudicots
- Order: Caryophyllales
- Family: Caryophyllaceae
- Genus: Silene
- Species: S. acaulis

Binomial name
- Silene acaulis (L.) Jacq.

= Silene acaulis =

Species of flowering plant in the carnation family

Silene acaulis, known as moss campion or cushion pink, is a small wildflower that is common all over the high arctic and tundra and in high mountains of Eurasia and North America (Alps, Carpathians, southern Siberia, Pyrenees, British Isles, Iceland, Faroe Islands, Greenland, Rocky Mountains). It is an evergreen perennial flowering plant in the carnation family Caryophyllaceae.

It is also called the compass plant, since the flowers appear first on the south side of the cushion. (Various other plants also have this name.)

== Description ==
Moss campion is a low, ground-hugging plant. It may seem densely matted and moss-like. The dense cushions are up to a foot or more in diameter. The bright green leaves are narrow, arising from the base of the plant. The dead leaves from the previous season persist for years, and pink flowers are borne singly on short stalks that may be up to 2.5 centimetres (1 inch) long, but are usually much shorter.

It usually has pink flowers, though very rarely they may be white. The flowers are solitary and star-shaped. The flowers are female, male or hermaphrodite. They are between 6–12 millimetres (1/4–1/2 in) wide, with hermaphrodite flowers being larger than the female ones. Female flowers produce better quality seeds than hermaphrodites and male flowers produce better quality pollen than hermaphrodites. The cushions can change the gender of their flowers between years. Gender frequencies change with altitude, the frequency of female flowers increasing with higher elevation. They usually appear in June through August. The flowers are held by a calyx which is rather firm and thick.

The sepals are joined together into a tube that conceals the bases of the petals, which are entire. The 10 stamens and 3 styles extend well beyond the throat of the flower. The stems and leaves are very sticky and viscid, which may discourage ants and beetles from climbing on the plant. The variety exscapa has shorter flowering stems. The other variety subacaulescens, from Wyoming and Colorado, has pale pink flowers all summer.

Plants in Colorado have been estimated to reach 75 to 100 years in age, and Alaskan plants may reach 300 years. The oldest known moss campion is 350 years old and has a diameter of two feet.

== Gallery ==
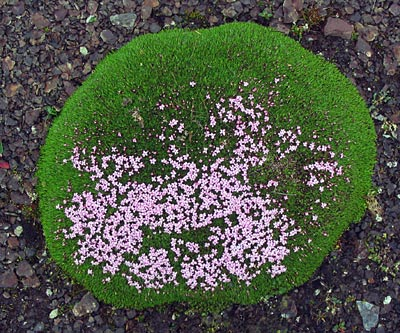
Bird's eye view, Svalbard

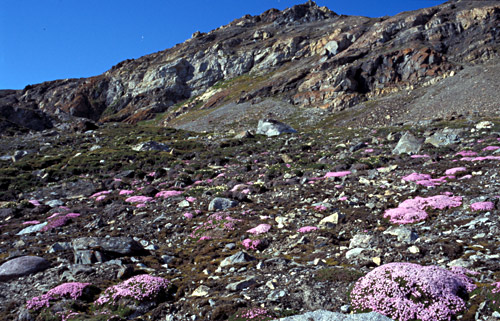
Scattered in Svalbard

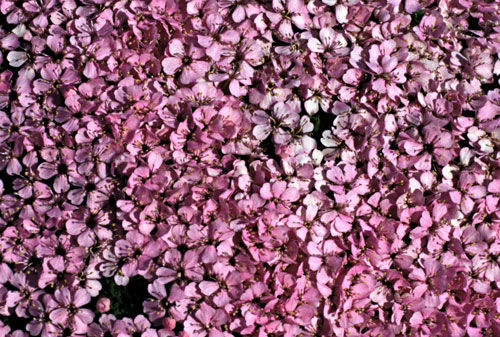
Flower tops

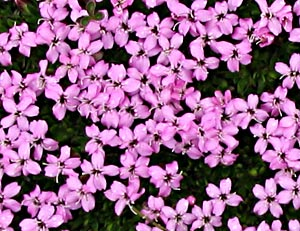
Close-up of flowers

Bloombugten Fjord on the Greenland northeast coast in September

== Distribution and habitat ==
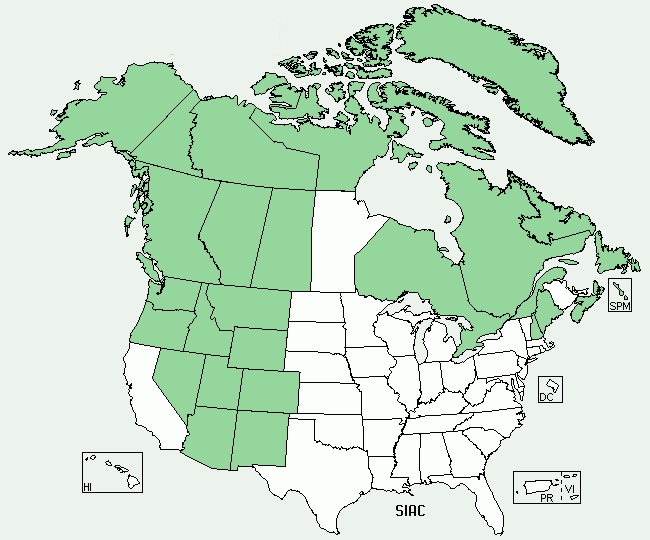
USDA North American distribution of Silene acaulis (L.) Jacq.

Moss campion is common all over the high arctic and the higher mountains of Eurasia and North America (south to the Alps, Carpathians, southern Siberia, Pyrenees, British Isles, Iceland, Faroe Islands, Rocky Mountains). In the United States it inhabits Colorado, the Bighorn Mountains of Wyoming, the Wallowa Mountains of Oregon, the Olympics, the northern Cascades of Washington, and Alaska.

Range:

- USA (AK, AZ, CO, ID, ME, MT, NH, NM, NV, OR, UT, WA, WY)
- CAN (AB, BC, LB, NF, NS, NT, NU, ON, QC, SK, YT)
- DEN (GL), FRA (SPM)

It inhabits alpine fellfield, on windswept rocky ridges and summits above treeline. It grows mainly in dry, gravelly localities, but also in damper places. With the cushions it produces its own, warmer climate with higher temperatures inside, when the sun shines.

== Ecology ==
In Maine it is possibly extirpated, and in New Hampshire Silene acaulis var. exscapa is threatened.

Experimental warming has been shown to start flowering substantially earlier than control cushions experiencing ambient temperature. Both the male and female phases developed faster in the OTCs and capsules (fruits) matured earlier, and the cushions produced more mature seeds and had a higher seed/ovule ratio contributing to an overall positive reproductive response. However, a study on four populations across a latitudinal gradient in North America showed that southern populations of moss campion had lower survival and recruitment, but higher individual growth, rates than more northern populations. Furthermore, vital rates such as growth, survival, and fruits per area were shown to increase in moderately warmer years yet declined in the very warmest years, suggesting that a change in climate into warmer conditions or more frequent unusually warm summers may eventually lead to negative impacts. Another study showed that, while the short term responses were positive, they turned negative on medium-term, suggestion that moss campion may be at risk in future global warming. Projections produced under different climate scenarios suggest that S. acaulis will likely face climate-driven fast decline in suitable areas on the British Isles and across North America, and that upward and northward shifts to occupy new climatically suitable areas are improbable in the future.

== Cultivation ==
The seeds should be sown early in the spring time. Put the seedlings into separate pots, and it is recommended to let them winter in the greenhouse for their first winter season. It is advised to plant them in the late spring or early summer because division takes place in the spring. They should be grown in well-drained soil with full sun. The climate can be cool.

== Toxicity ==
There is no listing that moss campion is toxic, though it does have saponins which, though toxic, are hard to absorb in the body. They can be broken down by thorough cooking. Its advised to not consume large amounts of this plant.

== Uses ==
The plant used to be used for children with colic. The raw root skin plants were consumed as a vegetable in Iceland and in Arctic regions.

== See also ==
- Flora of Svalbard
