= List of crops known as peas =

Many crop plants are known as peas, particularly

- Pisum sativum
  - pea
  - marrowfat peas
  - snap pea
  - snow pea
  - split pea

and:

- chickpea, Cicer arietinum
- cowpea, Vigna unguiculata
  - black-eyed pea, Vigna unguiculata subsp. unguiculata
- earth pea, Vigna subterranea
- Swainsona formosa, Sturt's desert pea
- several species of Lathyrus, including:
  - sweet pea, Lathyrus odoratus
- pigeon pea, Cajanus cajan

== See also ==
- Pea flower
- Pea flour
- Peanut or goober peas
