= Velvet tamarind =

Velvet tamarind is a common name for several trees in the genus Dialium and may refer to:

- Dialium cochinchinense, native to southeast Asia
- Dialium guineense, native to Africa
- Dialium indum, native to south and southeast Asia
