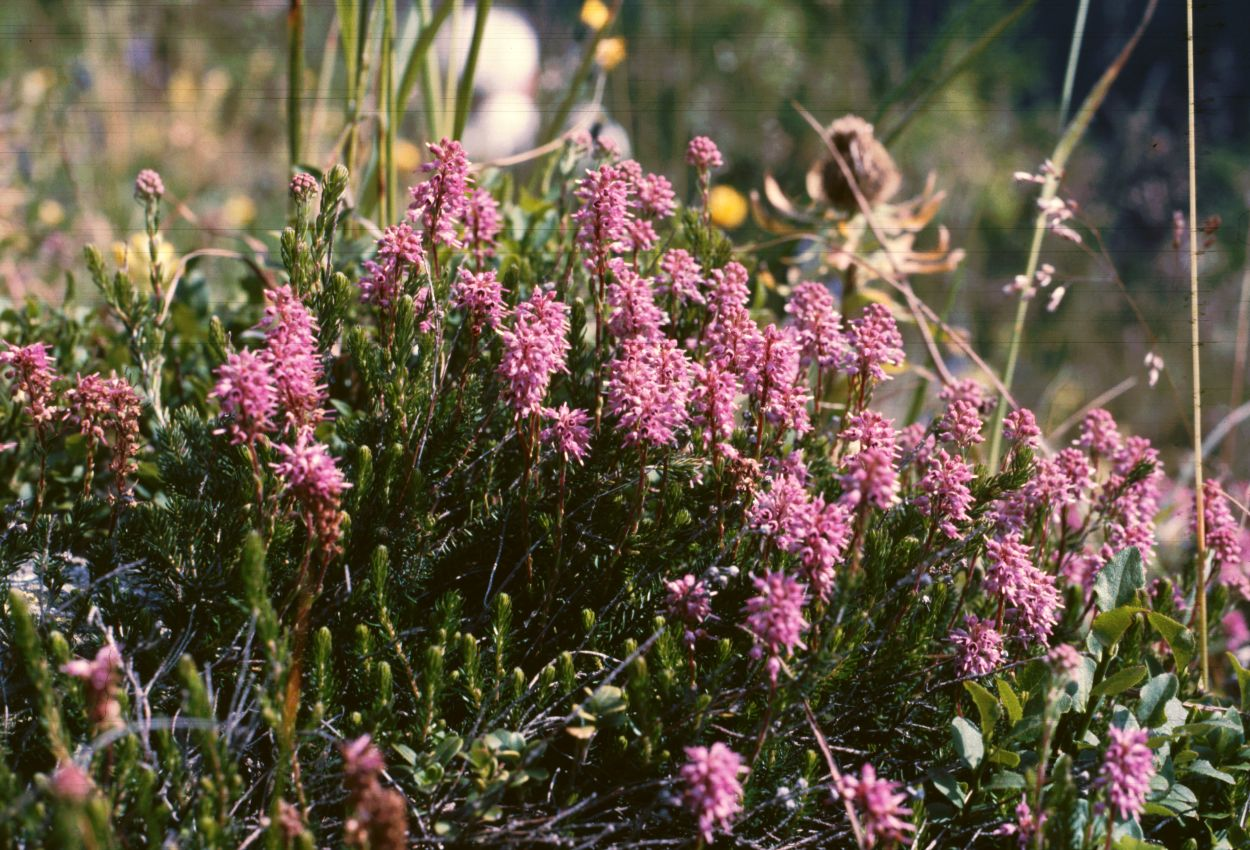

Scientific classification
- Kingdom: Plantae
- Clade: Tracheophytes
- Clade: Angiosperms
- Clade: Eudicots
- Clade: Asterids
- Order: Ericales
- Family: Ericaceae
- Genus: Erica
- Species: E. spiculifolia

Binomial name
- Erica spiculifolia Salisb.

Synonyms
- Bruckenthalia spiculifolia (Salisb.) Rchb.; Bruckenthalia spiculifolia f. albiflora D.C.McClint.; Erica bruckenthalii (Baumg.) Spreng.; Erica olympiaca Sibth. ex Salisb.; Erica spiculifolia f. albiflora (D.C.McClint.) E.C.Nelson & D.C.McClint.; Erica transsylvanica Willd. ex Klotzsch; Menziesia bruckenthalii Baumg.

= Erica spiculifolia =

Genus of flowering plants

Erica spiculifolia, commonly known as spike heath or Balkan heath, is a species of plant in the Erica genus, native to southeastern Europe and northern Asia Minor. It is a dwarf evergreen shrub and heath-like plant to 10 in high. Leaves are dark green. The flowers are rose-pink and bell-shaped, appearing in terminal clusters in early summer. It was first identified in 1802.

It inhabits sub-alpine areas with acid soils up to 2,800 meters elevation in the mountains of southeastern Europe (Romania, Bulgaria, Bosnia and Herzegovina, Serbia, Montenegro, North Macedonia, Albania, and Greece) and northern Turkey.

== Cultivation ==
The plant prefers sandy peat with lime-free. Propagate from seed, cuttings or division. It is suitable for rock gardens and borders.
