= List of plants known as buckthorn =

The buckthorns are two closely related genera (formerly often treated together as one genus) of shrubs or small trees in the family Rhamnaceae; the name is also often applied to the family as a whole:

- Rhamnaceae
  - Rhamnus
  - Frangula

Buckthorn, often hyphenated, may also refer to:

- Hippophae rhamnoides (sea-buckthorn)
- Sideroxylon lanuginosum (false buckthorn or wooly buckthorn)
