= List of plants known as sour cherry =

Sour cherry commonly refers to cultivars of Prunus cerasus. It can also refer to:

- Prunus cerasoides
- Prunus pseudocerasus
- Syzygium corynanthum, a common Australian tree

== See also ==
- Dwarf cherry
- Prunus emarginata, bitter cherry
- Prunus virginiana, choke cherry
