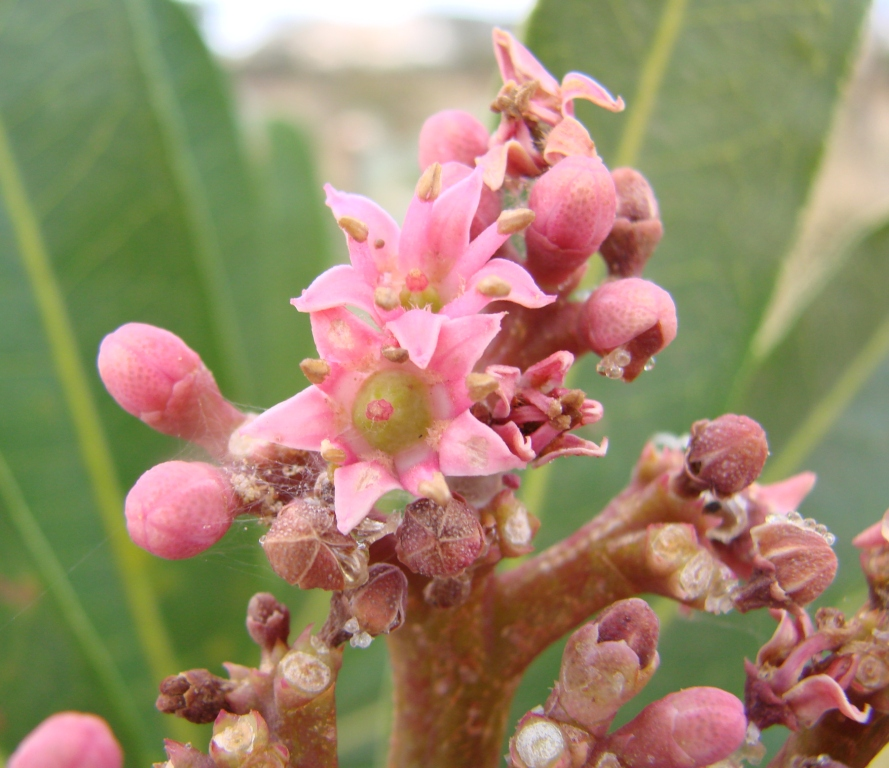
- Hortia oreadica

Scientific classification
- Kingdom: Plantae
- Clade: Tracheophytes
- Clade: Angiosperms
- Clade: Eudicots
- Clade: Rosids
- Order: Sapindales
- Family: Rutaceae
- Subfamily: Zanthoxyloideae
- Genus: Hortia; Vand.

= Hortia =

Genus of flowering plants

Hortia is a genus of plants in family Rutaceae, with 10 species native to Central America and northern South America.

== Species ==
Species include:

- Hortia arborea Engl.
- Hortia brasiliana Vand. ex DC.
- Hortia coccinea Spruce ex Engl.
- Hortia excelsa Ducke
- Hortia longifolia Benth. ex Engl.
- Hortia neblinensis Maguire & B.M.Boom
- Hortia nudipetala Groppo
- Hortia oreadica Groppo, Kallunki & Pirani
- Hortia regia Sandwith — bush orange
- Hortia superba Ducke
- Hortia vandelliana Groppo
