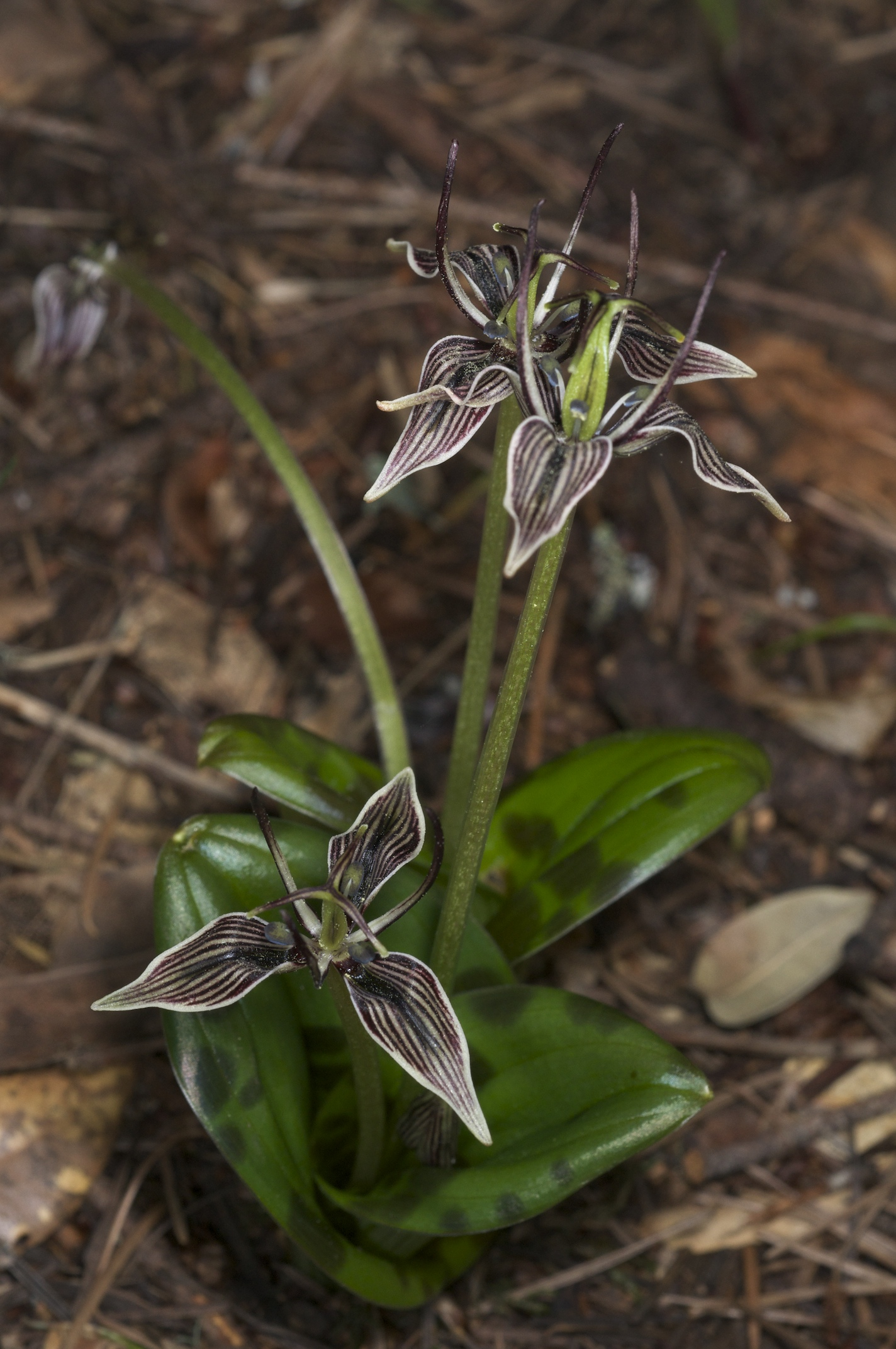

Scientific classification
- Kingdom: Plantae
- Clade: Tracheophytes
- Clade: Angiosperms
- Clade: Monocots
- Order: Liliales
- Family: Liliaceae
- Genus: Scoliopus
- Species: S. bigelovii

Binomial name
- Scoliopus bigelovii Torr.

= Scoliopus bigelovii =

Species of flowering plant

Scoliopus bigelovii is a species of flowering plant in the lily family (Liliaceae) known by several common names, including California fetid adderstongue, Bigelow's adderstongue, slinkpod, and brownies. It is native to California, where it is known from the Santa Cruz Mountains, parts of the San Francisco Bay Area, and North Coast Ranges. It has also been collected just over the border in Oregon.

Scoliopus bigelovii occurs in old-growth forests in the shaded understory of redwood trees. It was first described in a botanical report for the United States government in 1857.

== Description ==
This herbaceous perennial, one of two species of the Scoliopus genus, grows from a rhizome and a small section of underground stem. The above-ground parts include two large leaves each up to 24 cm × 10 cm (9.4 in × 3.9 in). There are sometimes 3 or 4 leaves. They have several longitudinal veins and are green with darker green or purplish mottling. The inflorescence is actually an umbel of flowers, but the peduncle is mostly underground with 3 to 12 flower-bearing pedicels rising above the surface, appearing separate. The flower has three flat, spreading, pointed oval or lance-shaped sepals and three narrower, linear or fingerlike petals. The sepals are pale or greenish and striped or streaked with dark purple. The flower has a disagreeable scent. The three short stamens are located at the bases of the sepals. The style has three long, often curving branches. The fruit is a capsule. As it matures, the pedicel that bears it twists or droops down to bring it in contact with the substrate.

While the maximum lifespan of this species is unknown, there have been reports of mature plants living for at least 20 years in wild populations.

== Distribution and habitat ==
Scoliopus bigelovii is an understory species that grows beneath redwood (Sequoia sempervirens) trees in forests along the California coast. It grows in mossy, moist places, often in shade. Populations are distributed within 50 miles of the Pacific Ocean from the southernmost region of Santa Cruz County to the northernmost region of Humbolt County. It has also been collected in Curry County, Oregon, within 6 miles of the California border.

Other associated species include tanoak (Notholithocarpus densiflorus), big leaf maple (Acer macrophylum), California bay laurel (Umbellularia californica), and Douglas fir (Pseudotsuga menziesii), all of which contribute to the unique micro-habitat in which this plant lives. A study by Hanover, A., & Russell, W. (2018) found that S. bigelovii is especially sensitive to forest management activities such as logging and selective harvesting, citing evidence of population decline in areas that have been disturbed.

=== Ecology ===
The flower is pollinated by fungus gnats of the genera Mycetophilla, Sciara, and Corynoptera when in bloom during the months of January and February. Seeds are dispersed in May and June by a variety of ant species, including Formica fusca, Formica rufibaris, and Aphaenogaster subterranea, in a process called myrmecochory.

== Evolution and taxonomy ==
The genus Scoliopus is believed to have emerged around 5 million years ago during the early Pilocene epoch.

Scoliopus bigelovii was first collected by John Milton Bigelow during the Whipple Railroad Route Expedition in a region of California he called "Tamul Pass." Today, this location is known as Mount Tamalpais in Marin County.

The taxonomic authority of Scoliopus bigelovii belongs to John Torrey (author abbreviation Torr.). He described this plant for the first time in Volume 4 of the 12-part series “Reports of explorations and surveys: to ascertain the most practicable and economical route for a railroad from the Mississippi River to the Pacific Ocean" made under the direction of the Secretary of War This species has been known to science for over a century, tracing back to 1857 when the volume was originally published.

== Gallery ==
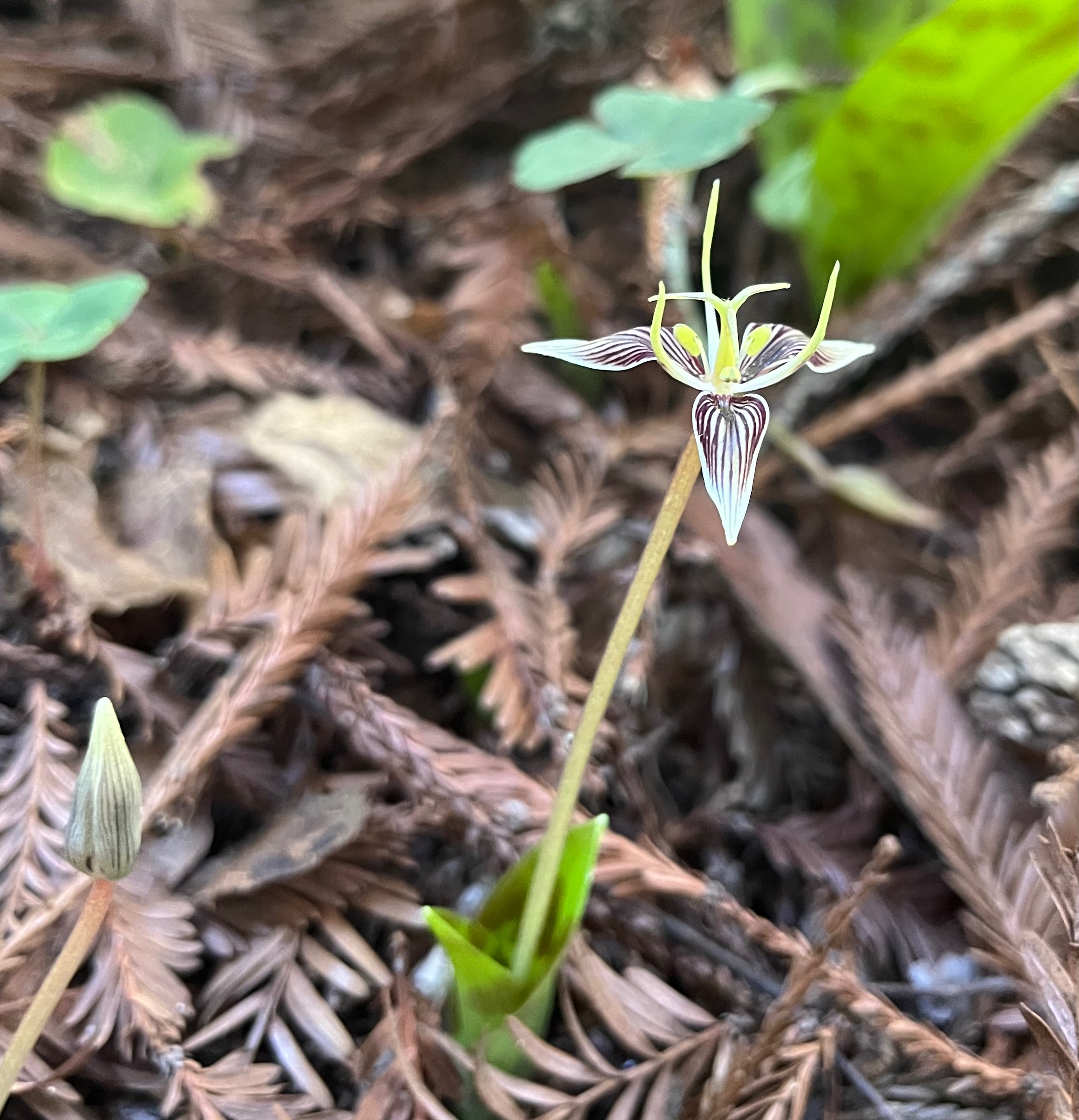
A flower of the California native plant Scoliopus bigelovii bearing light green petals and stamina.

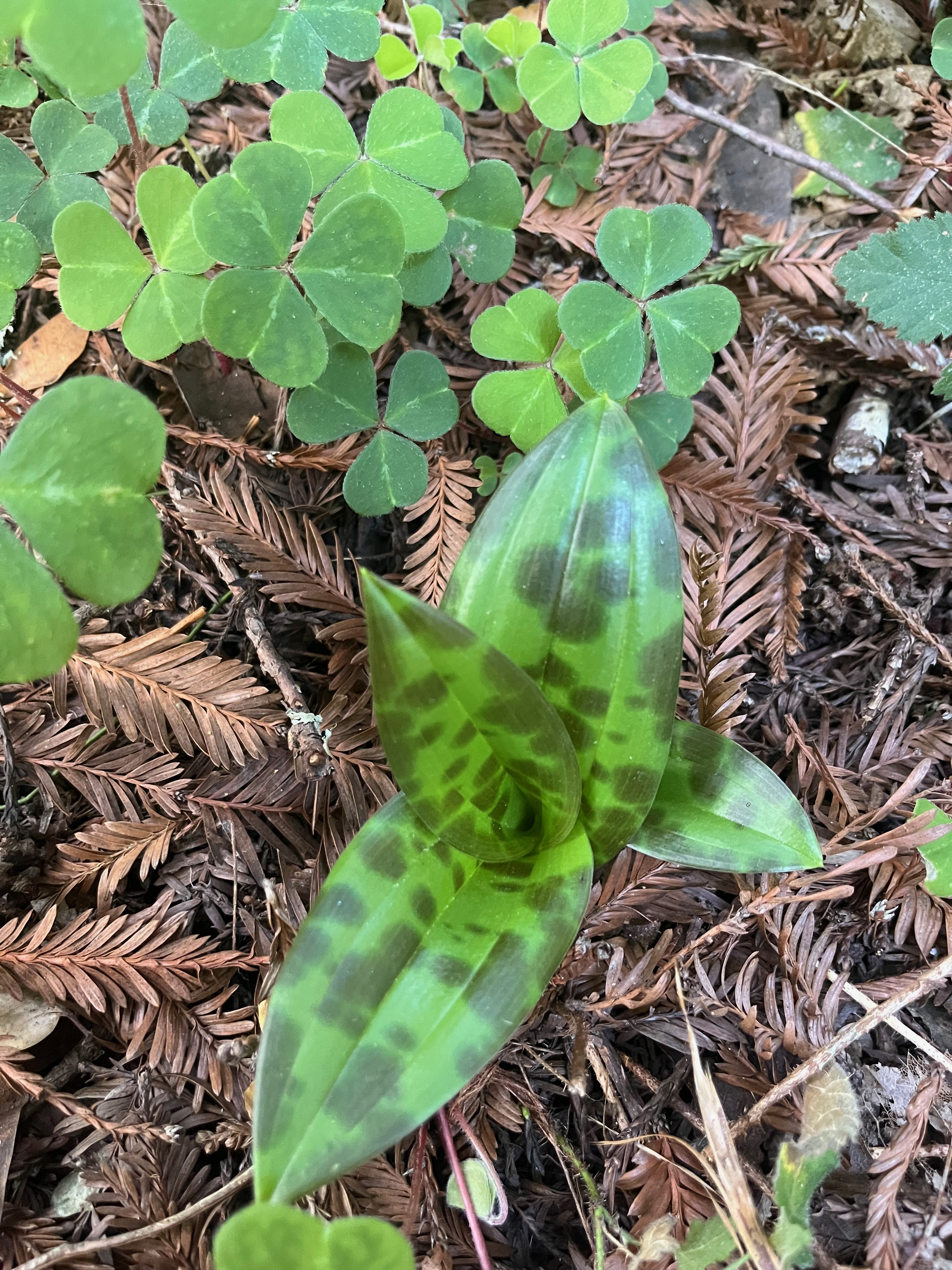
Emerging leaves of the California native plant Scoliopus bigelovii with parallel venation and distinct purple to brown mottling.

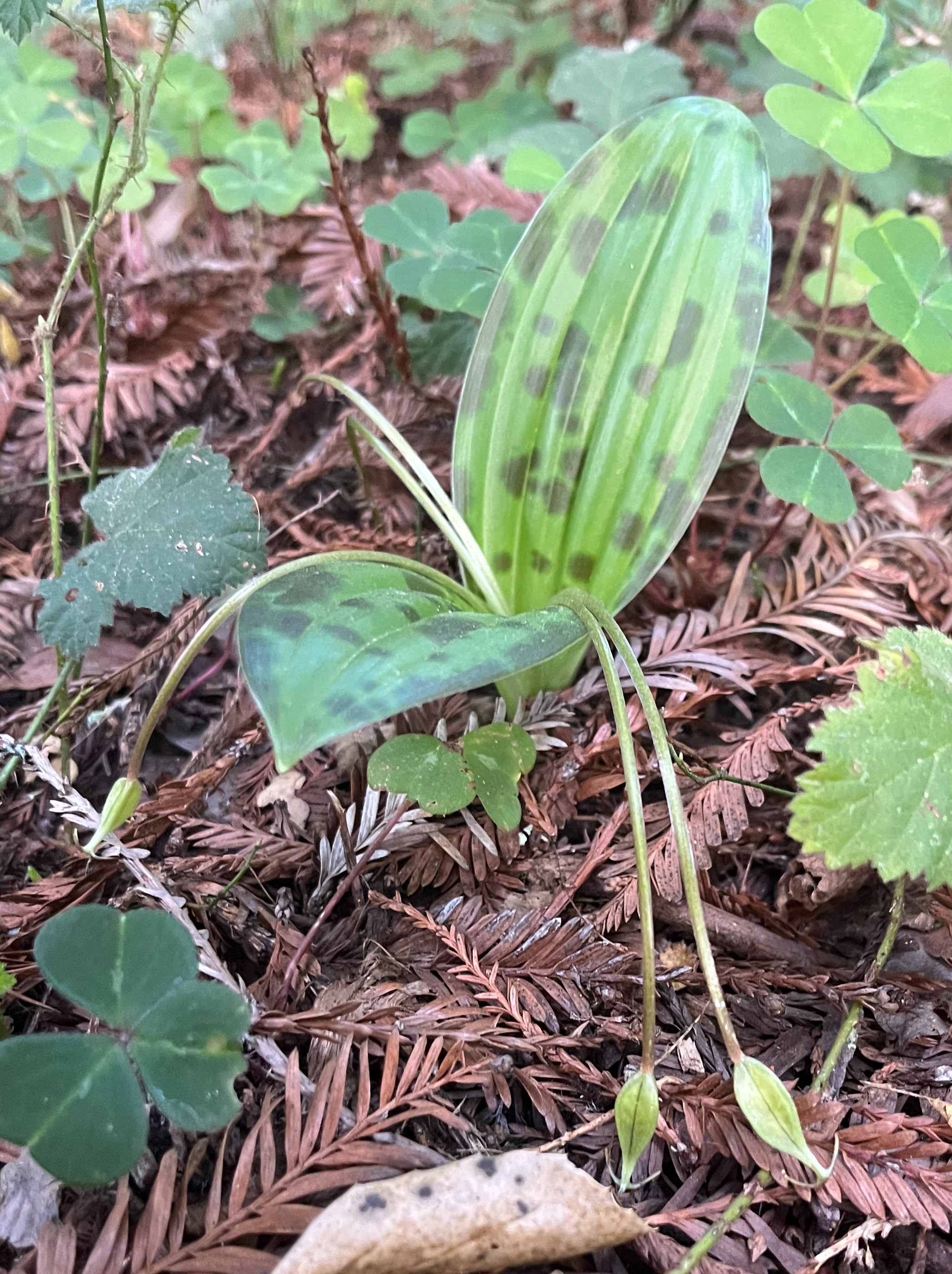
Leaves of Scoliopus bigelovii with drooping pedicels for ant seed dispersal.

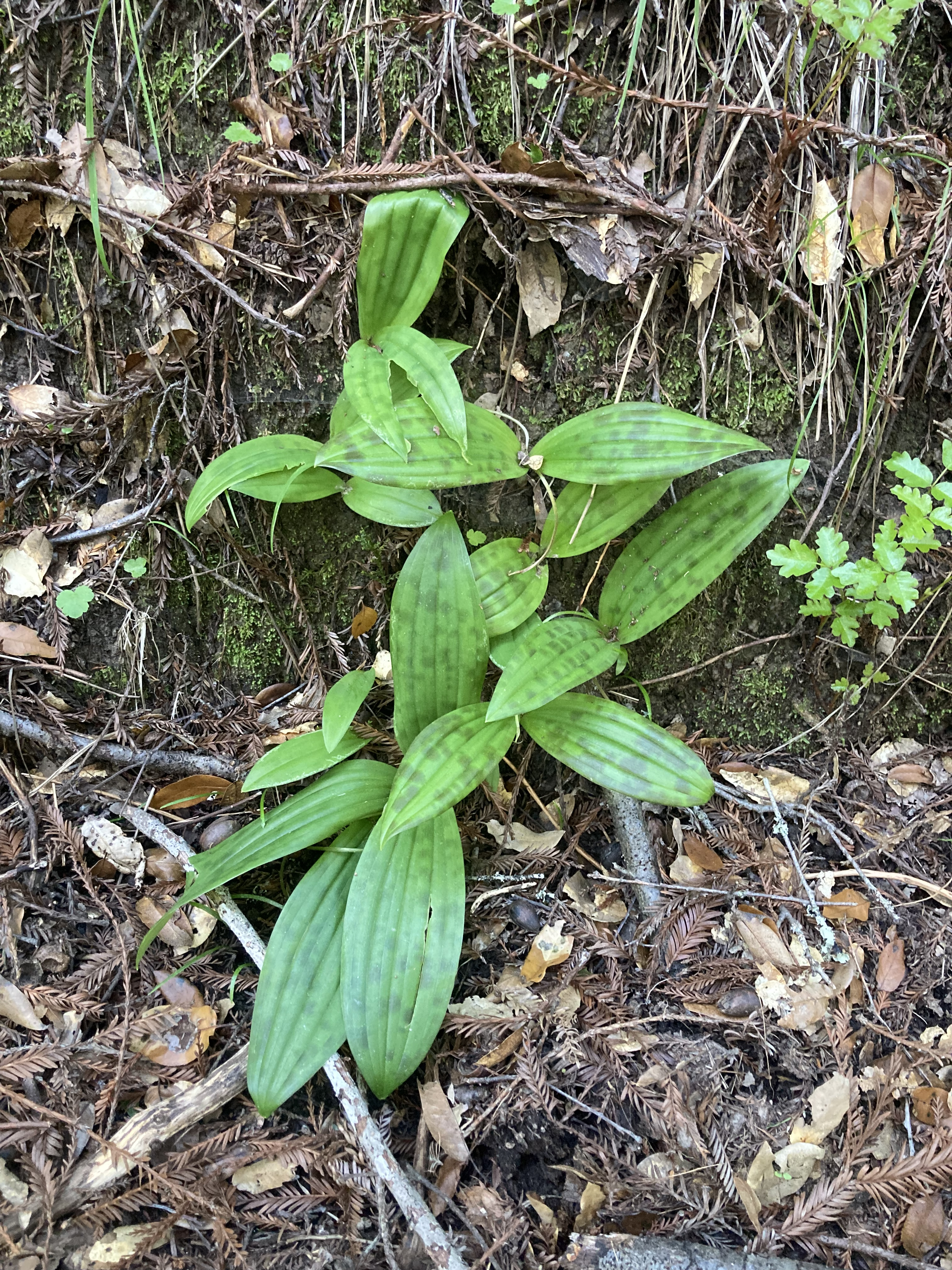
Scoliopus bigelovii at Henry Cowell Redwoods.
