= Lists of trees =

A listing of lists of trees.

== General list ==
- List of individual trees, including actual and mythical trees
- List of largest giant sequoias
- List of old growth forests
- List of oldest trees
- List of superlative trees
  - List of superlative trees in Sweden
- List of tallest trees
- List of tree genera
- List of trees and shrubs by taxonomic family

== By location ==
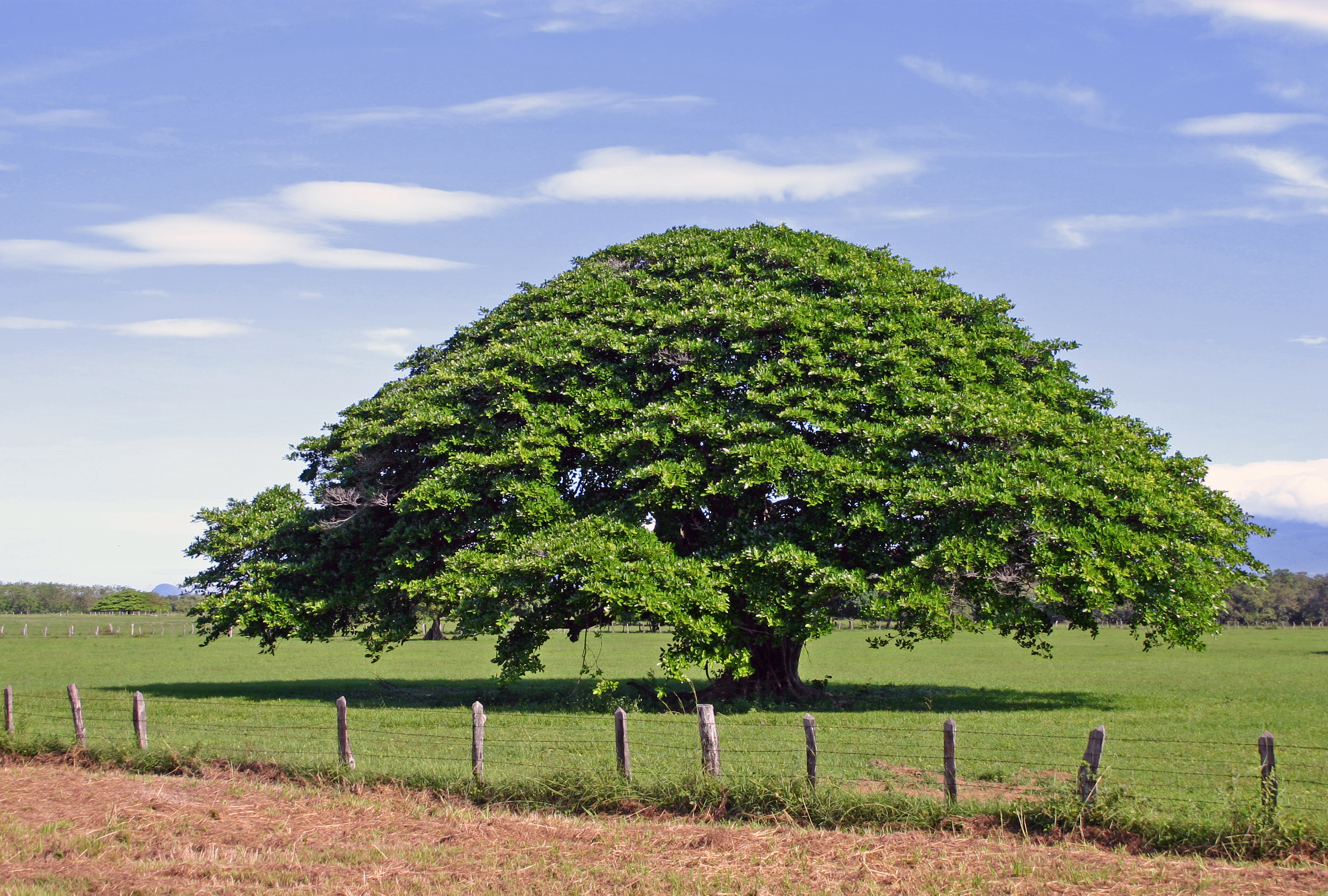
Enterolobium cyclocarpum, a tree of the Caribbean

Tamarindus indica, a tree in India

Africa

- Trees of Africa
- List of Southern African indigenous trees and woody lianes

Americas

- Trees of the Caribbean Basin
- Trees of Northern America
  - Trees of Canada
    - List of trees of Quebec
  - List of Minnesota trees by family
  - List of Minnesota trees by scientific name

Asia

- Trees of India
- Trees of Iran
- Trees of Pakistan

Australasia

- Trees of Australia
- List of trees native to New Zealand

Europe

- List of trees of Great Britain and Ireland
- List of indigenous trees and shrubs of Lithuania
- List of superlative trees in Sweden
