= List of Minnesota trees by scientific name =

This is a list of Minnesota trees, both native and introduced, organized by scientific name.

== A ==
- Abies balsamea (balsam fir; native)
- Acer ginnala (Amur maple; introduced from Asia)
- Acer negundo (boxelder; native)
- Acer nigrum (black maple; native)
- Acer platanoides (Norway maple; introduced from Eurasia)
- Acer rubrum (red maple; native)
- Acer saccharinum (silver maple; native)
- Acer saccharum (sugar maple; native)
- Acer spicatum (mountain maple; native)
- Aesculus hippocastanum (European horsechestnut; introduced from Europe)
- Aesculus glabra (Ohio buckeye; introduced from the eastern United States)

== B ==
- Betula alleghaniensis (yellow birch; native)
- Betula nigra (river birch; native)
- Betula papyrifera (paper birch; native)

== C ==
- Carpinus caroliniana (American hornbeam, blue beech, ironwood; native)
- Carya cordiformis (bitternut hickory; native)
- Carya ovata (shagbark hickory; native)
- Celtis occidentalis (hackberry; native)

== E ==
- Elaeagnus angustifolia (Russian olive; introduced from Asia)

== F ==
- Frangula alnus (glossy buckthorn, alder buckthorn; introduced from Eurasia)
- Fraxinus americana (white ash; native)
- Fraxinus nigra (black ash; native)
- Fraxinus pennsylvanica var. pennsylvanica (red ash; native)
- Fraxinus pennsylvanica var. lanceolata (green ash; native)

== G ==
- Gleditsia triacanthos (honey locust; native)
- Gymnocladus dioicus (Kentucky coffeetree; native)

== J ==
- Juglans cinerea (butternut; native)
- Juglans nigra (black walnut; native)
- Juniperus virginiana (eastern juniper, red cedar; native)

== L ==
- Larix laricina (tamarack, eastern larch; native)

== M ==
- Morus rubra (red mulberry; native)

== O ==
- Ostrya virginiana (ironwood, hophornbeam)

== P ==
- Pinus banksiana (jack pine; native)
- Pinus resinosa (red pine, Norway pine; native)
- Pinus strobus (white pine; native)
- Pinus sylvestris (Scots pine; introduced from Eurasia)
- Picea abies (Norway spruce; introduced from Eurasia)
- Picea glauca (white spruce; native)
- Picea mariana (black spruce; native)
- Populus alba (white poplar; introduced from Eurasia)
- Populus balsamifera (balsam poplar; native)
- Populus deltoides (eastern cottonwood; native)
- Populus grandidentata (bigtooth aspen; native)
- Populus tremuloides (quaking aspen; native)
- Prunus pensylvanica (pin cherry; native)
- Prunus serotina (black cherry; native)
- Prunus virginiana (chokecherry; native)

== Q ==
- Quercus alba (white oak; native)
- Quercus macrocarpa (bur oak; native)
- Quercus bicolor (swamp white oak; native)
- Quercus prinus (chestnut oak; native)
- Quercus muehlenbergii (chinkapin oak; native)
- Quercus rubra (northern red oak; native)
- Quercus velutina (black oak; native)
- Quercus ellipsoidalis (northern pin oak; native)

== R ==
- Rhamnus cathartica (common buckthorn; introduced from Eurasia)
- Rhamnus frangula; see Frangula alnus
- Robinia pseudoacacia (black locust; introduced from the eastern United States)

== S ==
- Salix amygdaloides (peachleaf willow; native)
- Salix nigra (black willow; native)
- Sorbus americana (American mountain ash; native)
- Sorbus decora (showy rowan; native)

== T ==
- Tilia americana (basswood; native)
- Thuja occidentalis (eastern arborvitae, white cedar; native)
- Tsuga canadensis (eastern hemlock; native)

== U ==
- Ulmus americana (American elm; native)
- Ulmus rubra (slippery elm; native)
- Ulmus pumila (Siberian elm; introduced from Asia)
- Ulmus thomasii (rock elm; native)

== See also ==
- Lists of Minnesota trees
