= Lists of Minnesota trees =

There are two lists of Minnesota trees organized in distinct ways:

- List of Minnesota trees by family
- List of Minnesota trees by scientific name
