= List of indigenous trees and shrubs of Lithuania =

This is a list of the native woody plant species of Lithuania. The most common trees, shrubs, subshrubs, and liana species are marked with a star (*). The list contains 98 woody and semi-woody plant species.

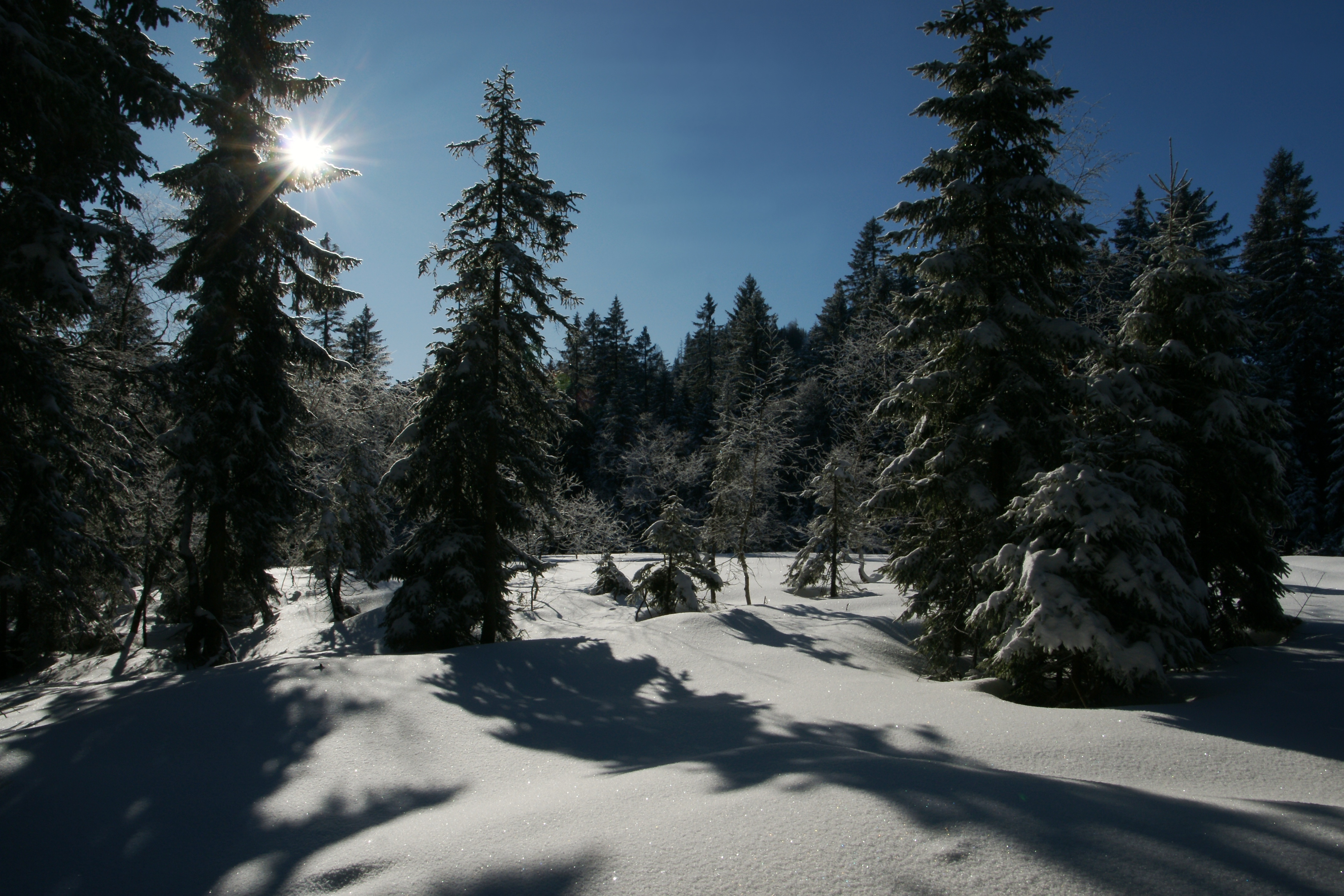
Norway Spruce (Picea abies; Paprastoji eglė)

== Trees ==
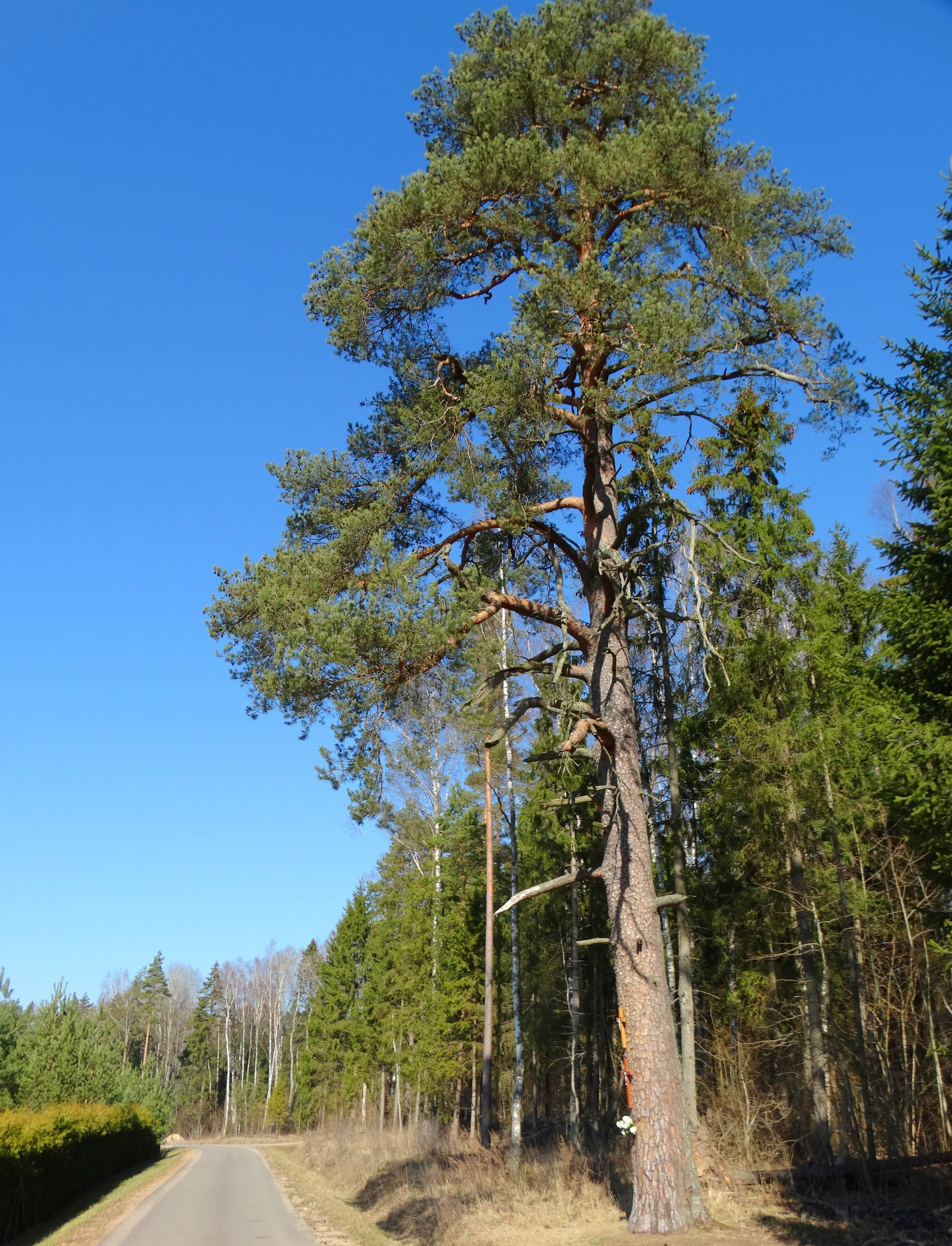
Scots Pine (Pinus sylvestris; Paprastoji pušis)

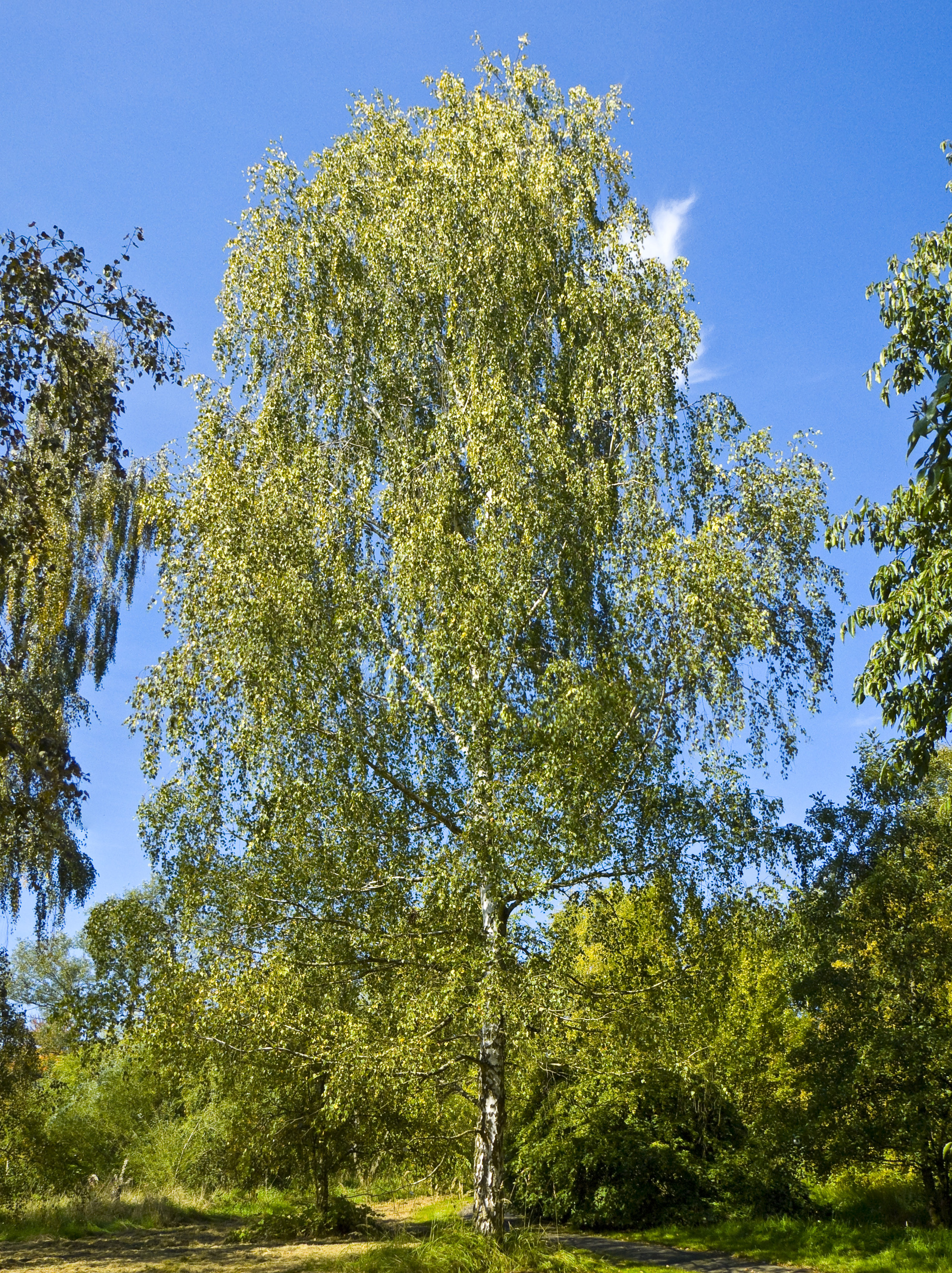
Silver Birch (Betula pendula; Karpotasis beržas)

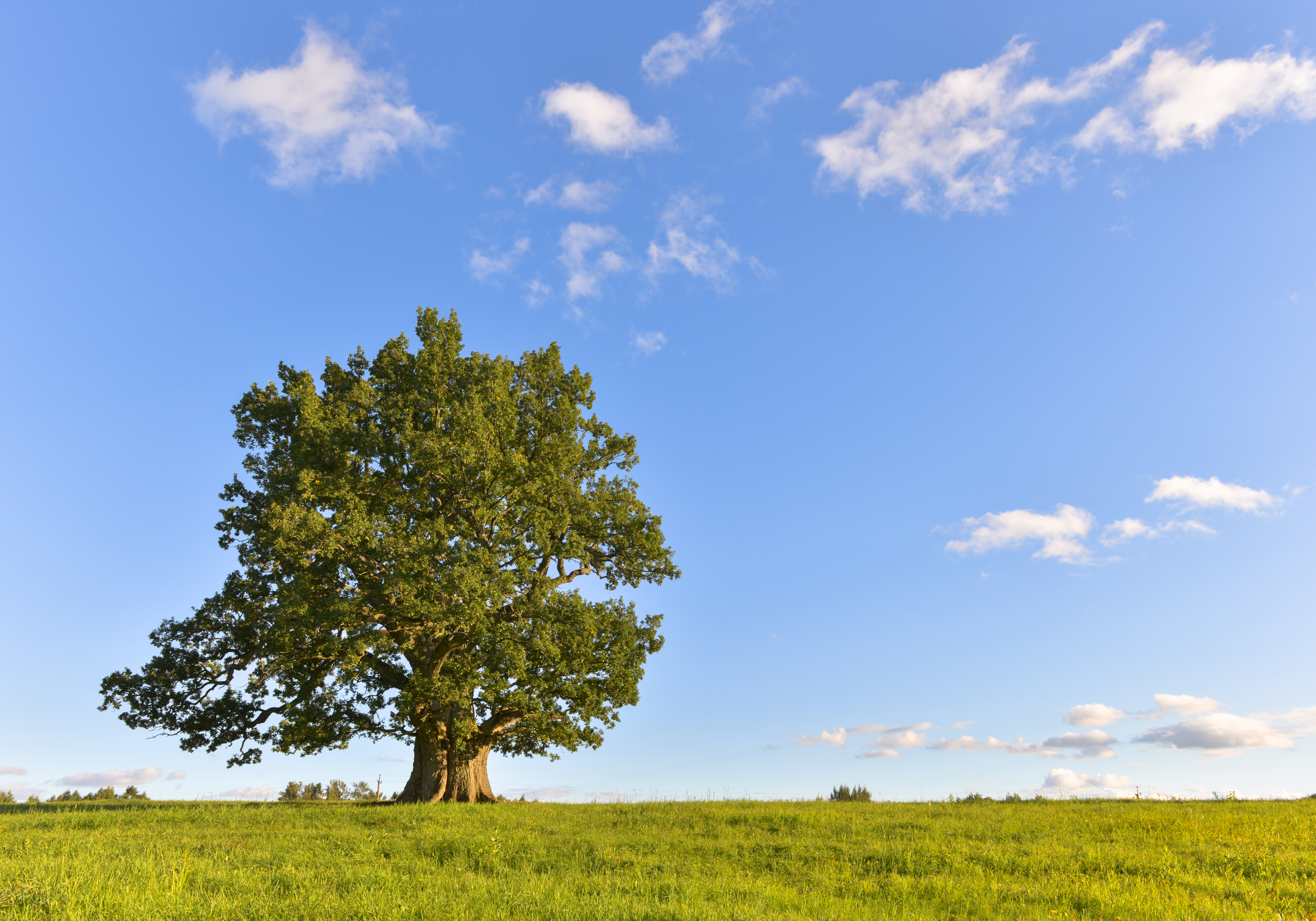
English Oak (Quercus robur; Paprastasis ąžuolas)

=== Conifers ===
(Latin: Pinophyta; Lithuanian: Pušūnai)

1. European Larch (Latin: Larix decidua; Lithuanian: Europinis maumedis)
2. Norway Spruce (Picea abies; Paprastoji eglė)*
3. Scots Pine (Pinus sylvestris; Paprastoji pušis)*
4. European Yew (Taxus baccata; Europinis kukmedis)

=== Flowering plant ===
(Latin: Magnoliophyta; Lithuanian: Magnolijūnai)

1. Norway Maple (Acer platanoides; Paprastasis klevas)
2. Common Alder (Alnus glutinosa; Juodalksnis)*
3. Grey Alder (Alnus incana; Baltalksnis)*
4. Silver Birch (Betula pendula; Karpotasis beržas or Beržas svyruoklis)*
5. Downy Birch (Betula pubescens; Plaukuotasis beržas)*
6. Common Hornbeam (Carpinus betulus; Paprastasis skroblas)
7. Common Beech (Fagus sylvatica; Paprastasis bukas)
8. Common Ash (Fraxinus excelsior; Paprastasis uosis)
9. European Crab Apple (Malus sylvestris; Miškinė obelis)
10. Black Poplar (Populus nigra; Juodoji tuopa)
11. Common Aspen (Populus tremula; Drebulė or Epušė)*
12. European Wild Pear (Pyrus pyraster; Miškinė kriaušė)
13. Sessile Oak (Quercus petraea; Bekotis ąžuolas)
14. English Oak (Quercus robur; Paprastasis ąžuolas)
15. White Willow (Salix alba; Baltasis gluosnis)
16. Crack Willow (Salix fragilis; Trapusis gluosnis)
17. European Rowan (Sorbus aucuparia; Paprastasis šermukšnis)
18. Small-Leaved Lime (Tilia cordata; Mažalapė liepa)
19. Wych Elm (Ulmus glabra; Kalninė guoba)
20. European White Elm (Ulmus laevis; Paprastoji vinkšna)
21. Field elm (Ulmus minor; Paprastasis skirpstas)

== Small trees or large shrubs ==
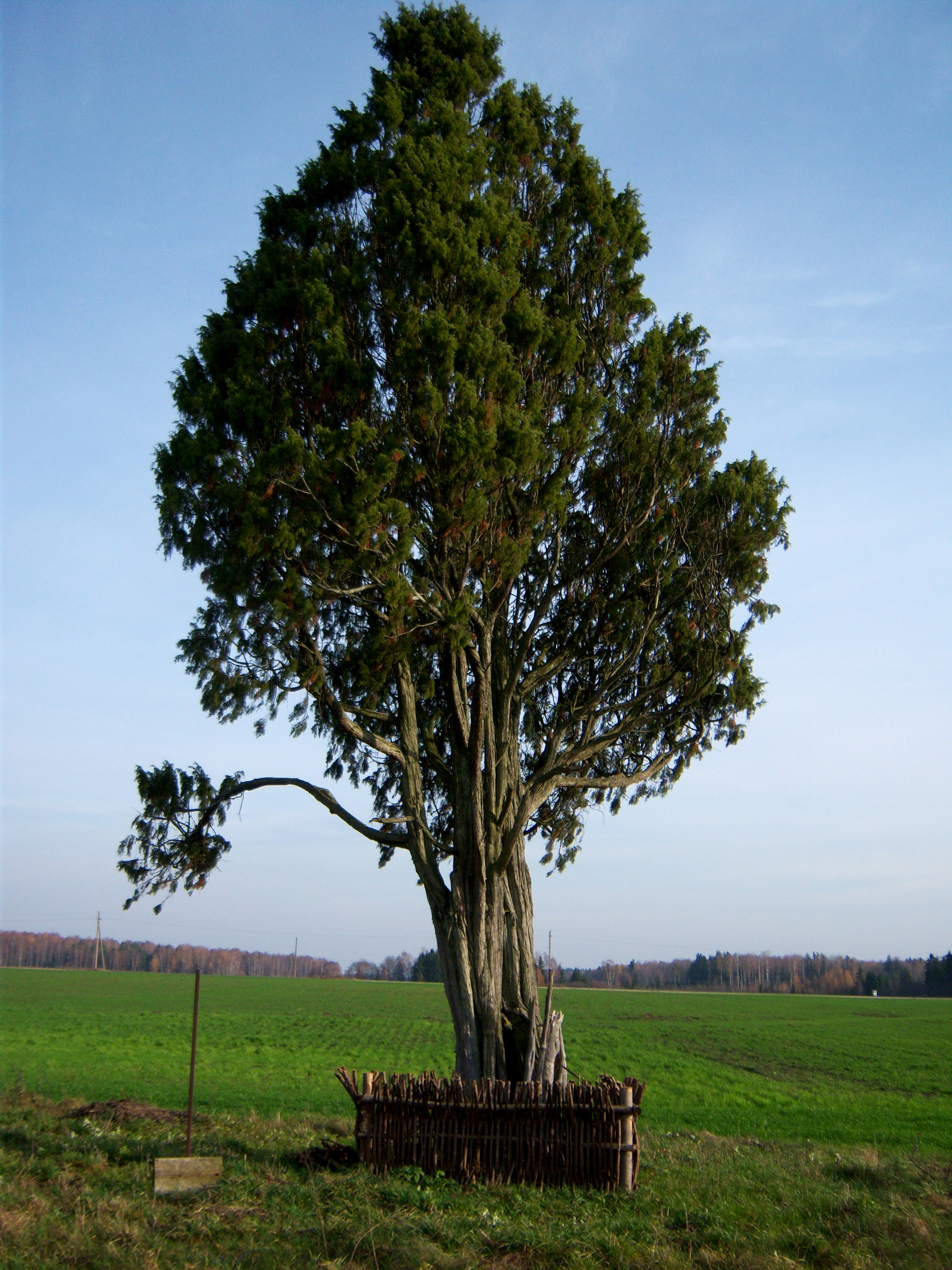
Common Juniper (Juniperus communis; Paprastasis kadagys)

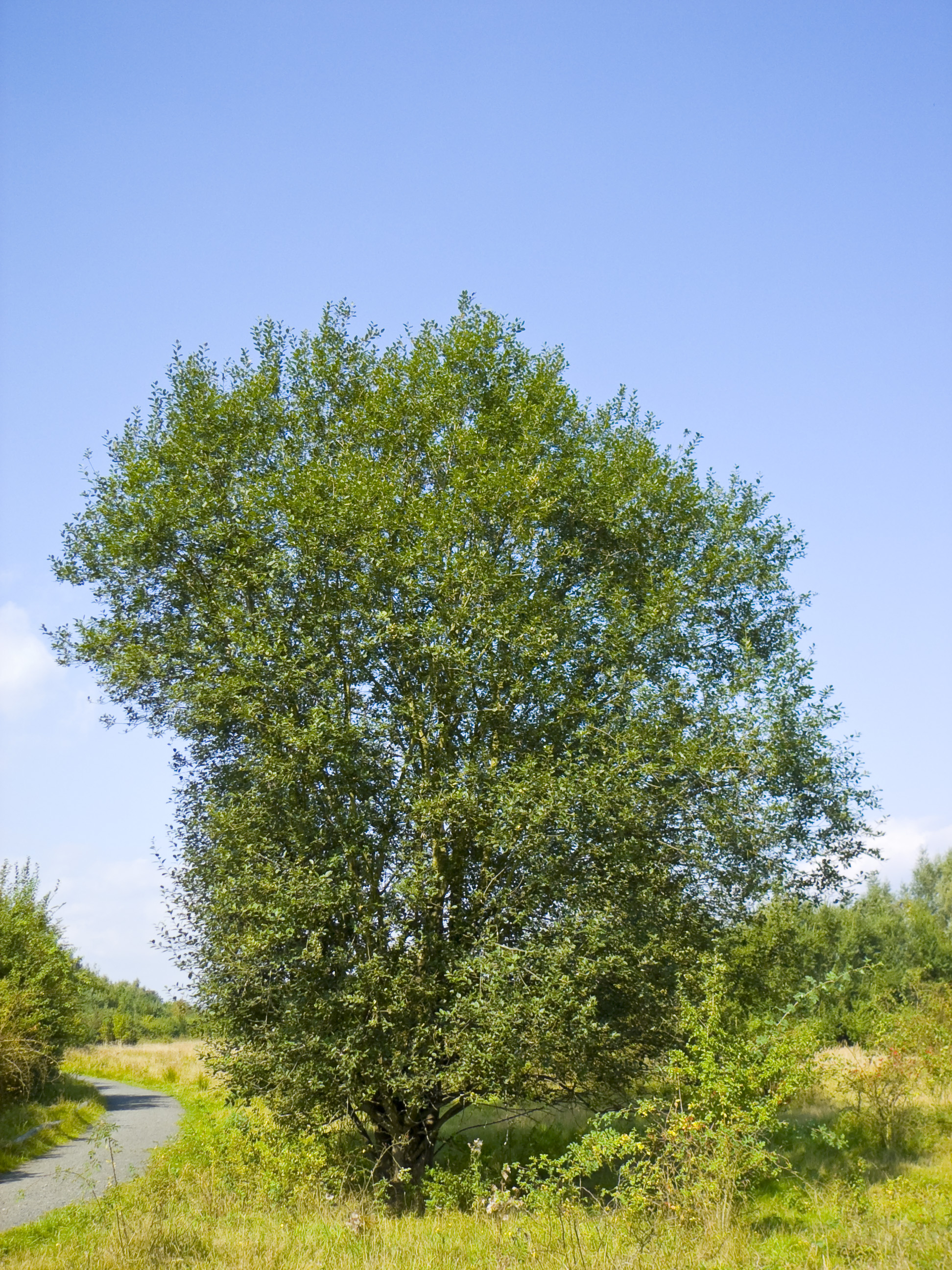
Goat Willow (Salix caprea; Blindė)

=== Conifers ===
(Latin: Pinophyta; Lithuanian: Pušūnai)

1. Common Juniper (Latin: Juniperus communis; Lithuanian: Paprastasis kadagys or Ėglius)*

=== Flowering plant ===
(Latin: Magnoliophyta; Lithuanian: Magnolijūnai)

1. Common Hazel (Corylus avellana; Paprastasis lazdynas)
2. Crataegus laevigata (Crataegus laevigata; Grauželinė gudobelė)
3. Common Hawthorn (Crataegus monogyna; Vienapiestė gudobelė)
4. Crataegus rhipidophylla (Crataegus rhipidophylla; Miškinė gudobelė)
5. Common Spindle (Euonymus europaeus; Europinis ožekšnis)
6. Alder Buckthorn (Frangula alnus; Paprastasis šaltekšnis)
7. Sour Cherry (Prunus cerasus; Paprastoji vyšnia)
8. Bird Cherry or Hackberry (Prunus padus; Paprastoji ieva)
9. Blackthorn or Sloe (Prunus spinosa; Dygioji slyva)
10. Common Buckthorn (Rhamnus cathartica; Dygioji šunobelė)
11. Long-Leaved Violet Willow (Salix acutifolia; Smailialapis gluosnis)
12. Goat Willow (Salix caprea; Blindė)*
13. Grey Willow (Salix cinerea; Pilkasis karklas sin. Pilkasis gluosnis)
14. Violet Willow (Salix daphnoides; Pajūrinis gluosnis)
15. Salix gmelinii (Salix gmelinii; Ilgalapis gluosnis)
16. Salix myrsinifolia (Salix myrsinifolia; Juosvasis karklas)
17. Bay Willow (Salix pentandra; Virbinis gluosnis)*
18. Almond Willow or Almond-Leaved Willow (Salix triandra; Krantinis gluosnis)*
19. Common Osier (Salix viminalis; Žilvitinis karklas)*

== Shrubs ==
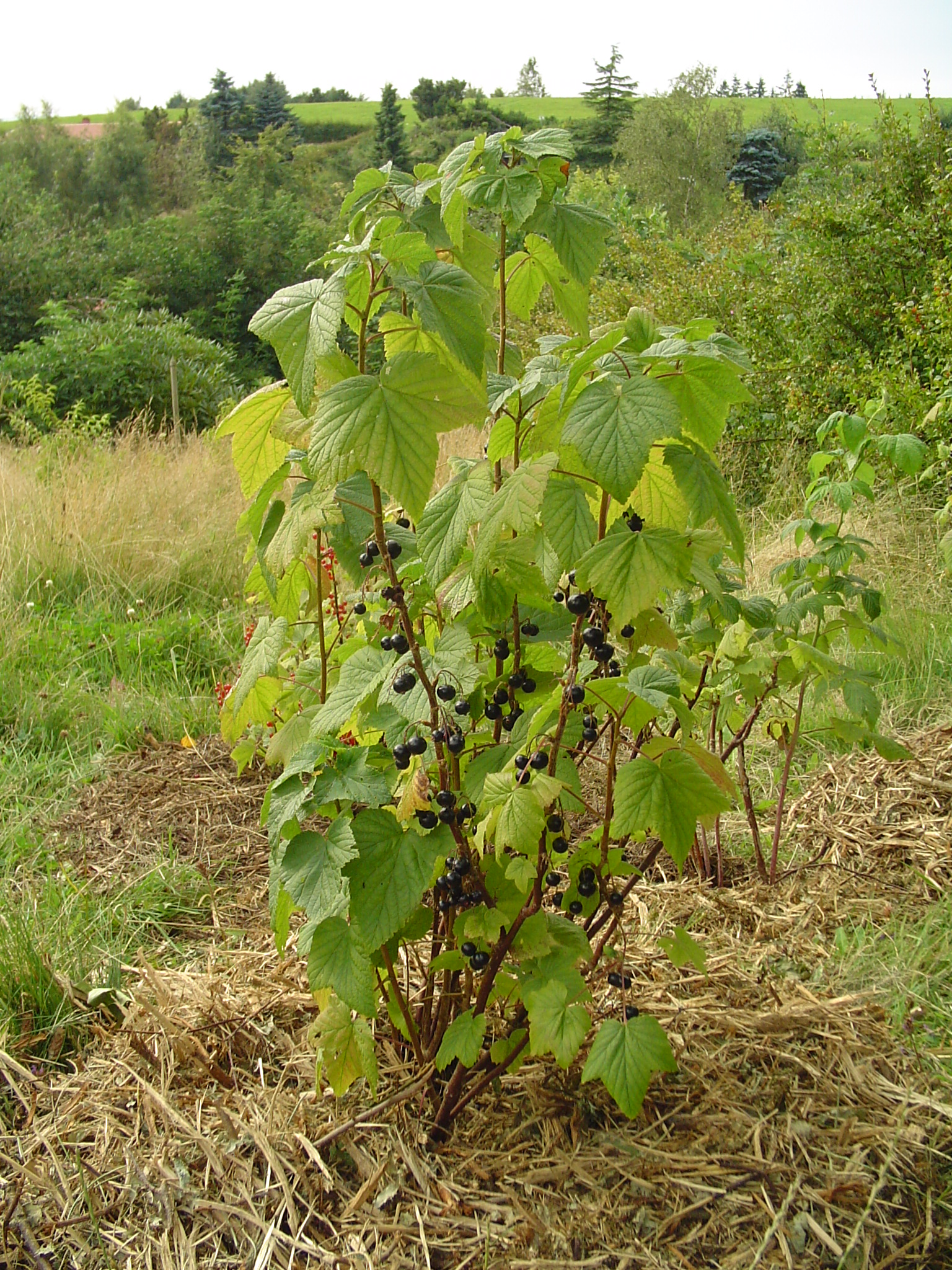
Blackcurrant (Ribes nigrum; Juodasis serbentas)

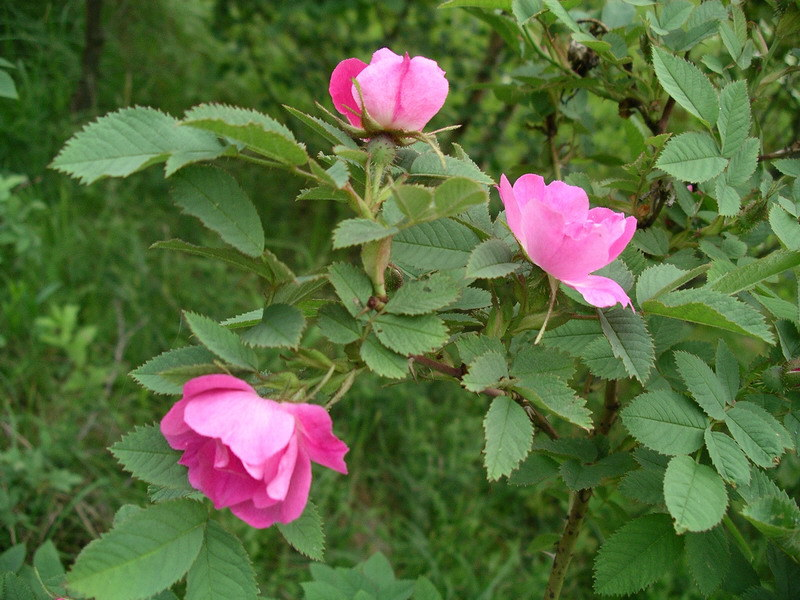
Dog Rose (Rosa canina; Paprastasis erškėtis)

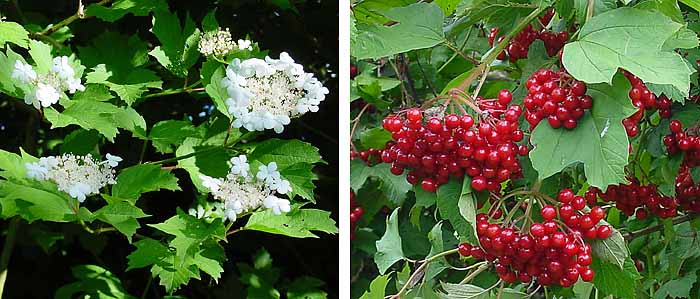
Guelder Rose (Viburnum opulus; Paprastasis putinas)

=== Flowering plant ===
(Latin: Magnoliophyta; Lithuanian: Magnolijūnai)

1. Jaundice Berry or European barberry, Ambarbaris (Latin: Berberis vulgaris; Lithuanian: Paprastasis raugerškis)
2. Betula humilis (Betula humilis; Liekninis beržas)
3. Dwarf Birch (Betula nana; Beržas keružis)
4. Common Dogwood (Cornus sanguinea; Raudonoji sedula)
5. Crataegus rhipidophylla (Crataegus rhipidophylla; Šlaitinė gudobelė)
6. Mezereon (Daphne mezereum; Paprastasis žalčialunkis)
7. Euonymus verrucosus (Euonymus verrucosus; Karpotasis ožekšnis)
8. Fly Honeysuckle or European Fly Honeysuckle, Dwarf Honeysuckle, Fly Woodbine (Lonicera xylosteum; Paprastasis sausmedis)
9. Bog Myrtle or Sweet Gale (Myrica gale; Pajūrinis sotvaras)
10. Alpine Currant (Ribes alpinum; Kalninis serbentas)
11. Blackcurrant (Ribes nigrum; Juodasis serbentas)*
12. Nordic Redcurrant or Nordic Currant, Downy Currant (Ribes spicatum; Ilgakekis serbentas)
13. Rosa caesia (Rosa caesia; Kietalapis erškėtis)
14. Dog Rose (Rosa canina; Paprastasis erškėtis)*
15. Glaucous Dog Rose (Rosa dumalis; Melsvalapis erškėtis)
16. Cinnamon Rose (Rosa majalis; Miškinis erškėtis)
17. Soft Downy Rose (Rosa mollis; Švelnialapis erškėtis)
18. Sweet Briar or Eglantine Rose (Rosa rubiginosa; Rūdėtasis erškėtis)
19. Eared Willow (Salix aurita; Ausytasis karklas)
20. Downy Willow (Salix lapponum; Laplandinis karklas)
21. Swamp Willow (Salix myrtilloides; Mėlynlapis karklas)
22. Purple Willow (Salix purpurea; Purpurinis karklas)
23. Creeping Willow (Salix repens; Gulsčiasis karklas)
24. Rosemary-Leaved Willow (Salix rosmarinifolia; Pelkinis karklas)
25. Salix starkeana (Salix starkeana; Žemasis karklas)
26. Guelder Rose or Water Elder (Viburnum opulus; Paprastasis putinas)

== Small shrubs ==
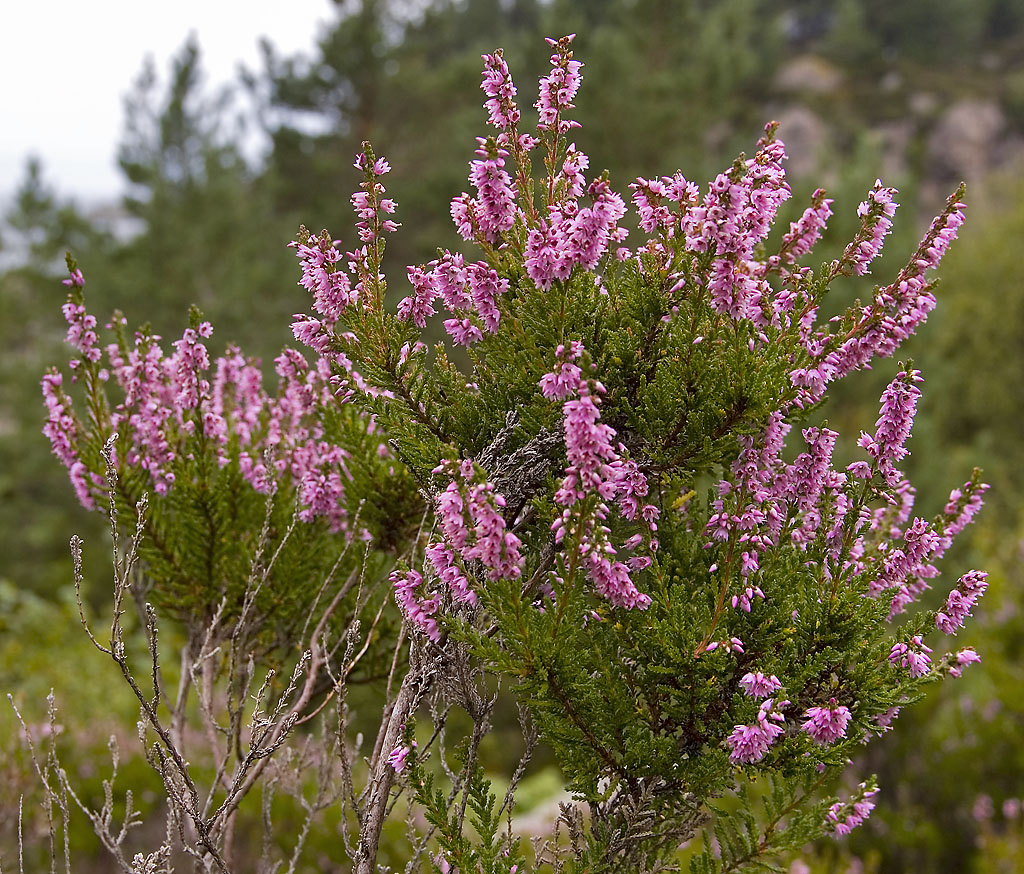
Common Heather (Calluna vulgaris; Šilinis viržis)

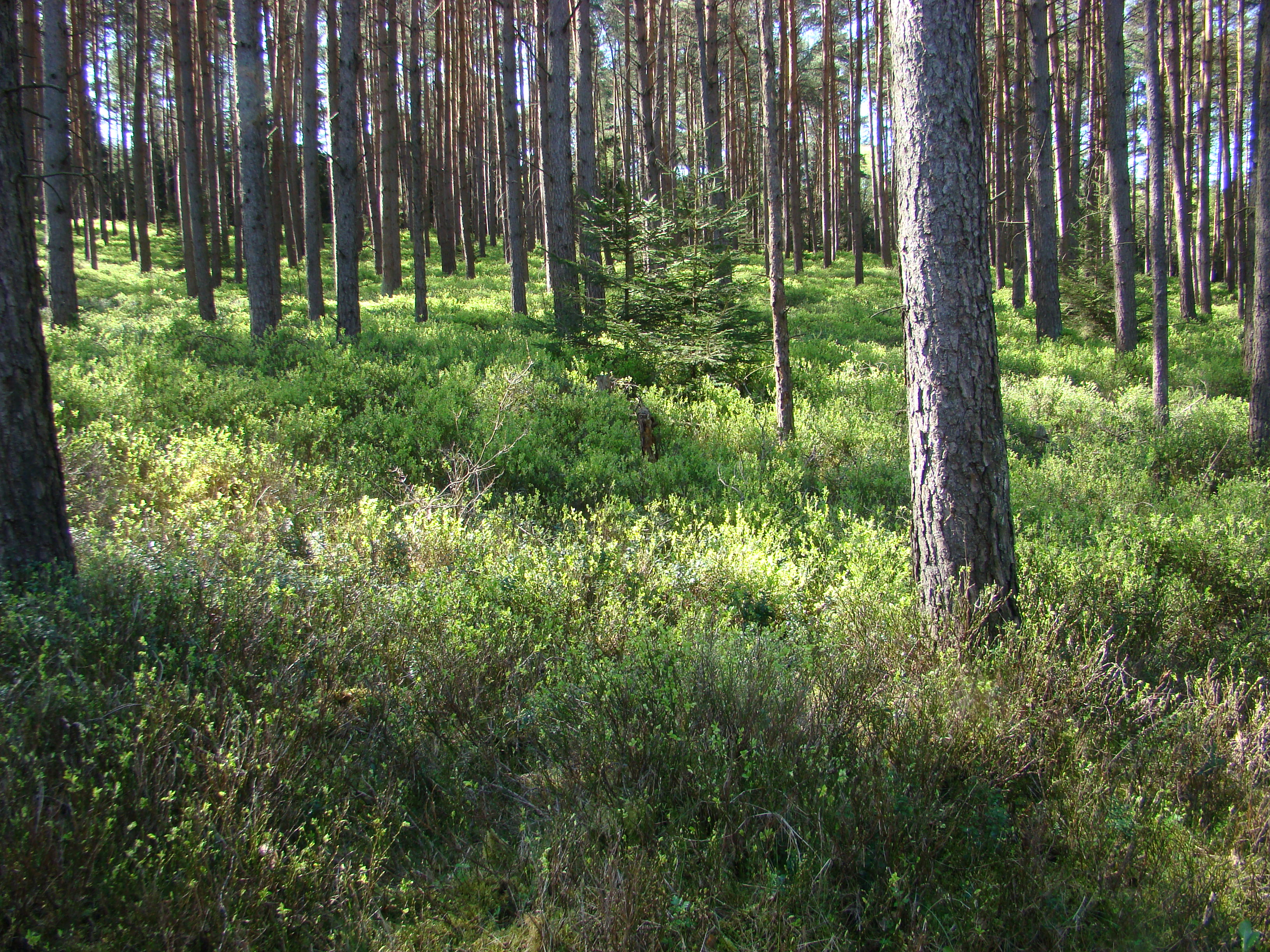
Common Bilberry (Vaccinium myrtillus; Mėlynė)

=== Flowering plant ===
(Latin: Magnoliophyta; Lithuanian: Magnolijūnai)

1. Bog Rosemary (Latin: Andromeda polifolia; Lithuanian: Siauralapė balžuva)
2. Kinnikinnick (Arctostaphylos uva-ursi; Miltinė meškauogė sin. arkliauogė, kiauluogė)
3. Common Heather or Ling, Heather (Calluna vulgaris; Šilinis viržis)*
4. Chamaedaphne calyculata (Chamaedaphne calyculata; Durpyninis bereinis)
5. Black Crowberry (Empetrum nigrum; Juodoji varnauogė)
6. Cross-Leaved Heath (Erica tetralix; Tyrulinė erika)
7. Wild Rosemary or Marsh Labrador Tea (Ledum palustre; Pelkinis gailis)
8. Small Cranberry (Vaccinium microcarpum; Smulkiauogė spanguolė)
9. Common Bilberry or Blue Whortleberry (Vaccinium myrtillus; Mėlynė)*
10. Bog cranberry or Swamp cranberry (Vaccinium oxycoccos; Paprastoji spanguolė)
11. Bog Bilberry or Northern Bilberry (Vaccinium uliginosum; Vaivoras)
12. Lingonberry or Cowberry (Vaccinium vitis-idaea; Bruknė)*

== Subshrubs ==
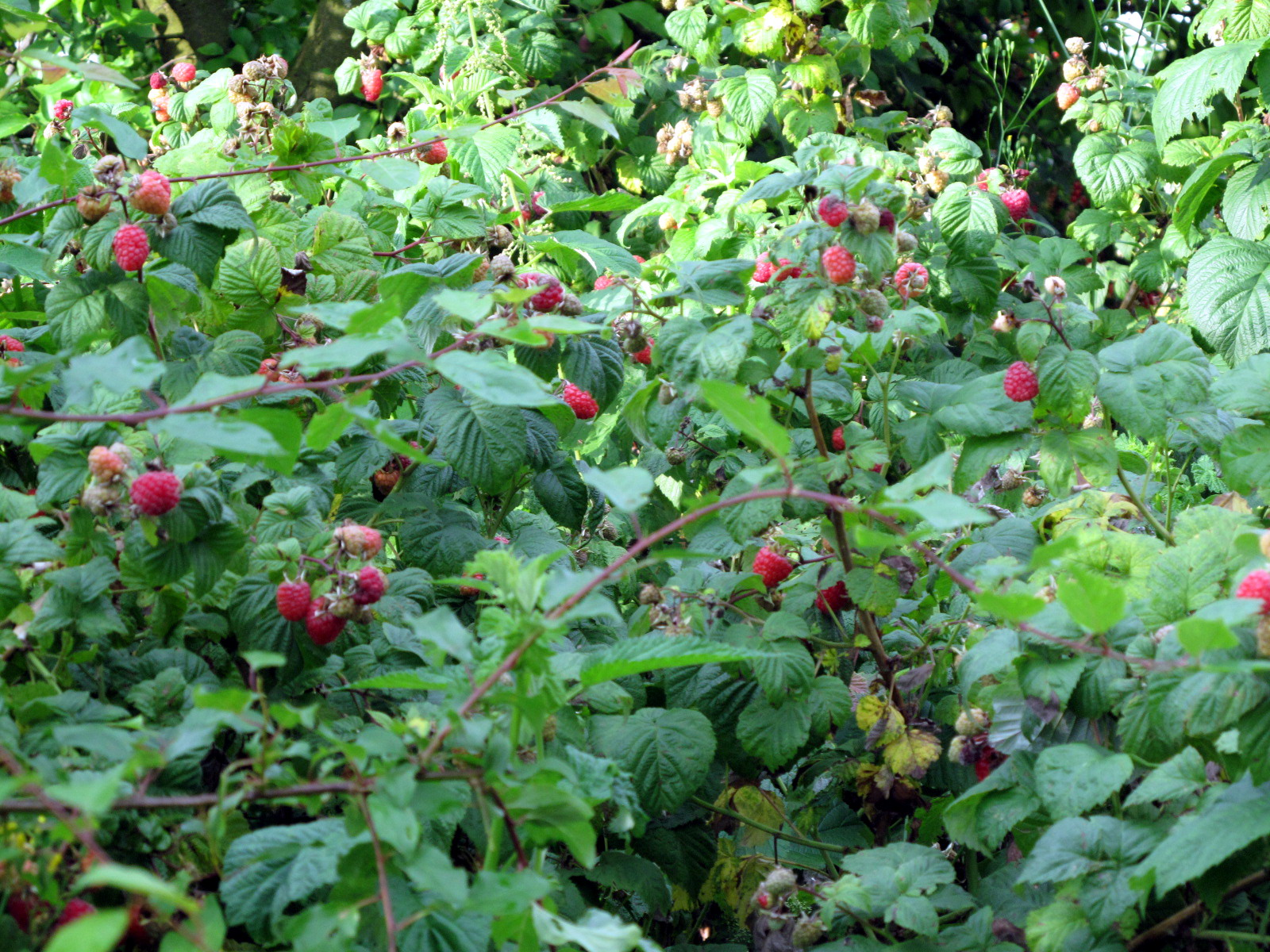
Red Raspberry (Rubus idaeus; Paprastoji avietė)

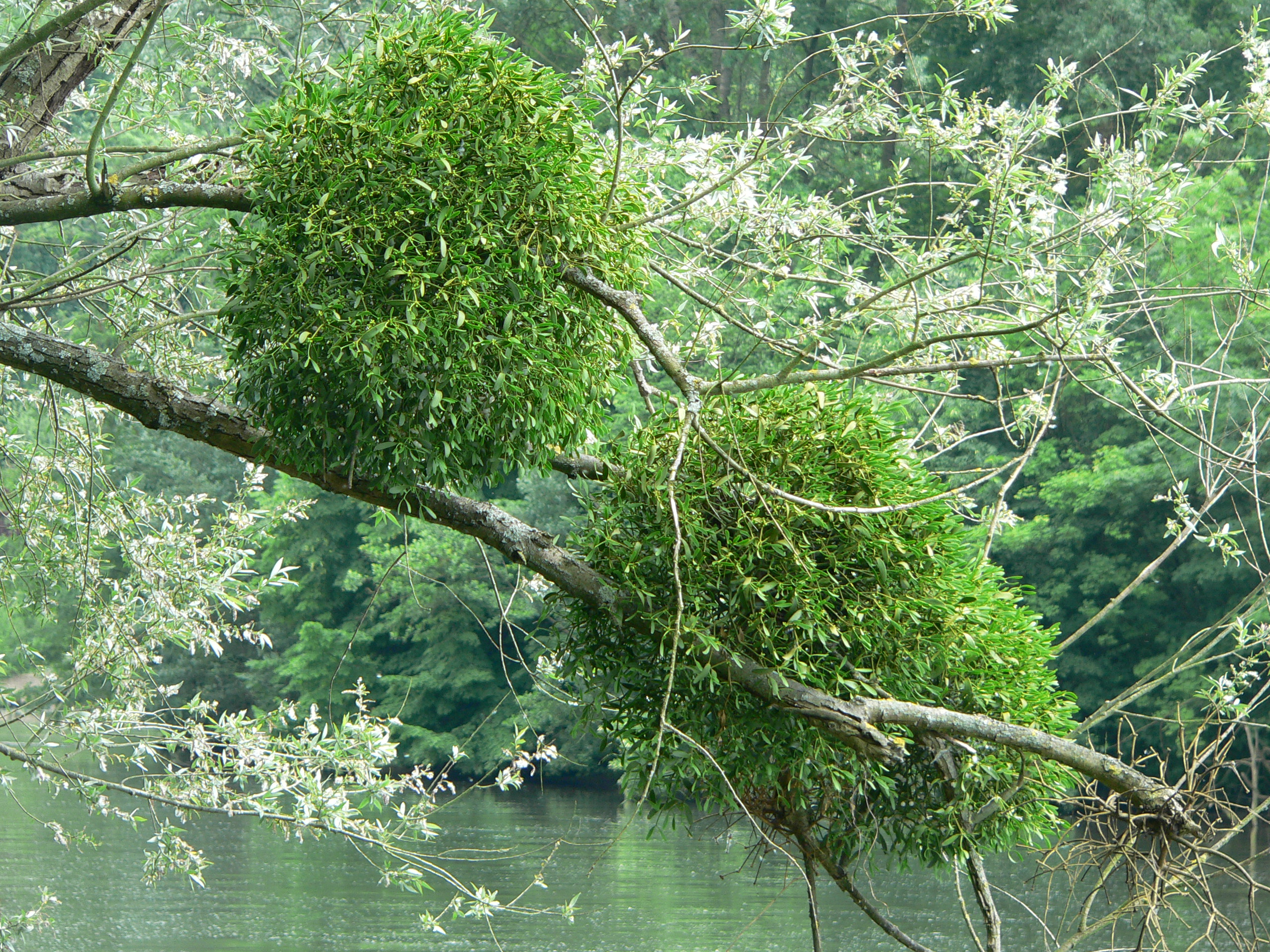
Common Mistletoe (Viscum album; Paprastasis amalas

=== Flowering plant ===
1. Arctic raspberry (Latin: Rubus arcticus; Lithuanian: Šiaurinė katuogė)
2. Rubus aureolus (Rubus aureolus; Krūmininė gervuogė)
3. European Dewberry (Rubus caesius; Paprastoji gervuogė)*
4. Knoutberry (Rubus chamaemorus; Paprastoji tekšė)
5. Common Blackberry (Rubus fruticosus; Raukšlėtoji gervuogė)
6. Red Raspberry or European Raspberry (Rubus idaeus; Paprastoji avietė)*
7. Rubus nessensis (Rubus nessensis; Stačioji gervuogė)
8. Stone Bramble (Rubus saxatilis; Paprastoji katuogė)
9. Rubus scissus (Rubus scissus; Septynlapė gervuogė)
10. Rubus wahlbergii (Rubus wahlbergii; Lazdynlapė gervuogė)
11. Bittersweet (Solanum dulcamara; Karklavijas)
12. Lemon Thyme (Thymus pulegioides; Keturbriaunis čiobrelis)
13. Breckland Thyme (Thymus serpyllum; Paprastasis čiobrelis)
14. Common Mistletoe or European Mistletoe (Viscum album; Paprastasis amalas or Laumės šluota)

== Liana ==
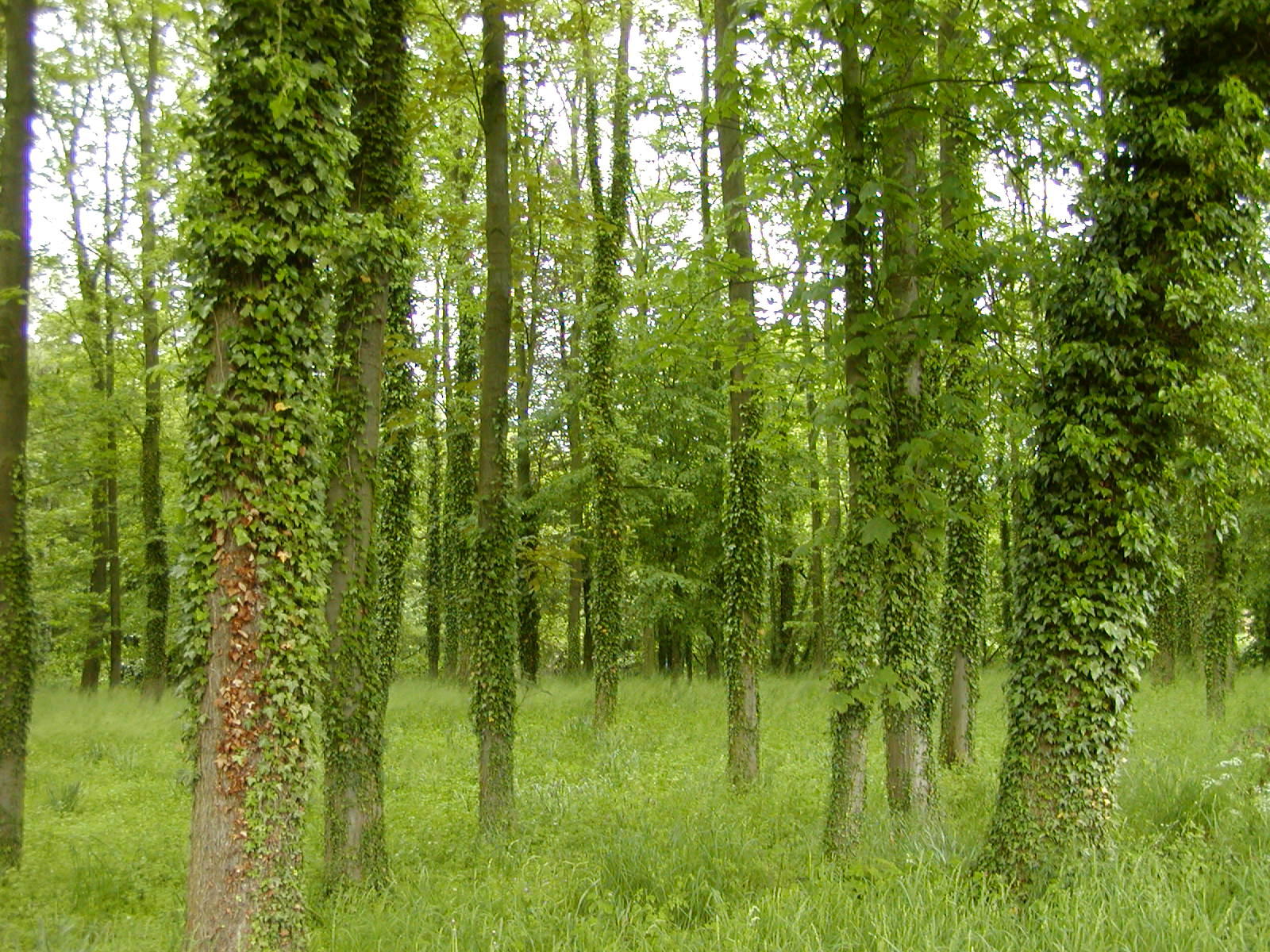
English Ivy (Hedera helix; Gebenė lipikė)

=== Flowering plant ===
1. English Ivy or Common Ivy (Latin: Hedera helix; Lithuanian: Gebenė lipikė)

== See also ==
- Ancient Woodland
- Clearcutting
- Deforestation
- Dendrology
- Dendrometry
- Flora of Lithuania
- Forest
- Illegal logging
- Intact forest landscape
- Invasive species
- List of old-growth forests
- List of superlative trees
- List of tree genera
- List of trees and shrubs by taxonomic family
- Old-growth forest
- Plant
- Reforestation
- Trees
- Trees of the world
