= List of Minnesota trees by family =

This is a list of all the coniferous and broadleaf trees native to Minnesota by family.

== Coniferous trees ==
- Cupressaceae (cypress family)
  - Juniperus virginiana (eastern juniper or red cedar)
  - Thuja occidentalis (eastern arborvitae or white cedar)
- Pinaceae (pine family)
  - Abies balsamea (balsam fir)
  - Larix laricina (tamarack larch)
  - Pinus banksiana (jack pine)
  - Pinus strobus (eastern white pine)
  - Pinus resinosa (red pine or Norway pine)
  - Picea glauca (white spruce)
  - Picea mariana (black spruce)
  - Tsuga canadensis (eastern hemlock)

== Broadleaf trees ==
- Betulaceae (birch family)
  - Betula alleghaniensis (yellow birch)
  - Betula nigra (river birch)
  - Betula papyrifera (paper birch)
  - Carpinus caroliniana (American hornbeam, blue beech, ironwood)
  - Ostrya virginiana (ironwood, hophornbeam)
- Fabaceae (pea family)
  - Gleditsia triacanthos (honey locust)
  - Gymnocladus dioicus (Kentucky coffeetree)
- Fagaceae (beech family)
  - Quercus alba (white oak)
  - Quercus bicolor (swamp white oak)
  - Quercus ellipsoidalis (northern pin oak)
  - Quercus macrocarpa (bur oak)
  - Quercus muehlenbergii (chinkapin oak)
  - Quercus rubra (northern red oak)
  - Quercus velutina (black oak)
- Juglandaceae (walnut family)
  - Carya cordiformis (bitternut hickory)
  - Carya ovata (shagbark hickory)
  - Juglans cinerea (butternut)
  - Juglans nigra (black walnut)
- Malvaceae (mallow family)
  - Tilia americana (basswood)
- Moraceae (mulberry family)
  - Morus rubra (red mulberry)
- Oleaceae (olive family)
  - Fraxinus americana (white ash)
  - Fraxinus nigra (black ash)
  - Fraxinus pennsylvanica (green ash and red ash)
- Rosaceae (rose family)
  - Amelanchier arborea (downy serviceberry)
  - Crataegus macracantha (large-thorned hawthorn)
  - Crataegus mollis (downy hawthorn)
  - Crataegus punctata (dotted hawthorn)
  - Malus ioensis (Prairie Crabapple)
  - Prunus americana (wild plum)
  - Prunus nigra (Canada Plum)
  - Prunus pensylvanica (pin cherry)
  - Prunus serotina (black cherry)
  - Prunus virginiana (chockcherry)
  - Sorbus americana (American mountain ash)
  - Sorbus decora (showy mountain-ash)
- Salicaceae (willow family)
  - Populus tremuloides (quaking aspen)
  - Populus grandidentata (big-tooth aspen)
  - Populus balsamifera (balsam poplar)
  - Populus deltoides (eastern cottonwood)
  - Salix nigra (black willow)
  - Salix amygdaloides (peachleaf willow)
- Sapindaceae (soapberry family)
  - Acer negundo (boxelder)
  - Acer nigrum (black maple)
  - Acer rubrum (red maple)
  - Acer saccharinum (silver maple)
  - Acer saccharum (sugar maple)
  - Acer spicatum (mountain maple)
- Ulmaceae (elm family)
  - Celtis occidentalis (hackberry)
  - Ulmus americana (American elm)
  - Ulmus rubra (slippery elm)
  - Ulmus thomasii (rock elm)

== Introduced and invasive species ==
Introduced and invasive species of trees include:

- Eleagnaceae (Oleaster)
  - Elaeagnus angustifolia (Russian olive)
- Fabaceae
  - Robinia pseudoacacia (black locust)
- Hippocastanaceae (buckeye and horsechestnut)
  - Aesculus glabra (Ohio buckeye)
  - Aesculus hippocastanum (European horsechestnut)
- Pinaceae (Pine)
  - Picea abies (Norway spruce)
  - Larix decidua (European larch)
  - Picea pungens (Colorado blue spruce)
  - Pinus rigida (pitch pine)
  - Pinus sylvestris (Scots pine)
- Rhamnaceae (Buckthorns)
  - Frangula alnus (glossy buckthorn, alder buckthorn)
  - Rhamnus cathartica (common buckthorn)
- Salicaceae (willow)
  - Populus alba (white poplar)
- Sapindaceae (Soapberry family)
  - Acer ginnala (Amur maple)
  - Acer platanoides (Norway maple)
- Ulmaceae (Elm)
  - Ulmus glabra (Wych elm)
  - Ulmus pumila (Siberian elm)
