= Trees of Pakistan =

Tree species of the country Pakistan

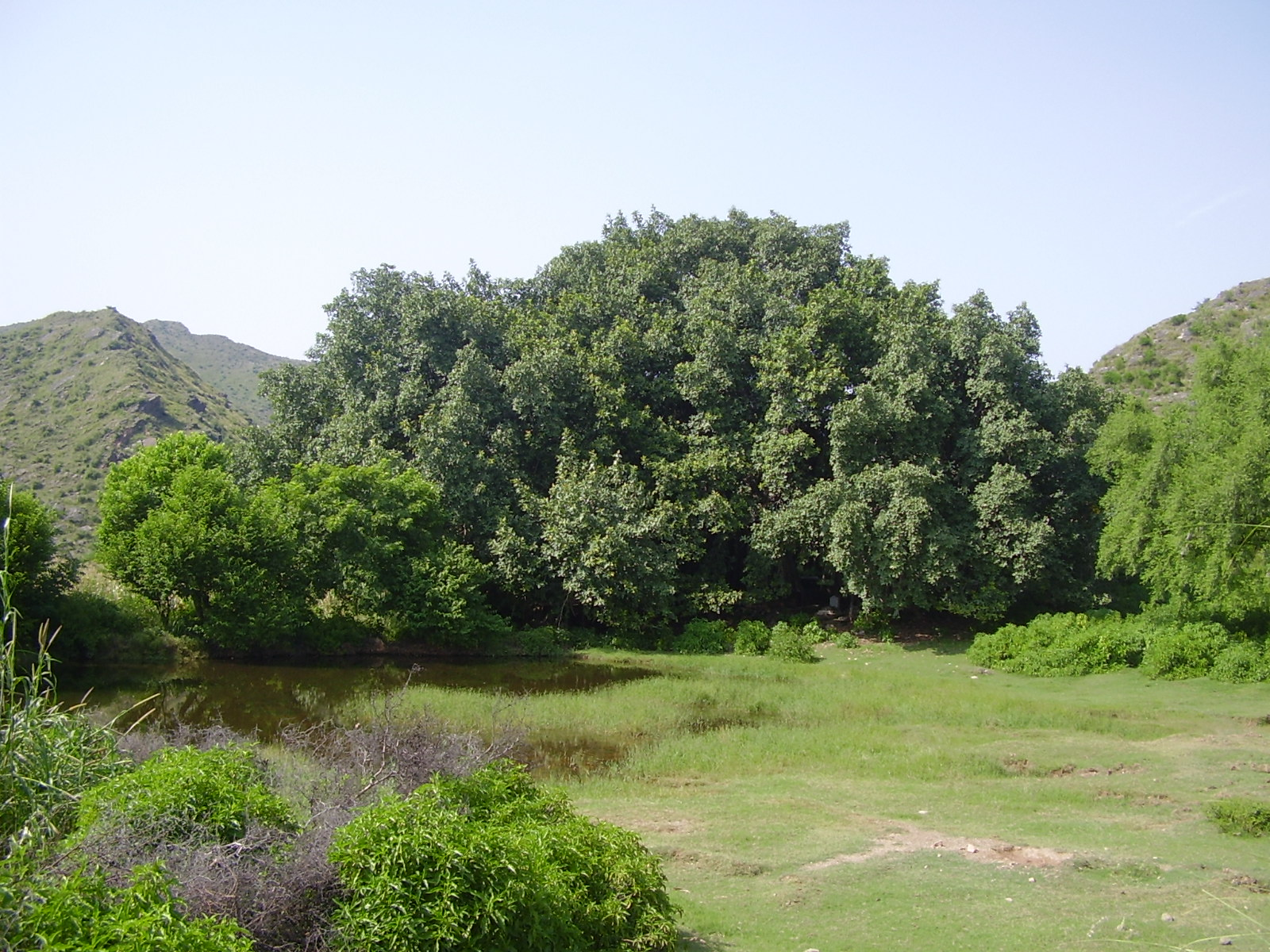
Old banyan tree in Pharwala Fort.

In Pakistan, more than 430 tree species are distributed over 82 families and 226 genera. Out of these, 22 species from 5 families and 11 genera belong to softwood trees of gymnosperms. For all plant families found in Pakistan, see Flora of Pakistan.

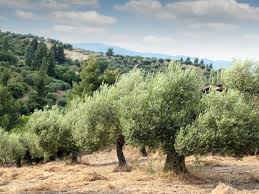
Olive trees in Pakistan

The Deodar Tree is the official national tree of Pakistan. Its name is derived from 'Sanskrit' and means "Wood of the God". It is amongst the tallest trees in the country, reaching heights of around 40-50 meters, with trunks up to 3 meters in diameter.

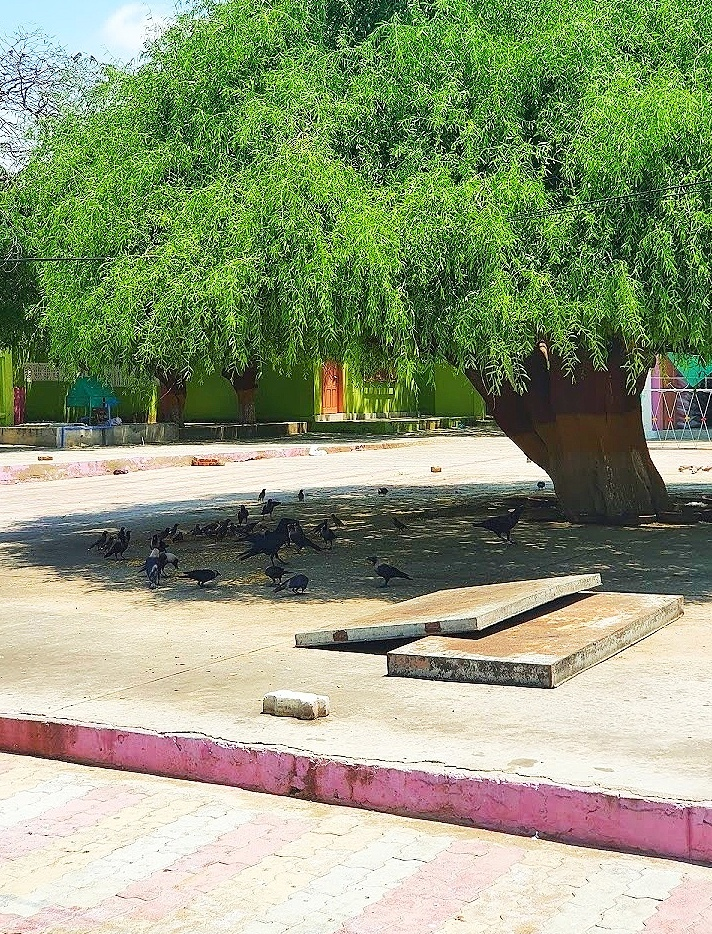
Neem tree at Sant Nenuram Ashram

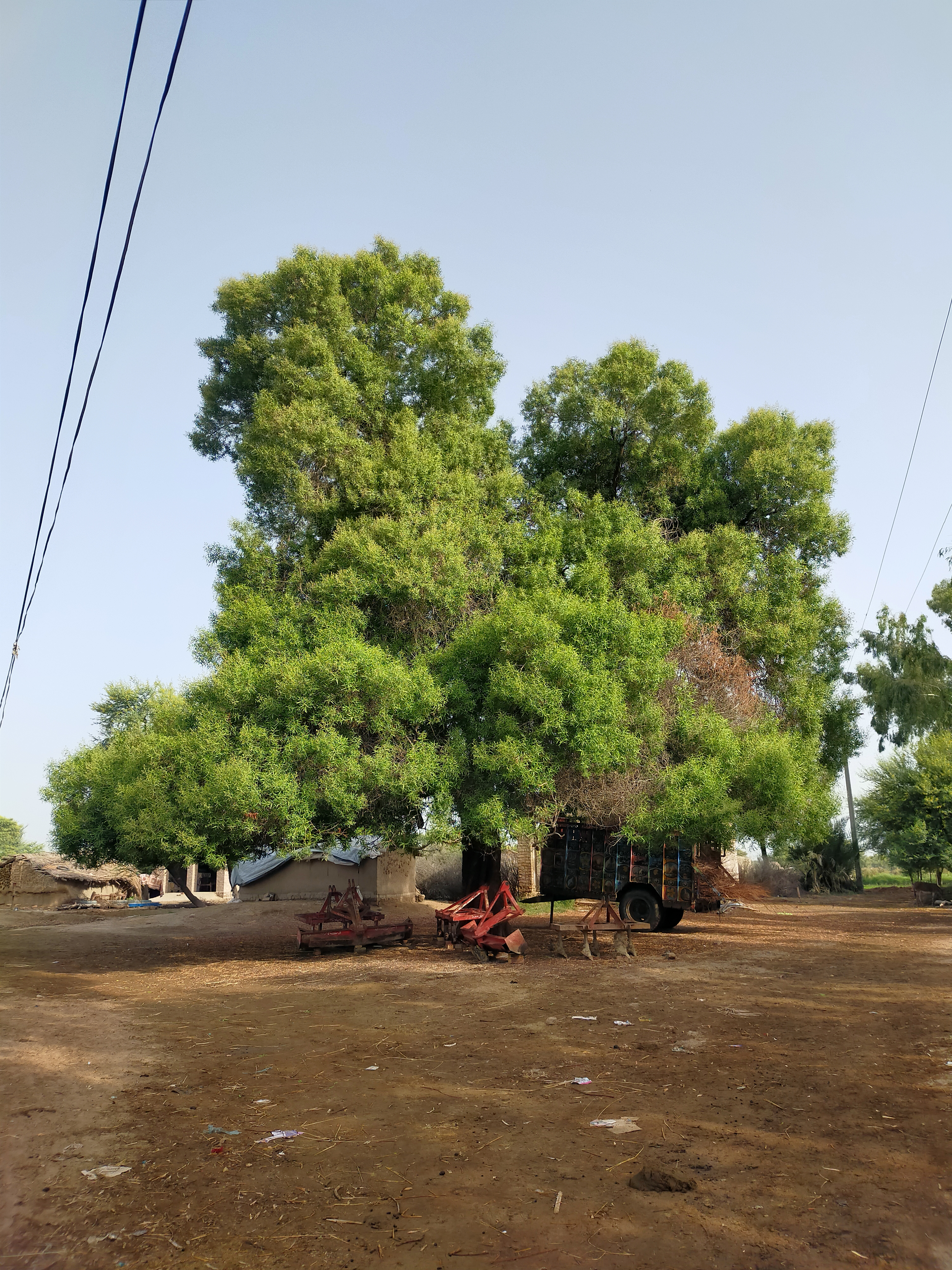
Large, ancient Tree in village Dil Sher Brohi, Sindh

== Examples ==
Order	Family	Species	Local name(s)
Brassicales	Capparaceae	Capparis decidua	Kair, Karir
Brassicales	Salvadoraceae	Salvadora oleoides	Vann
Fabales	Fabaceae	Acacia catechu	Catechu
Fabales	Fabaceae	Acacia modesta	Phulai
Fabales	Fabaceae	Acacia nilotica	Babul
Fabales	Fabaceae	Dalbergia sissoo	Sheesham
Fabales	Fabaceae	Prosopis cineraria	Jand (Punjabi), Kandi (Sindhi)
Lamiales	Acanthaceae	Avicennia marina	White mangrove
Malpighiales	Salicaceae	Populus euphratica	Populus
Pinales	Cupressaceae	Juniperus recurva	Drooping juniper
Pinales	Pinaceae	Abies pindrow	Pindrow fir
Pinales	Pinaceae	Cedrus deodara	Deodar
Pinales	Pinaceae	Picea smithiana	Morinda spruce
Pinales	Pinaceae	Pinus gerardiana	Chilgoza
Pinales	Pinaceae	Pinus roxburghii	Chir Pine
Pinales	Pinaceae	Pinus wallichiana	Blue pine, kail
Proteales	Platanaceae	Platanus orientalis (introduced)	Chenar, Chinar
Rosales	Moraceae	Ficus religiosa	Peepul
Rosales	Moraceae	Ficus benghalensis	Banyan
Rosales	Moraceae	Ficus racemosa	
Rosales	Moraceae	Ficus auriculata	
Rosales	Moraceae	Morus alba	White mulberry
Malvales	Malvaceae	Bombax ceiba	Silk cotton, sumbul
Malpighiales	Phyllanthaceae	Phyllanthus emblica	Amla
Sapindales	Meliaceae	Azadirachta indica	Neem

== See also ==
- Ecoregions of Pakistan
- Wildflowers of Pakistan
- Wildlife of Pakistan
- Forestry in Pakistan
- Midh Ranjha Tree
