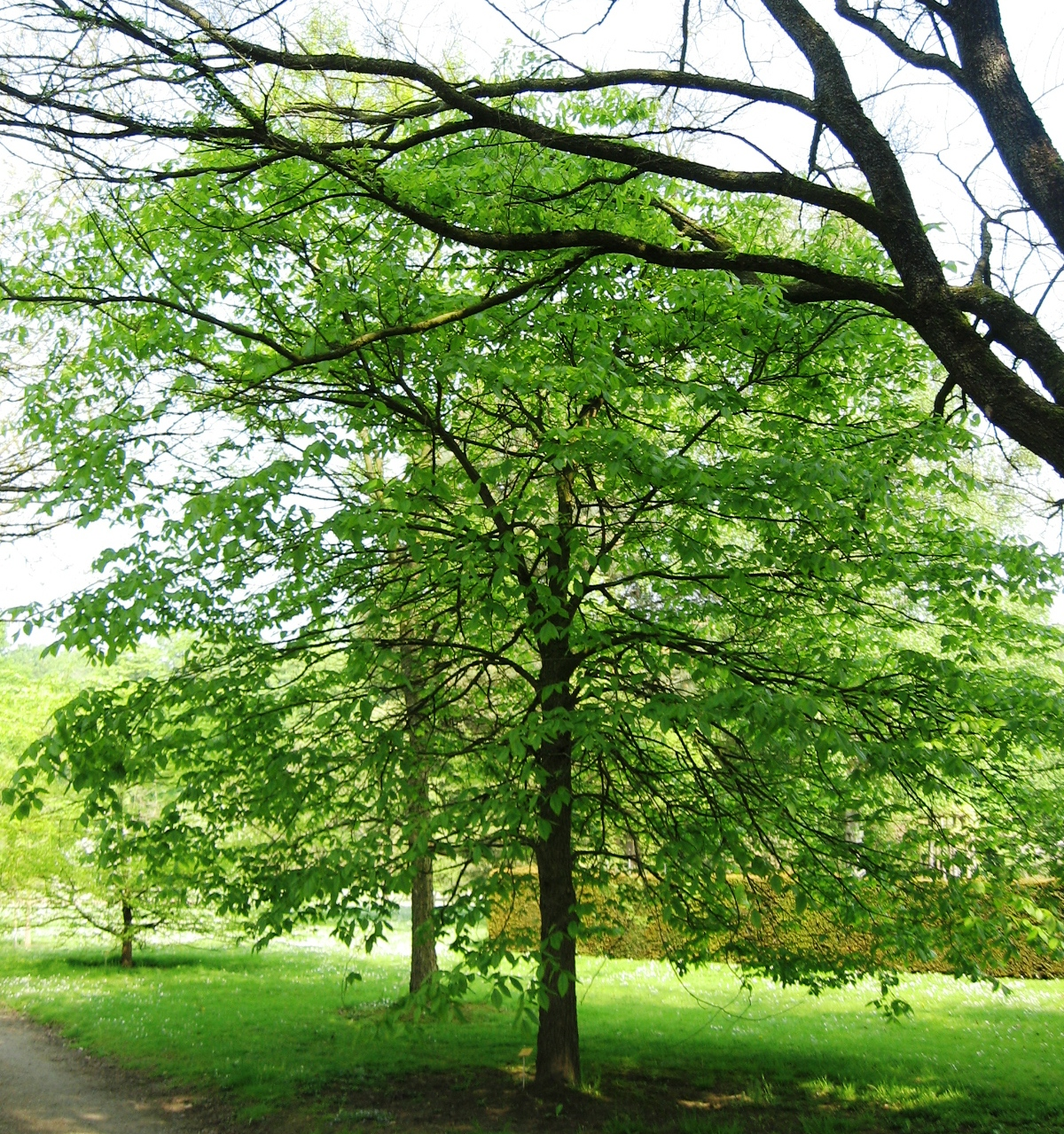
- Rock elm, Meise.

Conservation status
- Least Concern (IUCN 3.1)

- Apparently Secure (NatureServe)

Scientific classification
- Kingdom: Plantae
- Clade: Tracheophytes
- Clade: Angiosperms
- Clade: Eudicots
- Clade: Rosids
- Order: Rosales
- Family: Ulmaceae
- Genus: Ulmus
- Subgenus: U. subg. Oreoptelea
- Section: U. sect. Chaetoptelea
- Species: U. thomasii

Binomial name
- Ulmus thomasii Sarg.
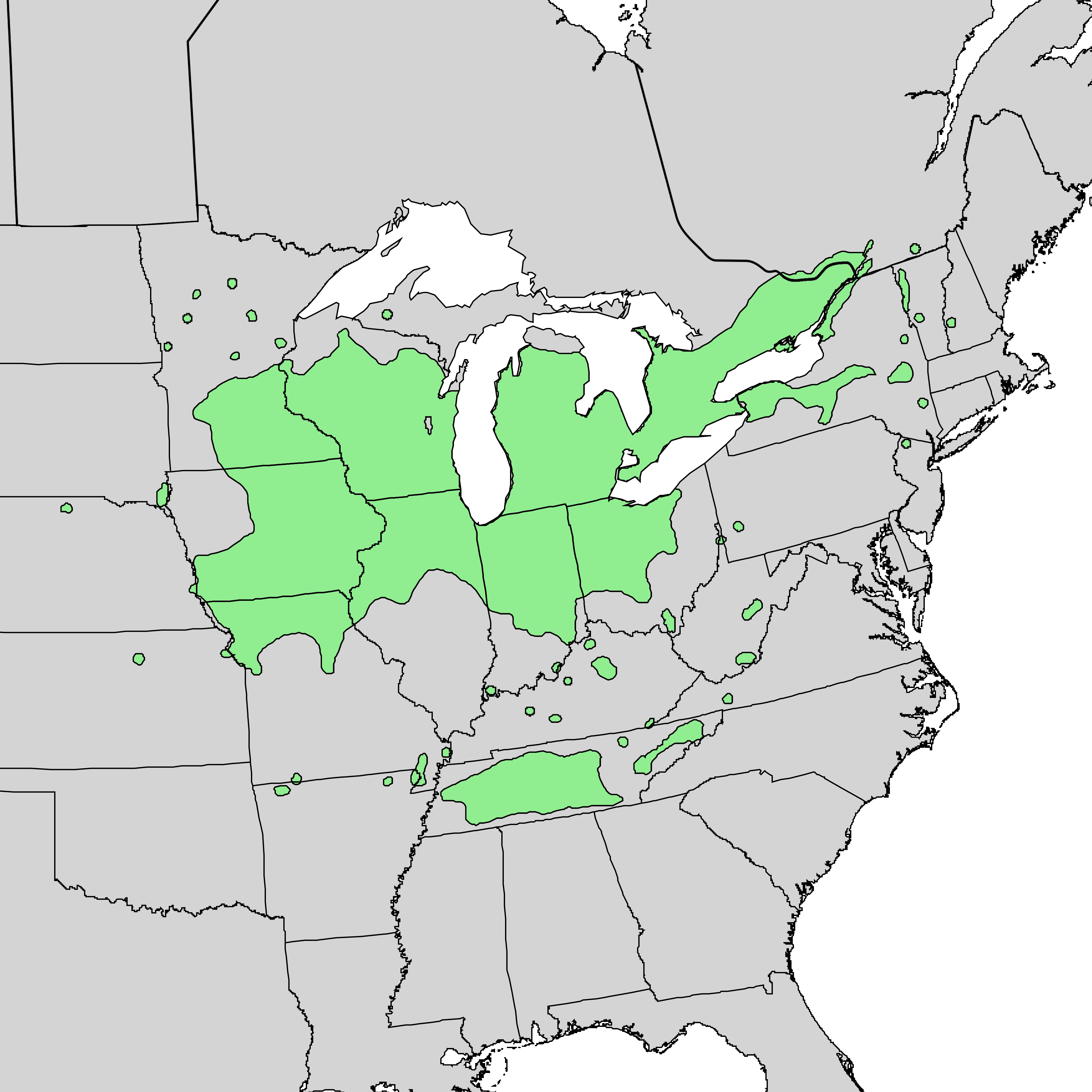
- Natural range of Ulmus thomasii

Synonyms
- Ulmus racemosa Thomas

= Ulmus thomasii =

Rock elm

Species of tree

Ulmus thomasii, the rock elm or cork elm (or orme liège in Québec), is a deciduous tree native primarily to the Midwestern United States. The tree ranges from southern Ontario and Quebec, south to Tennessee, west to northeastern Kansas, and north to Minnesota.

== Etymology ==
The tree was named in 1902 for David Thomas, an American civil engineer who had first named and described the tree in 1831 as Ulmus racemosa.

== Description ==
Ulmus thomasii grows as a tree from 15–30 m (50–100 ft) tall, and may live for up to 300 years. Where forest-grown, the crown is cylindrical and upright with short branches, and is narrower than most other elms. Rock elm is also unusual among North American elms in that it is often monopodial. The bark is grey-brown and deeply furrowed into scaly, flattened ridges. Many older branches have 3–4 irregular thick corky wings. It is for this reason the rock elm is sometimes called the cork elm.

The leaves are 5–10 cm (2–4 in) long and 2–5 cm (3/4–2 in) wide, oval to obovate with a round, symmetrical base and acuminate apex. The leaf surface is shiny dark green, turning bright yellow in autumn; the underside is pubescent. The perfect apetalous, wind-pollinated flowers are red-green and appear in racemes up to 40 mm (2 in) long two weeks before the leaves from March to May, depending on the tree's location. The fruit is a broad ovate samara 13–25 mm (1/2–31/32 in) long covered with fine hair, notched at the tip, and maturing during May or June to form drooping clusters at the leaf bases.

Although U. thomasii is protandrous, levels of self-pollination remain high.

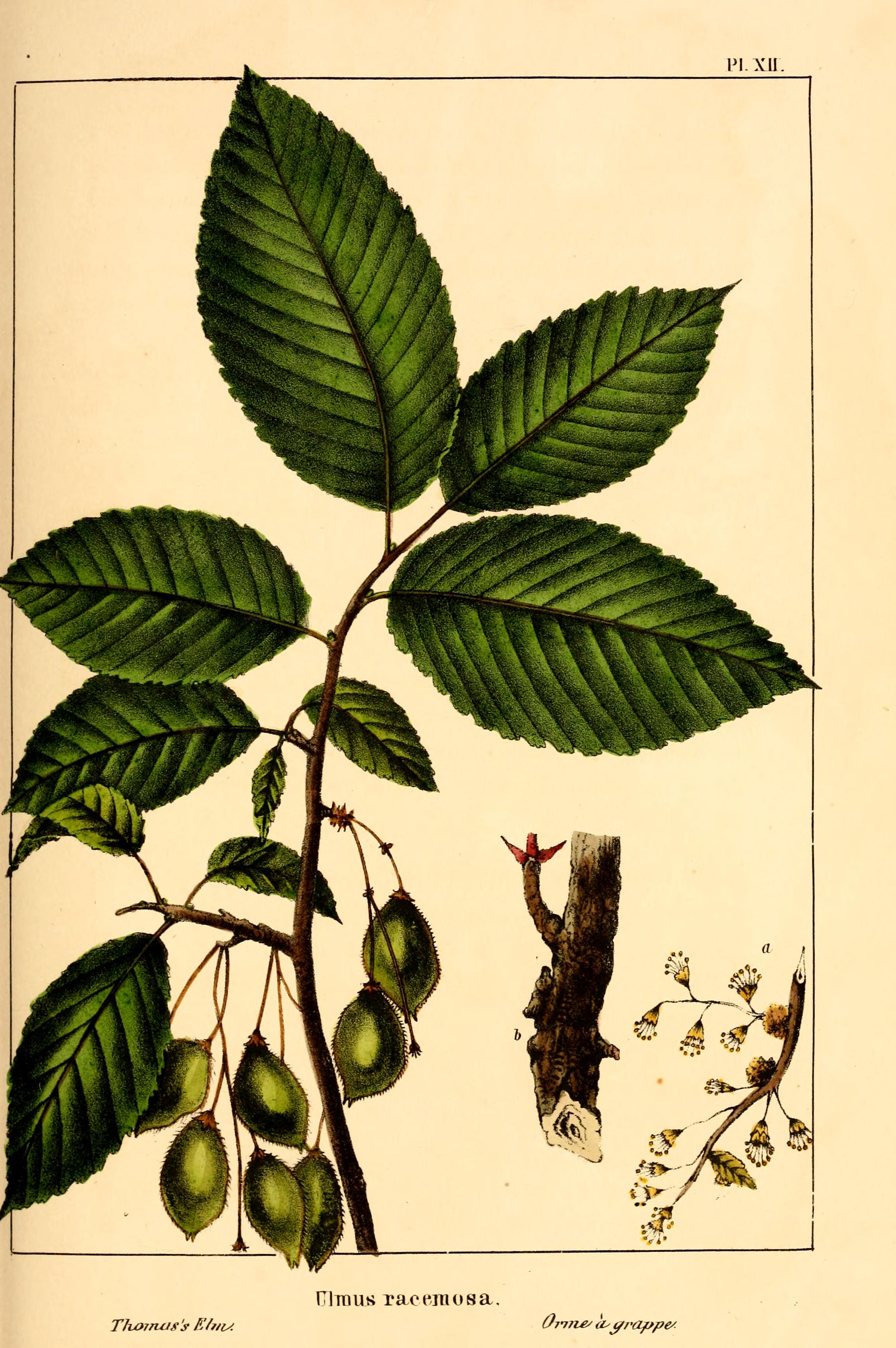
U. racemosa [:U. thomasii] diagnostic illustration (1865)

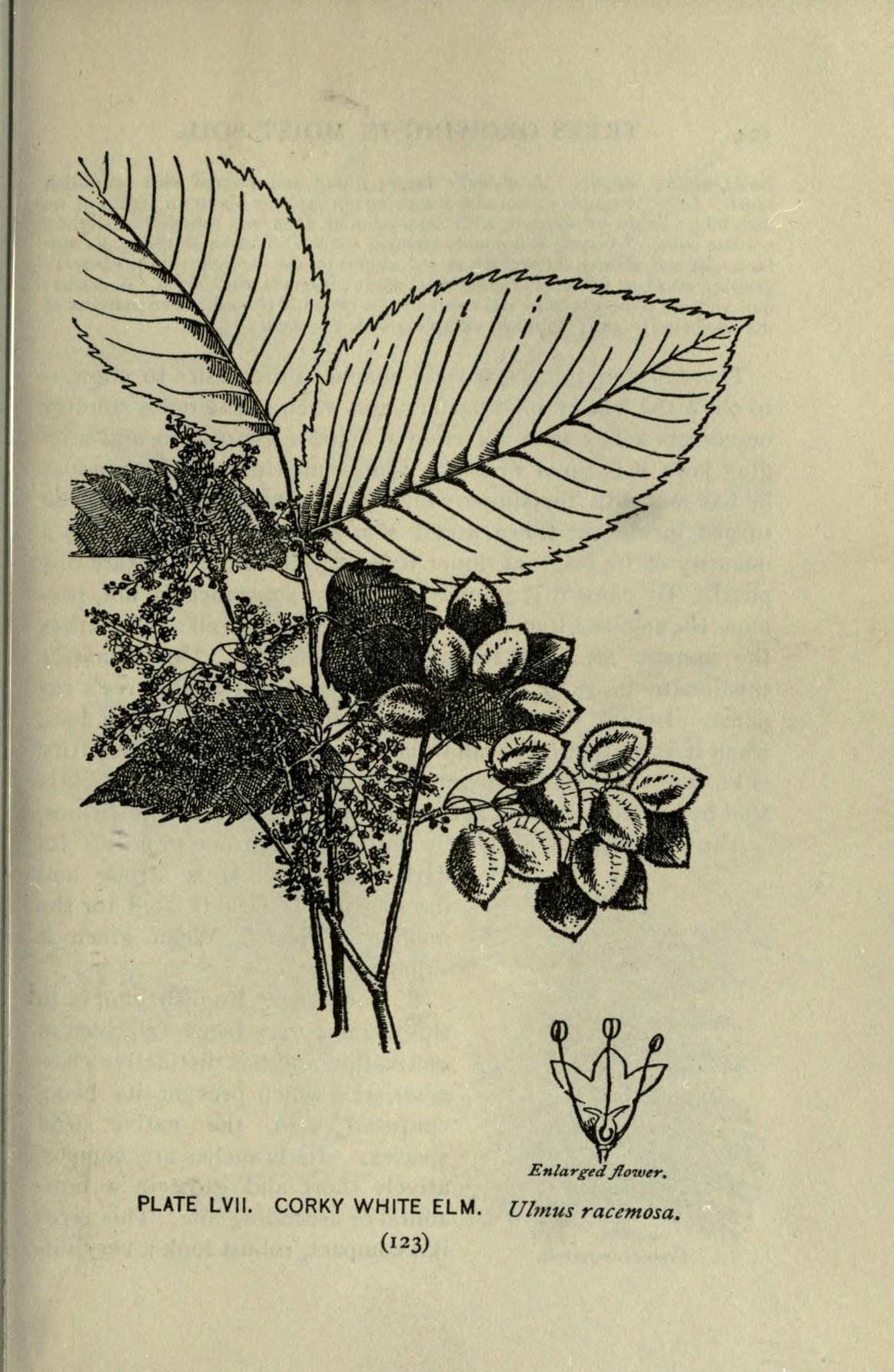
U. racemosa [:U. thomasii] diagnostic illustration (1900)

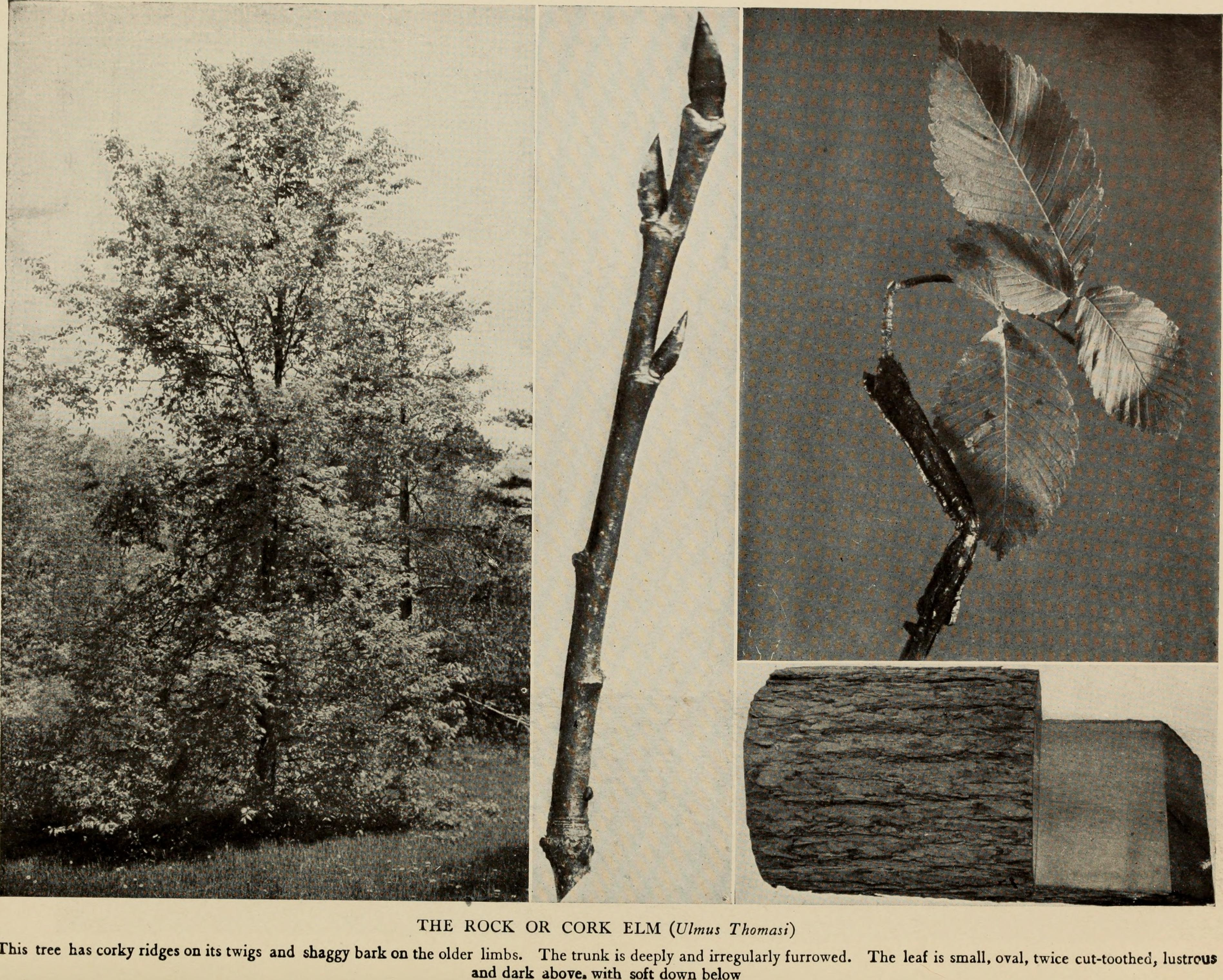
U. thomasii shoot and buds (1920)

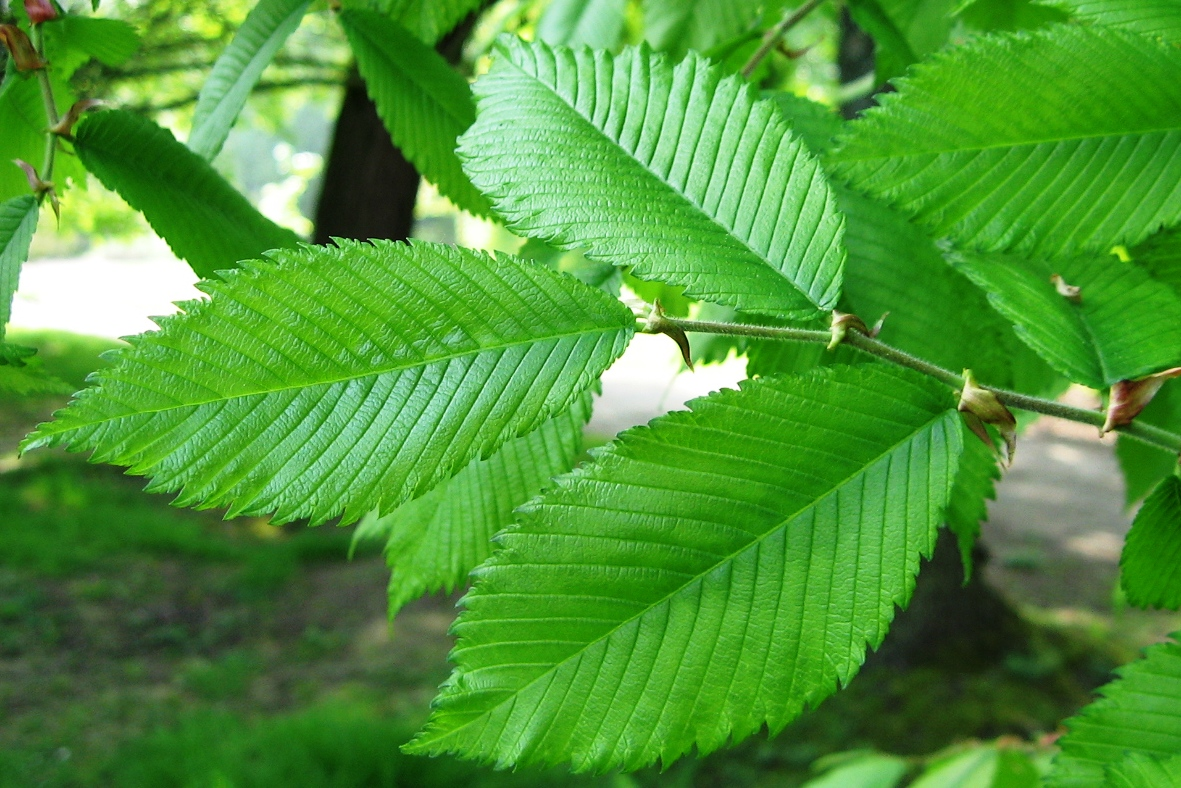
U. thomasii new leaves, Meisse

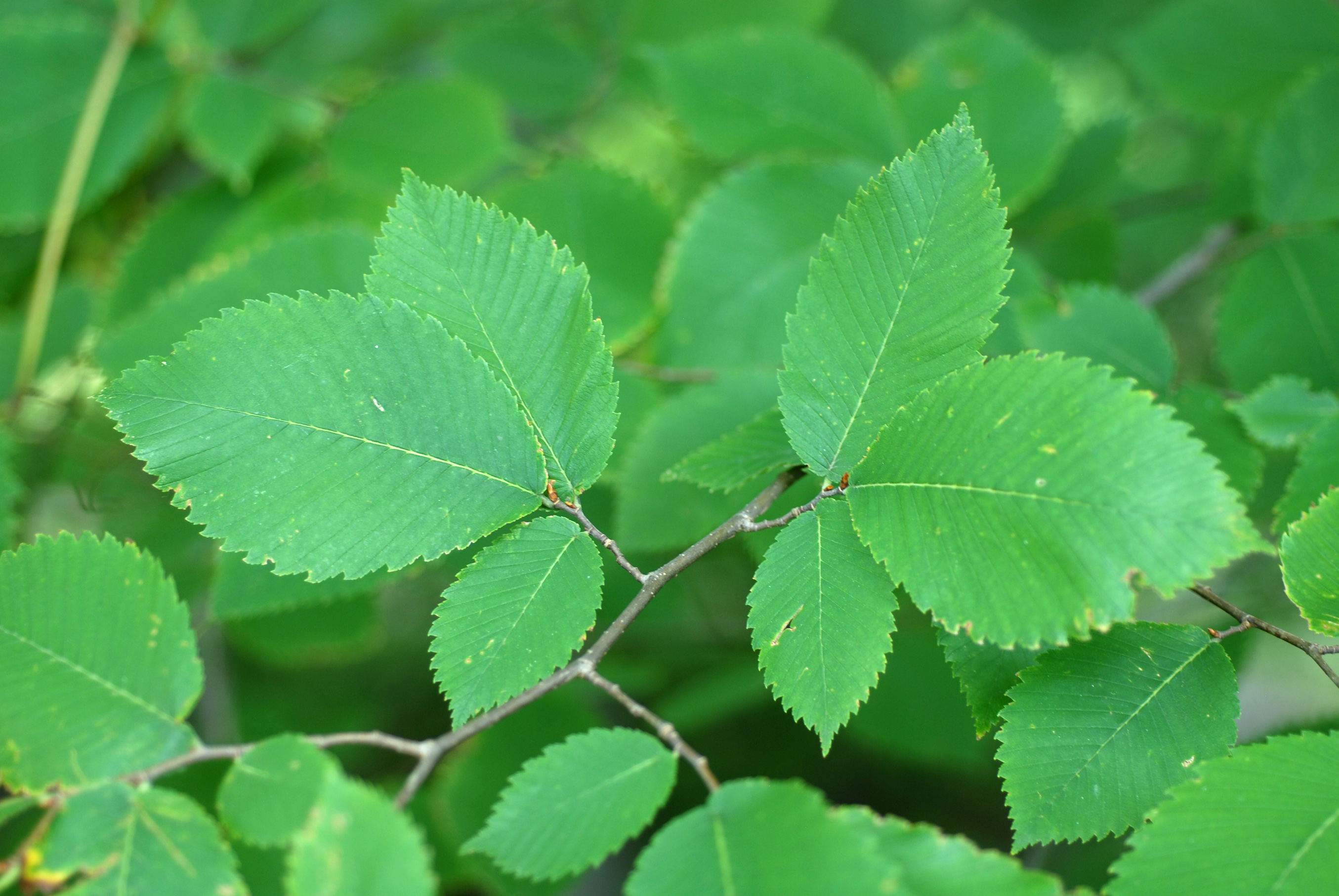
U. thomasii August leaves on short shoot, Jamesville, New York

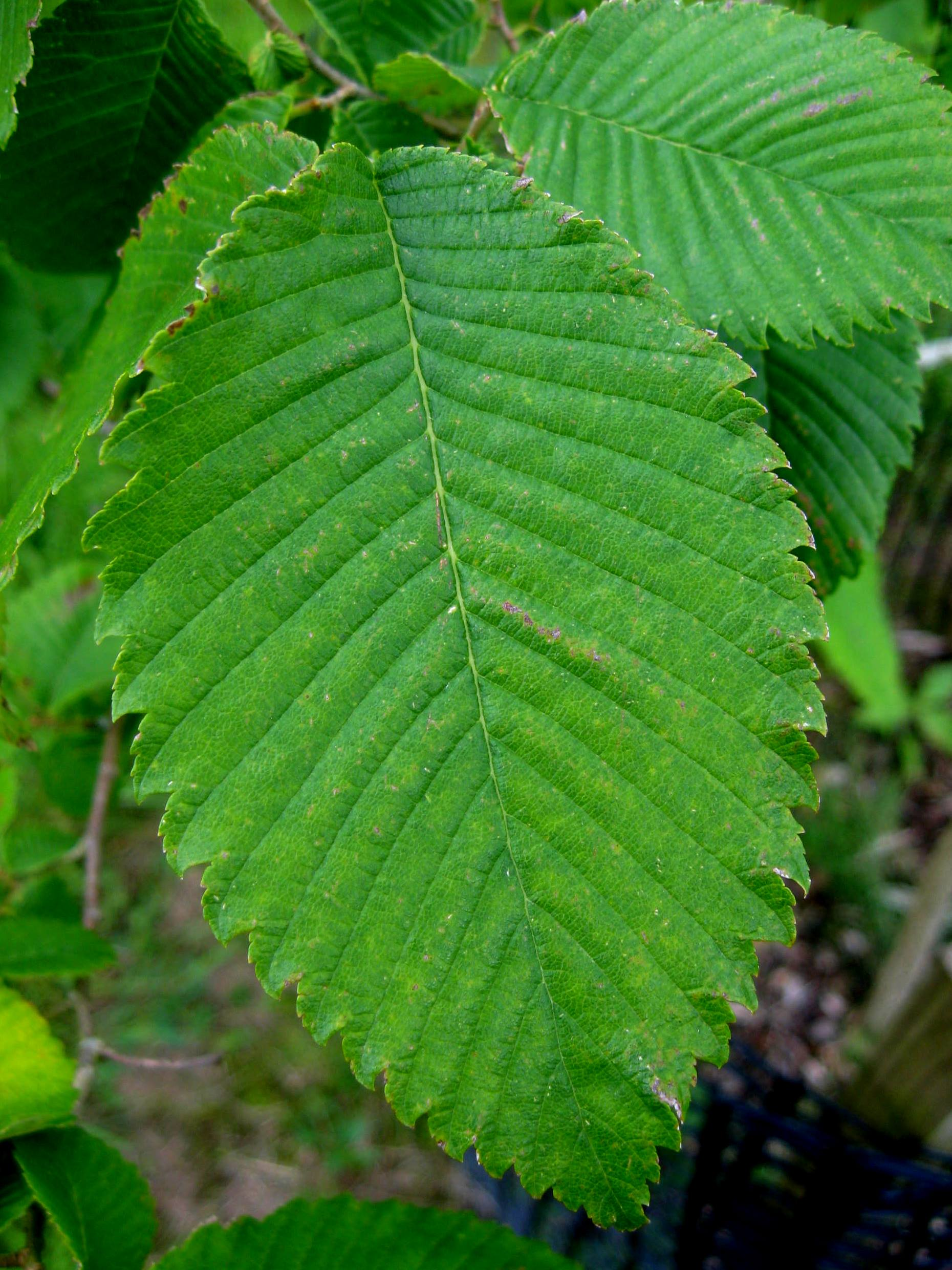
U. thomasii leaves, Sir Harold Hillier Gardens, England

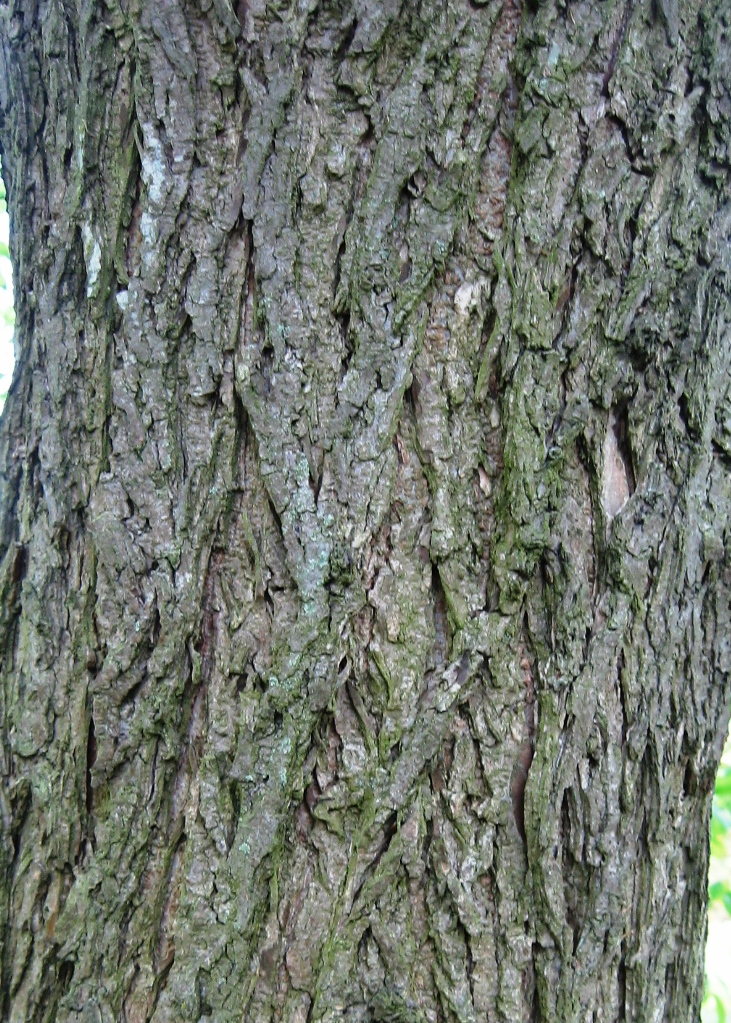
U. thomasii bark, Meisse

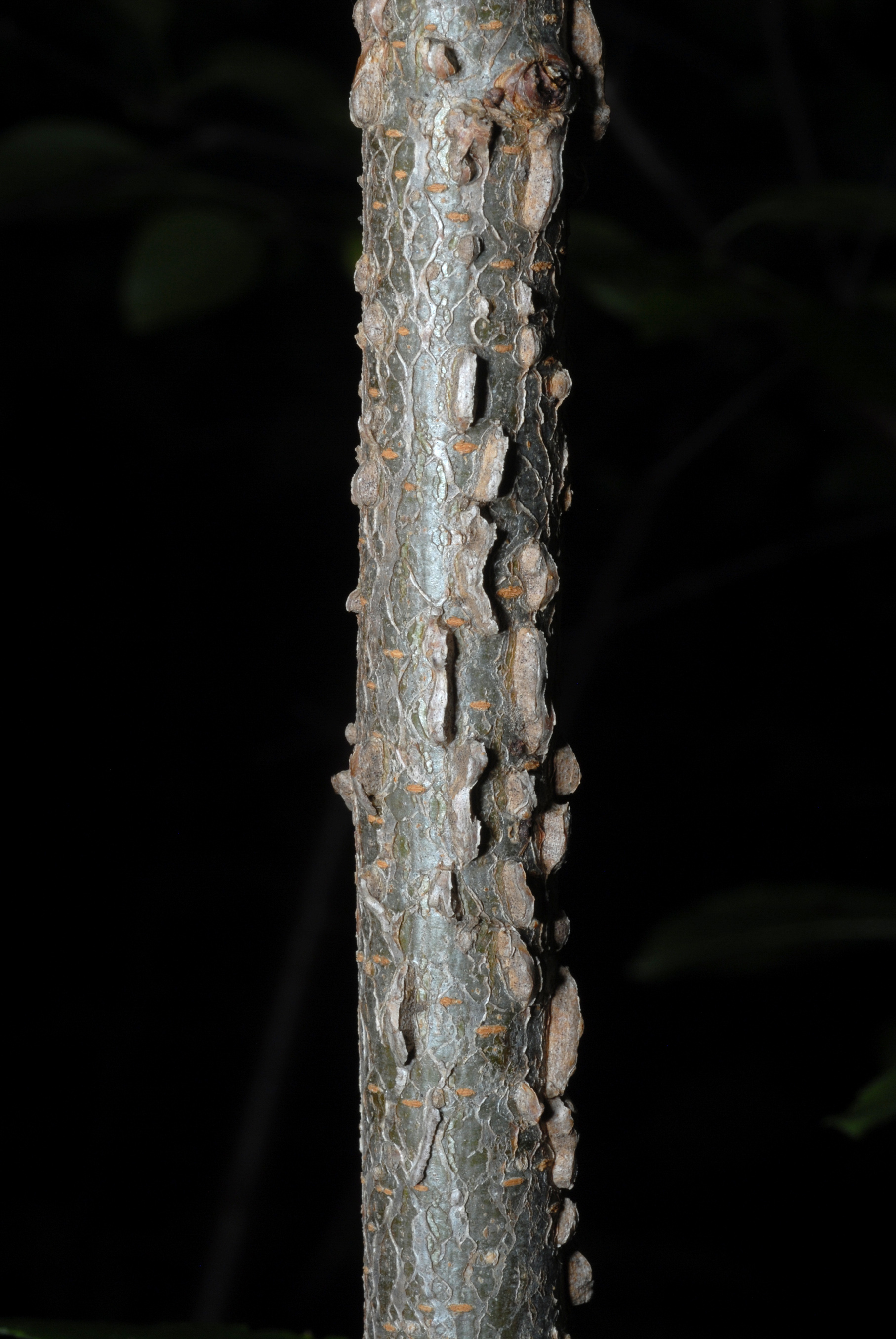
U. thomasii young bark

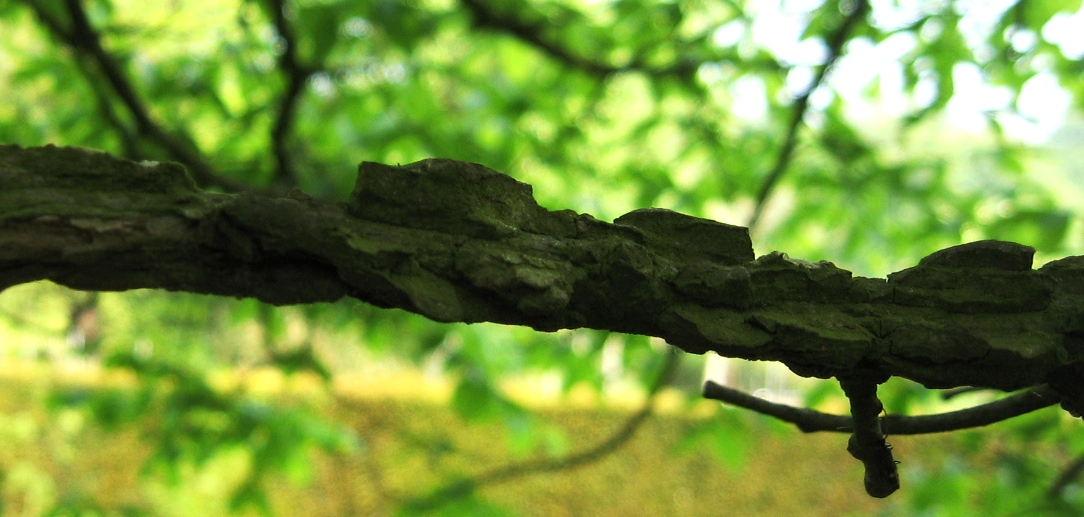
U. thomasii corky twig, Meisse

== Ecology ==
Ulmus thomasii is moderately shade-tolerant. Its preferred habitat is moist but well-drained sandy loam, loam, or silt loam soil, mixed with other hardwoods. However, it also grows on dry uplands, especially on rocky ridges and limestone bluffs.

== Pests and diseases ==
Like most North American elms, U. thomasii is very susceptible to Dutch elm disease.

== Cultivation ==
There are no known cultivars of Ulmus thomasii, nor is it known to be any longer in commerce. It appeared in some US nursery catalogues in the early 20th century. It has, however, been planted as a street tree in Cheyenne, Wyoming, where in tight lines it keeps a monopodial habit recalling Jersey elm. The species is occasionally grown beyond its native range as a specimen tree in botanical gardens and arboreta, for example in northwestern Europe, but not commonly cultivated in northern Europe, being unsuited to the region's more temperate, maritime climate. However, the tree was propagated and marketed in the UK by the Hillier & Sons nursery, Winchester, Hampshire, from 1965 to 1977, during which time 49 were sold.

Ulmus thomasii was crossed experimentally with Japanese elm (U. davidiana var. japonica) at the Arnold Arboretum in Massachusetts, but no clones were released to commerce. Seedlings arising from crossings with Siberian elm (U. pumila) at the Lake States Forestry Experimental Station in the 1950s all perished, a classic case of hybrid lethality.

== Notable trees ==
The US National Champion, measuring 100 ft (30 m) high in 1989, grows in Cass County, Michigan.

== Uses ==
The wood of the rock elm is the hardest and heaviest of all elms, and where forest-grown remains comparatively free of knots and other defects. It is also very strong and takes a high polish, and consequently was once in great demand in America and Europe for a wide range of uses, notably boatbuilding, furniture, agricultural tools, and musical instruments.

Much of the timber's strength is derived from the tight grain arising from the tree's very slow rate of growth, the trunk typically increasing in diameter by less than 2 mm (3/32 in) a year. Over 250 annual growth rings were once counted in a log 24 cm (9 1/2 in) square being sawn for gunwales in an English boatyard, while a tree once grown at Kew Gardens, London, attained a height of only 12 m (39 ft) in 50 years.

== Accessions ==
North America

- Arnold Arboretum, Massachusetts, US. Acc. no. 444-88.
- Brenton Arboretum, Dallas Center, Iowa, US. No acc. details available.
- Dominion Arboretum, Ottawa, Canada. No acc. details.
- Morton Arboretum, Illinois, US. Acc. no. 178-84, wild collected from Reedsville, Wisconsin; 843-2005 (Kelleys Island, Erie County, Ohio); 122-2006 (Dixon County, Nebraska).
- Nebraska Statewide Arboretum, US. No details available.

Europe

- Grange Farm Arboretum, Lincolnshire, UK. Acc. no. 706.
- National Botanic Garden of Belgium, Meise, Belgium. Acc. no. 19800105.
- National Botanic Gardens, Ireland, Glasnevin, Ireland. Location: A3 (155)
- Sir Harold Hillier Gardens, Hampshire, UK. Acc. no. 2008.0419, wild collected in Ontario, Canada, by Kristl Walek
- Wakehurst Place Garden Wakehurst Place, UK. Acc. no. 1968-48603.
