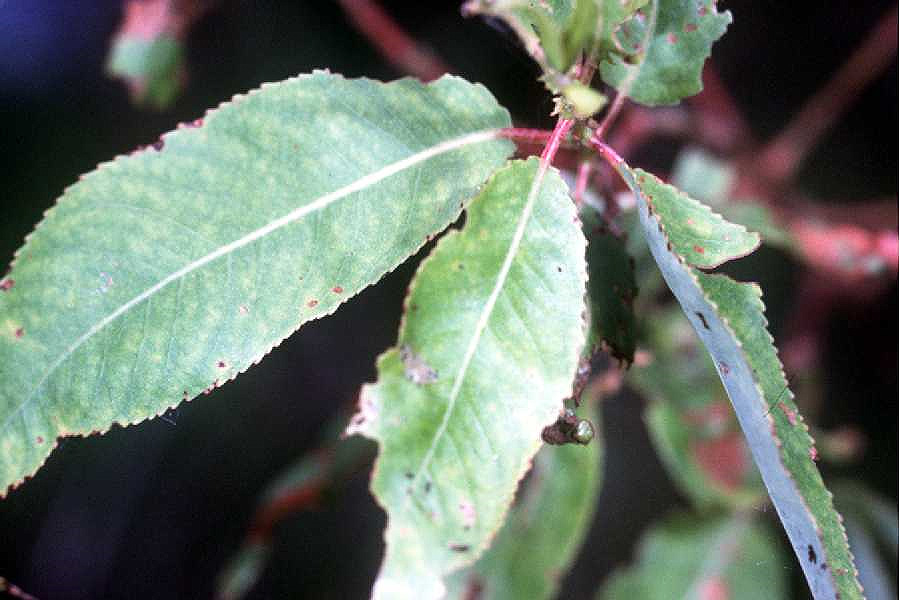
- Peachleaf willow leaves

Conservation status
- Least Concern (IUCN 3.1)

Scientific classification
- Kingdom: Plantae
- Clade: Tracheophytes
- Clade: Angiosperms
- Clade: Eudicots
- Clade: Rosids
- Order: Malpighiales
- Family: Salicaceae
- Genus: Salix
- Species: S. amygdaloides

Binomial name
- Salix amygdaloides Andersson
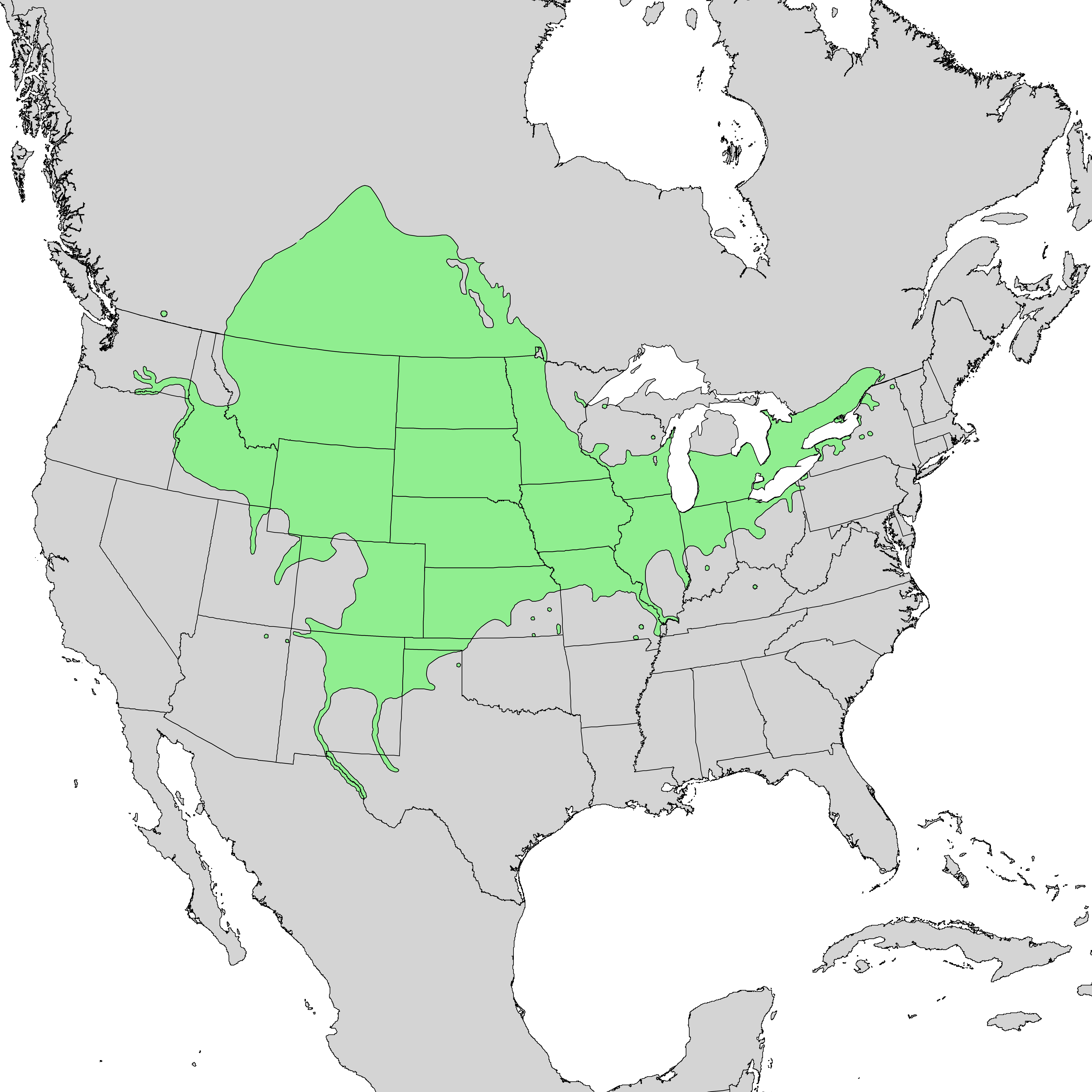
- Natural range

= Salix amygdaloides =

Species of willow

Salix amygdaloides, the almond leaf willow or peach leaf willow, is a species of willow native to central North America east of the Cascade Range. It can be found in southern Canada and the United States—from western British Columbia to Quebec, Idaho, Montana and Arizona to eastern Kentucky. As of 2022, it is presumed extirpated from the state of Kentucky.

It is a small to medium-sized deciduous tree, growing to 4–20 metres (13–66 ft) tall; besides the cottonwoods, it is the largest tree native to the prairies. It has a single trunk, or sometimes several shorter trunks. The leaves are lanceolate, 3–13 centimetres (1 1/4–5 in) long and 1–4 cm (1/2–1 1/2 in) wide, yellowish green with a pale, whitish underside and a finely serrated margin. The flowers are yellow catkins, 3–8 cm (1 1/4–3 1/4 in) long, produced in the spring with the leaves. The reddish-yellow fruit matures in late spring or early summer, and the individual capsules are 4–6 millimetres (3/16–1/4 in) long.

The peachleaf willow grows very quickly, but is short-lived. It can be found on the northern prairies, often near streams, and accompanying cottonwoods. As the common and scientific names suggest, the leaves bear some similarity to those of a peach and (even more so) of an almond.
