= Desert paintbrush =

List of plants with the same or similar names

Desert paintbrush is a common name of two species of plant:

- Castilleja angustifolia, from the northwestern US to northern Mexico
- Castilleja chromosa, from the southwestern US
