= Long leaf paintbrush (disambiguation) =

List of plants with the same or similar names

Long leaf paintbrush is a common name of two species of plant:

- Castilleja linariifolia, more frequently Wyoming paintbrush widespread in the western United States
- Castilleja subinclusa, from central and coastal California to northern Baja California
