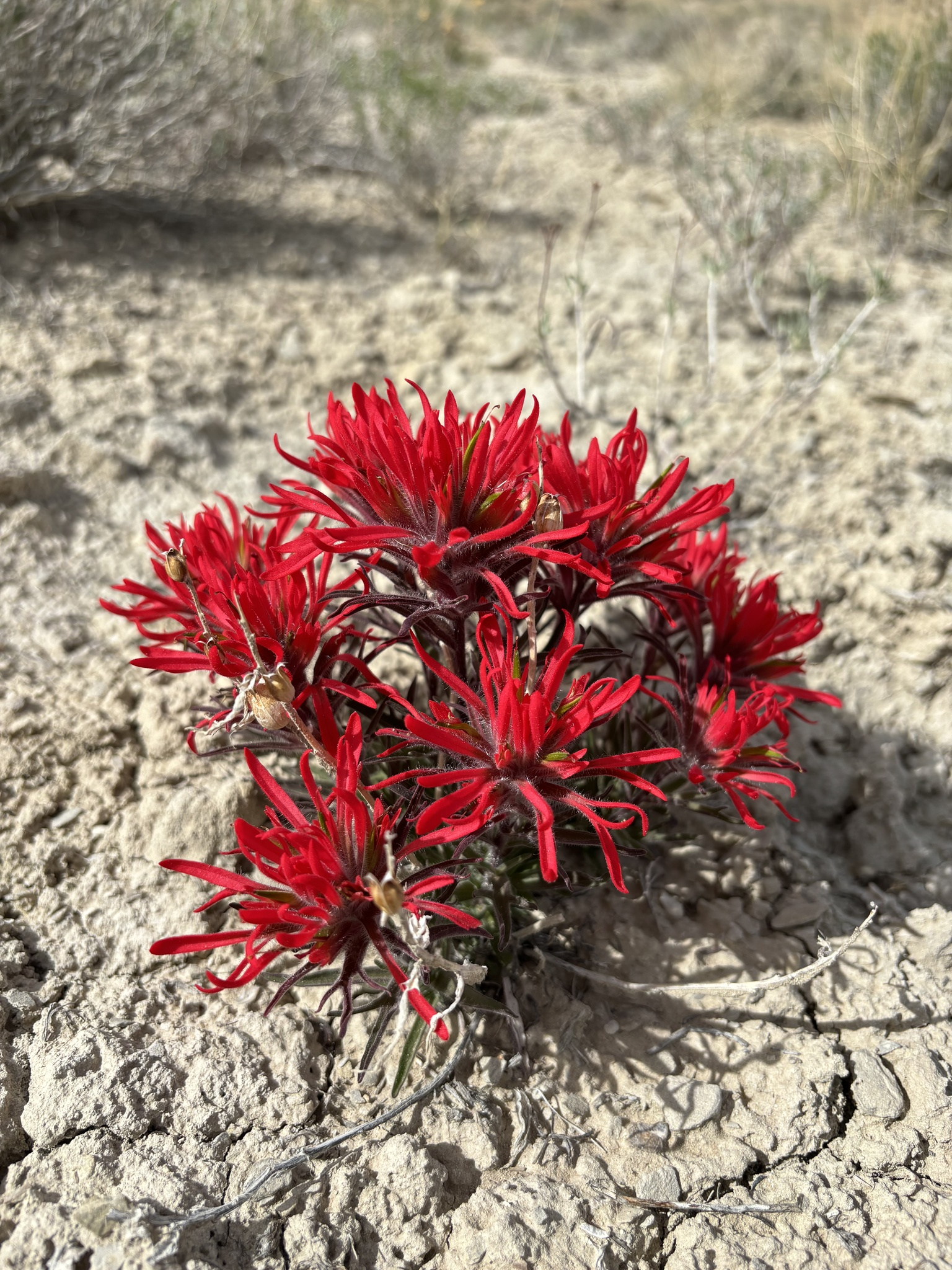
- C. scabrida var. scabrida, Capitol Reef National Park, Utah

Conservation status
- Apparently Secure (NatureServe)

Scientific classification
- Kingdom: Plantae
- Clade: Tracheophytes
- Clade: Angiosperms
- Clade: Eudicots
- Clade: Asterids
- Order: Lamiales
- Family: Orobanchaceae
- Genus: Castilleja
- Species: C. scabrida

Binomial name
- Castilleja scabrida Eastw.

Varieties
- C. scabrida var. barnebyana (Eastw.) N.H.Holmgren; C. scabrida var. scabrida

Synonyms
- Castilleja barnebyana; Castilleja calcicola; Castilleja zionis

= Castilleja scabrida =

Plant species in the broomrape family

Castilleja scabrida, commonly known as rough paintbrush or Eastwood paintbrush, is a species of plant in Castilleja, the paintbrush genus from the Intermountain West mainly in the states of Nevada, Utah, and Colorado.

== Description ==
Castilleja scabrida is a perennial plant that grows herbaceous stems from a woody caudex with either a taproot or thick, branched roots. Stems usually reach 7 to 15 centimeters (2.8 to 5.9 in), but occasionally as much as 20 cm (7.9 in), but are decumbent, growing along the ground with upturned ends. Usually there are several stems without branches in each group. Branching may occur in response to injury of growing stems. Though they do not usually branch, they can occasionally have small leafy shoots where the main leaves attach to the stems. The stems are covered in short, stiff, somewhat white hairs that do not have glands.

Leaves are most often gray-green, but occasionally reddish-purple or fully green. The lowest leaves are small, lack chlorophyll, and resemble scales or bracts on a tenth to quarter of the stem. The more fully developed leaves are 1.5 to 5 centimeters long and are linar to lanceolate, narrow and grass like to resembling a spear head, in shape. All the leaves can have smooth edges or the upper most leaves may have one or occasionally two pairs of side lobes. The lobes may spread outwards or curve upwards.

The inflorescence of the rough paintbrush is the most vividly colored of its genus. It is densely packed with flowers and hairy. The bracts surrounding the flowers are green or green-purple towards the base and usually bright red towards their ends, but can sometimes be brick-red or orange-red. They are linear to lanceolate and usually have three or five lobes, but will sometimes have seven. Their length is 2.5 to 10 cm and have a width of 2.5 to 5 cm. They are more leaf like near the bottom of the inflorescence and become shorter and wider towards the top. The calyx, the sepals, are 19 to 30 mm long and divided into lobes.

== Taxonomy ==
Castilleja scabrida is a species in the Castilleja genus in the Orobanchaceae family. The scientific description and name of Castilleja scabrida was published in 1902 by the self-taught botanist Alice Eastwood. The specimens described by Eastwood were collected in Grand Junction, Colorado by Mr. H.C. Long in the spring of 1890. Later, in 1941, Eastwood described a species she named Castilleja barnebyana that was reclassified by Noel H. Holmgren as a variety of C. scabrida in 1984.

=== Varieties ===
Castilleja scabrida has two accepted varieties.

==== Castilleja scabrida var. barnebyana ====
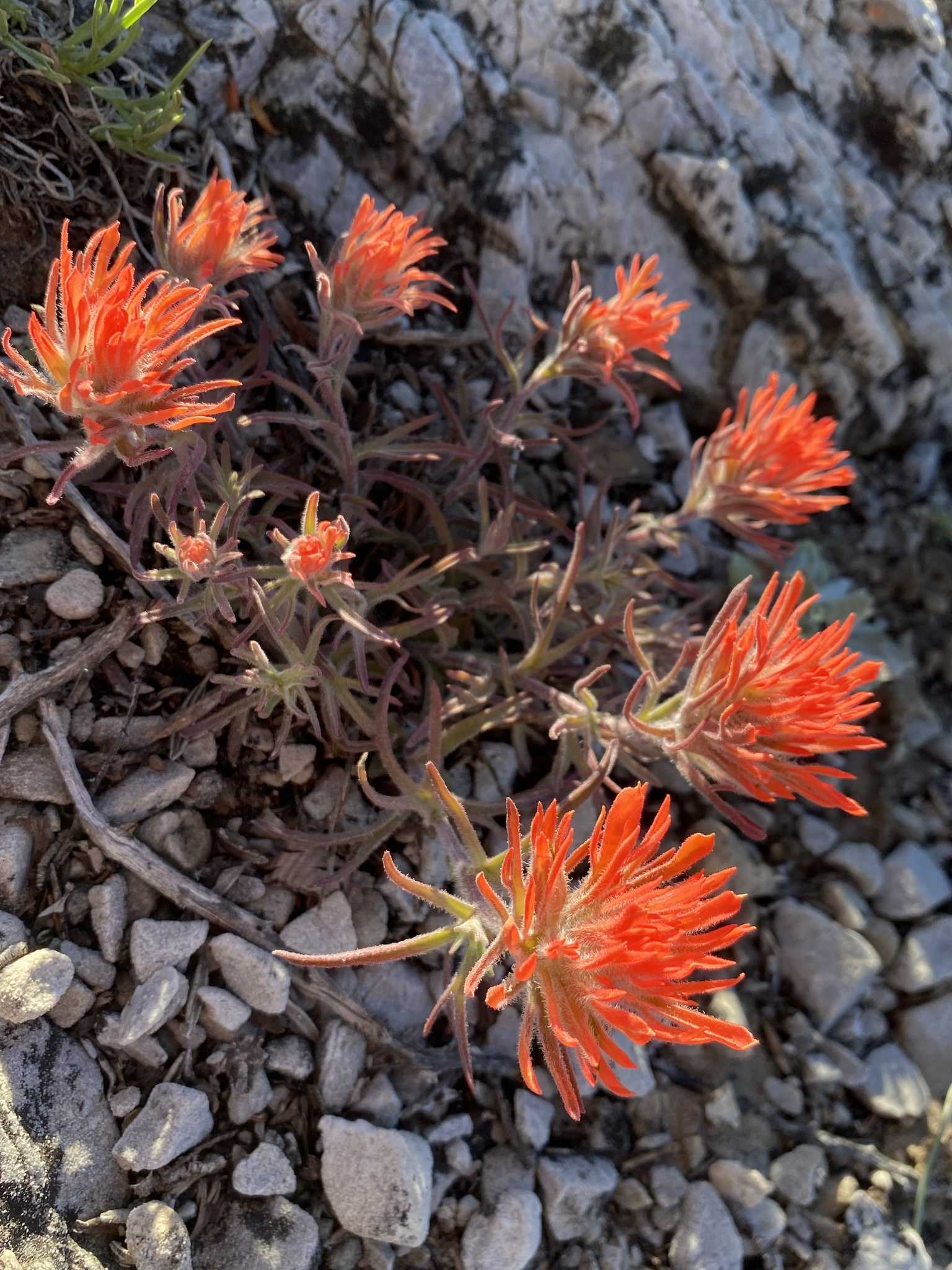
C. scabrida var. barnebyana, Eureka County, Nevada

The leaves of this variety are more green in color, rarely reddish-purple or gray green. It grows on calcareous rocks. It is only found in the mountains of eastern Nevada and western Utah. It most often is a parasite of Petrophytum caespitosum, mat rock spiraea. Often its stems emerge from within a clump of rock spiraea, though it will also be found with other plants.

==== Castilleja scabrida var. scabrida ====
The leaves of this variety are more often grayish in color. Its range is mostly in the high deserts and mountains of Utah and western Colorado, but it does reach a few small areas of Arizona and New Mexico adjacent to the Four Corners. It most often grows on sandstone or soils derived from sandstones, but is sometimes found on clay soils or cryptogamic soils.

=== Synonyms ===
Castilleja scabrida has three synonyms:

Table of Synonyms
Name	Year	Synonym of:	Notes
Castilleja barnebyana Eastw.	1941	var. barnebyana	≡ hom.
Castilleja calcicola Pennell	1959	var. barnebyana	= het.
Castilleja zionis Eastw.	1941	var. scabrida	= het.
Notes: ≡ homotypic synonym; = heterotypic synonym

=== Names ===
The species name scabrida means "rough", referring to the stiff hairs covering the stems and leaves. In English it is also known by the related common name rough paintbrush and is also known as sandstone paintbrush or slickrock paintbrush. Additionally, it is sometimes called Eastwood paintbrush, a reference to Alice Eastwood, the botanist who described the species.

== Range and habitat ==
It is native to five western US states, Arizona, Colorado, New Mexico, Nevada, and Utah. It is only rarely found in Apache County, Arizona and San Juan County, New Mexico. It is much more commonly encountered in Utah and southwestern Colorado. It grows at elevations from 1,200 to 2,800 meters (3,900 to 9,200 ft).

Usually found on slopes and rock outcrops in open pinyon-juniper woodlands.

=== Conservation ===
Castilleja scabrida was evaluated by NatureServe in 1990 and rated as apparently secure (G4). At the state level they rated it as vulnerable (G3) in Nevada and Utah, but did not evaluate it in other states. While variety scabrida was also evaluated as apparently secure, they evaluated variety barnebyana as a vulnerable variety (T3) in 1998. It was also rated as vulnerable in Nevada and imperiled (S2) in Utah.

== Ecology ==
The seeds of Castilleja scabrida require cold stratification before germination. In a study germination rates increased with length of prechill treatment up to sixteen weeks. Temperatures of 3 °C (37 °F) or less were required for good germination. Ideal temperatures for germination are 21 to 25 °C (70 to 77 °F) during the day and 10 to 16 °C (50 to 61 °F) at night. In controlled experiments C. scabrida, like orange paintbrush (Castilleja integra) and desert paintbrush (Castilleja chromosa), it was tolerant of being without a host species for short periods.

== Uses ==
Rough paintbrush has high potential as a garden species. In experiments it was relatively tolerant of garden operations like transplantation and its seeds have a moderate germination rate in greenhouse flats.

== See also ==
- List of Castilleja species
