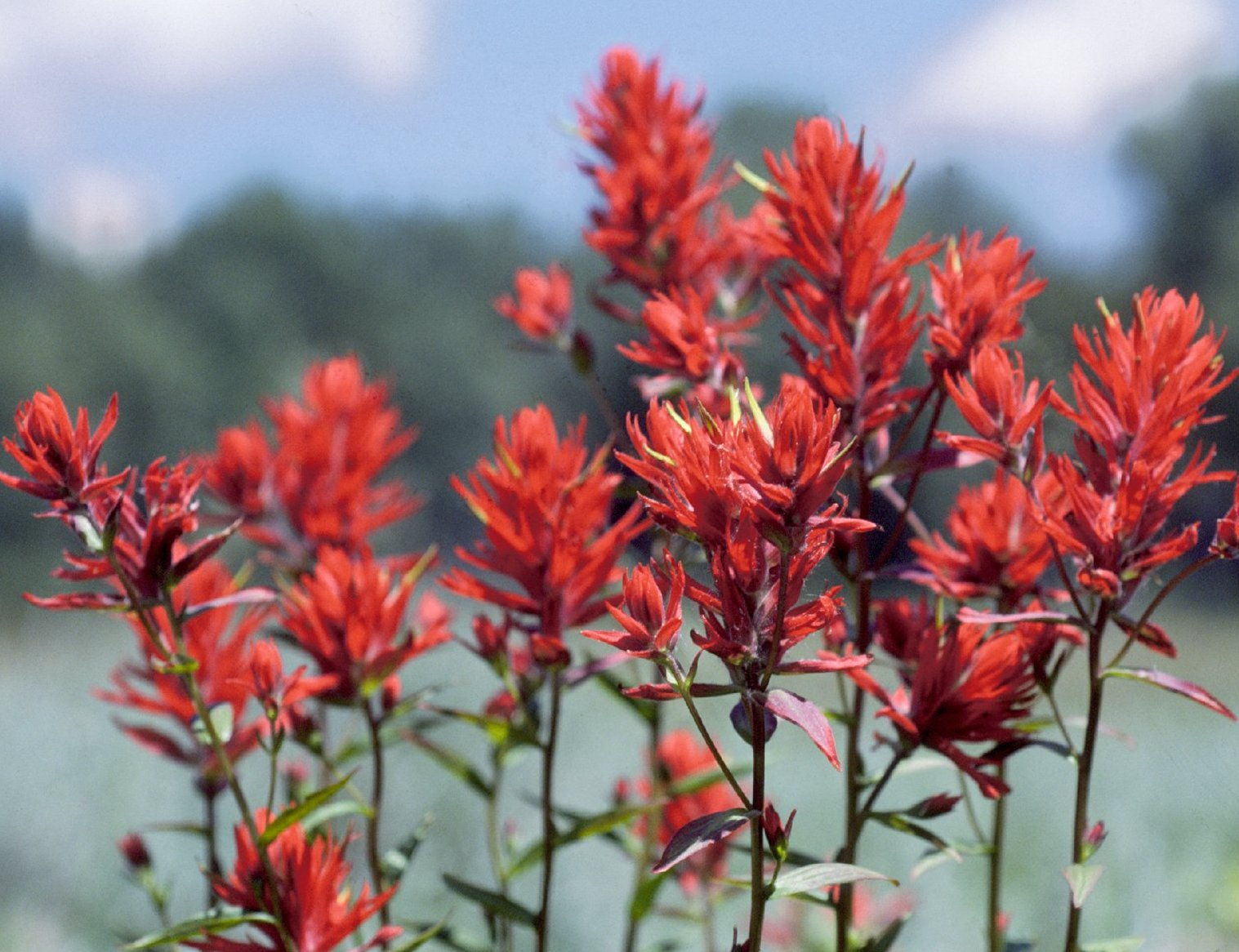
- Castilleja linariifolia, in the Grand Teton National Park, Wyoming.

Conservation status
- Secure (NatureServe)

Scientific classification
- Kingdom: Plantae
- Clade: Tracheophytes
- Clade: Angiosperms
- Clade: Eudicots
- Clade: Asterids
- Order: Lamiales
- Family: Orobanchaceae
- Genus: Castilleja
- Species: C. linariifolia

Binomial name
- Castilleja linariifolia Benth.

= Castilleja linariifolia =

Species of flowering plant

Castilleja linariifolia is a perennial plant, native to the United States and is the state flower of Wyoming. It has a number of common names including Wyoming paintbrush and Wyoming paintedcup.

== Description ==
Wyoming paintbrush is a perennial plant that typically grows 18 to 100 centimeters (7–39 in) tall, but can occasionally reach a height of two meters (6 1/2 ft). It is usually taller than other species of paintbrush flower. Each plant will have a few to several stems growing straight upwards or leaning out somewhat from the crown and usually branching towards the top. Lower down they can be hairless or puberulent, covered in very short and thin hairs that usually stand straight out from the stem surface. Towards the flowering ends they are sometimes hairless, but more often hispid to villous, covered in bristly hair or ones that are long and soft, but not matted together. None of its hairs are glandular. Underground it has a woody caudex atop its branched or single taproot.

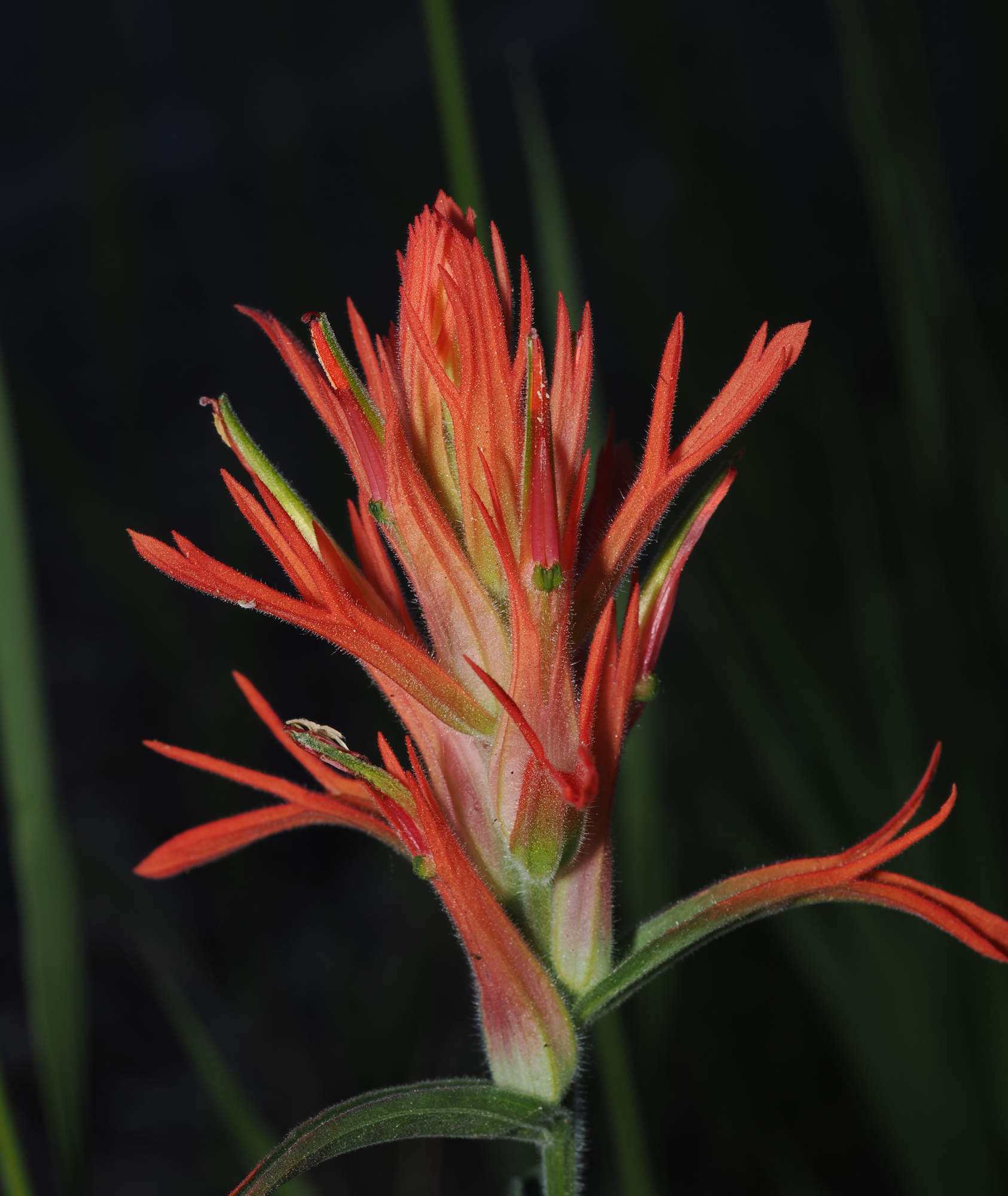
Inflorescence photographed north of the canyon in Grand Canyon National Park

The leaves on Wyoming paintbrush are usually gray-green to more or less yellow, but sometimes can be fairly purple. They measure 1–10 centimeters long, but are only rarely shorter than 2 cm. Usually the leaves will have smooth edges and no lobes, but leaves higher up can sometimes have pairs of narrow side lobes or very rarely all the leaves can have lobes. Usually leaves will have just one pair of side lobes, but very rarely they can have two, giving five lobes in total including the end of the leaf. When lobes are present they spread widely. Usually the leaves are narrow and grass-like or even thread-like, but can be a narrow lanceolate shape on occasion. Usually they are hairless, but like the stems they can be hairy. They are not fleshy in texture, though they can be somewhat thickened or have fleshy edges that roll inwards.

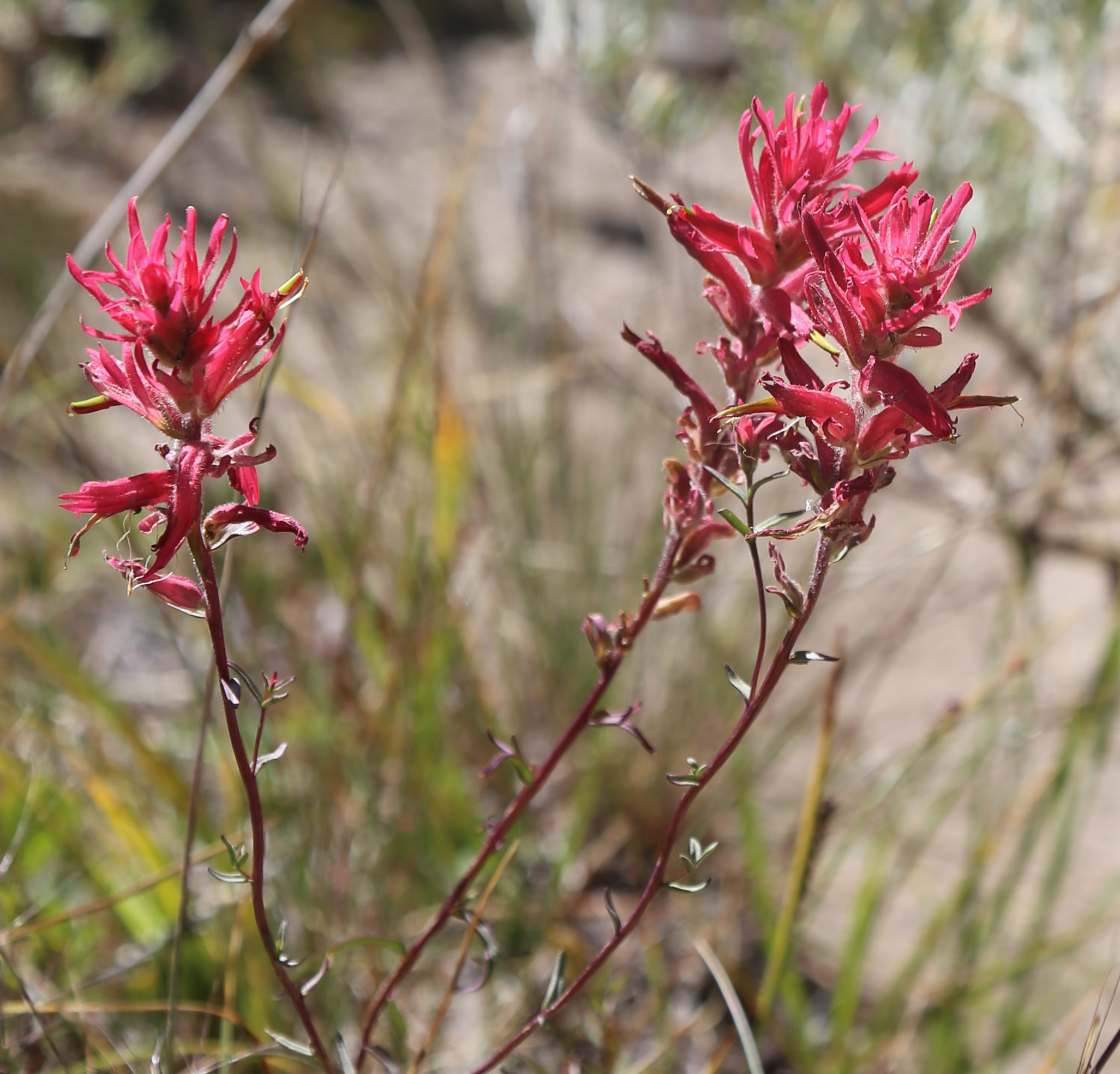
Castilleja linariifolia pinkish flowers

The upper 4 to 20 centimeters (1.5–8 in) of the stem ends are an inflorescence with a diameter of 2–7.5 cm (1–3 in). The inflorescence of the Wyoming paintbrush is a raceme that is spicate, the flowers attached singly directly to the main stem without a short stem. They become more widely spaced apart lower down the stem. The blooms are quite striking with botanist Francis Marion Ownbey writing in the Vascular plants of the Pacific Northwest, "This is our most spectacular species of Castilleja".

The flowers are partly concealed inside the colorful calyces, the fused sepals, and the bracts. The bracts are normally completely red to red-orange, but color variations such as pale green, yellow, magenta, pink-purple, or white are all possible. Additionally, they can be pale green or pale yellow near the base with any of the color variations. Each bract will usually have pair or two pairs of side lobes that can spread outwards or point upwards together. The calyces are generally longer than the bracts, generally 1.8–3 cm long, but rarely 3.5 cm. The bases are greenish, whitish, or yellowish and matching the color of the bracts further up. The cut on the front side is about 70% of the total length and the one on the rear 20–25% of the length. Inside the flower is tubular with a beak shape with a total length of 2.5–4.5 cm and usually slightly curved. They are yellow-green or green. Blooming may occur as early as April or as late as October in parts of its native range.

The fruits are capsules that are 9–13 millimeters long.

It can be distinguished from giant red paintbrush (Castilleja miniata) by the 1.2–2.2 cm long cut on the front of its partly fused sepals.

== Taxonomy ==
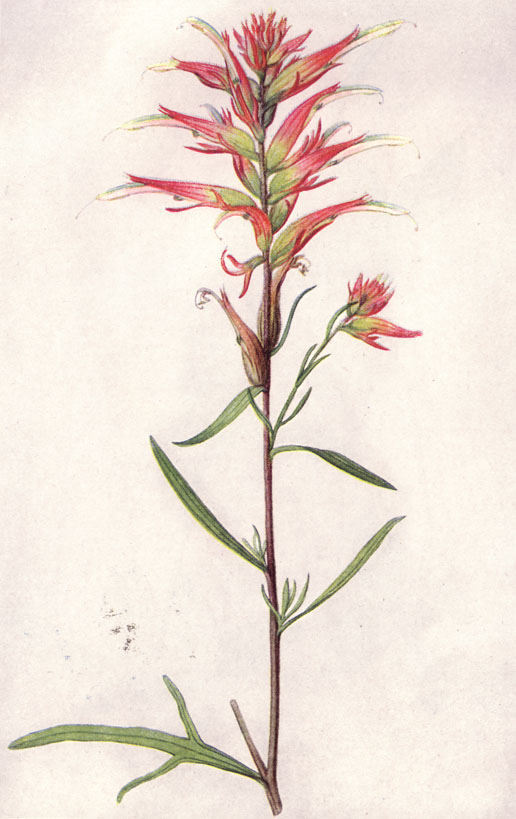
An illustration from National Geographic in 1917.

Castilleja linariifolia was scientifically described and named in 1846 by George Bentham. It was described in Latin in the tenth volume of Prodromus Systematis Naturalis Regni Vegetabilis using the spelling C. linariæfolia. The type specimen was collected by John C. Frémont in August 1842. The specimen has a note attached by the botanist Francis W. Pennell identifying the location as in the Laramie Mountains in either Platte or Converse County. It is classified in the genus Castilleja as part of the family Orobanchaceae. It has no accepted varieties, but has two variety names in its twelve synonyms.

Table of Synonyms
Name	Year	Rank	Notes
Castilleja affinis var. linariifolia (Benth.) Zeile	1925	variety	≡ hom.
Castilleja arcuata Rydb.	1907	species	= het.
Castilleja candens Durand & Hilg.	1854	species	= het.
Castilleja fulgens Nutt. ex A.Gray	1859	species	= het.
Castilleja howellii Eastw.	1941	species	= het.
Castilleja linariifolia var. filiformis Daniels	1911	variety	= het.
Castilleja linariifolia var. omnipubescens (Pennell) Clokey	1945	variety	= het.
Castilleja linariifolia f. omnipubescens Pennell	1937	form	= het.
Castilleja linariifolia f. rosea Cockerell	1890	form	= het.
Castilleja linearis Rydb.	1901	species	= het.
Castilleja salticola Eastw.	1940	species	= het.
Castilleja trainii Edwin	1959	species	= het.
Notes: ≡ homotypic synonym; = heterotypic synonym

The rare species Castilleja christii from Mount Harrison in Idaho originated from homoploid hybridization between Wyoming paintbrush and giant red paintbrush (Castilleja miniata). Though originating from two typically red species, C. christii has yellow to yellow-orange bracts.

=== Names ===
Its species name, linariifolia, means "with leaves like toadflax (Linaria)" in Botanical Latin, referring to the plant's narrow leaves. It is known by the common name Wyoming paintbrush. Similar common names include Wyoming paintedcup, Wyoming painted cup, and Wyoming Indian paintbrush. It is also known as the long-leaf paintbrush, longleaf paintbrush, narrow-leaved paintbrush, or Linaria-leaf Castilleja. It shares the name narrowleaf paintbrush with Castilleja angustifolia. Like other species in its genus, it is also simply called paintbrush or paintbrushes.

In the Hopi language it is referred to as pala'mansi meaning "red flower".

== Distribution and habitat ==
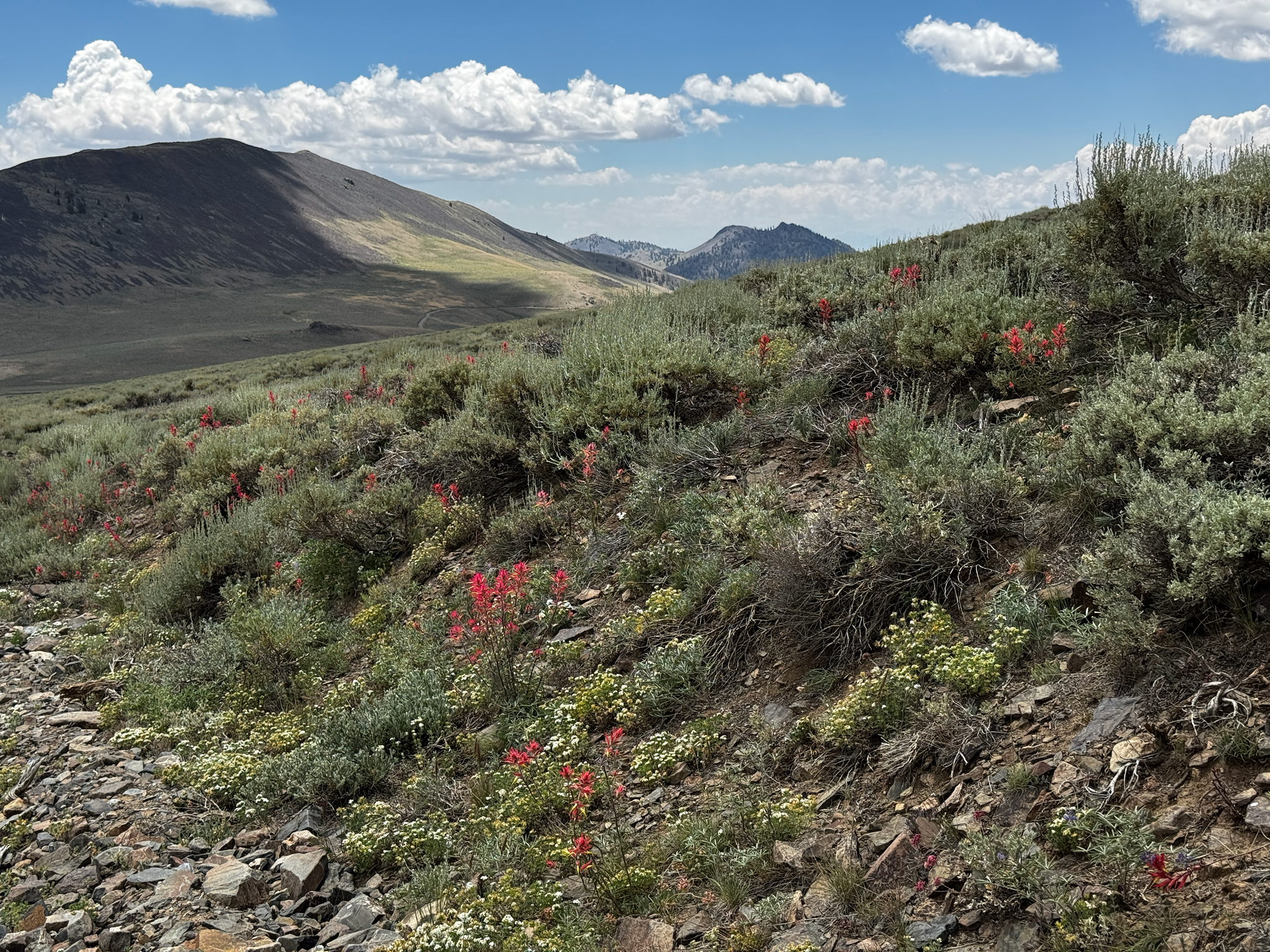
Castilleja linariifolia blooming amid sagebrush on the flank of Campito Mountain in the White Mountains, Mono County, California

The Wyoming paintbrush is native to every western US state from the Rocky Mountains to the Pacific, with the exception of Washington state. It is also native to just the state of Sonora in the northwest of Mexico. In Wyoming it is found in most of the state, only absent from eight of the 23 counties, six of them in the eastern part of the state. To the North in Montana it grows from Big Horn County in the south to Missoula County in the west, eight counties in total. In Idaho it is mainly a species of the south, but is found in some of the northern counties including Bonner County near the border in the panhandle. Its range in Oregon covers the southeastern half of the state. Wyoming painbrush grows in California from the Cascade Range, the high Sierra Nevada, and Transverse Ranges and to the east in the Mojave Desert and Modoc Plateau. In Nevada and Utah they are recorded in every county of both states. In Colorado it is found in all parts of the western half of the state and is absent from all counties of the shortgrass prairie. It is found at elevations as low as 600 meters (2,000 ft) to as high as 3,400 meters (11,200 ft).

The species is associated with habitats such as the sagebrush steppe, grasslands, and pinyon–juniper woodlands. They often grow on dry rocky slopes, dry plains, talus deposits at the base of cliffs, and in forest openings.

== Ecology ==
The Edith's checkerspot butterfly (Euphydryas editha) in some areas such as Gunnison County, Colorado feeds nearly exclusively on the Wyoming paintbrush. Other species in the area such as desert paintbrush (Castilleja chromosa) and Rocky Mountain penstemon (Penstemon strictus) have similar nutritional qualities, but the greater and more consistent availability of Wyoming paintbrush such as droughts are thought to have given the butterfly a preference for this paintbrush species.

== Culture ==
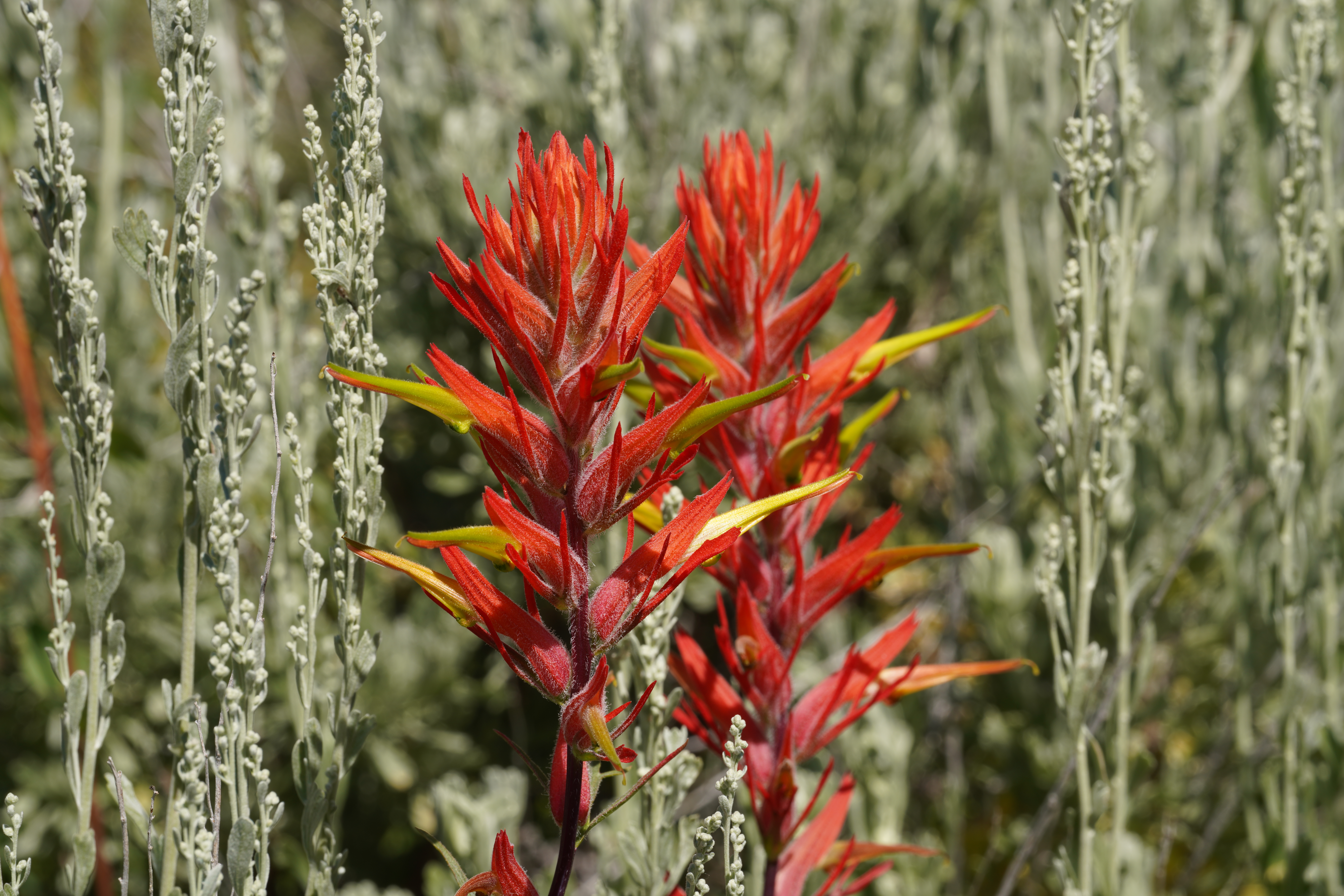
Fossil Butte National Monument, Lincoln County, Wyoming

When options were being considered for a state flower for Wyoming, Dr. Grace Raymond Hebard from the University of Wyoming promoted this species over rival candidates including the columbine and fringed gentian. Professor Aven Nelson, a botanist with the University of Wyoming, opposed the selection of a paintbrush as the state flower. First on the grounds that it was difficult for non-botanists to tell one species from another. Second, that as a parasitic plant it had negative associations and could not be easily cultivated in gardens unlike other popular state flowers like the Colorado columbine or California poppy.

The State of Wyoming officially adopted the Indian paintbrush ("Castilleja linariaefolia") as the state flower of Wyoming on 31 January 1917.

Its seeds are sometimes part of wildflower mixes sold for use in the southwestern United States. Attempts to transplant paintbrush plants from the wild are rarely successful.

Among the Tewa from Hano in Arizona the red flowers of the narrowleaved paintbrush are a frequent subject of decorative art. It is painted onto pottery, carved into wood, and imitated in colored yarn. According to some Shoshone people interviewed at Beatty and Tonopah, Nevada during the 1930s it was used as a traditional medicine for venereal diseases. The roots were boiled in water and then small amounts were consumed over a long period of time. It was also regarded as useful to 'purify' the blood, to cause vomiting, and as a general medicine.

== See also ==
- List of U.S. state flowers
