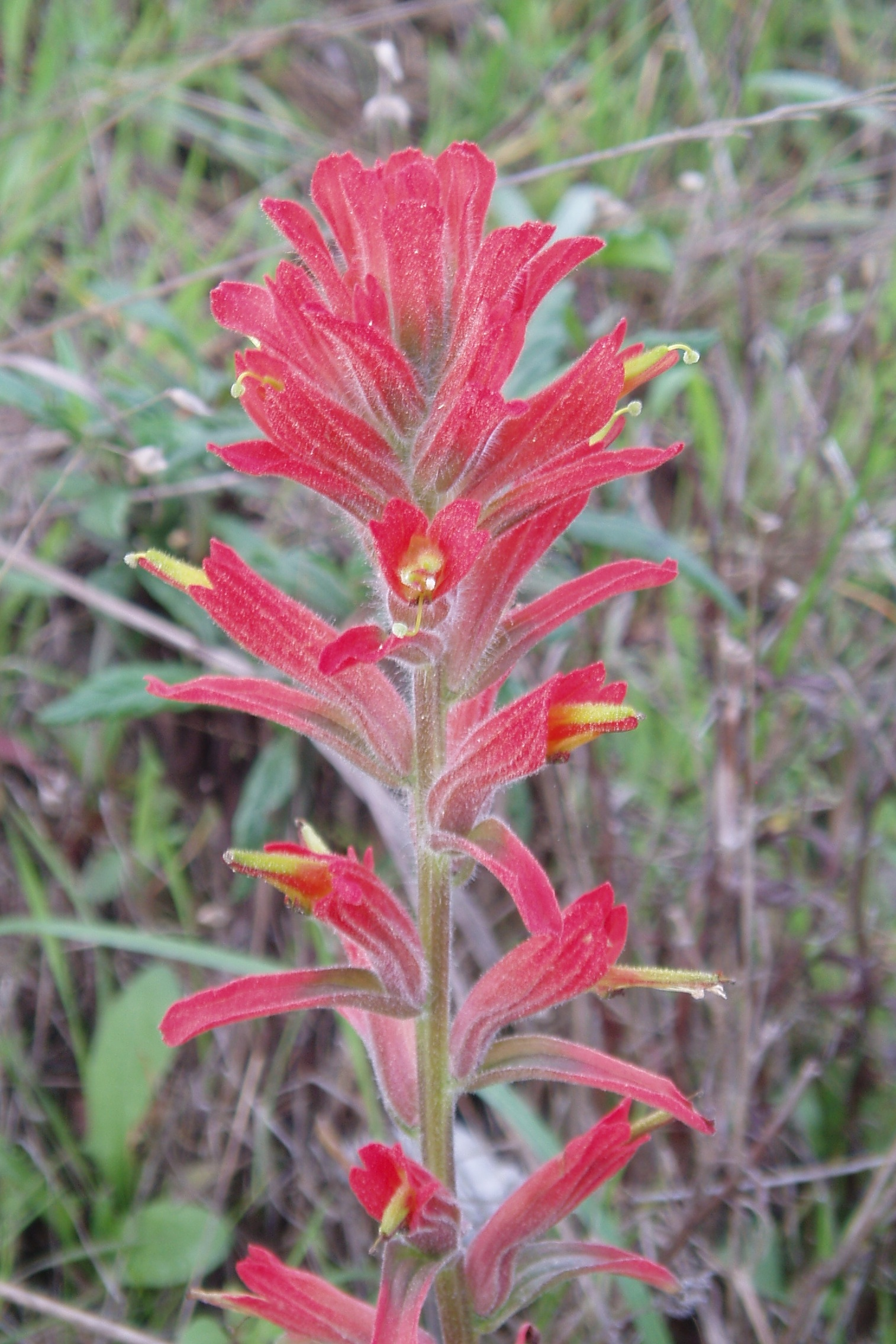
- C. subinclusa var. franciscana

Conservation status
- Vulnerable (NatureServe)

Scientific classification
- Kingdom: Plantae
- Clade: Tracheophytes
- Clade: Angiosperms
- Clade: Eudicots
- Clade: Asterids
- Order: Lamiales
- Family: Orobanchaceae
- Genus: Castilleja
- Species: C. subinclusa

Binomial name
- Castilleja subinclusa Greene

Varieties
- C. s. var. franciscana; C. s. var. jepsonii; C. s. var. subinclusa

Synonyms
- Castilleja franciscana; Castilleja jepsonii

= Castilleja subinclusa =

Plant species in the broomrape family

Castilleja subinclusa is a species of paintbrush known by the common name long leaf paintbrush. It has three varieties, one of which is known as Franciscan paintbrush. It is native to California and Baja California, where it grows in a number of habitat types from the coast to the Sierra Nevada mountains.

== Description ==
Long leaf paintbrush is a perennial plant that is 18 to 120 centimeters (7.1–47.2 in) tall when fully grown. Its single to multiple stems sprout from a woody caudex topping a taproot. The stems can grow straight upward, lean outward somewhat, or rest against nearby plants and shrubs in variety jepsonii. It is gray-green to purple in herbage color, and usually hairy. The lance-shaped leaves are up to 8 centimeters long.

The inflorescence is up to 40 centimeters long and is made up of long, pointed bracts tipped in bright red-orange to deep red. Between the colorful bracts appear lighter flowers, which are yellow-green to pinkish and hairy.

== Taxonomy ==
Castilleja subinclusa was scientifically described and named by Edward Lee Greene in 1901. It is part of the genus Castilleja within the family Orobanchaceae. It has three accepted varieties, listed in sources such as The Jepson Manual as subspecies. The three varieties have ranges that overlap very little.

Castilleja subinclusa var. franciscana

This variety was first described as a species named Castilleja franciscana in 1947 by Francis W. Pennell. It was reclassified as a variety by Guy L. Nesom in 1992. It grows in the coastal counties of central and northern California from Santa Cruz County north to It is known by the common name Franciscan paintbrush.

Castilleja subinclusa var. jepsonii

In 1966 this variety was described as a species named Castilleja jepsonii by Rimo Bacigalupi and Lawrence Ray Heckard. It was reduced to a variety of C. subinclusa in 2008 by J.M. Berger. It is regarded as synonym of subspecies subinclusa in The Jepson Manual. It grows in southern California from the Transverse Ranges and southwestern parts of the Sierra Nevada southwards into northern Baja California. It is called Jepson's paintbrush.

Castilleja subinclusa var. subinclusa

The autonymic variety has no synonyms. It grows in the foothills of the Sierra Nevada from Calaveras County north to Placer County in the central part of the state.

=== Names ===
Castilleja subinclusa is known by the common names long leaf paintbrush, longleaf Indian paintbrush, and longleaf Indian-paintbrush.

== Range and habitat ==
Long leaf paintbrush grows in central and southern California and in northern Baja California. The species can be found from sea level to elevations of 2,200 meters (7,200 ft) in the Sierra Nevada.

The variety franciscana grows in the coastal sage scrub plant community. Variety jepsonii grows in the chaparral, California oak woodland, and desert scrub. Variety subinclusa also grows in pine-oak woods.
