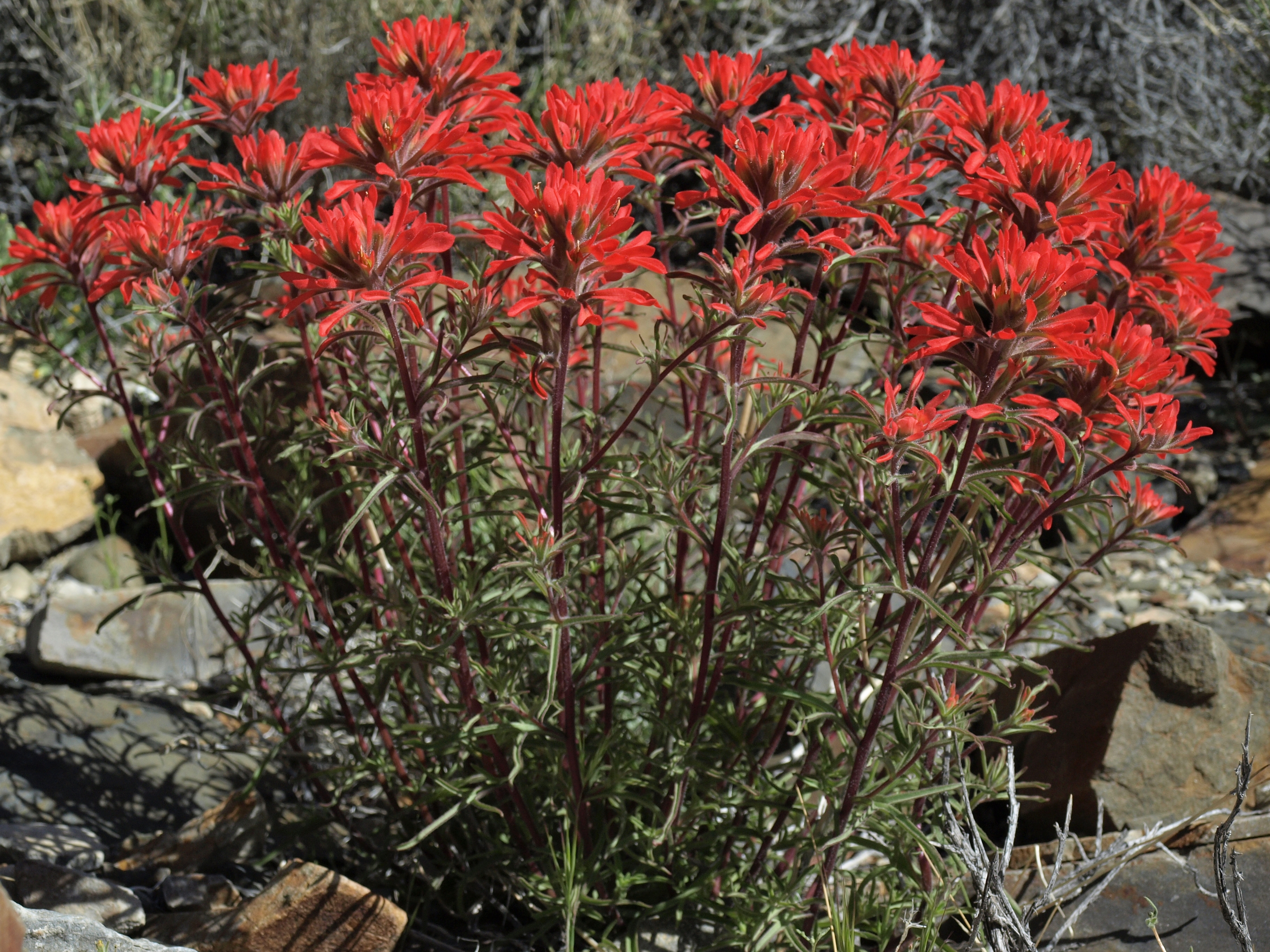

Scientific classification
- Kingdom: Plantae
- Clade: Embryophytes
- Clade: Tracheophytes
- Clade: Spermatophytes
- Clade: Angiosperms
- Clade: Eudicots
- Clade: Asterids
- Order: Lamiales
- Family: Orobanchaceae
- Genus: Castilleja
- Species: C. chromosa

Binomial name
- Castilleja chromosa A.Nelson

= Castilleja chromosa =

Species of plant

Castilleja chromosa, the desert paintbrush, is a species of flowering plant in the family Orobanchaceae found in the western United States. They are distributed in dry scrub, steppe, and desert. They have colorful inflorescences which range from yellow to red in hue. This color is given not by the flowers, which are small, but by the colorful bracts. The plants grow up to nearly half a meter (~1.5 ft) tall and are slightly bristly and greyish-green. Their stems do not branch, and their leaves are small and lance-shaped. Partial parasites, they steal some of their nutrients from neighboring plants.

== Description ==
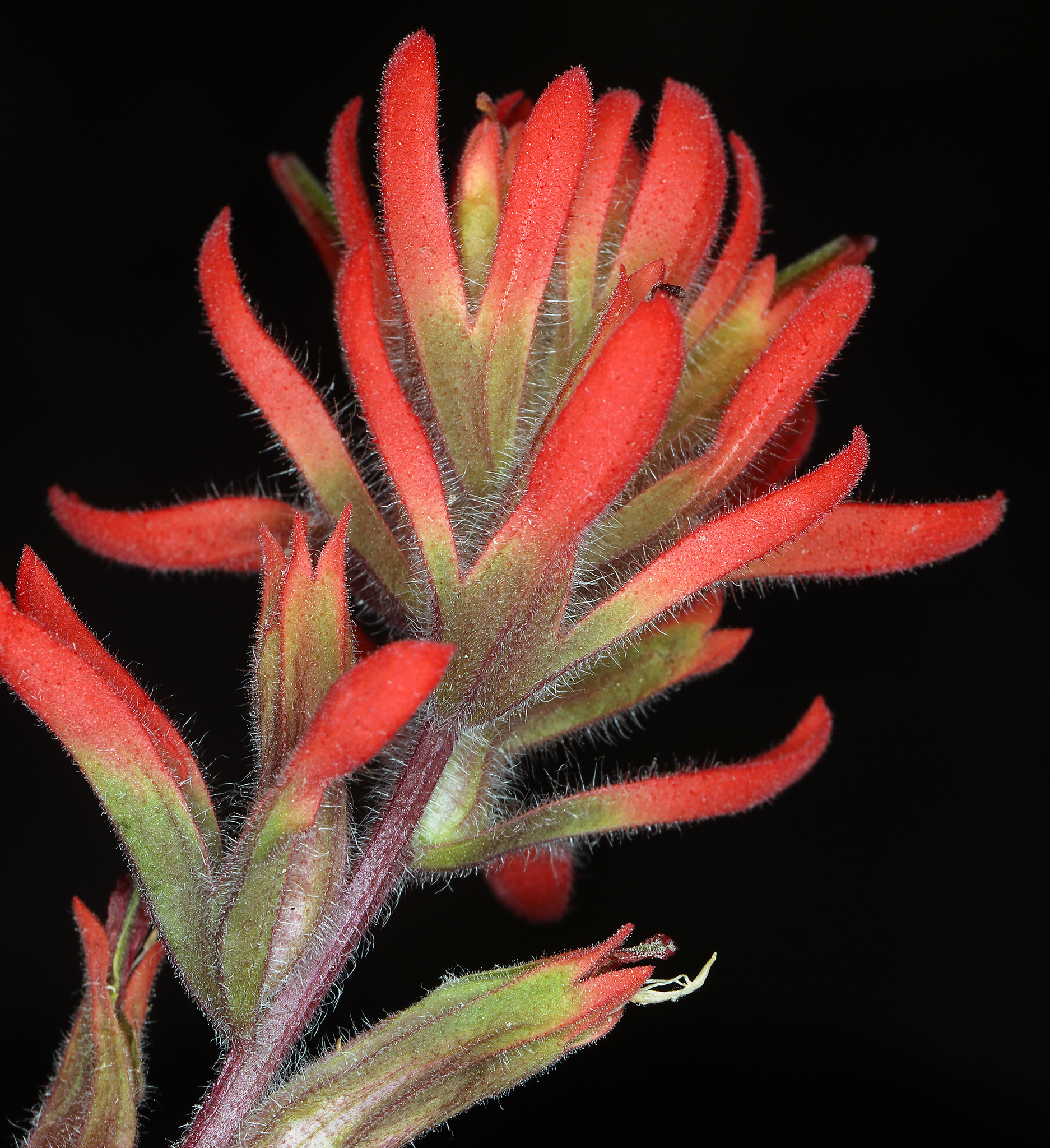
Half of the bracts are bright red and may be confused with the petals.

The desert paintbrush, which blooms between May and September, has large, colorful inflorescences between 2.5 and 15 centimeters (1 and 6 in) long and 1.5 to 5.5 cm (0.6 to 2.2 in) wide. The inflorescence is also hirsute to sometimes pilose, covered in coarse hairs or covered in long soft hairs. The bracts are often confused with the petals; the upper half of the bracts are orange or bright red, occasionally yellow, dull orange, or subdued pink. At their base they are more green or a muted purple, but they are never purple towards their ends. Each bract will usually be divided into three, five, or seven primary lobes; however, they may occasionally lack divisions or have the lobes further divided into smaller secondary lobes.

The actual flowers are yellowish-green with more or less reddish edges, tubular, and unremarkable. The overall length is just 2.1 to 3.2 cm (0.8 to 1.3 in). The lower lip of the tube is reduced and dark green with incurving teeth, while the upper beak is more than half the total length of the flower.

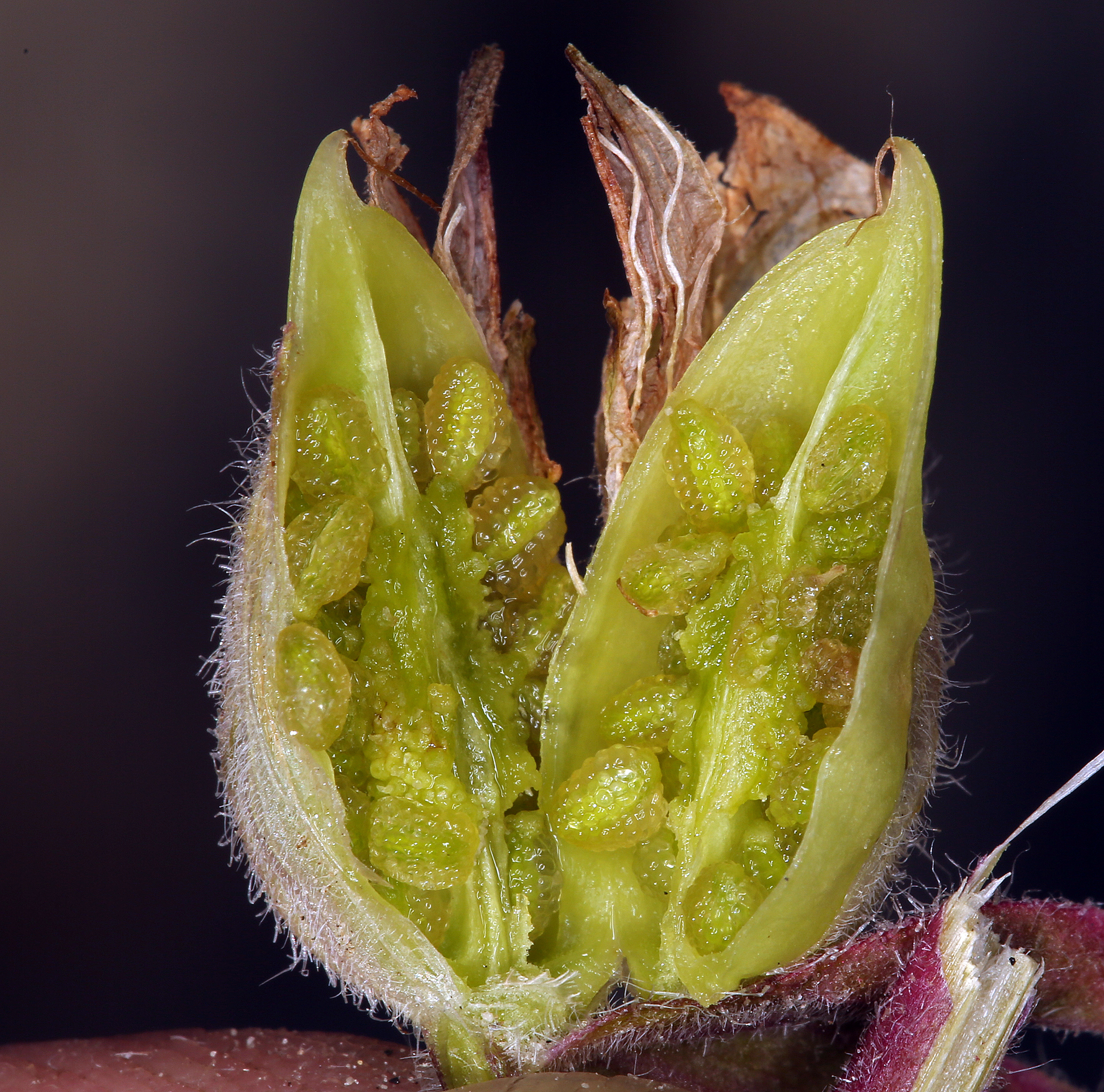
Unripe seed pod, split open

As flowering progresses and the seeds begin to develop, the inflorescence grows much longer. The fruits measure between 1 and 1.5 centimeters (0.4 and 0.6 in) long and the seeds 2 mm (0.08 in). The seed surface has a wrinkled, net like appearance when ripe.

The plants are gray-green perennials that are at times subshrubs, having partly woody stems especially towards their bases. Underground, they have a thick taproot topped by a woody caudex. They grow between 15 and 35 centimeters (0.5 and 1.1 ft) tall, though in good conditions they may reach 45 cm (1.5 ft). Plants frequently have many straight to slightly curved, clustered stems that rarely branch higher up; they are more or less covered with bristly hairs.

The leaves may be as little as 1.5 cm (0.6 in) in length or as long as 7 cm (2.8 in) but are more typically between 2.5 and 6 cm (1.0 and 2.4 in). They attach alternately to the stems and can be linear, lanceolate, or oblanceolate – narrow like a grass blade, shaped like a spear head, or a reversed spear head with the wider part past the midpoint. Like the bracts, they are divided into lobes – most often three or five, but sometimes as many as seven or lacking divisions altogether.

== Taxonomy ==
Castilleja chromosa is classified in the genus Castilleja within the family Orobanchaceae. Its scientific description and name was published by Aven Nelson in 1899. The desert paintbrush is similar to, and often confused with, Castilleja angustifolia. It is known to form hybrids with Castilleja miniata.

Castilleja chromosa has both diploid and tetraploid populations. In a 1977 study, no association was found with elevation, but diploid individuals were almost always found with Artemisia tridentata, big sagebrush.

It has nine synonyms.

Table of Synonyms
Name	Year	Rank	Notes
Castilleja angustifolia var. collina (A.Nelson) Garrett	1911	variety	= het.
Castilleja collina A.Nelson	1901	species	= het.
Castilleja eremophila Wooton & Standl.	1913	species	= het.
Castilleja ewanii Eastw.	1941	species	= het.
Castilleja helleri Edwin	1959	species	= het.
Castilleja martini subsp. ewanii (Eastw.) Munz	1958	subspecies	= het.
Castilleja martini var. ewanii (Eastw.) N.H.Holmgren	1971	variety	= het.
Castilleja miniata var. chromosa (A.Nelson) Garrett	1911	variety	≡ hom.
Castilleja pyramidalis Edwin	1959	species	= het.
Notes: ≡ homotypic synonym; = heterotypic synonym

=== Names ===
The species name chromosa means "colorful", a reference to the bright colors of its bracts. In English, it is often known by the common name desert paintbrush. It is also known as the desert Indian paintbrush – Indian in the context referring to Indigenous people. It is also sometimes called the red desert paintbrush.

== Range and habitat ==
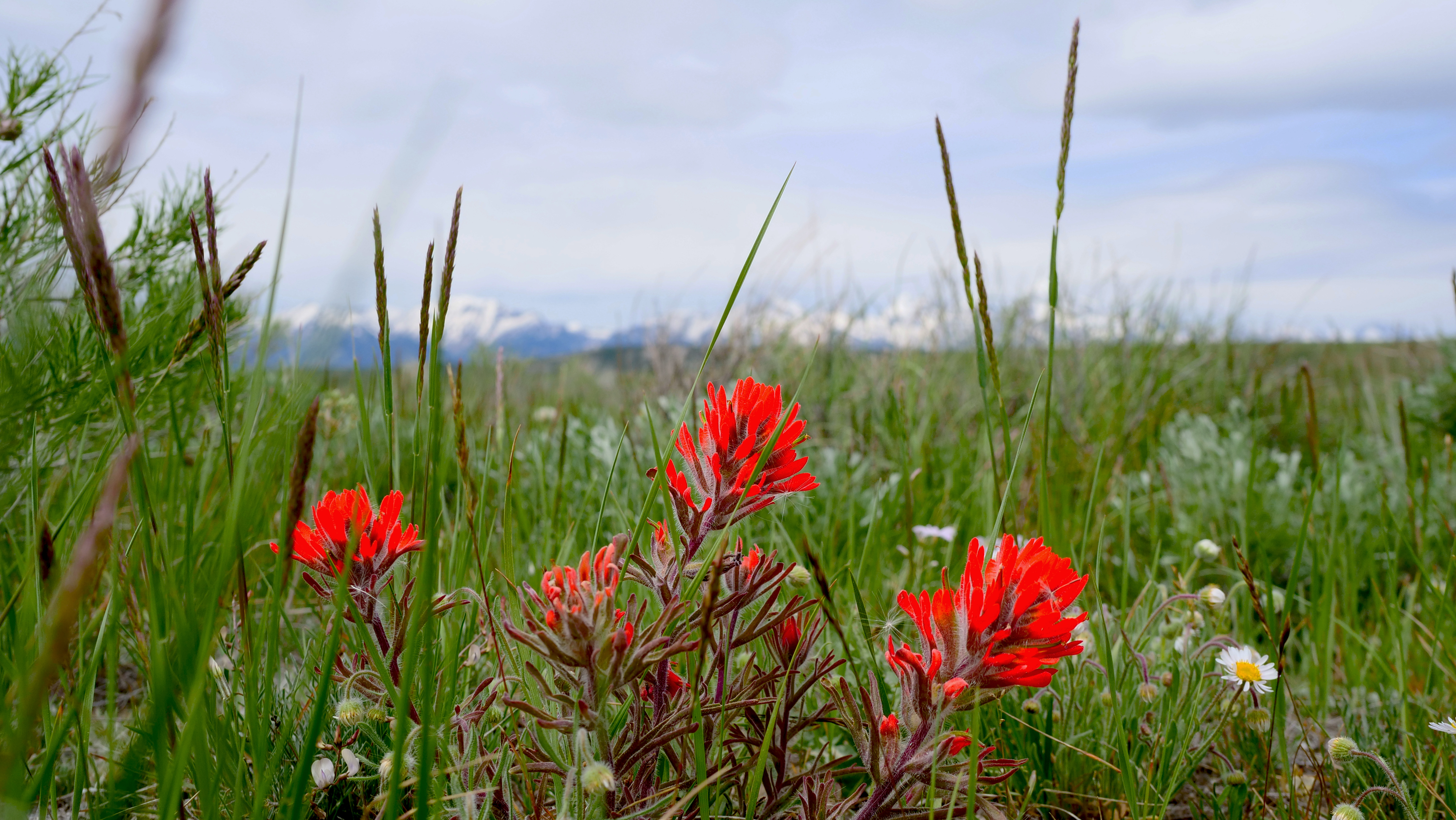
In the National Elk Refuge in Wyoming

The desert paintbrush is distributed across ten western US states. In California, it largely grows east of the Cascade Range, the Sierra Nevada, San Bernardino Mountains, and San Jacinto Mountains. Likewise, it is largely native to eastern parts of Oregon with only a few reports of the species west of the Cascades. It grows in most of Idaho, but its exact distribution in Montana and Wyoming is not recorded by the USDA Natural Resources Conservation Service. It also has no exact locations recorded for Nevada, but grows in every county of Utah. In Colorado, it grows largely west of the Rocky Mountains. Similarly, it grows in the northwestern quarter of New Mexico and all but the southernmost counties of Arizona.

It grows in several different habitats, including the sagebrush steppe, blackbrush scrub, piñon–juniper woodlands, and juniper woodlands. The elevation range for the species is quite wide, from 500 to 3,200 meters (1,600 to 10,500 ft).

== Ecology ==
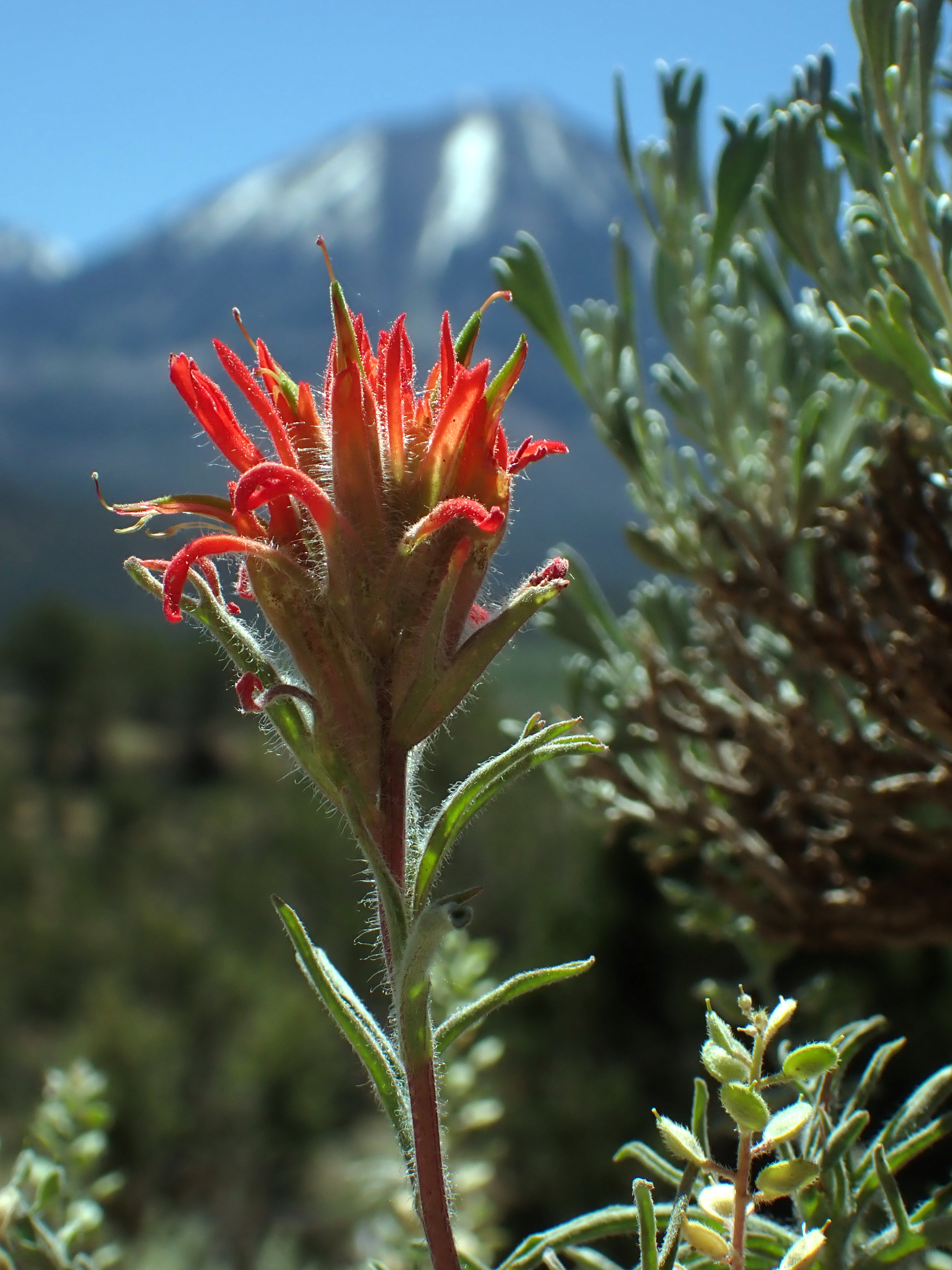
In juniper woodland in western Colorado, with big sagebrush

Like some other members of their genus, the plants are partially parasitic, using their haustoria to take some, but not all, of the nutrition they require from other plants. The big sagebrush and other plants in the aster family are common hosts. In a study of the parasitization of big sagebrush by desert paintbrush, they were found to get about 10% of their sugar energy from host plants. In controlled experiments, the desert paintbrush – like orange paintbrush (Castilleja integra) and rough paintbrush (Castilleja scabrida) – was tolerant of being without a host species for short periods.

Desert paintbrushes are hyperaccumulators of the element selenium.

Pollinators of the plant include butterflies, hummingbirds, and bees.

=== Conservation ===
As of 2024, the conservation status of Castilleja chromosa has not been evaluated by NatureServe.
