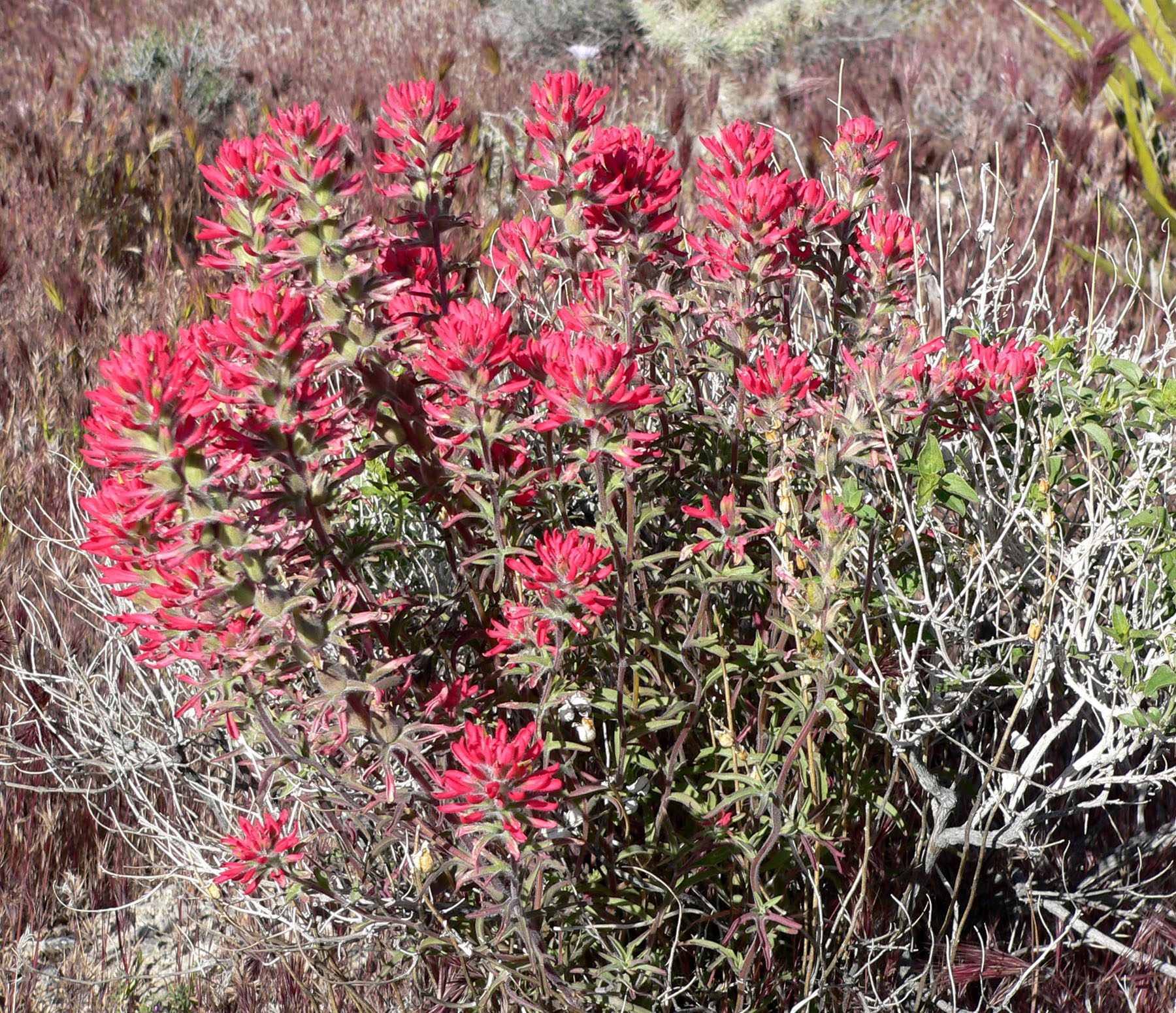

Conservation status
- Secure (NatureServe)

Scientific classification
- Kingdom: Plantae
- Clade: Tracheophytes
- Clade: Angiosperms
- Clade: Eudicots
- Clade: Asterids
- Order: Lamiales
- Family: Orobanchaceae
- Genus: Castilleja
- Species: C. angustifolia

Binomial name
- Castilleja angustifolia (Nutt.) G.Don

Varieties
- C. a. var. angustifolia; C. a. var. dubia; C. a. var. flavescens

Synonyms
- List: Castilleja bennittii; Castilleja bradburii; Castilleja buffumii; Castilleja dubia; Castilleja flavescens; Castilleja subcinerea; Euchroma angustifolia; Euchroma bradburii

= Castilleja angustifolia =

Plant species in the broomrape family

Castilleja angustifolia is a species of hemiparasitic wildflower known by the common names northwestern paintbrush and desert paintbrush. It is an herbaceous perennial native to the desert, scrublands, and woodlands of western North America. It grows in hot sandy soils and rock crevices in dry conditions.

== Description ==
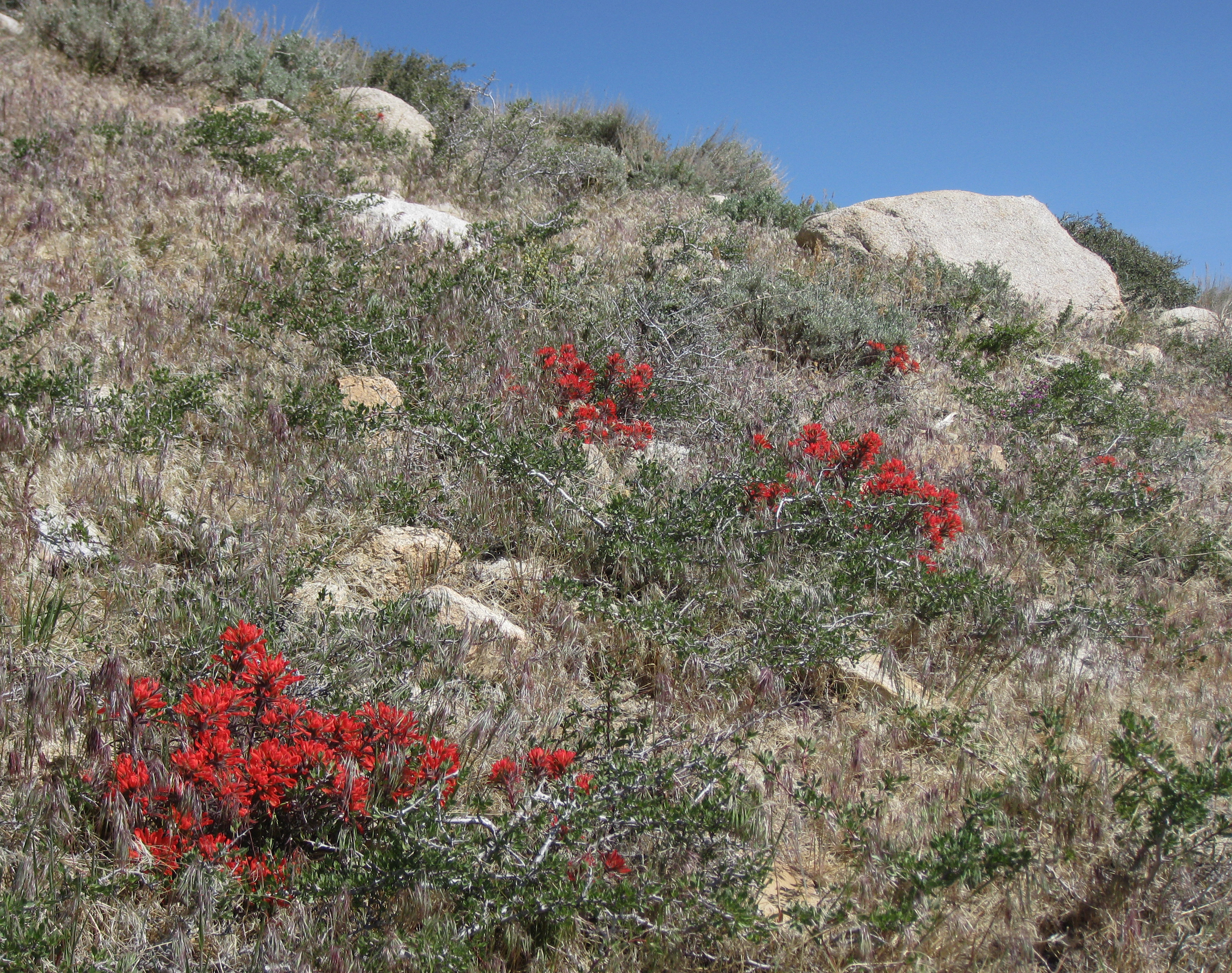
Desert paintbrush blazing up through bitterbrush on eastern Sierra Nevada hillside

This paintbrush flower is a herbacous plant that grows stems that are usually 9 to 38 centimeters (3.5–15 in) tall from a woody caudex atop a taproot. It usually has a clump of erect stems, each topped with an inflorescence of somewhat tubular yellow green flowers. The flowers are encased in bright red to orange-red bracts, sometimes tinted with purple, and usually fuzzy with a thin coat of white hairs. The upper leaves and bracts are divided into 3–5 segments, while the lower leaves are undivided, long, and narrow.

The plant flowers from May to September. In areas such as Idaho, Montana and Wyoming, it is often associated with sagebrush. The brightly colored bracts are used to attach pollinators like hummingbirds and butterflies that would otherwise ignore the plant's small yellow green flowers. The centimeter-long capsule fruits contain honeycomb-patterned seeds.

The species is similar to Castilleja linariifolia.

== Taxonomy ==
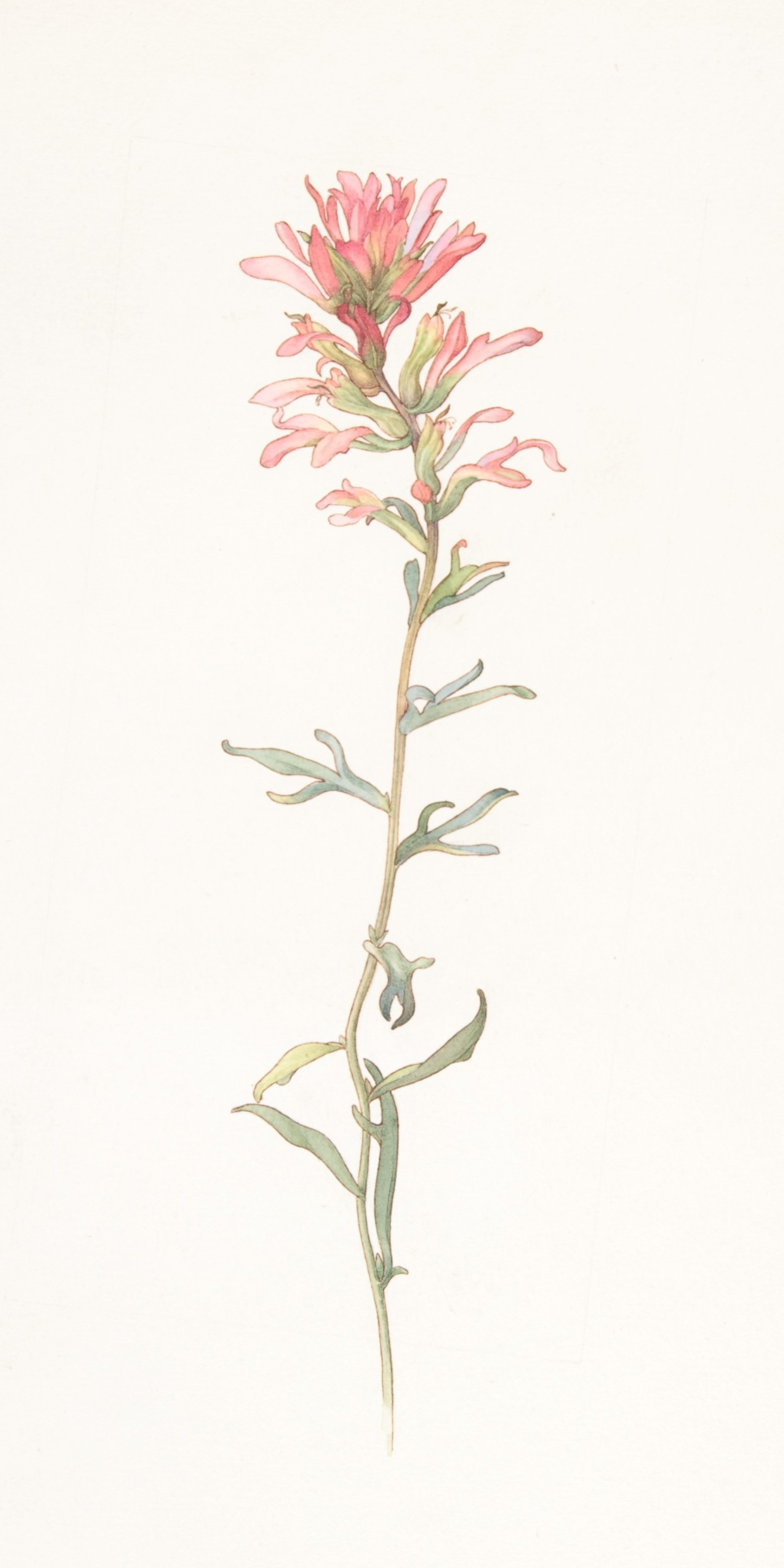
Watercolor illustration of northwestern paintbrush by Margaret Neilson Armstrong, 1913

Castilleja angustifolia was given the scientific name Euchroma angustifolia by Thomas Nuttall in 1834. Four years later in 1838 it was moved to the genus Castilleja by George Don. Together with its genus it is classified in the family Orobanchaceae. It has three accepted varieties.

- Castilleja angustifolia var. angustifolia – Northwestern US
- Castilleja angustifolia var. dubia – Rocky Mountains and South Dakota
- Castilleja angustifolia var. flavescens – Nevada, Idaho, and Utah

Castilleja angustifolia has twelve synonyms of the species or one of its varieties.

Table of Synonyms
Name	Year	Rank	Synonym of:	Notes
Castilleja angustifolia var. adenophora Fernald	1898	variety	var. angustifolia	= het.
Castilleja angustifolia subsp. bradburii (Nutt.) Piper & Beattie	1915	subspecies	var. angustifolia	= het.
Castilleja angustifolia var. bradburii (Nutt.) Fernald	1898	variety	var. angustifolia	= het.
Castilleja angustifolia var. subcinerea (Rydb.) A.Nelson & J.F.Macbr.	1916	variety	var. angustifolia	= het.
Castilleja bennittii A.Nelson & J.F.Macbr.	1913	species	var. angustifolia	= het.
Castilleja bradburii (Nutt.) G.Don	1838	species	var. angustifolia	= het.
Castilleja buffumii A.Nelson	1909	species	var. angustifolia	= het.
Castilleja dubia (A.Nelson) A.Nelson	1909	species	var. dubia	≡ hom.
Castilleja flavescens Pennell ex Edwin	1959	species	var. flavescens	≡ hom.
Castilleja subcinerea Rydb.	1913	species	var. angustifolia	= het.
Euchroma angustifolia Nutt.	1834	species	E. angustifolia	≡ hom.
Euchroma bradburii Nutt.	1834	species	var. angustifolia	= het.
Notes: ≡ homotypic synonym; = heterotypic synonym

=== Names ===
It is known by the common names narrow-leaf paintbrush or northwestern paintbrush. Castilleja angustifolia shares many names with other plant species. For example it is called narrowleaf paintbrush as is Castilleja linariifolia, it is desert paintbrush in southern California, but Castilleja chromosa is frequently known by this name, and both it and Castilleja miniata are called common paintbrush. Like other species in its genus, it is also sometimes simply called paintbrush.
