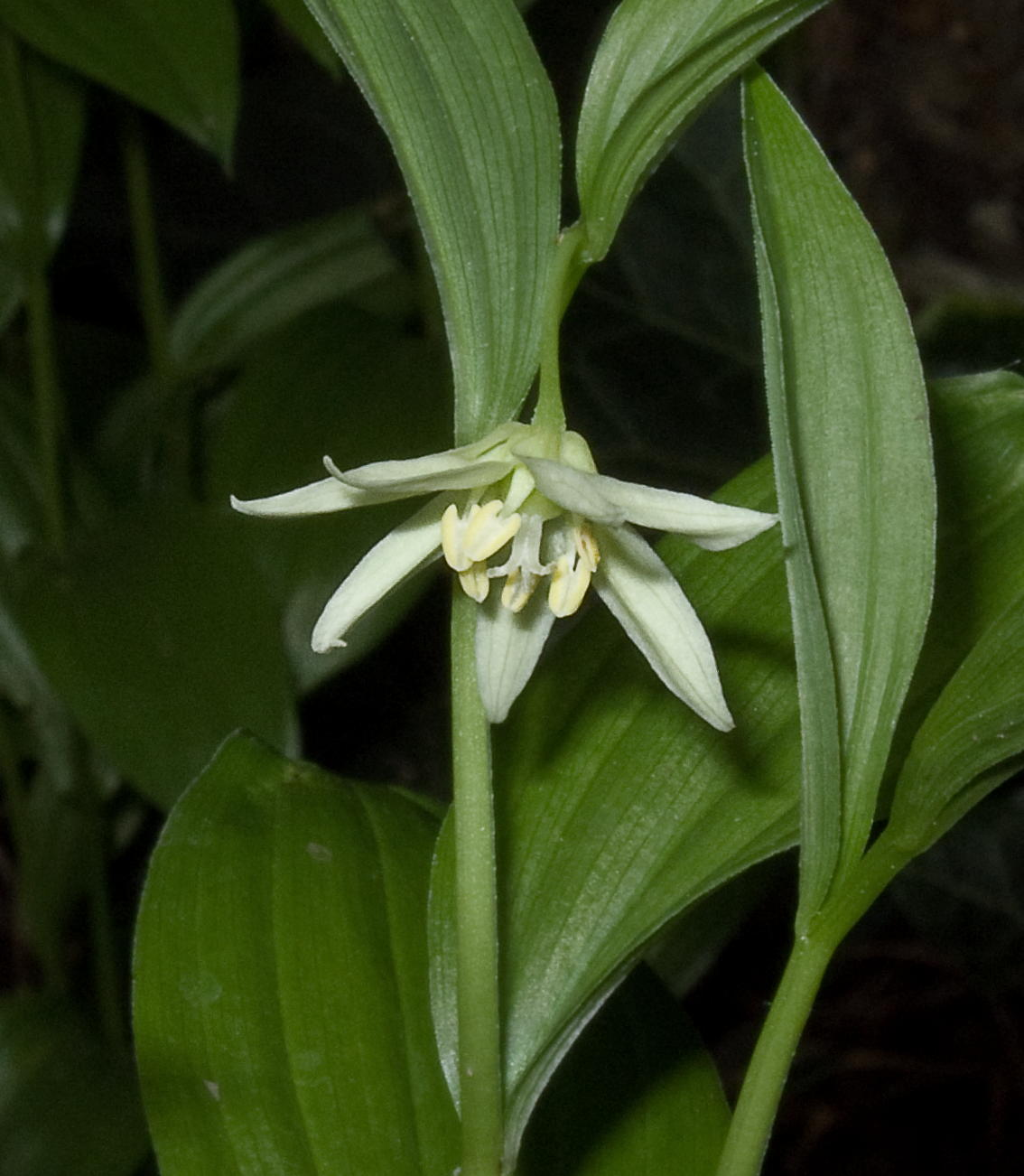
- Disporum viridescens

Scientific classification
- Kingdom: Plantae
- Clade: Embryophytes
- Clade: Tracheophytes
- Clade: Spermatophytes
- Clade: Angiosperms
- Clade: Monocots
- Order: Liliales
- Family: Colchicaceae
- Genus: Disporum; Salisb. ex D.Don

Synonyms
- Drapiezia Blume

= Disporum =

Genus of flowering plants

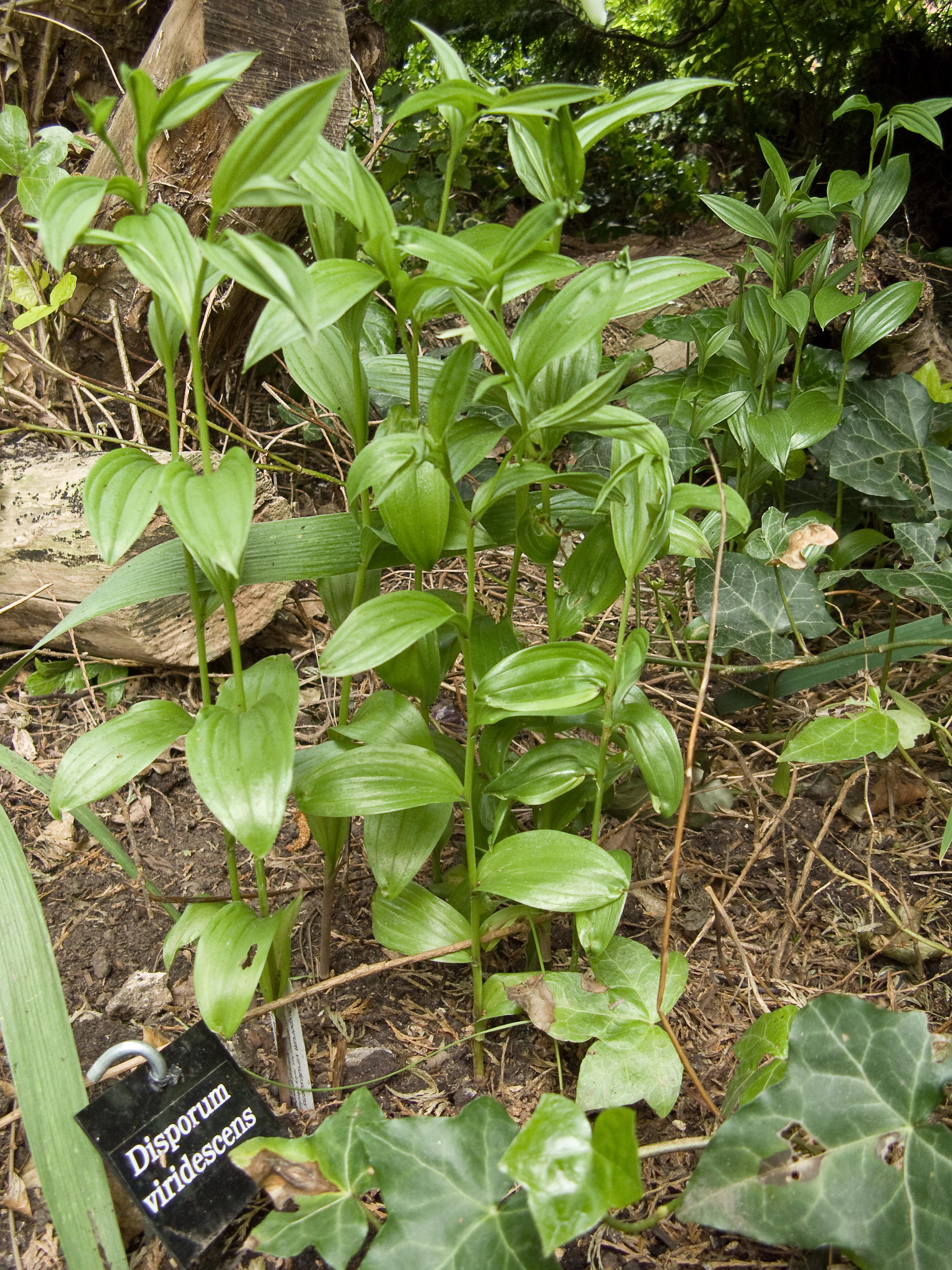
Disporum viridescens in cultivation in England

Disporum (commonly known as fairy bells) is a genus of about 20 species of perennial flowering plants, found in Asia from northern India to Japan, south to Indonesia and north into the Russian Far East.

== Taxonomy ==
Disporum pullum, from China, was first named by Salisbury in 1812, (Note: Trans. Hort. Soc. London 1: 331 (1812)) but subsequent authors places it in other genera such as Streptopus and Uvularia, till Don published the first valid description in 1825.

In the APG III classification system, it is placed in the family Colchicaceae. The genus previously included five species in North America, but these have been separated as the genus Prosartes D.Don and moved to the family Liliaceae in accordance to differences in karyology and chemistry as well as results from molecular systematic investigations. The type species is Disporum pullum Salisb., which is a synonym of Disporum cantoniense.

Species

- Disporum acuminatissimum W.L.Sha – Guangxi
- Disporum acuminatum C.H.Wright – Myanmar
- Disporum bodinieri (H.Lév. & Vaniot) F.T.Wang & Tang – Guizhou, Hunan, Sichuan, Tibet, Yunnan
- Disporum calcaratum D.Don – Yunnan, Himalayas, N Indochina
- Disporum cantoniense (Lour.) Merr. – S China, S + SE Asia
- Disporum hainanense Merr. – Guangdong, Hainan
- Disporum jinfoshanense X.Z.Li, D.M.Zhang & D.Y.Hong – Chongqing
- Disporum kawakamii Hayata – Taiwan
- Disporum leucanthum H.Hara – S China, E Himalayas
- Disporum longistylum (Chinese fairy bells) (H.Lév. & Vaniot) H.Hara – C + SW China
- Disporum lutescens Koidz. – Japan
- Disporum megalanthum F.T.Wang & Tang – C China
- Disporum nantouense S.S.Ying – Taiwan
- Disporum sessile (Japanese fairy bells) (Thunb.) D.Don – Japan, Korea, Kuril Is, Sakhalin
- Disporum shimadae Hayata – Taiwan
- Disporum smilacinum A.Gray – Japan, Korea, Kuril Is, Sakhalin, Shandong
- Disporum tonkinense Koyama – N Vietnam
- Disporum trabeculatum Gagnep. – S China, Vietnam
- Disporum uniflorum Baker ex S.Moore – China, Korea
- Disporum viridescens (Maxim.) Nakai – China, Japan, Korea, Russian Far East

Excluded species in North America

- Disporum hookeri (Torr.) G.Nicholson – now Prosartes hookeri Torr. – Hooker's fairy bells
- Disporum lanuginosum (Michx.) G.Nicholson – now Prosartes lanuginosa (Michx.) D.Don – yellow mandarin
- Disporum maculatum (Buckley) Britton – now Prosartes maculata (Buckley) A.Gray – spotted or nodding mandarin
- Disporum smithii (Hook.) Piper – now Prosartes smithii (Hook.) Utech, Shinwari & Kawano – Smith's fairy bells
- Disporum trachycarpum (S.Watson) Benth. & Hook.f. – now Prosartes trachycarpa S.Watson – rough-fruited fairy bells

== Bibliography ==
- Hara, Hiroshi (1988). "A revision of the Asiatic species of the genus Disporum (Liliaceae)". In Ōba, Hideaki; Malla, Samal B. (eds.). The Himalayan Plants. Vol. 1. University of Tokyo Press. pp. 163–209. ISBN 9780860084273.
- "World Checklist of Selected Plant Families". The Board of Trustees of the Royal Botanic Gardens, Kew.
