= Yellow mandarin =

Yellow mandarin is a common name for several plants and may refer to:

- Prosartes lanuginosa
- Prosartes maculata

== See also ==
- Amanita sinicoflava, the mandarin yellow ringless amanita
