= Prosartes parvifolia =

Siskiyou bells

Conservation status
- Imperiled (NatureServe)

Scientific classification
- Kingdom: Plantae
- Clade: Tracheophytes
- Clade: Angiosperms
- Clade: Monocots
- Order: Liliales
- Family: Liliaceae
- Genus: Prosartes
- Species: P. parvifolia

Binomial name
- Prosartes parvifolia S. Wats.

Synonyms
- Disporum hookeri var. parvifolium (S.Watson) Britton; Disporum parvifolium (S.Watson) Britton; Prosartes hookeri var. parvifolia (S.Watson) Kartesz

Species of flowering plant

Prosartes parvifolia (Siskiyou bells) is a rare plant species endemic to a small region in the Siskiyou Mountains of the United States. It is known from only 4 counties: 2 in California (Del Norte and Siskiyou) and 2 in Oregon (Curry and Josephine). The species has been considered by some authorities as part of P. hookeri but others accept Prosartes parvifolia as a separate species.

Prosartes parvifolia is a rather stout plant with densely hairy ovate leaves. It can be distinguished from P. hookeri because P. parvifolia has single-locule ovaries and anthers much longer than the filaments.
