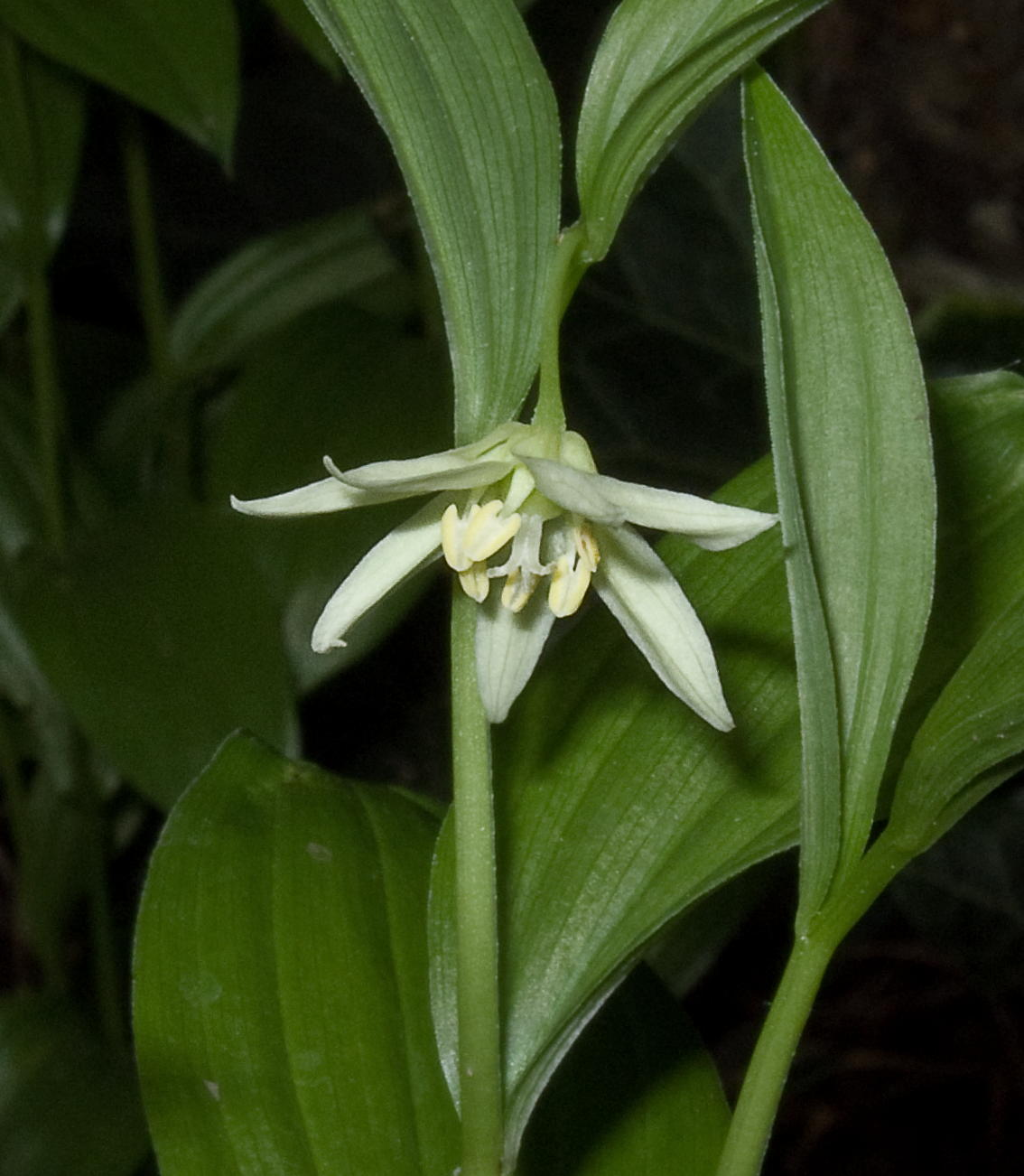

Scientific classification
- Kingdom: Plantae
- Clade: Tracheophytes
- Clade: Angiosperms
- Clade: Monocots
- Order: Liliales
- Family: Colchicaceae
- Genus: Disporum
- Species: D. viridescens

Binomial name
- Disporum viridescens (Maxim.) Nakai

Synonyms
- Homotypic Synonyms: Disporum smilacinum var. viridescens (Maxim.) Maxim.; Uvularia viridescens Maxim.; Prosartes viridescens (Maxim.) Regel

= Disporum viridescens =

Species of flowering plant

Disporum viridescens is a species of flowering plant in the family Colchicaceae. Like other species in the genus, it grows from a rhizome. The plant is 30 to 80 cm (12 to 31 in), with a stem that may branch. The leaves are more-or-less ovate in shape with a very short petiole (stalk). One or two open flowers are borne at the ends of stems; they have greenish white tepals which are 1.5 to 2 cm (0.59 to 0.79 in) long. Flowering is in late spring to early summer (May to June in the northern hemisphere). Black berries around 1 cm (0.39 in) in diameter appear a few months later.

Plants grow in woodland or on grassy slopes at altitudes up to 600 m (2,000 ft) in northeastern China, eastern Russia, Japan, and Korea.

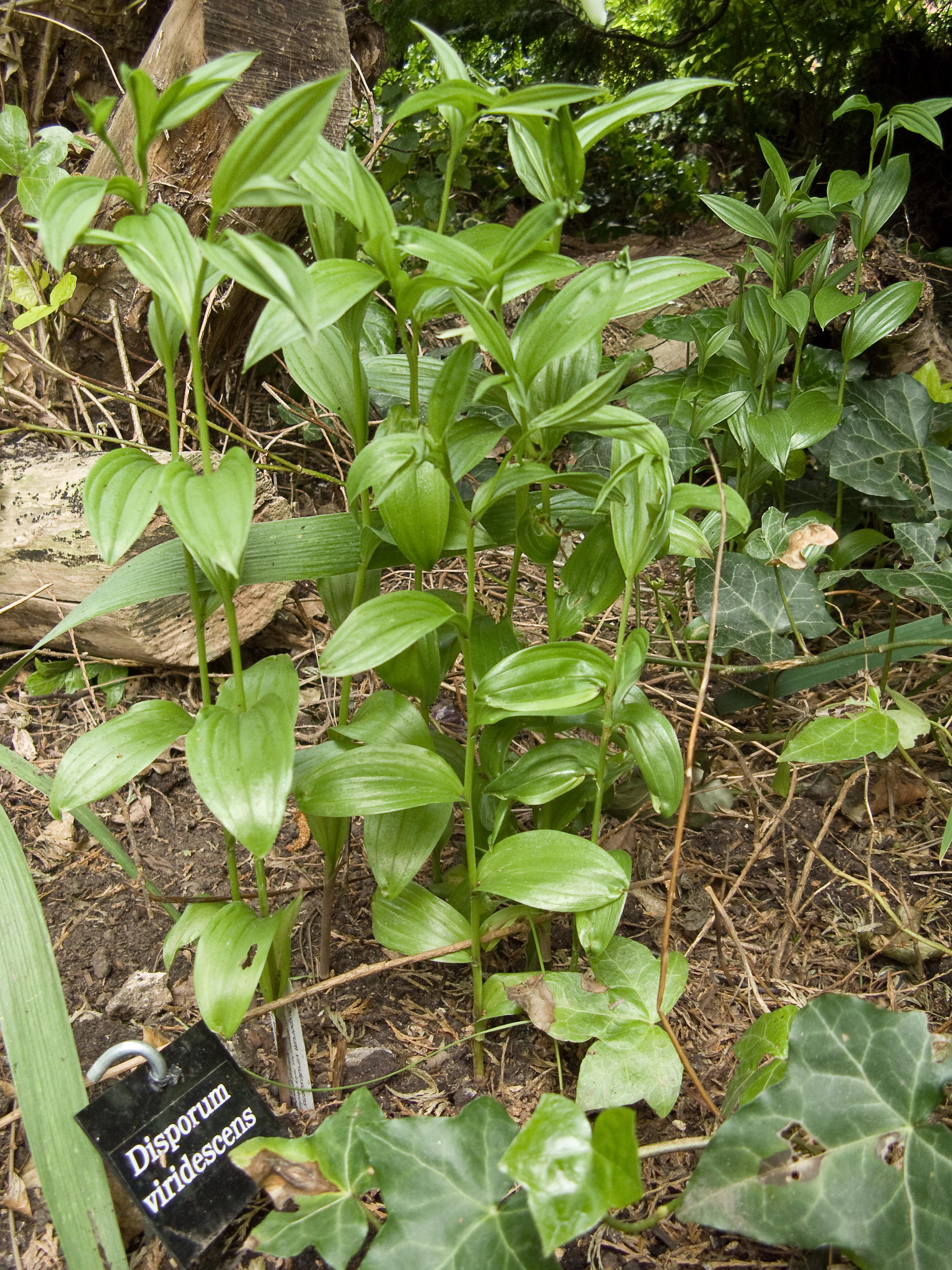
Plant growing in cultivation near Sutton Coldfield, England

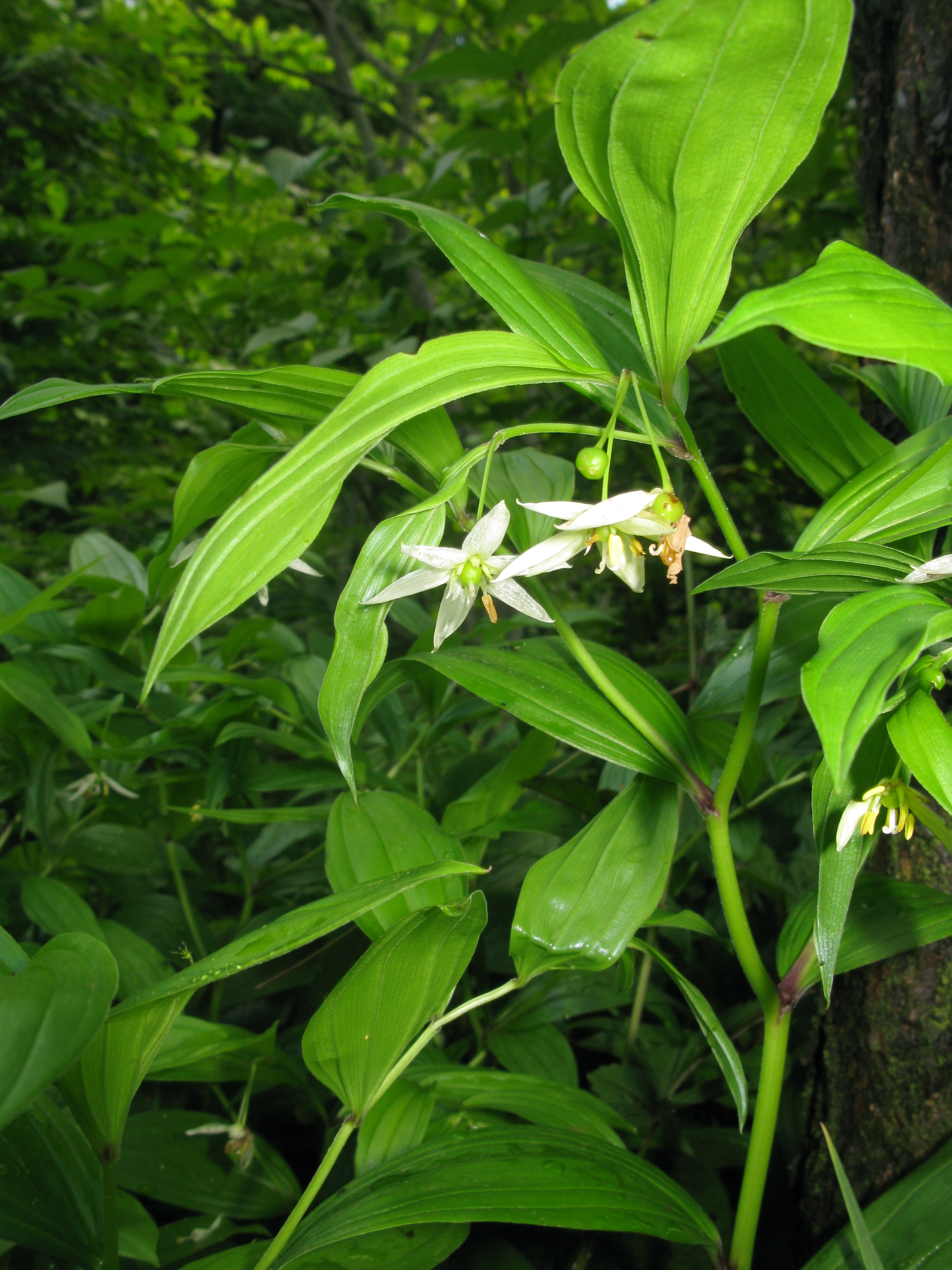
Plant in Chōfu city wild grass garden, Tokyo, Japan
