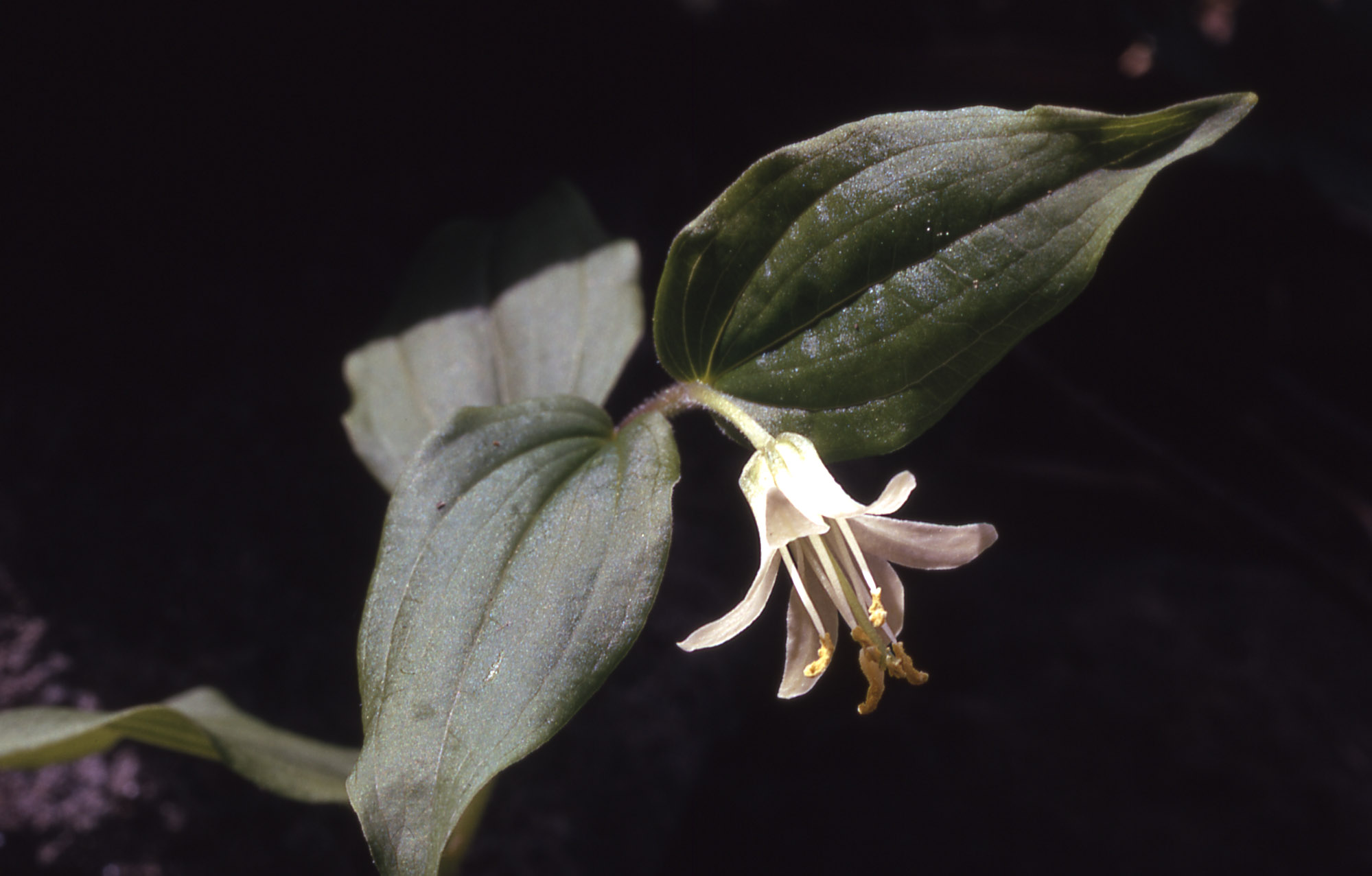
- Prosartes trachycarpa

Scientific classification
- Kingdom: Plantae
- Clade: Tracheophytes
- Clade: Angiosperms
- Clade: Monocots
- Order: Liliales
- Family: Liliaceae
- Subfamily: Streptopoideae
- Genus: Prosartes; D.Don

Synonyms
- Lethea Noronha; Disporum sect. Prosartes (D. Don) Q. Jones

= Prosartes =

Genus of flowering plants

Prosartes, the fairybells, is a North American genus of flowering plants in the lily family.

For several decades plants of this genus were considered part of the otherwise Asian genus Disporum. Studies of morphology and cytology, as well as genetic analysis, show these North American plants to be different from the Asian species, and in 1995 the two groups began to be recognized as distinct genera. Prosartes included five species until 2010, when a sixth, Prosartes parvifolia, long considered a variant of Prosartes hookeri, or perhaps a hybrid, was acknowledged as a distinct species.

These plants are rhizomatous herbs with bell-like pendent (hanging) flowers.

Species

- Prosartes hookeri - drops of gold - California and Pacific Northwest, plus isolated populations in Black Hills and in the Upper Peninsula of Michigan
- Prosartes lanuginosa - yellow mandarin or fairybells - Appalachians, Ozarks, Ontario
- Prosartes maculata - spotted mandarin - southern Appalachians
- Prosartes parvifolia - Siskiyou bells - southwestern Oregon, northwestern California
- Prosartes smithii - largeflower fairybells - West Coast from Vancouver Island to San Francisco Bay
- Prosartes trachycarpa - roughfruit fairybells - western United States, central + western Canada
