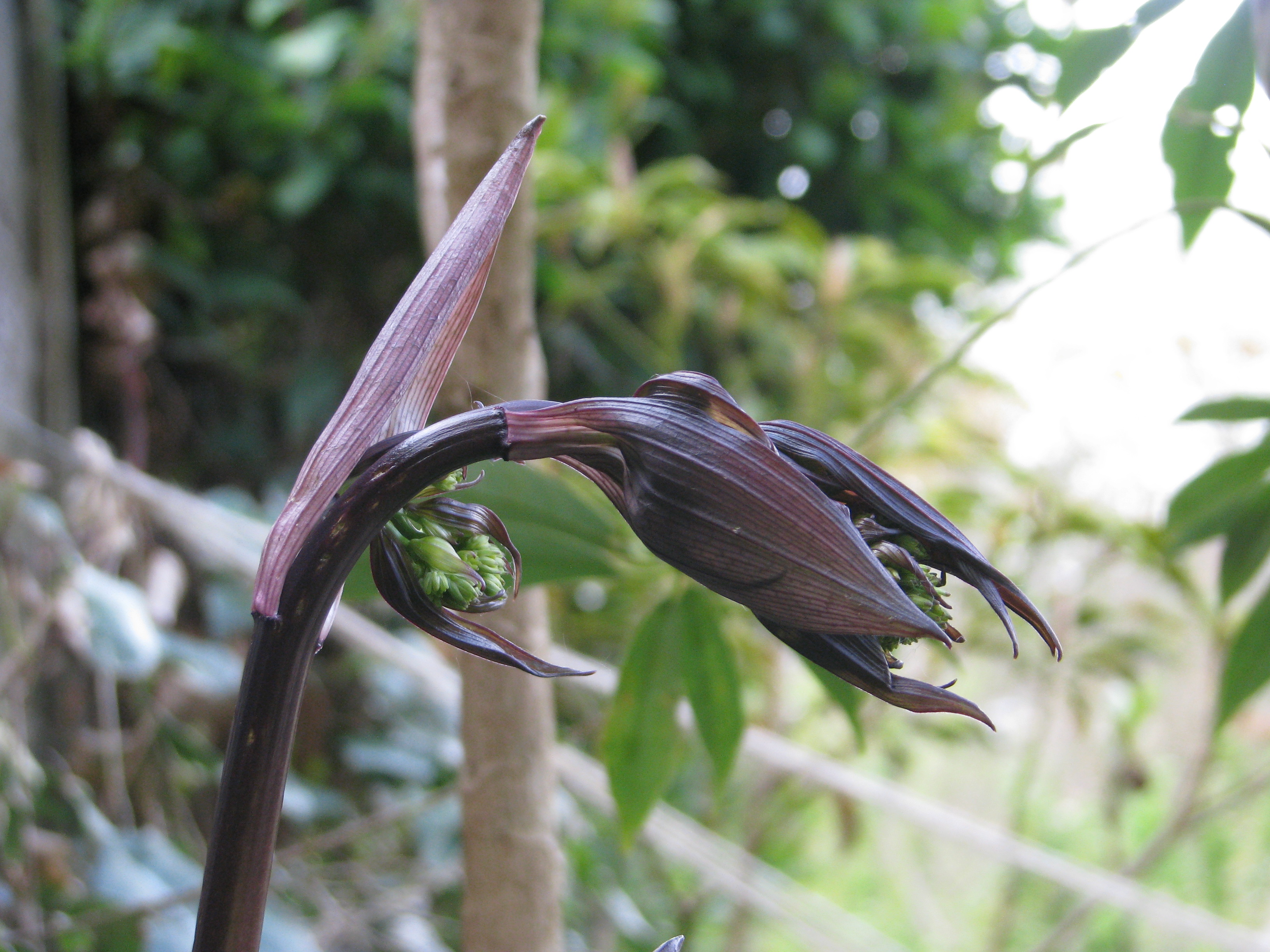
- Disporum longistylum 'Night Heron' cultivar

Scientific classification
- Kingdom: Plantae
- Clade: Embryophytes
- Clade: Tracheophytes
- Clade: Spermatophytes
- Clade: Angiosperms
- Clade: Monocots
- Order: Liliales
- Family: Colchicaceae
- Genus: Disporum
- Species: D. longistylum

Binomial name
- Disporum longistylum (H.Lév. & Vaniot) H.Hara

Synonyms
- Disporum cavaleriei H.Lév.; Tovaria longistyla H.Lév. & Vaniot

= Disporum longistylum =

Species of flowering plant

Disporum longistylum, called the long-styled disporum, is a species of flowering plant in the fairy bells genus Disporum, native to Assam, Tibet, and central China. Its cultivar 'Night Heron' has gained the Royal Horticultural Society's Award of Garden Merit.
