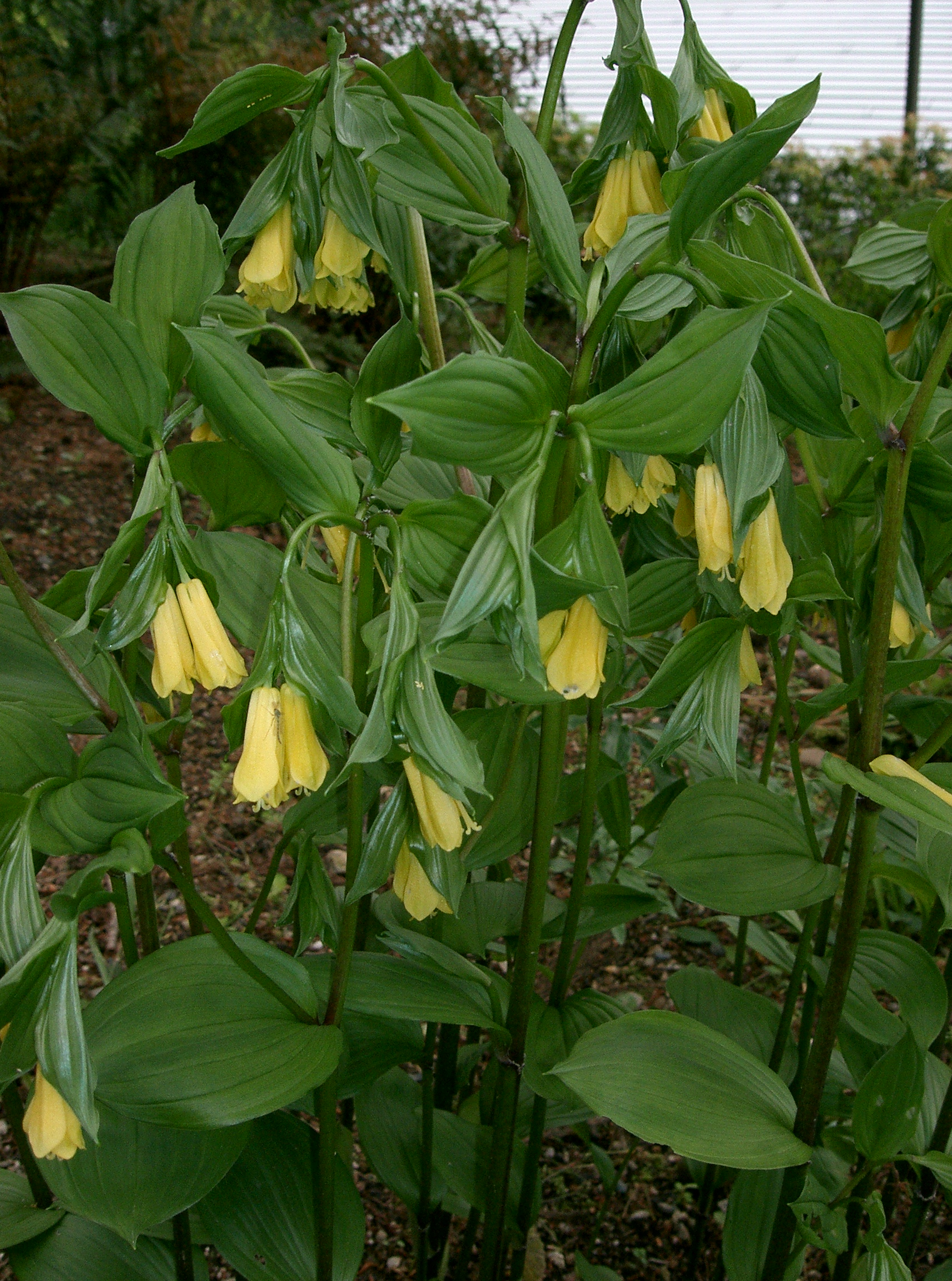

Scientific classification
- Kingdom: Plantae
- Clade: Embryophytes
- Clade: Tracheophytes
- Clade: Spermatophytes
- Clade: Angiosperms
- Clade: Monocots
- Order: Liliales
- Family: Colchicaceae
- Genus: Disporum
- Species: D. uniflorum

Binomial name
- Disporum uniflorum Baker, J. Bot.

Synonyms
- Disporum flavens Kitag. Disporum sessile ssp. flavens (Kitag.) Kitag. Disporum sessile var. flavens (Kitag.) H.S.Kim; Disporum sessile var. pachyrrhizum Hand.-Mazz.

= Disporum uniflorum =

Species of plant

Disporum uniflorum, commonly known as yellow fairy bells, is a species of perennial herb in the genus Disporum. It is native to Korea.

== Description ==
It is 30-50 cm tall, with a short rhizome and a root that spreads sideways, and its large branches spring out from the top. Its leaves are opposite and has a long, oval shape, 5-18 cm in length and 3-6 cm wide, with a pointed tip and a round bottom, with 3-5 veins and no petiole. From April to June, its flowers bloom in gold and white, and 1-3 flowers hang down from the tip as the stem bends. For the flower, it is 2-2.5 cm long, with a tubular perianth. The perianth has 6 leaflets, spatulate and tubular. There are 6 stamens and 1 pistil, and the fruit is a berry, about 1 cm in diameter, and turns black when ripe.

== Distribution ==
It is distributed in Korea and China. It can be found in mountain forests in the central and southern parts of the Korea peninsula, but not Ulleungdo and Jeju Island.

In China, it can be found in the provinces of Liaoning, Hebei, Henan, Shandong, Anhui, Jiangsu, Zhejiang, Jiangxi, Hubei, Shaanxi and Sichuan.

== Usage ==
In Korea, the plant is called yunpannamul (윤판나물). Because the shape of the flowers resembled botak (보탁; 寶鐸), a large wind chime hung on the corners of a temple, the plant is also called botakcho (보탁초; 寶鐸草). Its young shoots, harvested before the flowers bloom, are eaten as vegetable dishes called namul, while its roots and rhizomes are used in traditional Korean medicine to treat coughing and indigestion as well as the lungs. Besides that, it is planted for ornamental purposes.
