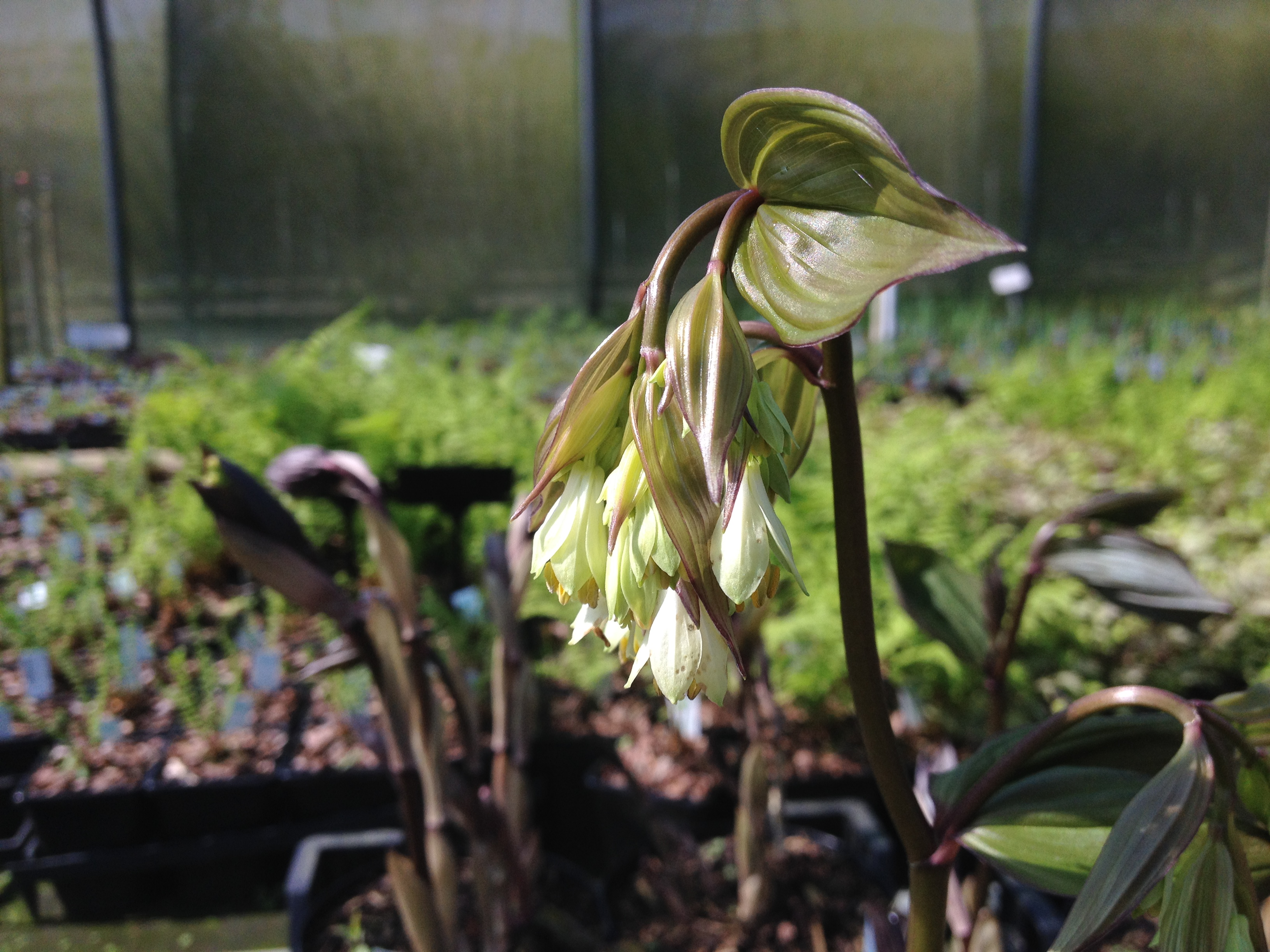

Scientific classification
- Kingdom: Plantae
- Clade: Tracheophytes
- Clade: Angiosperms
- Clade: Monocots
- Order: Liliales
- Family: Colchicaceae
- Genus: Disporum
- Species: D. megalanthum

Binomial name
- Disporum megalanthum F.T.Wang & Tang

= Disporum megalanthum =

Species of flowering plant

Disporum megalanthum is a deciduous rhizomatous perennial plant in the family Colchicaceae.

== Description ==
- Height: Reaches up to 60 cm at maturity.
- Leaves: Leaves are deciduous. When present, they are glossy, bright green, and alternately arranged.
- Stems: Arching stems.
- Flowers: Nodding, bell-shaped white to creamy white flowers are borne in spring and summer.
- Fruit: Fruits are present in autumn, and are blue-black in colour.

== Range and distribution ==
Native to central China.

== Habitat and cultivation ==
A woodland plant, D. megalanthum prefers a cool, partially shaded area with rich, neutral to acidic soil.

Best propagated by seed or from cuttings. Protect young growth from terrestrial molluscs, such as slugs and snails.
