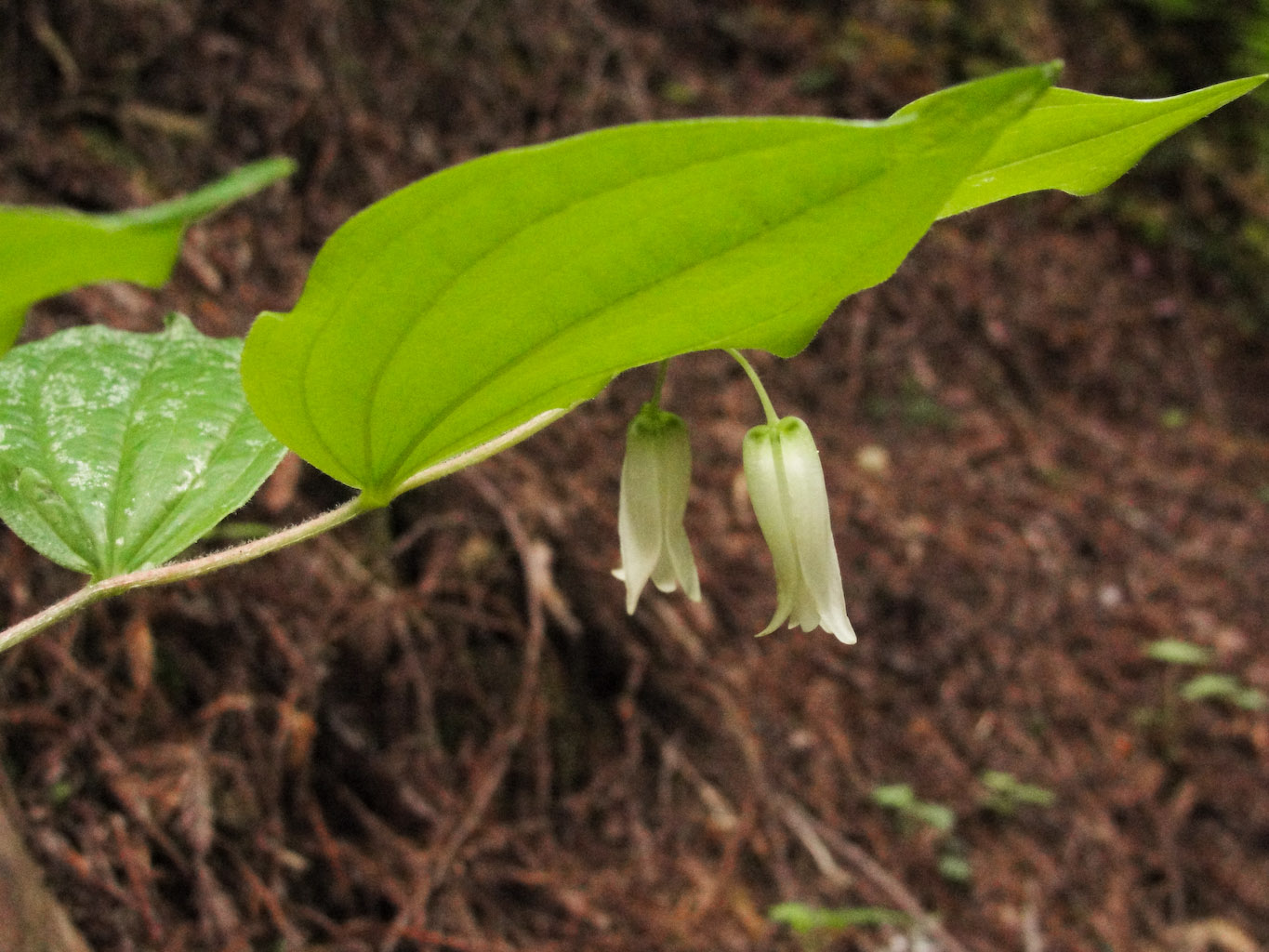
- Prairie Creek Redwoods State Park, California

Scientific classification
- Kingdom: Plantae
- Clade: Tracheophytes
- Clade: Angiosperms
- Clade: Monocots
- Order: Liliales
- Family: Liliaceae
- Genus: Prosartes
- Species: P. smithii

Binomial name
- Prosartes smithii (Hook.) Utech, Shinwari & Kawano

Synonyms
- Disporum smithii (Hook.) Piper; Uvularia smithii Hook.; Uvularia puberula Sm. 1818, illegitimate homonym not Michx. 1803; Prosartes menziesii D.Don; Disporum menziesii (D.Don) G.Nicholson

= Prosartes smithii =

Species of flowering plant

Prosartes smithii is a North American species of flowering plants known by the common name largeflower fairybells. It is native to western North America from Vancouver Island in British Columbia south as far as Monterey County in California. It grows in shady forest and woodland, including redwood forests.

Prosartes smithii is an erect, branching perennial herb growing up to 1 m (3.3 ft) tall. Its narrow, fuzzy stems bear wide, oval-shaped, pointed leaves up to 12 cm (4.7 in) long and mostly hairless. The inflorescence produces up to seven drooping, hanging flowers which may be hidden in the cover of the large leaves. The flower is cylindrical to bell-shaped with six white to green-tinged tepals each up to 3 cm (1.2 in) long. The fruit is an oval-shaped orange or red berry just over 1 cm (0.4 in) long.

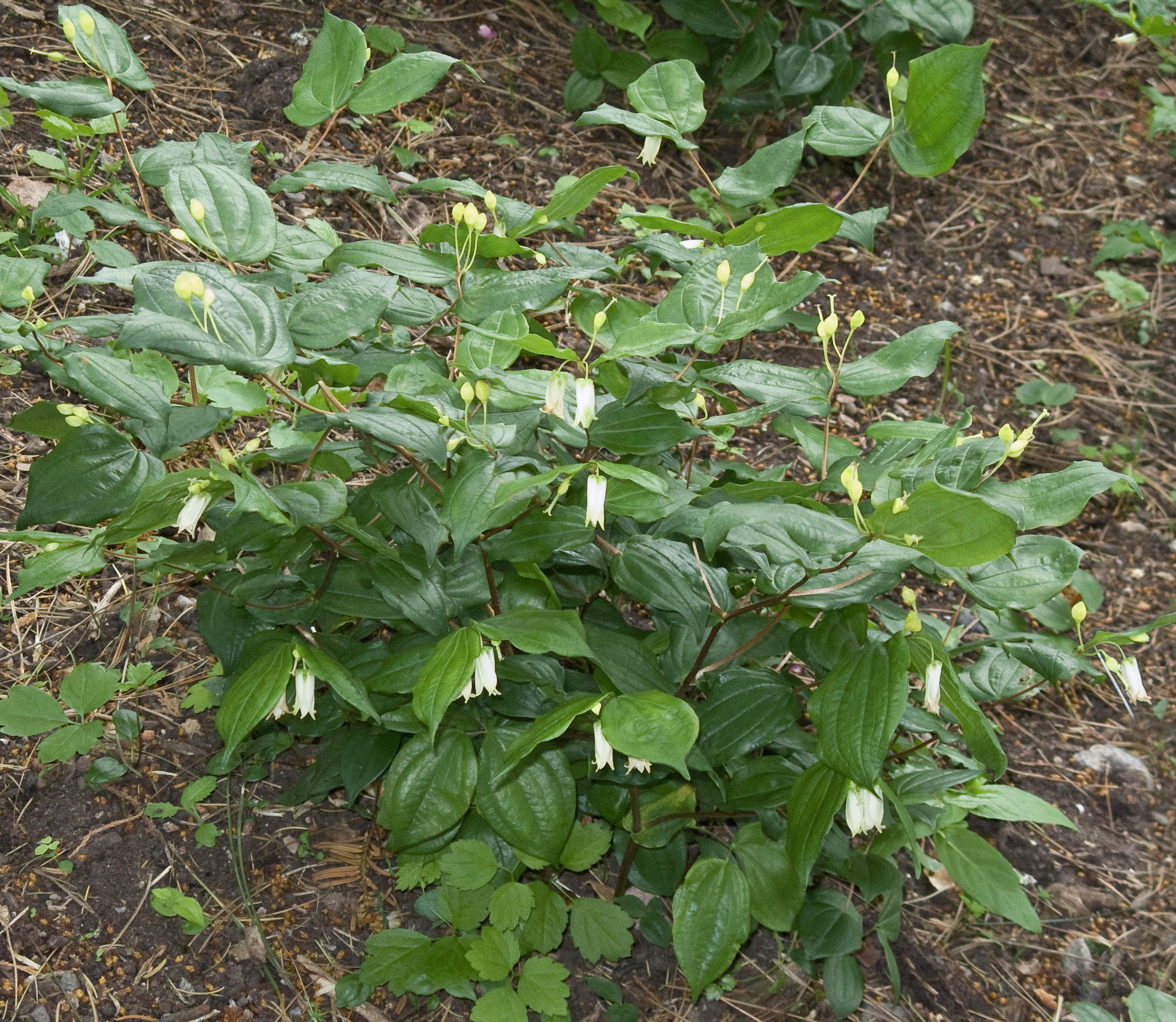
Birmingham Botanical Gardens (United Kingdom)
