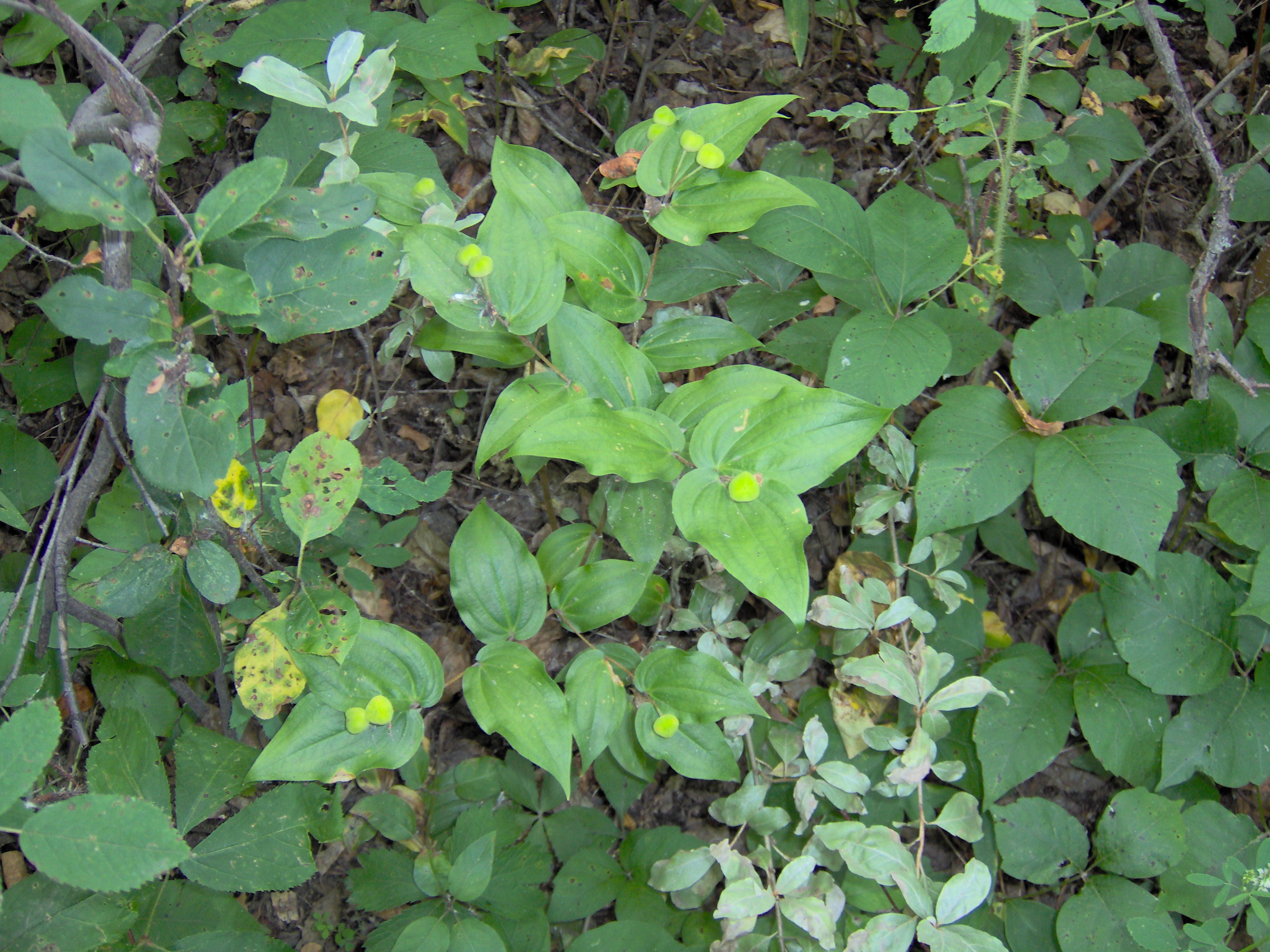

Conservation status
- Secure (NatureServe)

Scientific classification
- Kingdom: Plantae
- Clade: Embryophytes
- Clade: Tracheophytes
- Clade: Spermatophytes
- Clade: Angiosperms
- Clade: Monocots
- Order: Liliales
- Family: Liliaceae
- Genus: Prosartes
- Species: P. trachycarpa

Binomial name
- Prosartes trachycarpa S.Watson

Synonyms
- Disporum canadense Shafer; Disporum majus (Hook.) Britton; Disporum trachycarpum (S.Watson) Benth. & Hook.f.; Lethea trachycarpa (S.Watson) Farw.; Uvularia lanuginosa var. major Hook.

= Prosartes trachycarpa =

Roughfruit fairybells

Plant species in the lily family

Prosartes trachycarpa, the roughfruit fairybells, rough-fruited fairybells or rough-fruited mandarin, is a North American species of plants in the lily family. The species is widespread, known from British Columbia to Ontario and south to Arizona and New Mexico. One isolated population was reported from Isle Royale in Lake Superior.

== Description ==
This herbaceous perennial is 30 centimeters (12 in) to 80 centimeters (31 in) in height. The stems are only sparingly branched and have a softly fuzzy texture when young and become smooth or nearly so with age. The leaves are alternate and are about 4 centimeters (1.6 in) to 12 centimeters (4.7 in) long.

The flowers are delicate and hang down from the stem tips, each flower has four pedals. The berry is larger than a Saskatoon, pincherry or chokecherry, about the size of a grocery store cherry or small grape. The rough-fruited fairybell can be found in the same locale as other native fruits such as Saskatoons and chokecherries. Berries begin yellow, then orange and when fully ripe are red, often with all three colors on the same raceme. Typically 2—3 berries grow on each stem tip. The surface of the fruit feels fuzzy and velvety. The berries are edible, but bland.

The species is listed amongst plants found in the Prince Albert National Park and Riding Mountain National Park and are considered a common range plant of northern Saskatchewan.

== Uses ==
The berries have historically been eaten by Blackfeet Native Americans.

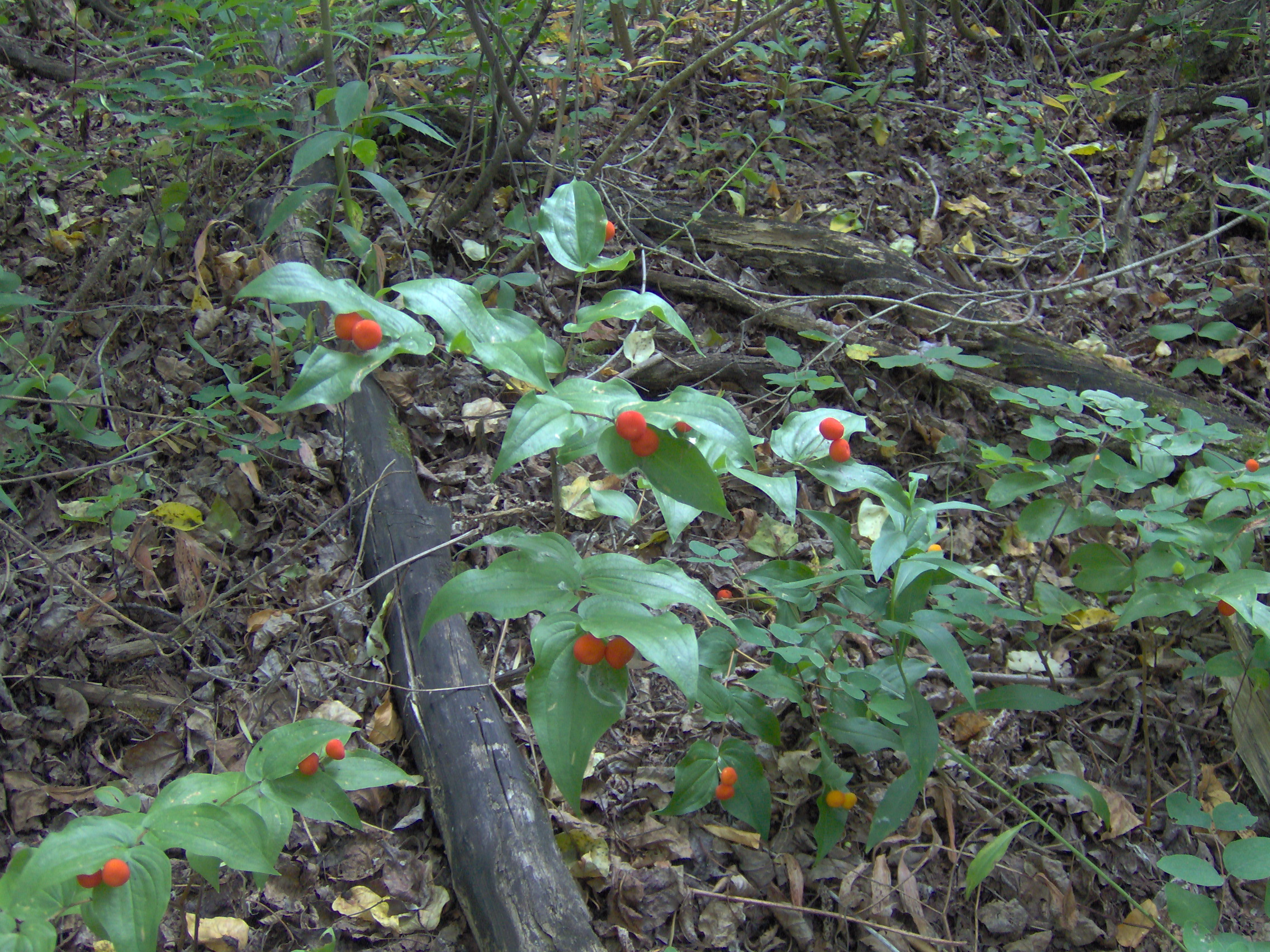
Saskatchewan rough fruited fairy bells

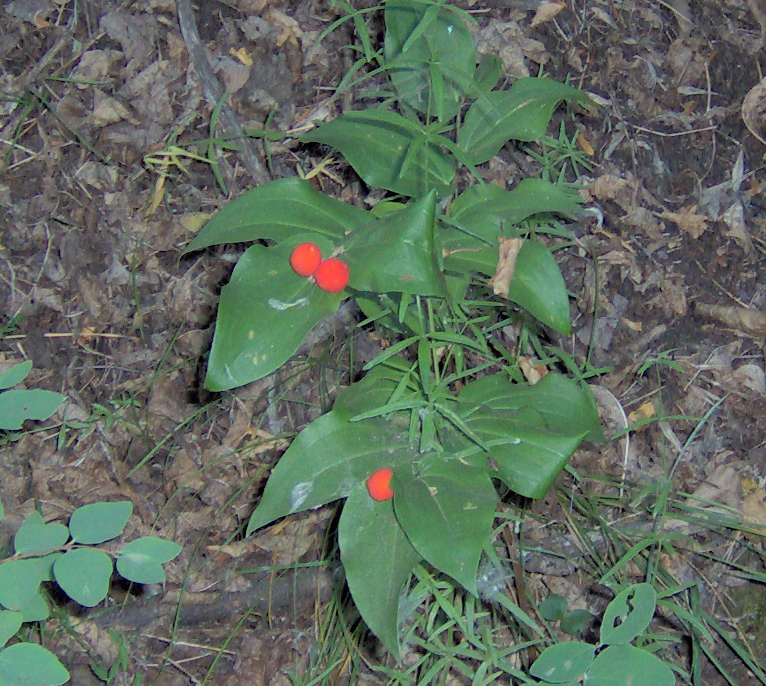
Fairy bells
