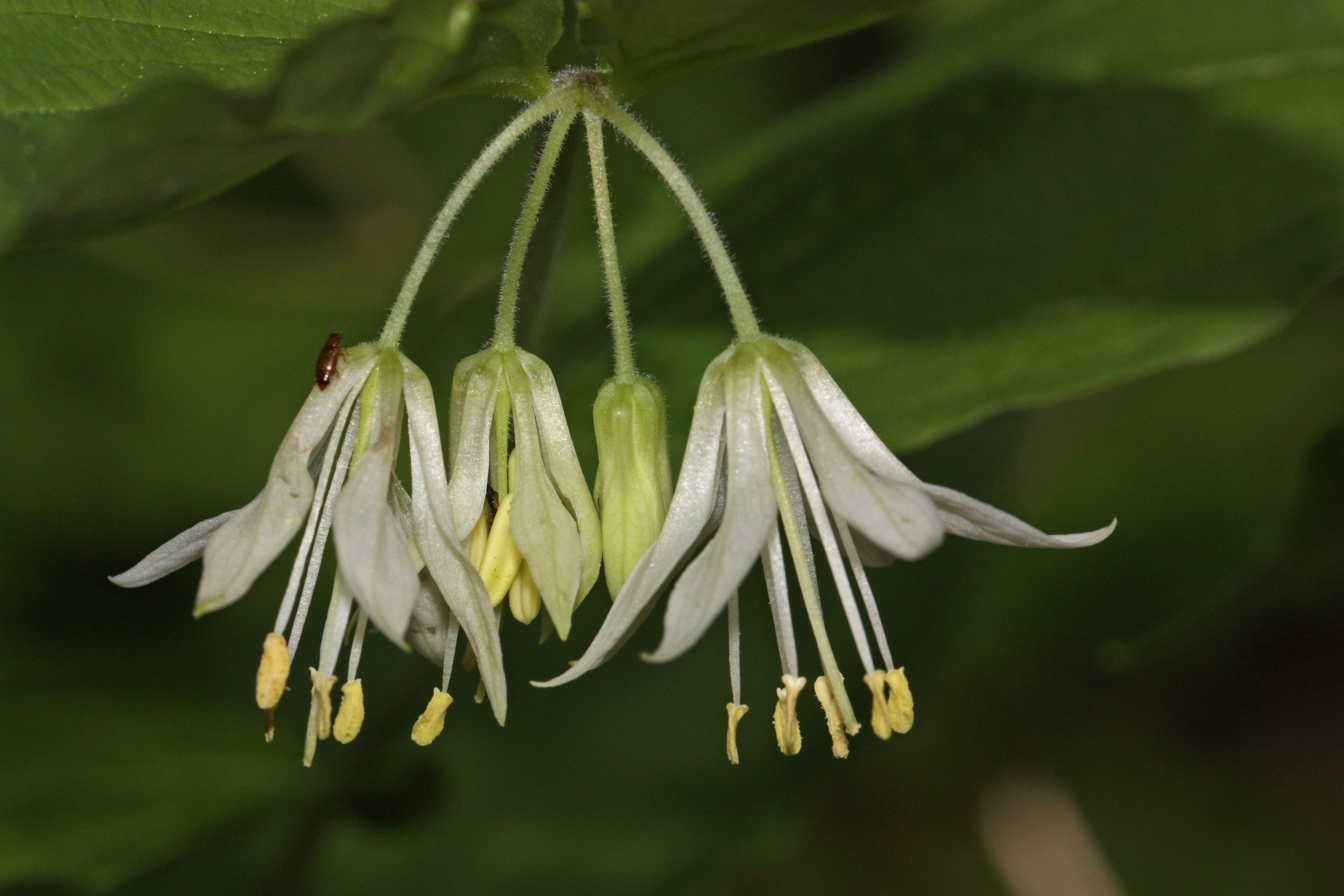
- John B. Yeon State Park, Oregon

Scientific classification
- Kingdom: Plantae
- Clade: Tracheophytes
- Clade: Angiosperms
- Clade: Monocots
- Order: Liliales
- Family: Liliaceae
- Genus: Prosartes
- Species: P. hookeri

Binomial name
- Prosartes hookeri Torr.

Synonyms
- Disporum hookeri (Torr.) G.Nicholson; Prosartes trachyandra Torr.; Prosartes oregana S.Watson; Disporum trachyandrum (Torr.) Britton; Disporum oreganum (S.Watson) Howell; Lethea oregana (S.Watson) Farw.

= Prosartes hookeri =

Species of flowering plant

Prosartes hookeri is a North American species of flowering plants in the lily family known by the common names drops of gold and Hooker's fairy bells.

== Distribution ==
It is native to western North America from Alberta and British Columbia to California to Montana, where it usually grows in shady, damp areas, such as forest understory. Additional populations have been found in the Black Hills of Wyoming and South Dakota as well as in the Porcupine Mountains in Michigan. A typical west coast habitat is in forest floors of California oak woodlands, where common understory flora associates may include Coastal woodfern, Dryopteris arguta; Maidenhair fern, Adiantum jordanii and False Solomon's seal, Maianthemum racemosum.

== Description ==
It is an erect, few-branched perennial herb growing up to a meter tall from a rhizome. Its narrow, fuzzy stems bear wide, oval-shaped, pointed leaves up to 15 centimeters long and hairless to hairy, often with hairs along the edges and on the veins underneath. The inflorescence at the tips of branches produce one to three drooping, hanging flowers which may be hidden in the cover of the large leaves. The flower is bell-shaped with six white to green veiny tepals and six protruding stamens with large anthers. The fruit is an orange to bright red berry just under a centimeter wide.

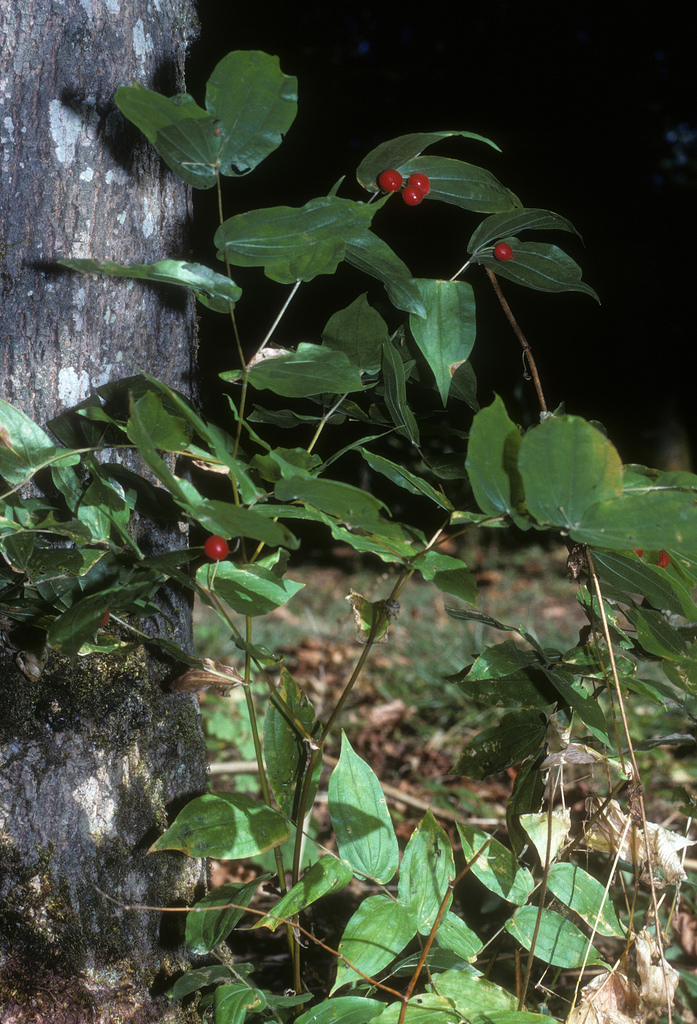
The fruit is an orange to bright red berry.
