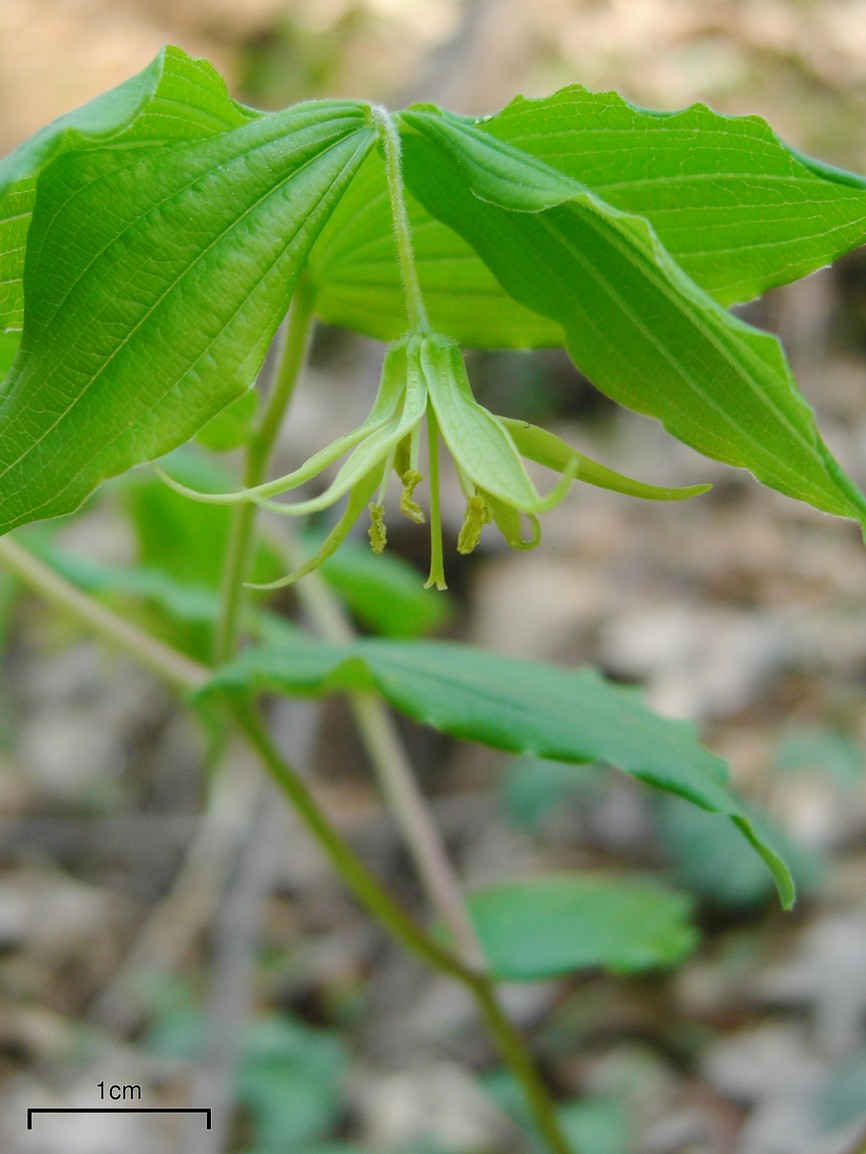

Conservation status
- Secure (NatureServe)

Scientific classification
- Kingdom: Plantae
- Clade: Tracheophytes
- Clade: Angiosperms
- Clade: Monocots
- Order: Liliales
- Family: Liliaceae
- Genus: Prosartes
- Species: P. lanuginosa

Binomial name
- Prosartes lanuginosa (Michx.) D.Don

Synonyms
- Disporum lanuginosum (Michx.) G.Nicholson; Streptopus lanuginosus Michx.; Uvularia lanuginosa (Michx.) Pers.

= Prosartes lanuginosa =

Yellow mandarin

Species of flowering plant

Prosartes lanuginosa is a North American plant species in the lily family with the common names yellow mandarin or yellow fairybells.

Prosartes lanuginosa is native to the Great Smoky Mountains and occurs in many other parts of the Appalachian region from New York to Alabama. Isolated populations occur outside Appalachia, as in the Ozarks of northern Arkansas and in southwestern Ontario.
