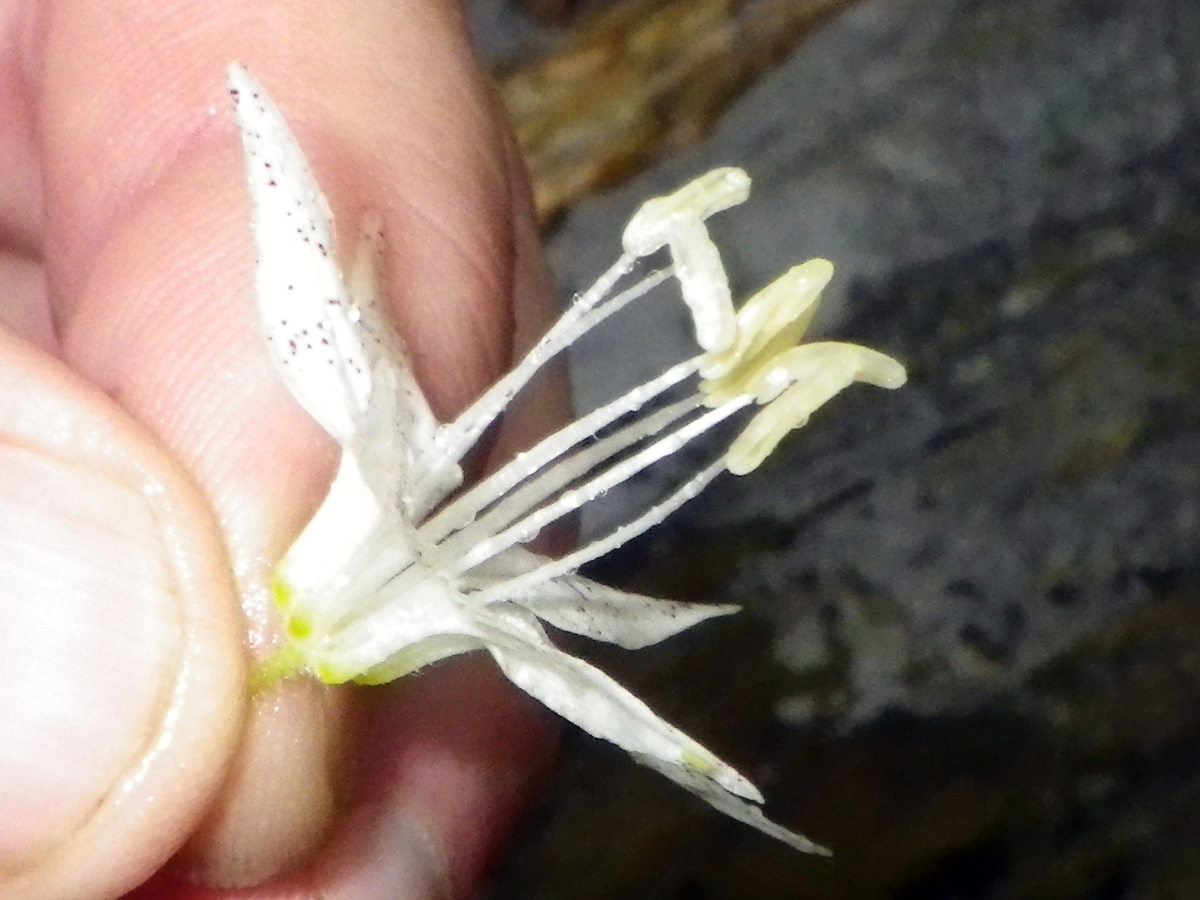

Conservation status
- Vulnerable (NatureServe)

Scientific classification
- Kingdom: Plantae
- Clade: Tracheophytes
- Clade: Angiosperms
- Clade: Monocots
- Order: Liliales
- Family: Liliaceae
- Genus: Prosartes
- Species: P. maculata

Binomial name
- Prosartes maculata (Buckley) A. Gray

Synonyms
- Streptopus maculatus Buckley; Disporum maculatum (Buckley) Britton; Lethea cahnae Farw.; Disporum cahnae Farw.; Disporum schaffneri Moldenke

= Prosartes maculata =

Species of flowering plant

Prosartes maculata is a North American species of plants in the lily family with the common names yellow mandarin, spotted mandarin, or nodding mandarin. It is a perennial plant that flowers in the spring.

It is a native plant of the Great Smoky Mountains and occurs in other parts of the Appalachian region from northern Georgia and northeastern Alabama to southern West Virginia and southern Ohio. There are old reports of isolated populations from near Detroit, Michigan, but these appear now to have been lost to urban development.

Prosartes maculata is a herb that grows up to 80 cm tall. Its flowers are bell-shaped, nodding (hanging downward), cream-colored with purple spots.
