= List of Cuscuta species =

The genus Cuscuta contains over 200 species. This list includes the 220 species accepted by Plants of the World Online. It also lists Cuscuta polygonorum Engelm., which is accepted by Flora of North America but considered a variety of Cuscuta pentagoma by Plants of the World Online.

== Cuscuta species ==
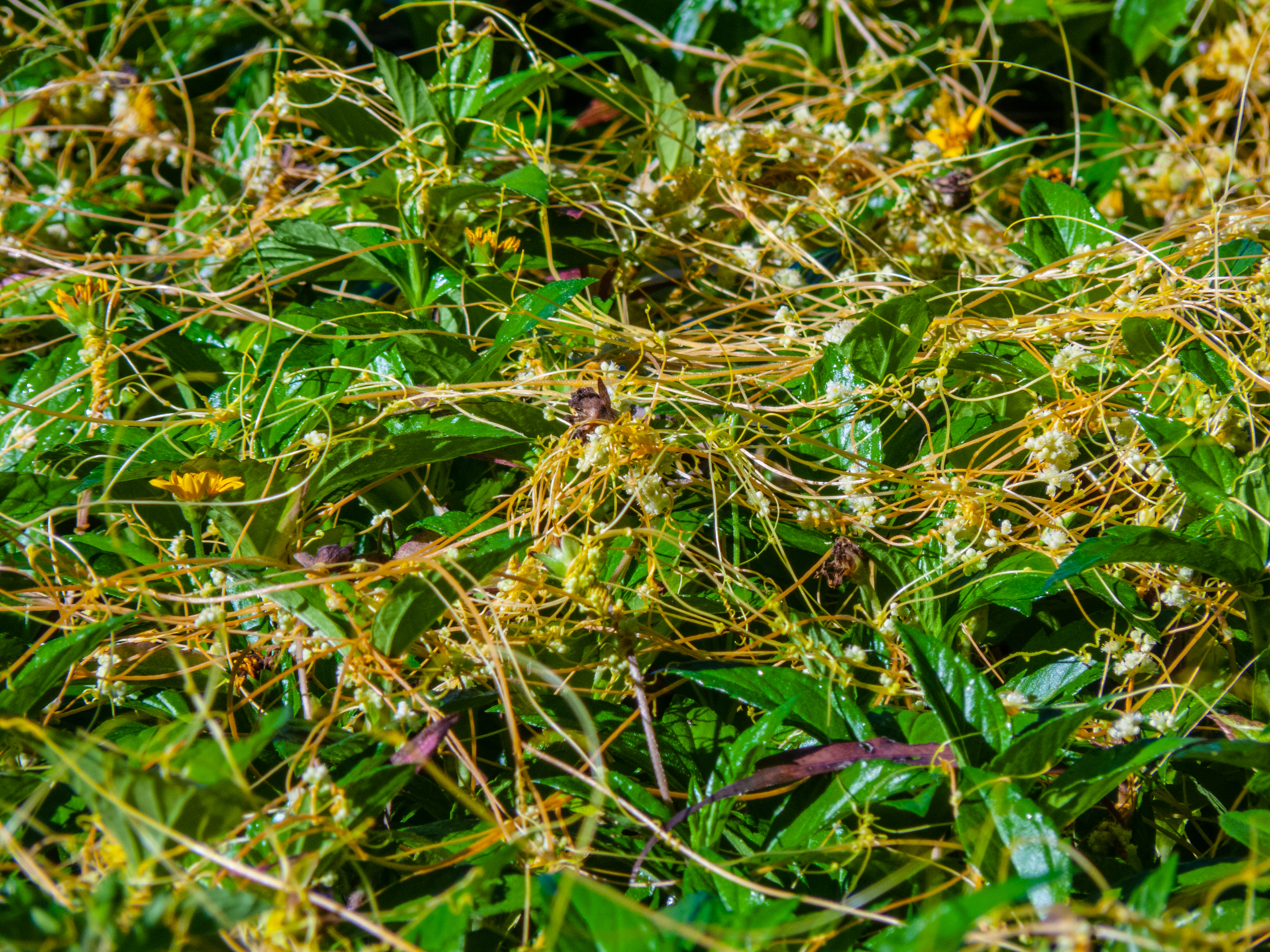
Cuscuta australis

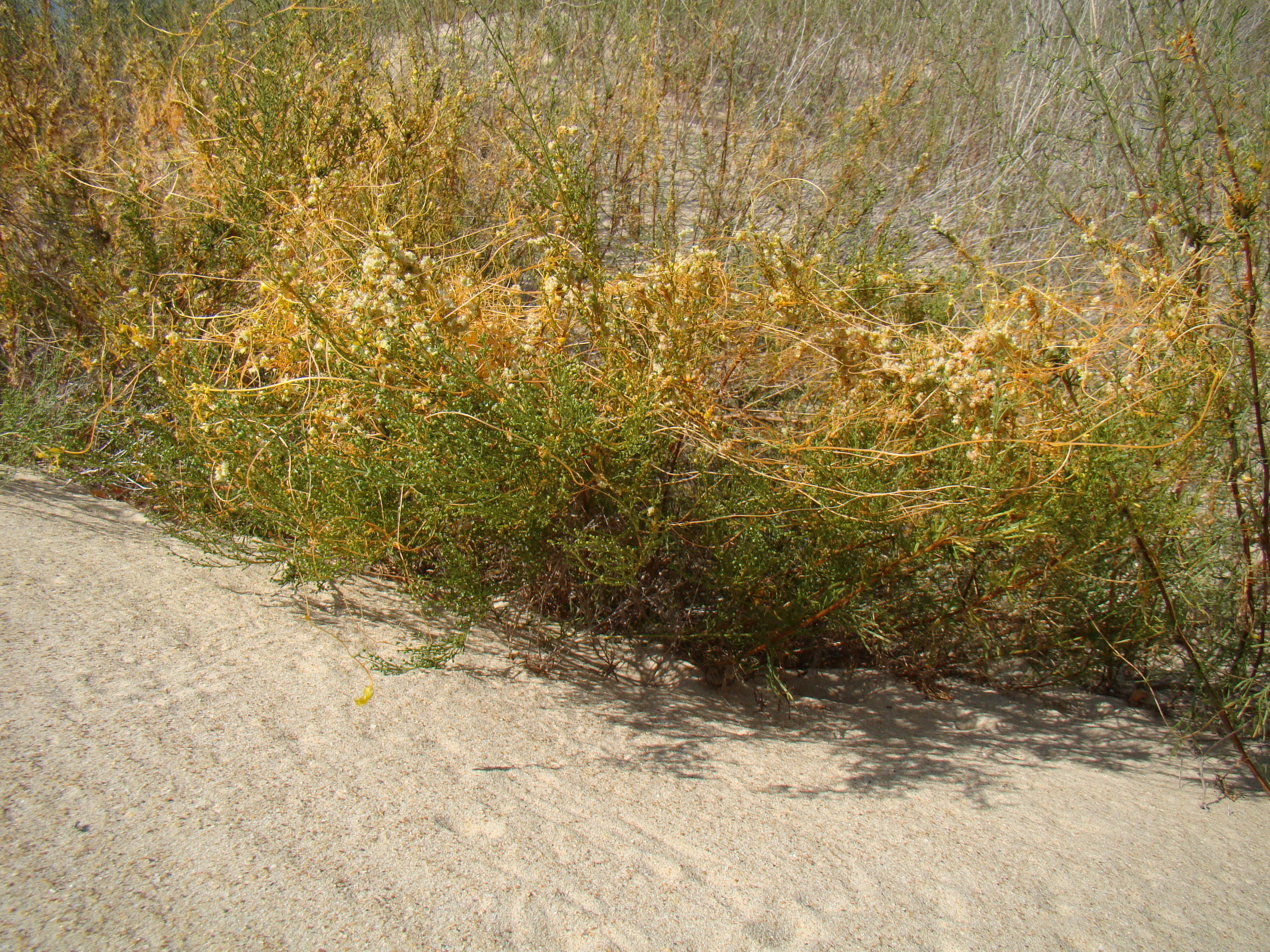
Cuscuta campestris

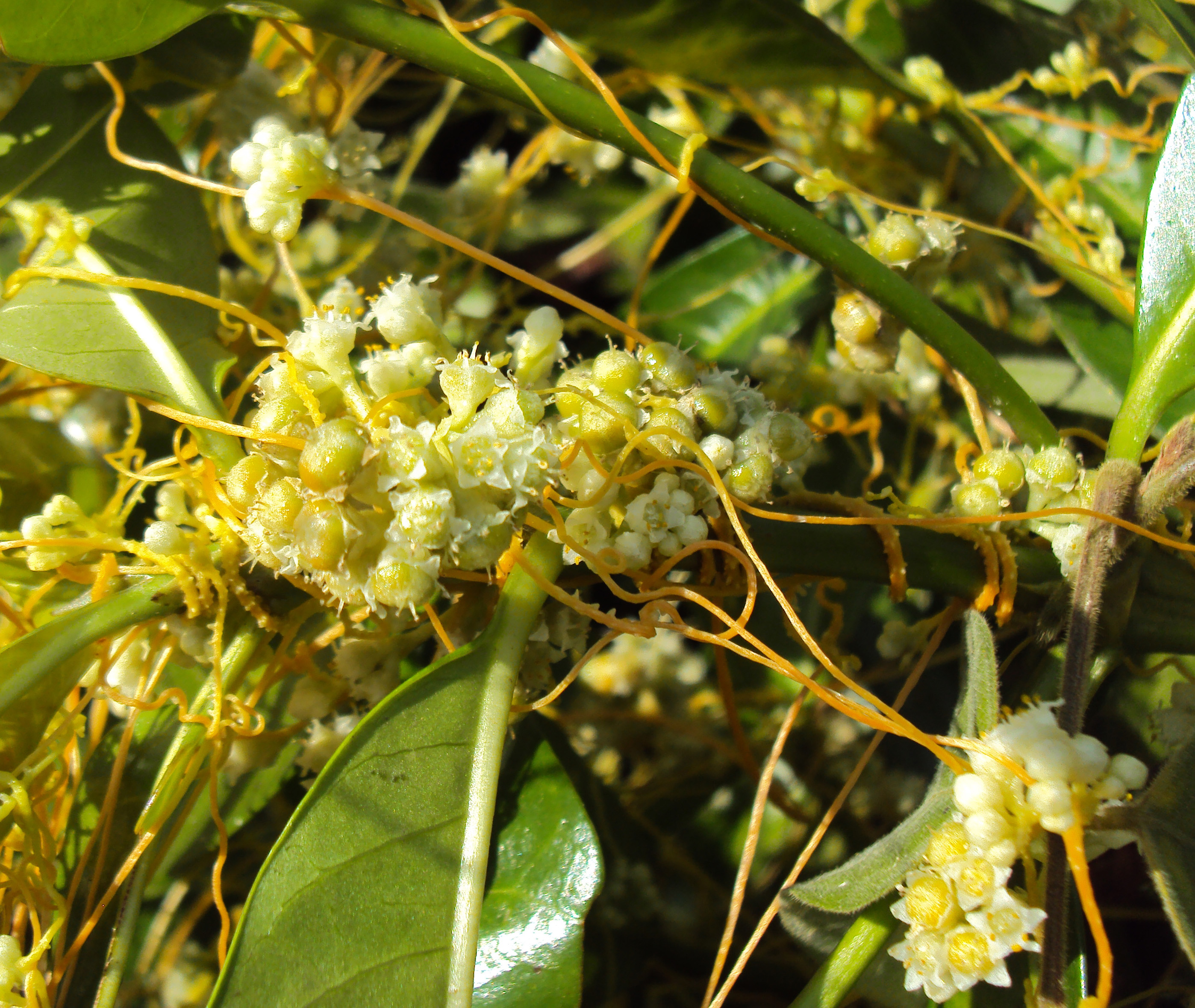
Cuscuta chinensis

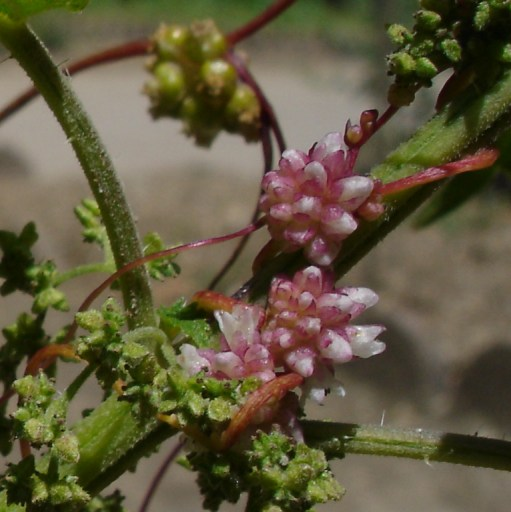
Cuscuta europaea

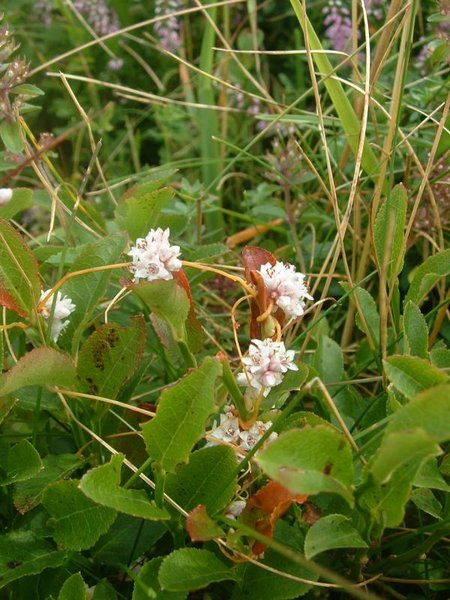
Cuscuta epithymum

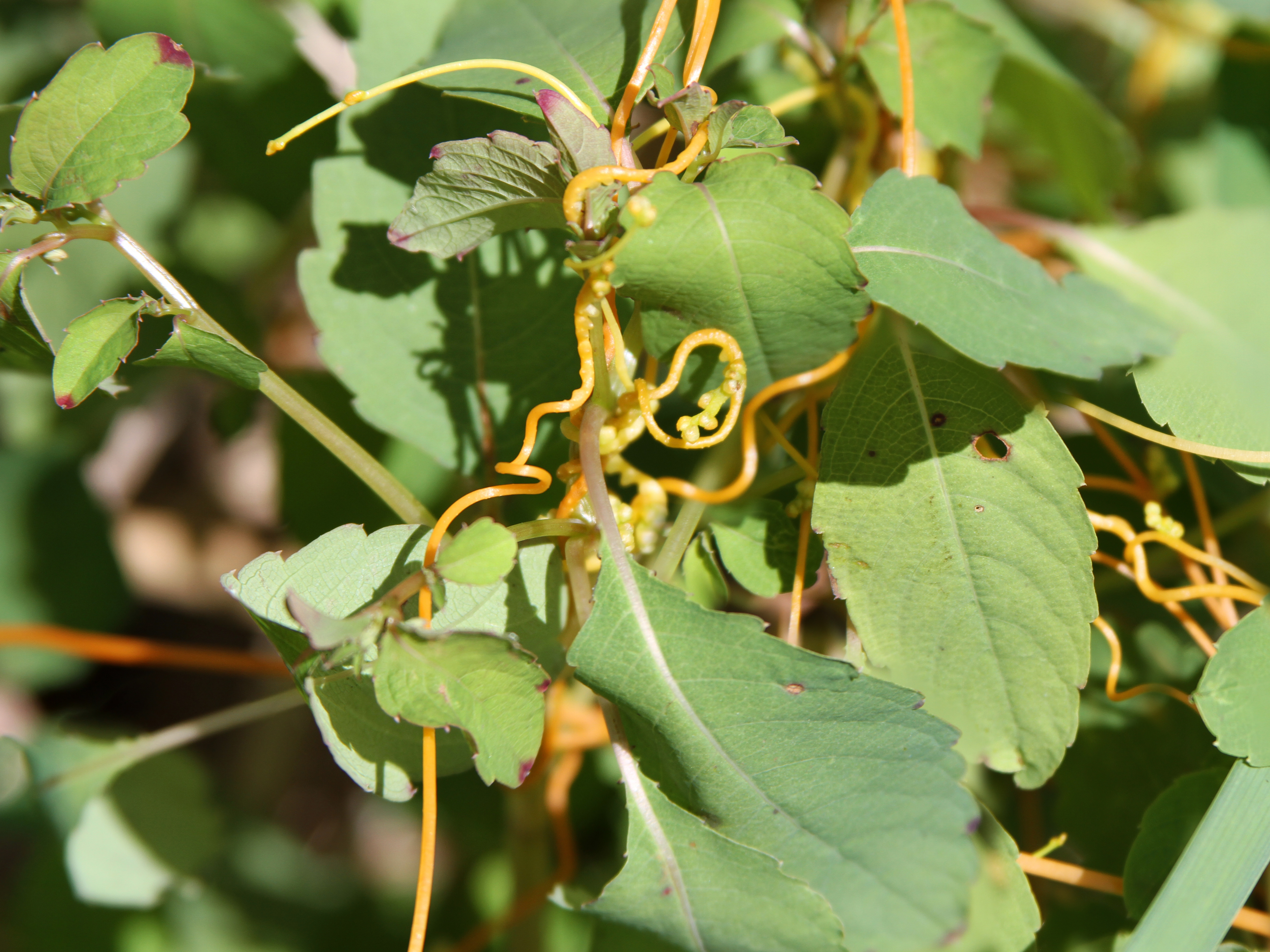
Cuscuta gronovii

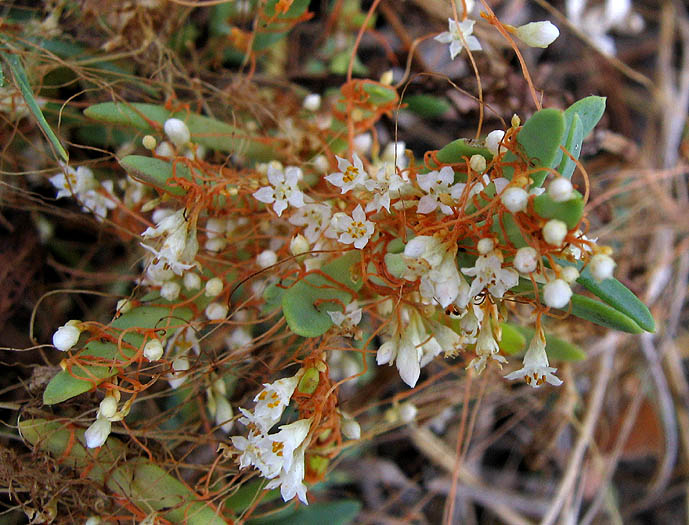
Cuscuta pacifica

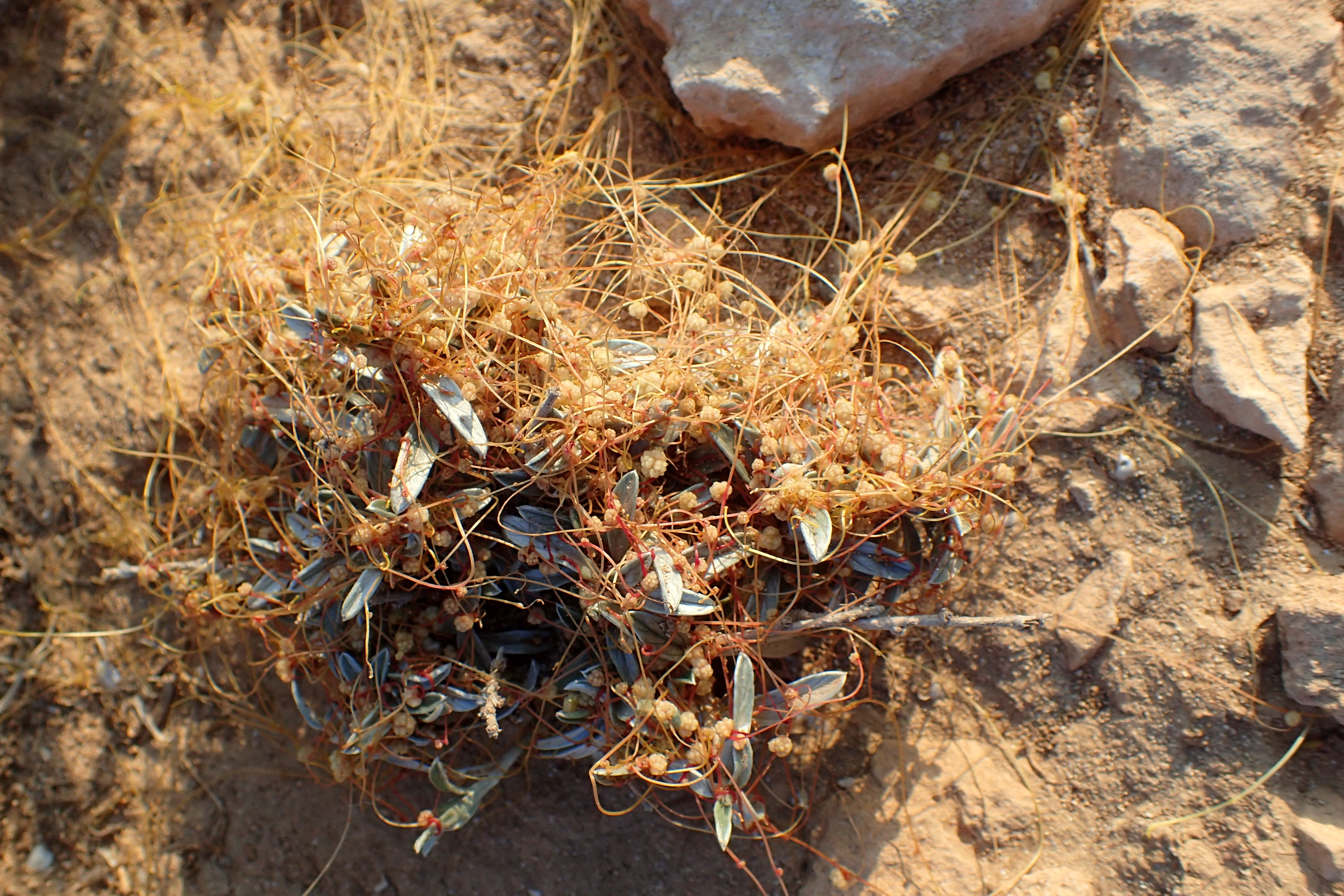
Cuscuta palaestina

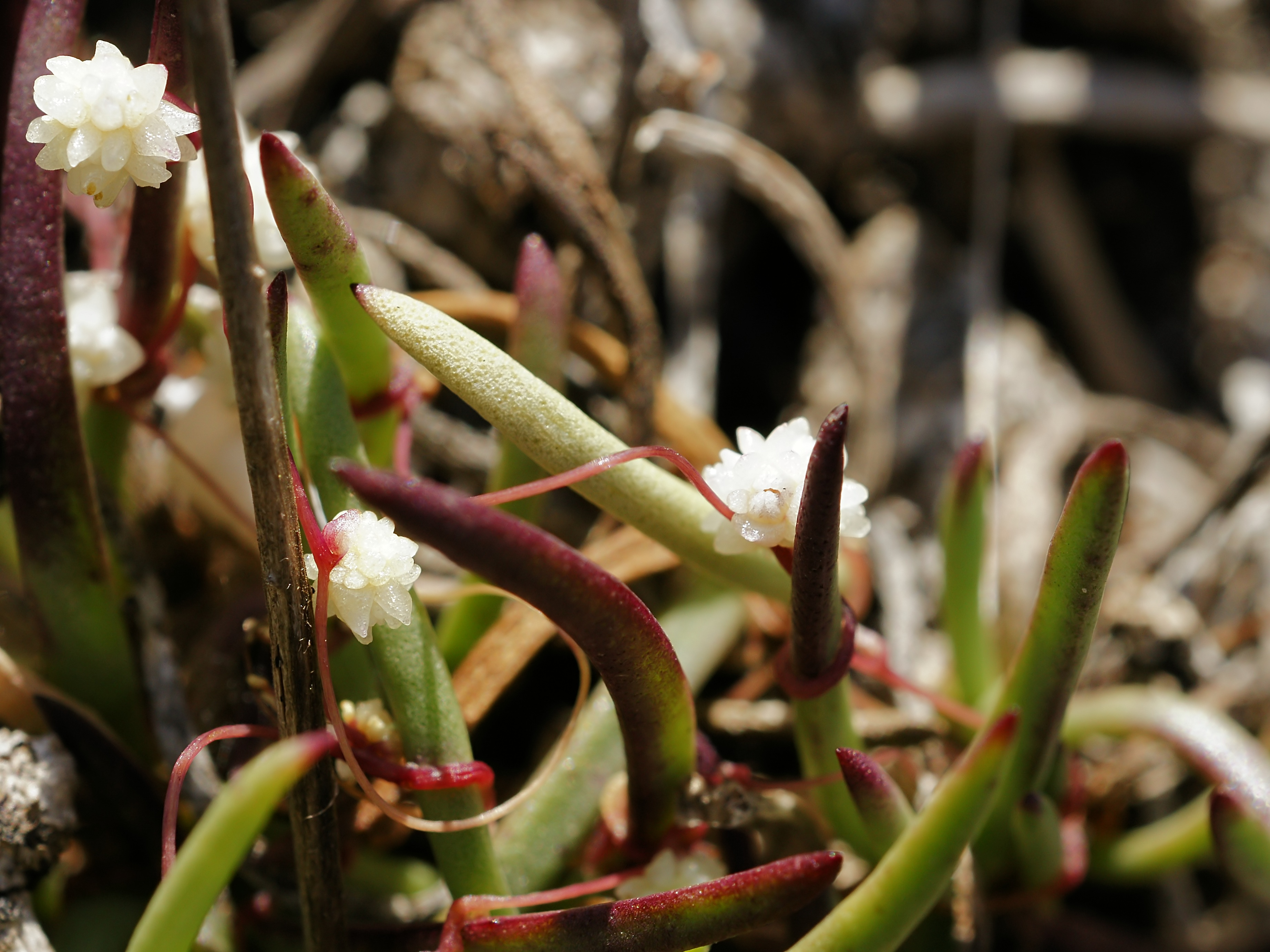
Cuscuta planiflora

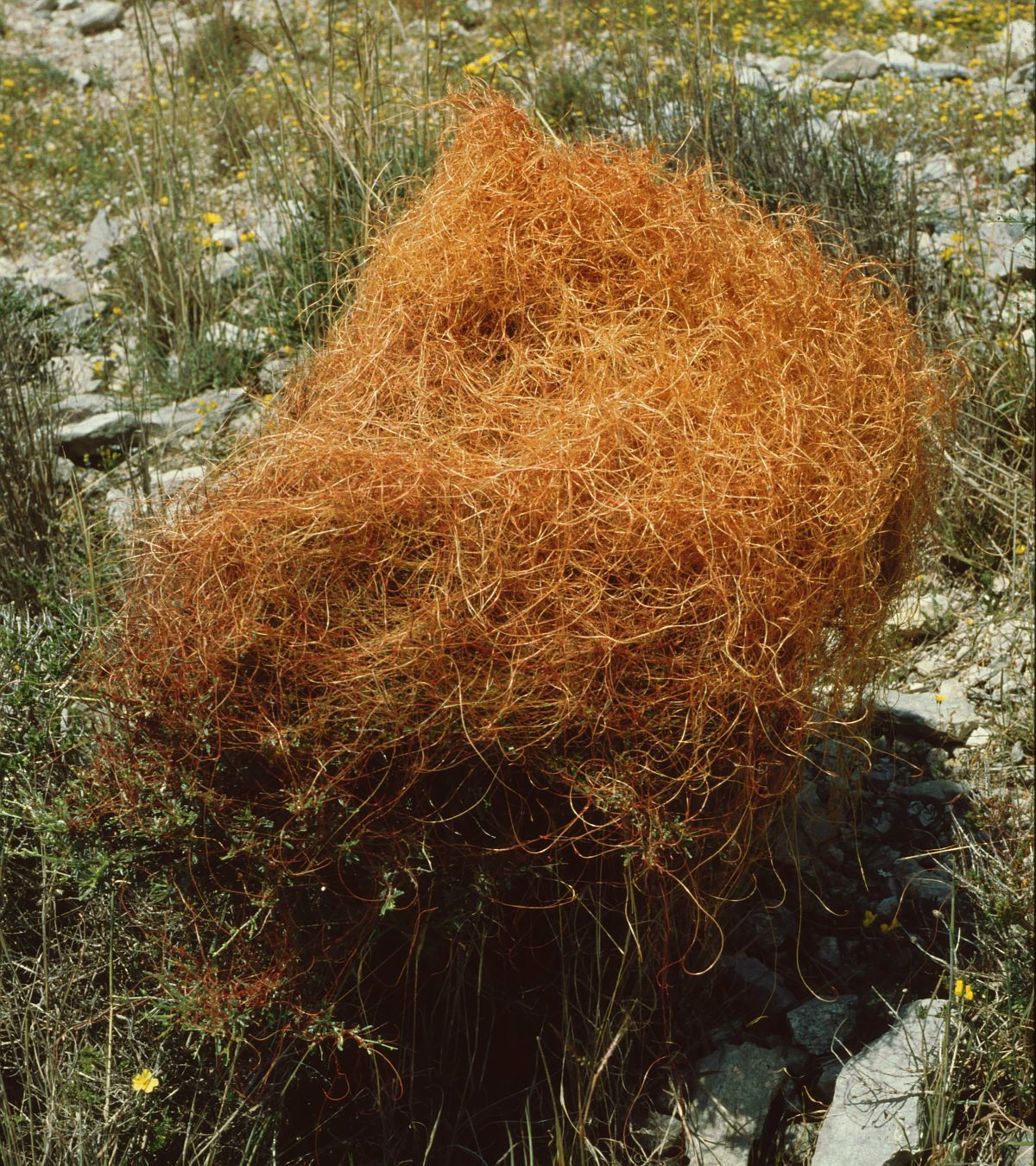
Cuscuta spp.

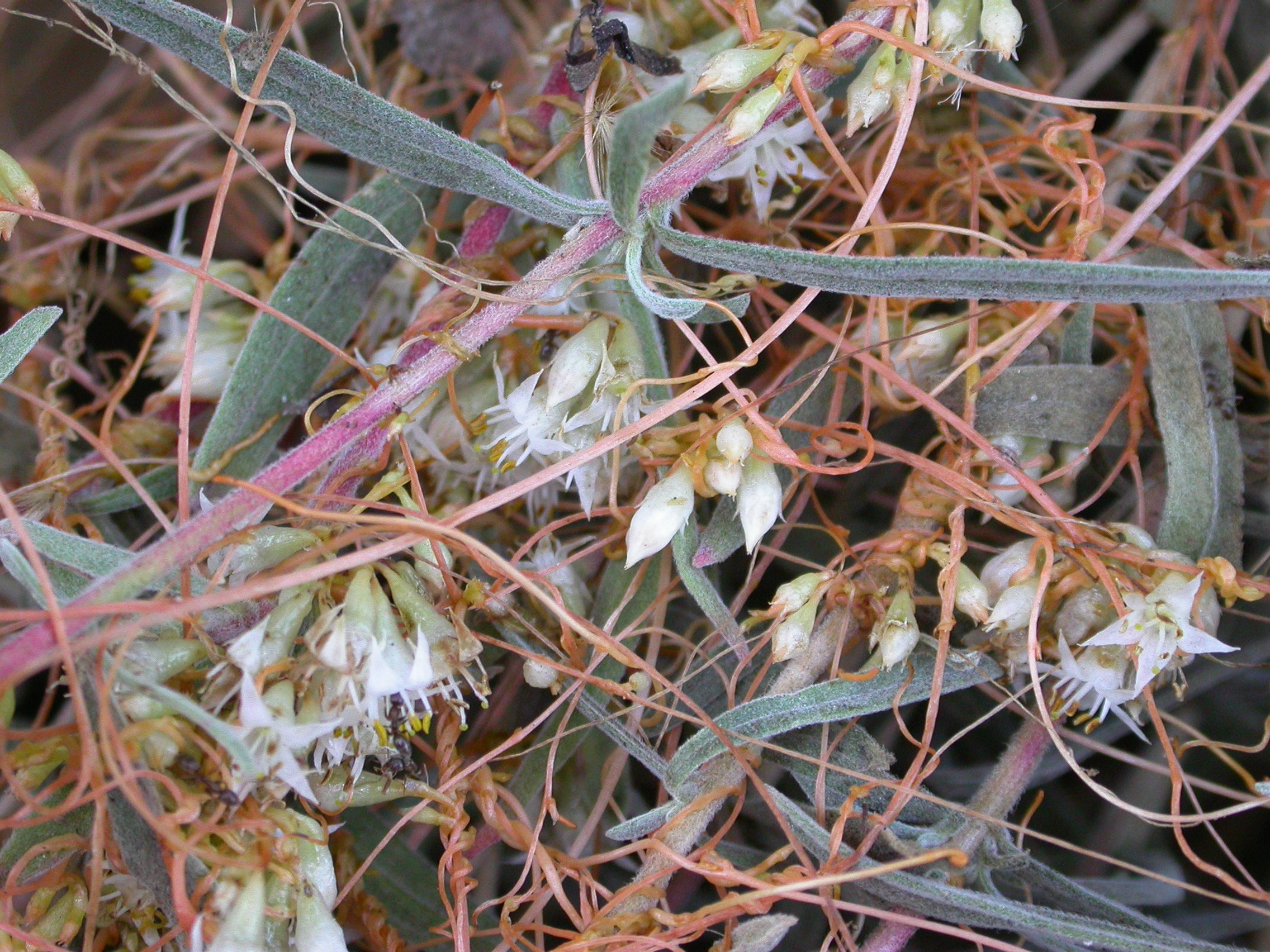
Cuscuta subinclusa

- Cuscuta abyssinica A.Rich.
- Cuscuta acadiana Costea & Stefanović
- Cuscuta acuta Engelm.
- Cuscuta acutiloba Engelm.
- Cuscuta africana Willd.
- Cuscuta alata Brandegee
- Cuscuta alataloba Yunck.
- Cuscuta americana L.
- Cuscuta andina Phil.
- Cuscuta angulata Engelm.
- Cuscuta appendiculata Engelm.
- Cuscuta approximata Bab. - alfalfa dodder (Eurasia, Africa)
- Cuscuta argentinana Yunck.
- Cuscuta atrans Feinbrun
- Cuscuta australis R.Br.
- Cuscuta azteca Costea & M.A.R.Wright
- Cuscuta babylonica Aucher ex Choisy
- Cuscuta balansae Boiss. & Reut. ex Yunck.
- Cuscuta basarabica Buia
- Cuscuta bella Yunck.
- Cuscuta bifurcata Yunck.
- Cuscuta blepharolepis Welw. ex Hiern
- Cuscuta boldinghii Urb.
- Cuscuta boliviana Yunck.
- Cuscuta bonafortunae Costea & I.García
- Cuscuta brachycalyx (Yunck.) Yunck.
- Cuscuta bracteata Engelm.
- Cuscuta brevistyla A.Braun ex A.Rich.
- Cuscuta bucharica Palib.
- Cuscuta burrellii Yunck.
- Cuscuta californica Hook. & Arn. - California dodder (western North America)
- Cuscuta callinema Butkov
- Cuscuta camelorum Pavlov
- Cuscuta campestris Yunck.
- Cuscuta capitata Roxb.
- Cuscuta carnosa Costea & I.García
- Cuscuta cassytoides Nees ex Engelm.
- Cuscuta castroviejoi M.A.García
- Cuscuta cephalanthi Engelm.
- Cuscuta chapalana Yunck.
- Cuscuta chilensis Ker Gawl.
- Cuscuta chinensis Lam.
- Cuscuta chittagongensis Sengupta, M.S.Khan & Huq
- Cuscuta choisiana Yunck.
- Cuscuta cockerellii Yunck.
- Cuscuta colombiana Yunck.
- Cuscuta compacta Juss. ex Choisy
- Cuscuta convallariiflora Pavlov
- Cuscuta corniculata Engelm.
- Cuscuta coryli Engelm.
- Cuscuta corymbosa Ruiz & Pav.
- Cuscuta costaricensis Yunck.
- Cuscuta cotijana Costea & I.García
- Cuscuta cozumeliensis Yunck.
- Cuscuta cristata Engelm.
- Cuscuta cuspidata Engelm.
- Cuscuta decipiens Yunck.
- Cuscuta deltoidea Yunck.
- Cuscuta dentatasquamata Yunck.
- Cuscuta denticulata Engelm.
- Cuscuta desmouliniana Yunck.
- Cuscuta difficilis Stefanovic & Costea
- Cuscuta draconella Costea & M.A.R.Wright
- Cuscuta durangana Yunck.
- Cuscuta elpassiana Pavlov
- Cuscuta epilinum Weihe
- Cuscuta epithymum (L.) L. – clover dodder (Eurasia, Africa)
- Cuscuta erosa Yunck.
- Cuscuta europaea L. – greater dodder (Europe)
- Cuscuta exaltata Engelm.
- Cuscuta ferganensis Butkov
- Cuscuta flossdorfii Hicken
- Cuscuta foetida Kunth
- Cuscuta friesii Yunck.
- Cuscuta gennesaretana Sroëlov ex Feinbr. & S.Taub
- Cuscuta gerrardii Baker
- Cuscuta gigantea Griff.
- Cuscuta glabrior (Engelm.) Yunck.
- Cuscuta globiflora Engelm.
- Cuscuta globosa Ridl.
- Cuscuta globulosa Benth.
- Cuscuta glomerata Choisy - rope dodder (North America)
- Cuscuta goyaziana Yunck.
- Cuscuta gracillima Engelm.
- Cuscuta grandiflora Kunth
- Cuscuta gronovii Willd. ex Schult.
- Cuscuta gymnocarpa Engelm.
- Cuscuta harperi Small
- Cuscuta haughtii Yunck.
- Cuscuta haussknechtii Yunck.
- Cuscuta hitchcockii Yunck.
- Cuscuta howelliana P.Rubtzov
- Cuscuta hyalina Roth
- Cuscuta iguanella Costea & I.García
- Cuscuta incurvata Progel
- Cuscuta indecora Choisy
- Cuscuta insolita Costea & I.García
- Cuscuta insquamata Yunck.
- Cuscuta jalapensis Schltdl.
- Cuscuta janarthanamii Kolte, A.Deshp. & Kambale
- Cuscuta japonica Choisy
- Cuscuta jepsonii Yunck.
- Cuscuta karatavica Pavlov
- Cuscuta kilimanjari Oliv.
- Cuscuta kotschyana Boiss.
- Cuscuta krishnae Udayan & Robi
- Cuscuta kurdica Engelm.
- Cuscuta lacerata Yunck.
- Cuscuta legitima Costea & M.A.R.Wright
- Cuscuta lehmanniana Bunge
- Cuscuta leptantha Engelm.
- Cuscuta letourneuxii Trab.
- Cuscuta liliputana Costea & M.A.R.Wright
- Cuscuta lindsayi Wiggins
- Cuscuta longiloba Yunck.
- Cuscuta lophosepala Butkov
- Cuscuta lucidicarpa Yunck.
- Cuscuta lupuliformis Krock.
- Cuscuta macrocephala Schaffner ex Yuncker
- Cuscuta macrolepis R.C.Fang & S.H.Huang
- Cuscuta macvaughii Yunck.
- Cuscuta mantiqueirana Costea, S.S.Silva & Sim.-Bianch.
- Cuscuta maroccana Trab.
- Cuscuta membranacea Yunck.
- Cuscuta mesatlantica Dobignard
- Cuscuta mexicana Yunck.
- Cuscuta micrantha Choisy
- Cuscuta microstyla Engelm.
- Cuscuta mitriformis Engelm. ex Hemsl.
- Cuscuta modesta Costea & M.A.R.Wright
- Cuscuta monogyna Vahl
- Cuscuta montana Costea & M.A.R.Wright
- Cuscuta natalensis Baker
- Cuscuta nevadensis I.M.Johnst.
- Cuscuta nitida E.Mey. ex Choisy
- Cuscuta nivea M.A.García
- Cuscuta nuwuviana Costea & Stefanović
- Cuscuta obtusata (Engelm.) Trab.
- Cuscuta obtusiflora Kunth
- Cuscuta occidentalis Millsp.
- Cuscuta odontolepis Engelm.
- Cuscuta odorata Ruiz & Pav.
- Cuscuta orbiculata Yunck.
- Cuscuta ortegana Yunck.
- Cuscuta pacifica Costea & M.A.R.Wright – salt marsh dodder
- Cuscuta paitana Yunck.
- Cuscuta palaestina Boiss.
- Cuscuta palustris Yunck.
- Cuscuta pamirica Butkov
- Cuscuta parodiana Yunck.
- Cuscuta partita Choisy
- Cuscuta parviflora Engelm.
- Cuscuta pauciflora Phil.
- Cuscuta pedicellata Ledeb.
- Cuscuta pellucida Butkov
- Cuscuta pentagona Engelm. – golden dodder (United States)
- Cuscuta peruviana Yunck.
- Cuscuta planiflora Ten.
- Cuscuta plattensis A.Nelson
- Cuscuta platyloba Progel
- Cuscuta polyanthemos Schaffner ex Yuncker
- Cuscuta polygonorum Engelm.
- Cuscuta potosina Schaffner ex S.Watson
- Cuscuta prismatica Pav. ex Choisy
- Cuscuta psorothamnensis Stefanovic, M.A.García & Costea
- Cuscuta pulchella Engelm.
- Cuscuta punana Costea & M.A.R.Wright
- Cuscuta purpurata Phil.
- Cuscuta purpusii Yunck.
- Cuscuta pusilla Phil. ex Yunck.
- Cuscuta racemosa Mart.
- Cuscuta rausii M.A.García
- Cuscuta reflexa Roxb.
- Cuscuta rojasii Hunz.
- Cuscuta rostrata Shuttlew. ex Engelm. & A.Gray
- Cuscuta rostricarpa Yunck.
- Cuscuta rotundiflora Hunz.
- Cuscuta rubella Yunck.
- Cuscuta rugosiceps Yunck.
- Cuscuta runyonii Yunck.
- Cuscuta ruschanica Yunusov
- Cuscuta rustica Hunz.
- Cuscuta salina Engelm. – salt marsh dodder (western United States)
- Cuscuta sandwichiana Choisy – Kaunaʻoa (Hawaiʻi)
- Cuscuta santapaui Banerji & S.Das
- Cuscuta saururi Engelm.
- Cuscuta scandens Brot.
- Cuscuta schlechteri Yunck.
- Cuscuta serrata Yunck.
- Cuscuta sharmanum Mukerjee & P.K.Bhattach.
- Cuscuta sidarum Liebm.
- Cuscuta somaliensis Yunck.
- Cuscuta squamata Engelm.
- Cuscuta stenocalycina Palib.
- Cuscuta stenolepis Engelm.
- Cuscuta strobilacea Liebm.
- Cuscuta suaveolens Ser.
- Cuscuta subinclusa Durand & Hilg.
- Cuscuta suksdorfii Yunck.
- Cuscuta syrtorum Arbajeva
- Cuscuta taimensis P.P.A.Ferreira & Dettke
- Cuscuta tasmanica Engelm.
- Cuscuta tatei Yunck.
- Cuscuta timida Costea & M.A.R.Wright
- Cuscuta timorensis Decne. ex Engelm.
- Cuscuta tinctoria Mart. ex Engelm.
- Cuscuta tolteca Costea & M.A.R.Wright
- Cuscuta triumvirati Lange
- Cuscuta tuberculata Brandegee
- Cuscuta umbellata Kunth
- Cuscuta vandevenderi Costea & M.A.R.Wright
- Cuscuta veatchii Brandegee
- Cuscuta victoriana Yunck.
- Cuscuta violacea Rajput & Syeda
- Cuscuta volcanica Costea & I.García
- Cuscuta warneri Yunck.
- Cuscuta werdermannii Hunz.
- Cuscuta woodsonii Yunck.
- Cuscuta xanthochortos Mart. ex Engelm.
- Cuscuta yucatana Yunck.
- Cuscuta yunckeriana Hunz.
