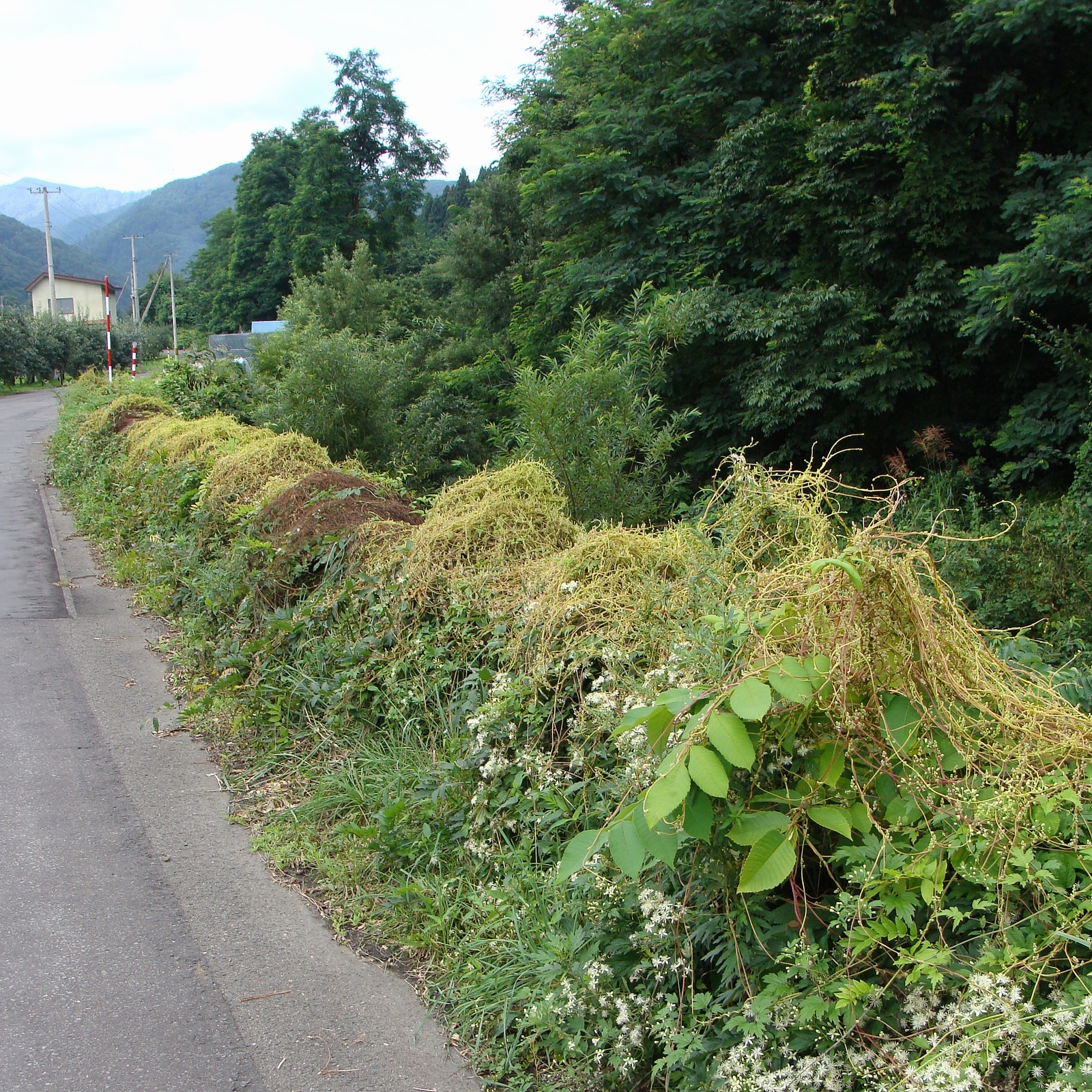

Scientific classification
- Kingdom: Plantae
- Clade: Tracheophytes
- Clade: Angiosperms
- Clade: Eudicots
- Clade: Asterids
- Order: Solanales
- Family: Convolvulaceae
- Genus: Cuscuta
- Species: C. japonica

Binomial name
- Cuscuta japonica Choisy

Synonyms
- Monogynella japonica (Choisy) Hadac & Chrtek

= Cuscuta japonica =

Species of flowering plant

Cuscuta japonica, commonly known as Japanese dodder, is a parasitic vine. It has been listed by the State of California as a noxious weed. It has a range of effects on its host and has repeatedly been introduced to the United States of America. C. japonica looks very similar to other vines, making it difficult to distinguish.

== Effects on host ==
The Japanese dodder is a plant that parasitizes other plants. From mild development issues to serious complications sometimes resulting in death, the Japanese dodder can cause a wide spectrum of effects on its plant host. Farmers in particular can be affected by this plant, as infection leads to fewer crops they are able to harvest.

== Morphology ==
Cuscuta japonica shares a similar morphology to vines, displaying stems that are mostly yellow with bits of red along it. The Japanese dodder also exhibits small flowers that are "pale-yellow to cream" in color and contain one circular stigma. Any leaves it has are very small and "scale-like" in shape and texture. Fruit produced are small and capsule-like, only carrying a couple of seeds.

== History ==
Cuscuta japonica can be found non-invasively in a variety of places on the continent of Asia. The plant was introduced and reintroduced to the United States of America multiple times starting from the 1940s under the guise of a medicinal plant, and was thought to have been eradicated a couple of times.
