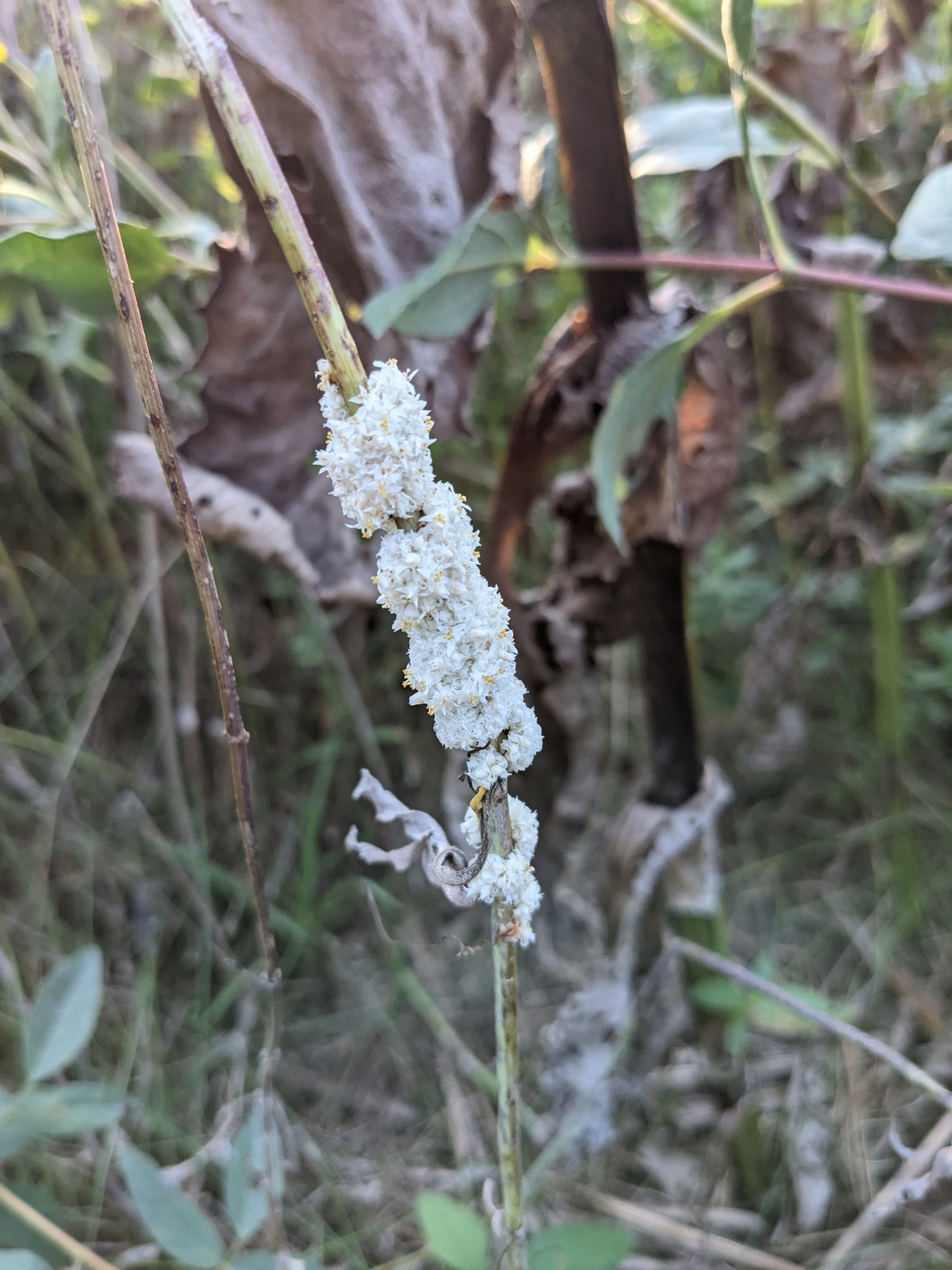

Scientific classification
- Kingdom: Plantae
- Clade: Tracheophytes
- Clade: Angiosperms
- Clade: Eudicots
- Clade: Asterids
- Order: Solanales
- Family: Convolvulaceae
- Genus: Cuscuta
- Species: C. glomerata

Binomial name
- Cuscuta glomerata Choisy

= Cuscuta glomerata =

Species of flowering plant

Cuscuta glomerata is a parasitic plant in the morning glory family, Convolvuaceae. It is commonly known by the name rope dodder.

== Physical characteristics ==
=== Flower ===
The flowers of Cuscuta glomerata are white and bloom in July, August, and September.

The flowers have a distinctive spiral arrangement of small, white, stalkless flowers along its main stem. These flowers have 5 fused petals with lance-like shapes and pointed tips, spreading out like stars and curving slightly backward. There are 5 long, triangular calyx lobes with backward-pointing tips and 8 to 15 triangular bracts at their base. Inside the floral tube is an ovary with two elongated styles, each with a round stigma at the tip and a small swelling at the base called a stylopodium. The floral tube also contains five stamens with yellow tips, attached just below the petal lobes. Surrounding the ovary are fringed scales that are typically shorter in length.

=== Leaves and stems ===
Cuscuta glomerata has very small or no leaves. Its stems are thin, smooth, and often yellow or orange. They grow in tangled, wiry masses that wrap around and rely on the host plant for support. The stems also have small parts called haustoria, which are modified roots. These haustoria penetrate the host plant to extract moisture and nutrients from it.

=== Fruit ===
The fruit of Cuscuta glomerata is a round, flattened capsule, measuring about 1/8 inch in diameter. At the top of the capsule is a thickened ridge created by the dried stylopodium. This ridge surrounds the opening from which the seeds are released. When mature, the capsules turn brown in color.

== Habitat ==
Cuscuta glomerata is native to the central United States and can be found in the following states: Arkansas, Iowa, Illinois, Indiana, Kansas, Kentucky, Louisiana, Michigan, Minnesota, Missouri, Mississippi, North Dakota, Nebraska, New Mexico, Ohio, Oklahoma, South Dakota, Tennessee, Texas, and Wisconsin.

It generally grows in "low wet areas" and "moist prairies". As a parasitic plant, it grows on various herbs and frequently on Asteraceae.
