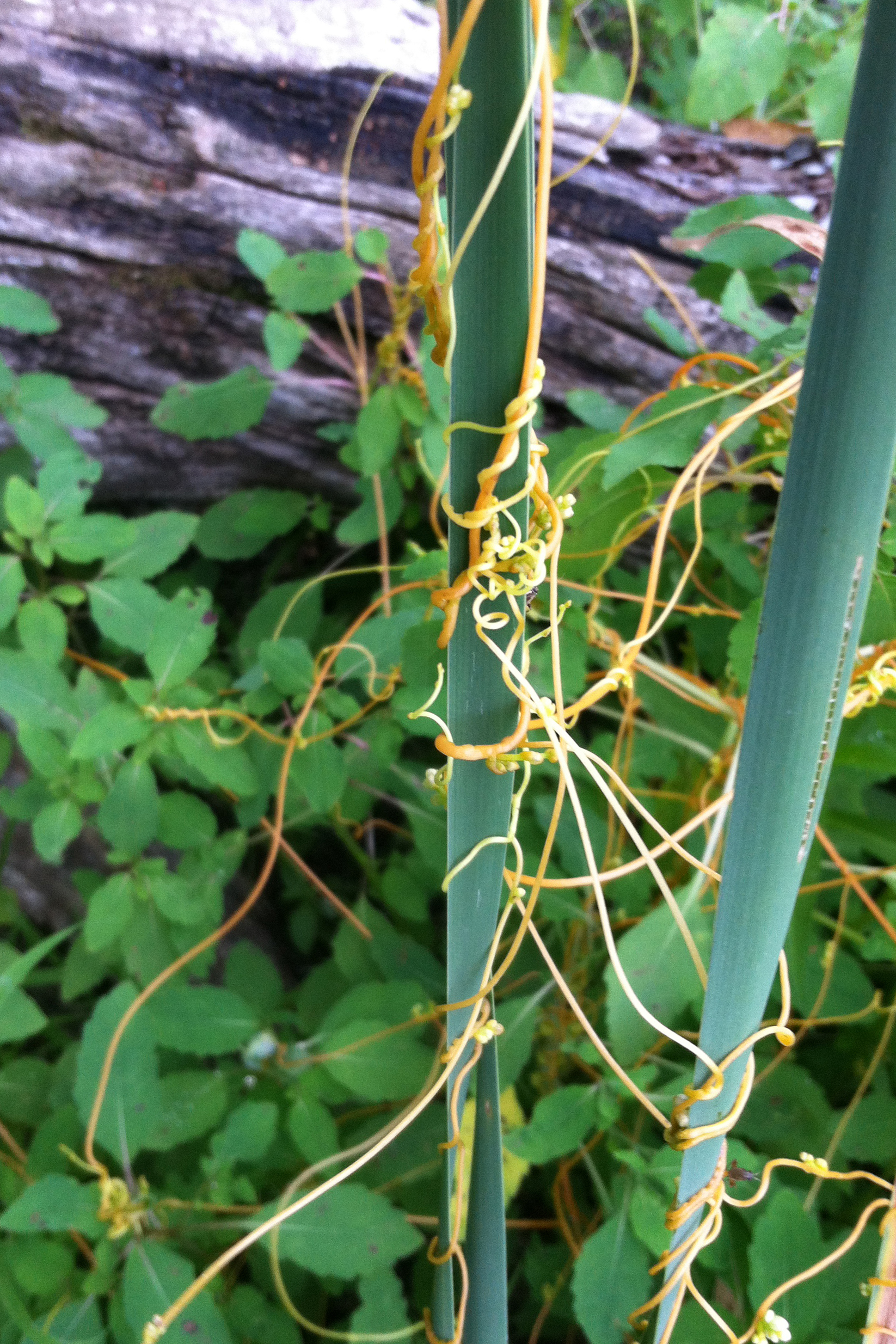

Scientific classification
- Kingdom: Plantae
- Clade: Tracheophytes
- Clade: Angiosperms
- Clade: Eudicots
- Clade: Asterids
- Order: Solanales
- Family: Convolvulaceae
- Genus: Cuscuta
- Species: C. gronovii

Binomial name
- Cuscuta gronovii Willd.

= Cuscuta gronovii =

Species of flowering plant

Cuscuta gronovii, scaldweed, is a yellow vine that grows as a parasite off other plants. It is a dicot.

== Description ==
Cuscuta gronovii belongs to the family Convolvuaceae, including the morning glories, comprising about 200 species. It is a parasitic annual vine that infects host plants in a parasitic relationship. Its stems appear orange-yellow in color. The vine can grow up to a length of one meter or more, entangling itself around the host plant. Although it appears to be leafless, it has tiny, alternate, scale-like leaves. The vine produces white flowers with bell-shaped, five-lobed corollas, and sepals united at the base. The flowers are roughly 1/8 of an inch apart from one another.

There are currently three known subspecies of Cuscuta gronovii: calyptrata, gronovii, and latiflora.

== Etymology ==
Cuscuta gronovii was named in honor of botanist Jay Fredrik Gronon. The genus Cuscuta was named after the Arabic word for "dodders", and the word dodder originates from an Old English word meaning "todder".

There are four widely used common names for this species: scaldweed, common dodder, swamp dodder, and love dodder.

== Distribution and ecology ==
The common dodder can be found in every state of the United States with the exceptions of Utah, Nevada, California, Washington, Alaska and Hawaii. It can also be found in all provinces, though not territories of Canada, with the exception of British Columbia. The plant is native in all of these areas.

This species has naturalized in France, Germany, Luxembourg, the Netherlands, and Italy.

This species is commonly found growing in temperate forest habitats. Because it requires an abundance of moisture, the common dodder is usually found in floodplains.

== Life cycle ==
Plants within the genus Cuscuta generally do not contain chlorophyll, nor are they photosynthetically active. This species, however, does contain a small amount of chlorophyll. It is not enough to support the plant via autotrophy alone. This is why the common dodder is dependent upon other plants to survive.

The life cycle begins with germination, but seeds are unable to survive long periods of time without first associating themselves with host plants. Adult plants wind themselves around their host and begin the attachment phase. Parenchymal cells begin pre-haustoria development. The next phase is referred to as the penetration phase, where the host plant is punctured through by a fully developed haustoria. This process allows for water and macromolecules to be transferred from the host to the plant. While this can be harmful for the host plant, the effects are generally not fatal.

Common host plants for this species include, but are not limited to, the spotted touch-me-not, false nettle, wood nettle, square-stemmed monkeyflower, and ditch stonecrop.

The plant flowers between July and October. It is pollinated by wasps.
