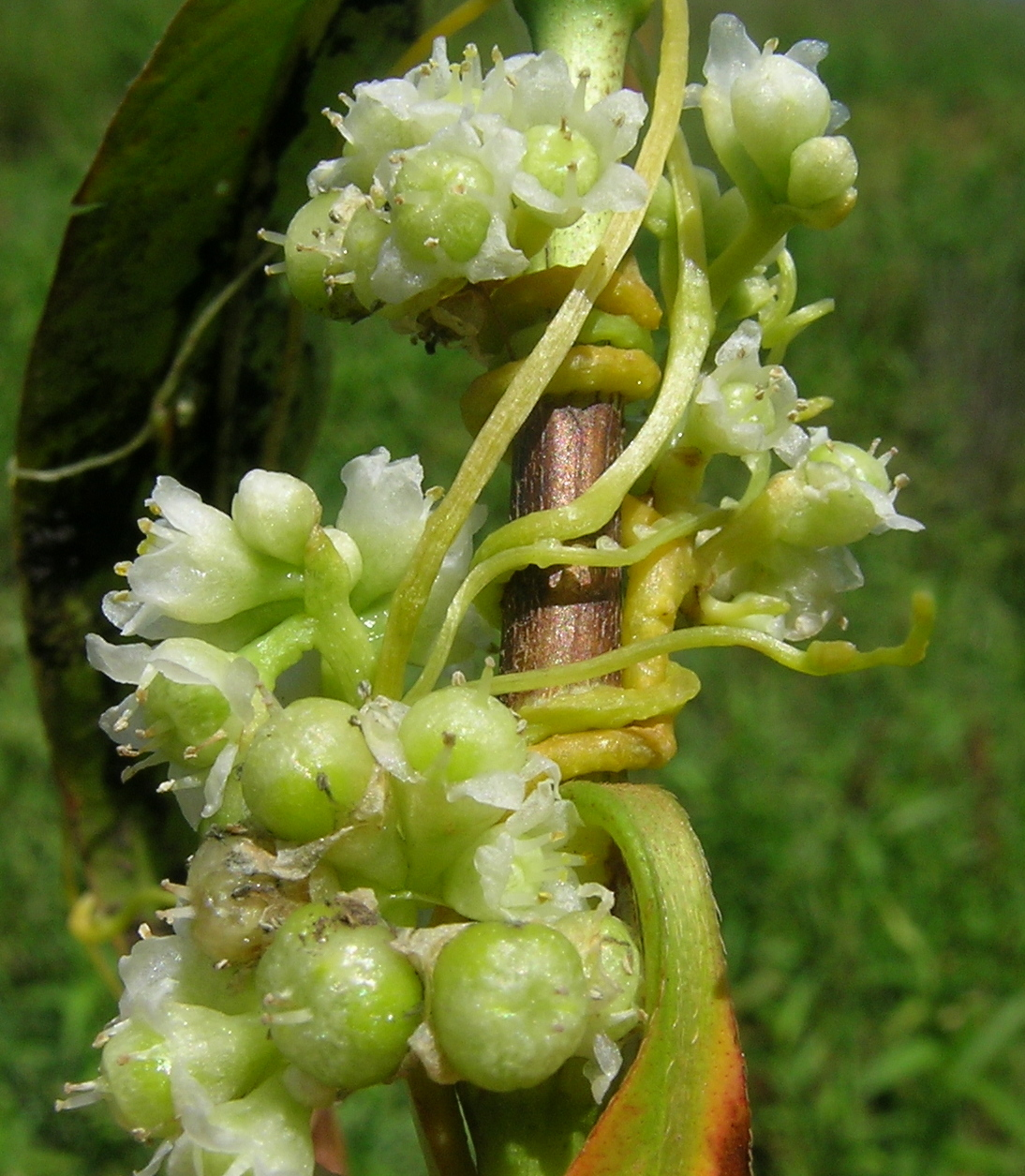

Scientific classification
- Kingdom: Plantae
- Clade: Tracheophytes
- Clade: Angiosperms
- Clade: Eudicots
- Clade: Asterids
- Order: Solanales
- Family: Convolvulaceae
- Genus: Cuscuta
- Species: C. australis

Binomial name
- Cuscuta australis R.Br.

Synonyms
- Cuscuta obtusiflora var. australis (R.Br.) Engelm. Grammica australis (R.Br.) Hadac & Chrtek; Grammica scandens subsp. australis (R.Br.) Holub

= Cuscuta australis =

Australian dodder

Species of flowering plant

Cuscuta australis, commonly known as Australian dodder, is a herb in the family Convolvulaceae.

The annual parasitic twining herb or climber that is associated with many hosts. It blooms between November and March producing 5-merous white-cream-yellow flowers in compact clusters on pedicels which are less than 2.5 millimetres (0.1 in) long. The lobes are rounded-triangular and shorter than or equal in length to the corolla tube. It parasitises both native and exotic plants. To maximize its seed yield, it synchronizes its flowering to that of its host plant via detection of a signaling protein in the host.

== Distribution ==
=== Australia ===
In Western Australia, it is found in a small area in the Fitzgerald River National Park in the Great Southern and Goldfields-Esperance regions of Western Australia where it grows in sandy-clay soils. It is also found in New South Wales, Victoria, Queensland, and New Guinea

=== Elsewhere ===
It is found widely throughout the world and considered native to Europe, tropical Asia, Africa, Australasia and temperate Asia.

== Taxonomy ==
C. australis was first described by Robert Brown in 1810. The type specimen, BM00016305, was collected on 25 September 1802 at Broad Sound, Queensland, Australia by Robert Brown.
