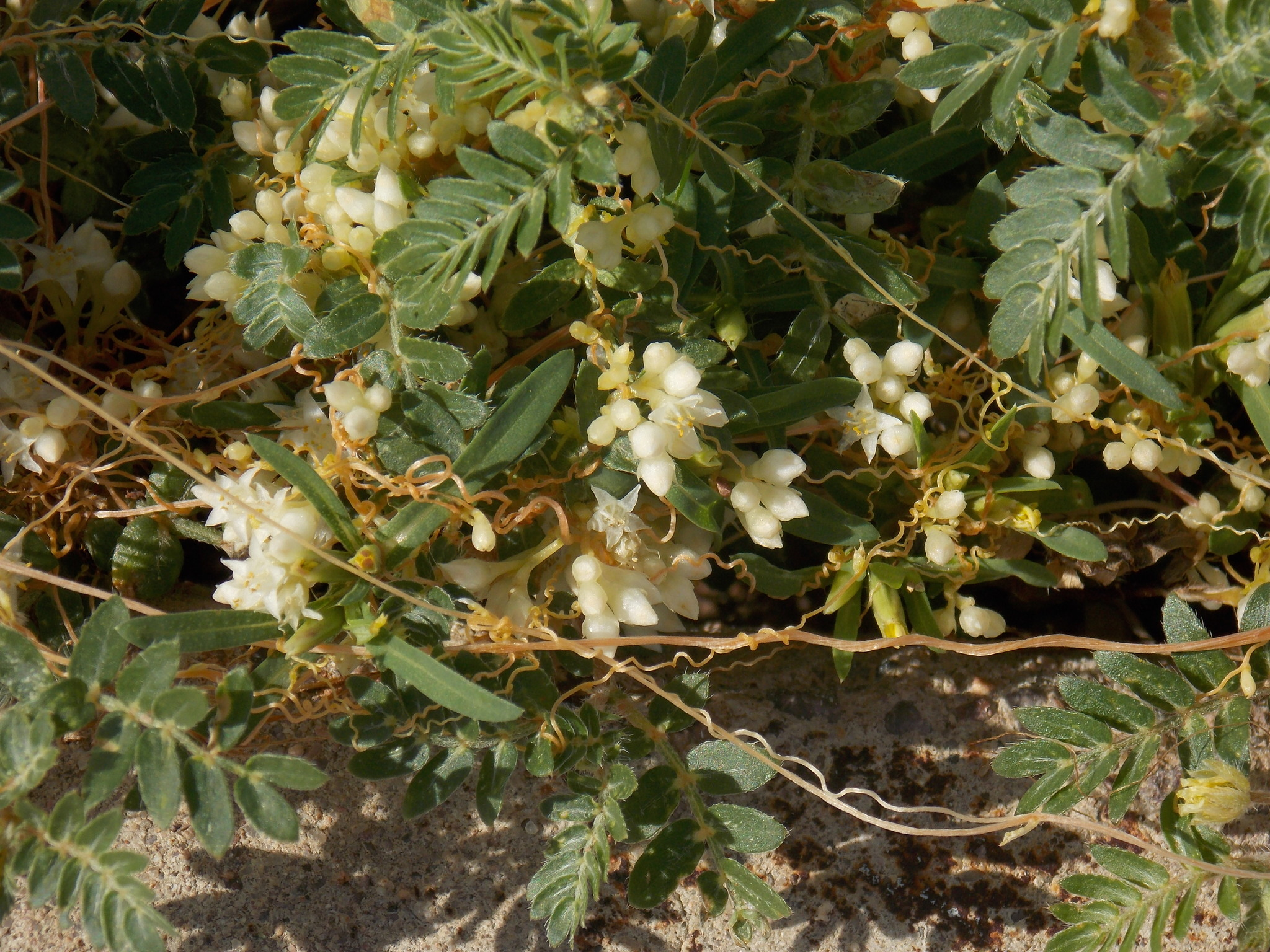

Conservation status
- Secure (NatureServe)

Scientific classification
- Kingdom: Plantae
- Clade: Tracheophytes
- Clade: Angiosperms
- Clade: Eudicots
- Clade: Asterids
- Order: Solanales
- Family: Convolvulaceae
- Genus: Cuscuta
- Species: C. umbellata

Binomial name
- Cuscuta umbellata Kunth

= Cuscuta umbellata =

Species of flowering plant

Cuscuta umbellata, commonly known as flatglobe dodder, is a parasitic plant in the morning glory family (Convulvulaceae) in the Sonoran Desert of the southwestern United States. After summer monsoon rains, it spreads over the host plant in tangled masses of orange strings.
