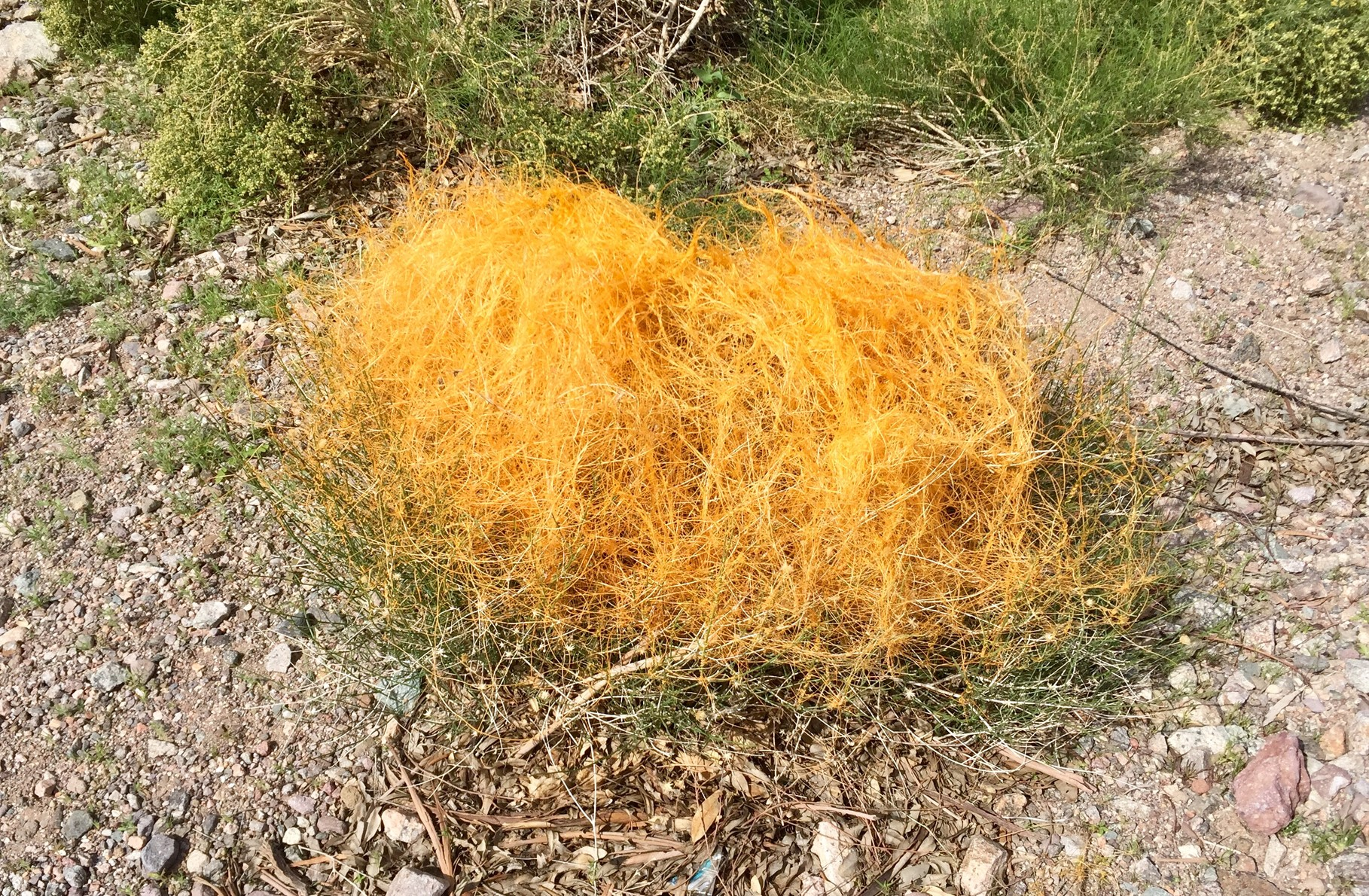

Conservation status
- Apparently Secure (NatureServe)

Scientific classification
- Kingdom: Plantae
- Clade: Tracheophytes
- Clade: Angiosperms
- Clade: Eudicots
- Clade: Asterids
- Order: Solanales
- Family: Convolvulaceae
- Genus: Cuscuta
- Species: C. denticulata

Binomial name
- Cuscuta denticulata Engelm.

= Cuscuta denticulata =

Species of flowering plant

Cuscuta denticulata, commonly known as desert dodder or small-toothed dodder, is a thin, yellow to orange, parasitic annual vine in the morning glory family (Convulvulaceae), native to the deserts of the south-western United States and northern Mexico.

== Description ==
=== Growth pattern ===
It is an annual plant that grows as a very thin orange-ish parasitic vine, with clumping twinings around the host stems. It parasitizes the host by sending small, short-lived rootlets (haustoria) into its tissues, from which it absorbs moisture and nutrients.

=== Leaves and stems ===
Yellow to orange stems are without hairs, with minute scale-like leaves.

=== Inflorescence and fruit ===
It blooms from May to October with tiny spikes of clusters of miniature white, 5-parted bell shaped flowers. Corolla lobes are bent back, with overlapping calyx lobes. Both calyx and corolla have fine teeth on their margins, hence the species name and common name. Fruits are conical capsules.

== Habitat and range ==
It grows up to 4,000 feet (1,200 m) in the Mojave Desert and Sonoran Desert into Baja California. It parasitizes plants of the creosote bush scrub and Joshua tree woodland communities, such as creosote bush (Larrea tridentata) and cheesebush (Ambrosia salsola).
