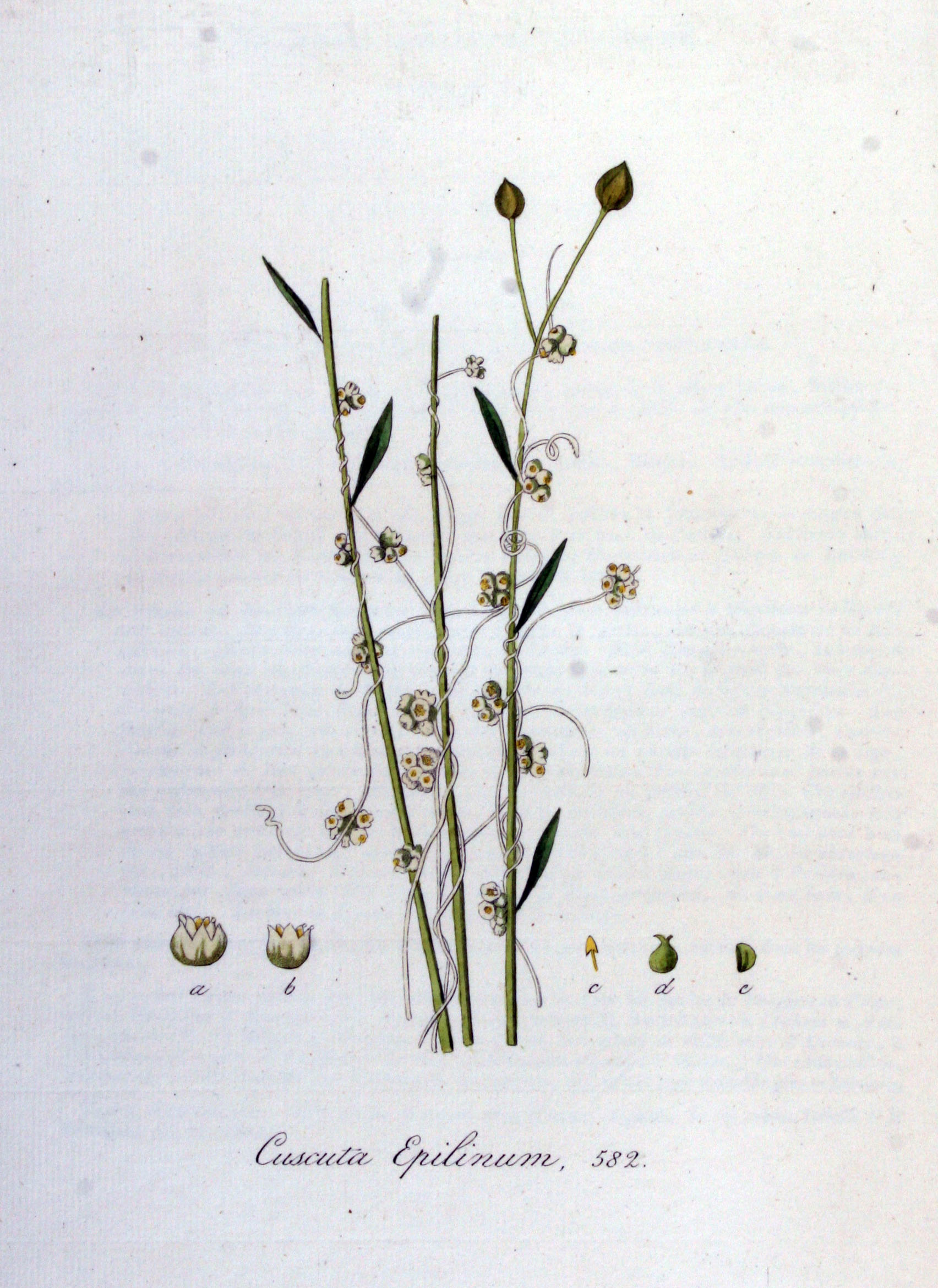

Scientific classification
- Kingdom: Plantae
- Clade: Tracheophytes
- Clade: Angiosperms
- Clade: Eudicots
- Clade: Asterids
- Order: Solanales
- Family: Convolvulaceae
- Genus: Cuscuta
- Species: C. epilinum

Binomial name
- Cuscuta epilinum Weihe

= Cuscuta epilinum =

Species of flowering plant

Cuscuta epilinum is a species of flowering plant belonging to the family Convolvulaceae.

Its native range is Iran to Central Asia and was introduced into Europe, Canada, and other parts of the world.
