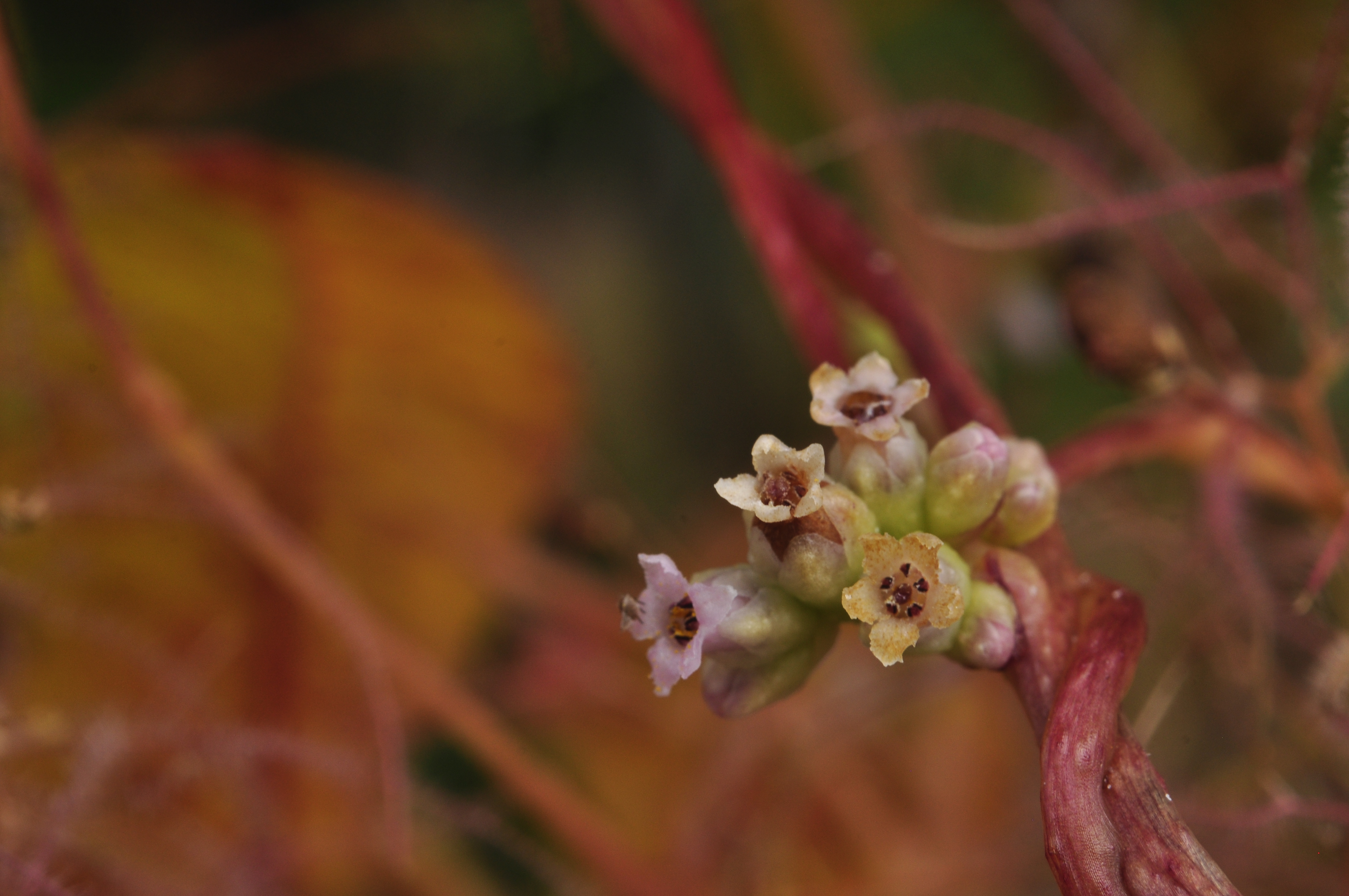

Scientific classification
- Kingdom: Plantae
- Clade: Tracheophytes
- Clade: Angiosperms
- Clade: Eudicots
- Clade: Asterids
- Order: Solanales
- Family: Convolvulaceae
- Genus: Cuscuta
- Species: C. monogyna

Binomial name
- Cuscuta monogyna Vahl

= Cuscuta monogyna =

Species of plant

Cuscuta monogyna, the eastern dodder, is a species of annual herb in the family Convolvulaceae. They are climbers and have simple, broad leaves.

== Sources ==
This article incorporates text from a free content work. Licensed under CC0 (license statement/permission). Text taken from Cuscuta monogyna. Encyclopedia of Life.
