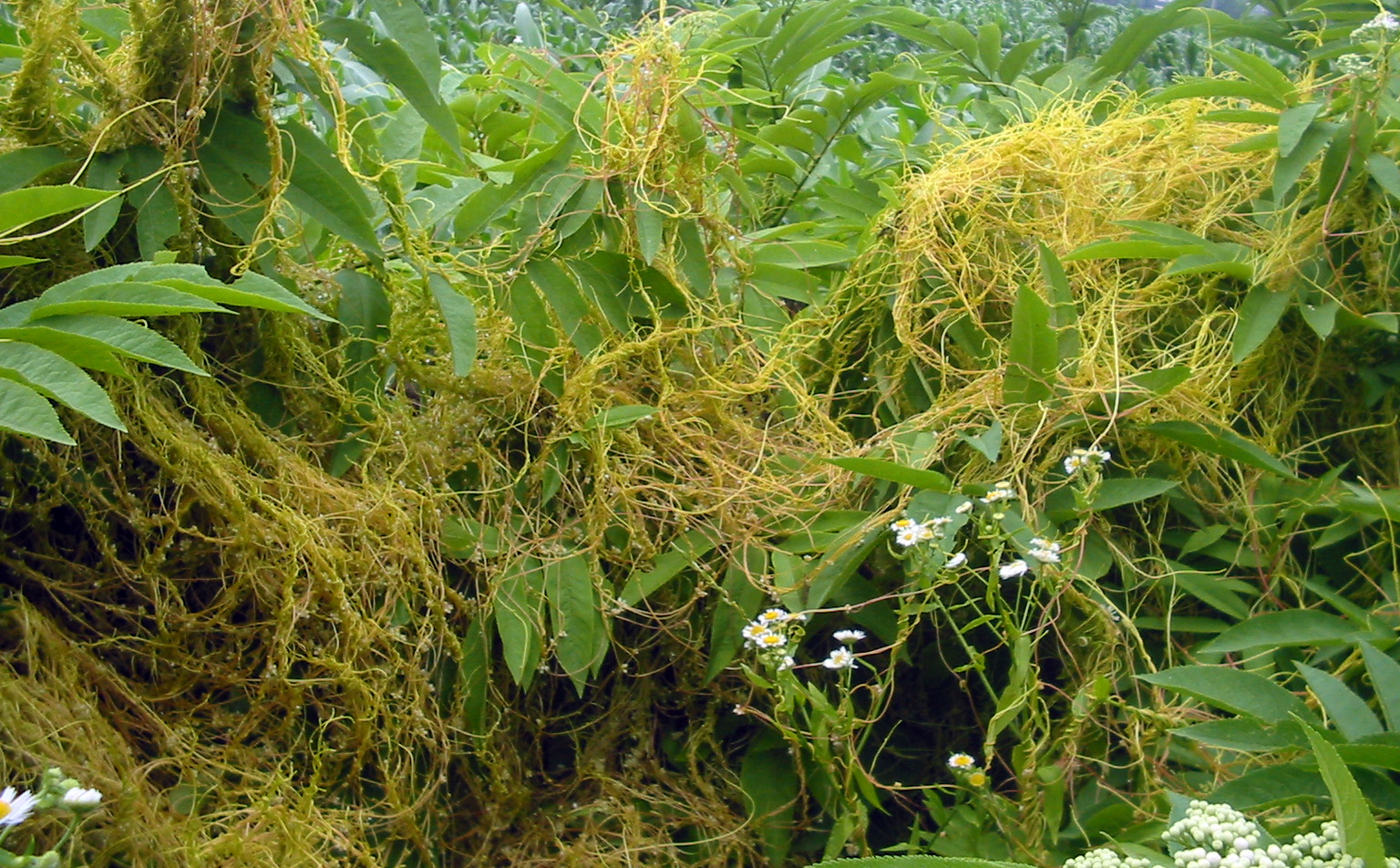
- Cuscuta europaea on Sambucus ebulus

Scientific classification
- Kingdom: Plantae
- Clade: Tracheophytes
- Clade: Angiosperms
- Clade: Eudicots
- Clade: Asterids
- Order: Solanales
- Family: Convolvulaceae
- Tribe: Cuscuteae
- Genus: Cuscuta; L.

Species
- See list

= Cuscuta =

Genus of parasitic plants

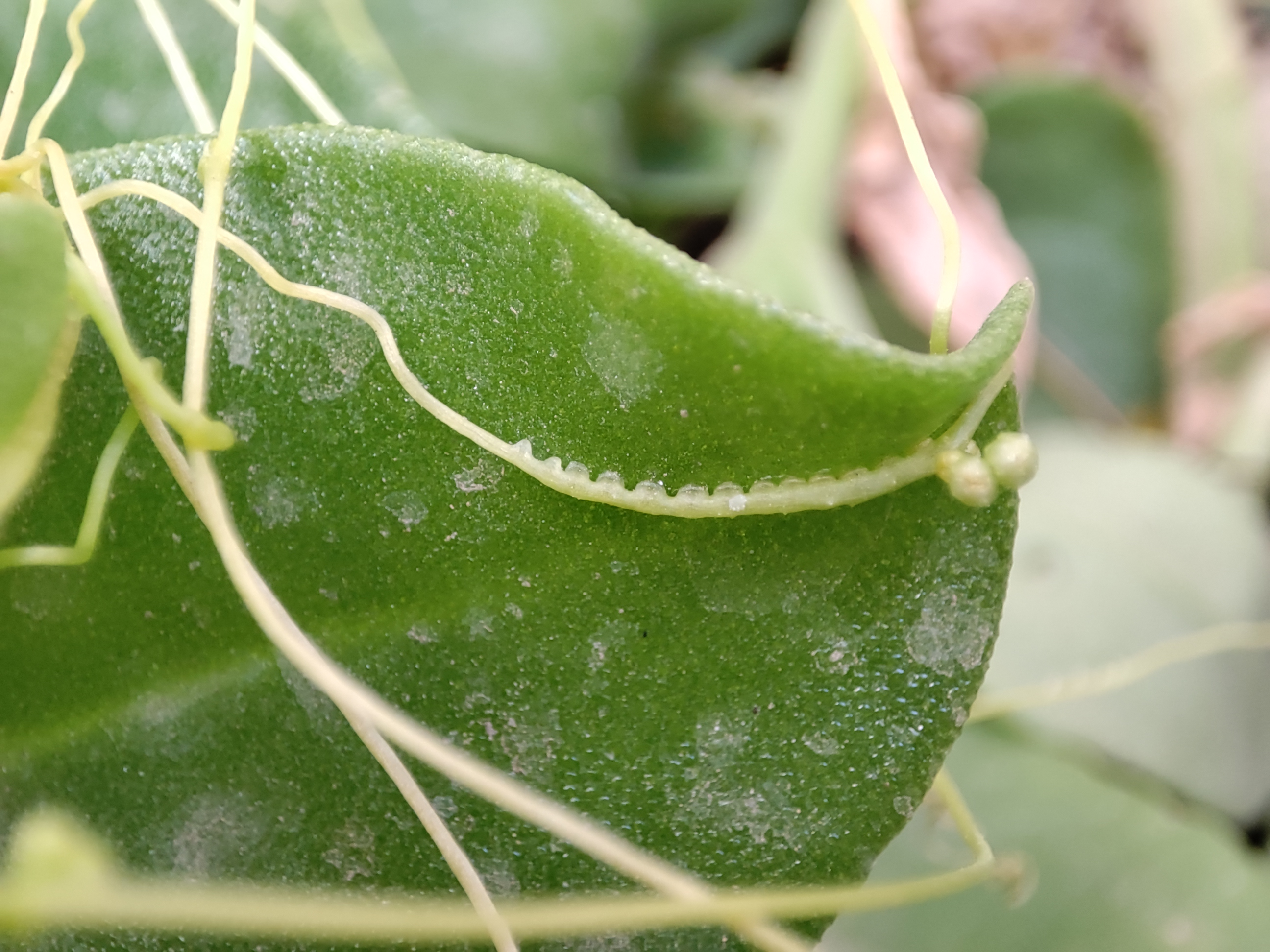
Cuscuta

Cuscuta (/kʌsˈkjuːtə/), commonly known as dodder or amarbel, is a genus of over 201 species of yellow, orange, or red (rarely green) parasitic plants. The genus possess minimal chlorophyll and utilize haustoria to extract nutrient and water from host's vascular system. Formerly treated as the only genus in the family Cuscutaceae, it now is accepted as belonging in the morning glory family, Convolvulaceae, on the basis of the work of the Angiosperm Phylogeny Group.

The genus is found throughout the temperate and tropical regions of the world, with the greatest species diversity in subtropical and tropical regions. Seedlings locate host plants by sensing volatile organic compounds. Many species are considered noxious weeds that are harmful to agriculture, and some are valued in traditional medicine.

Folk names include strangle tare, strangleweed, scaldweed, beggarweed, lady's laces, fireweed, wizard's net, devil's guts, devil's hair, devil's ringlet, goldthread, hailweed, hairweed, hellbine, love vine, pull-down, angel hair, and witch's hair.

== Description ==
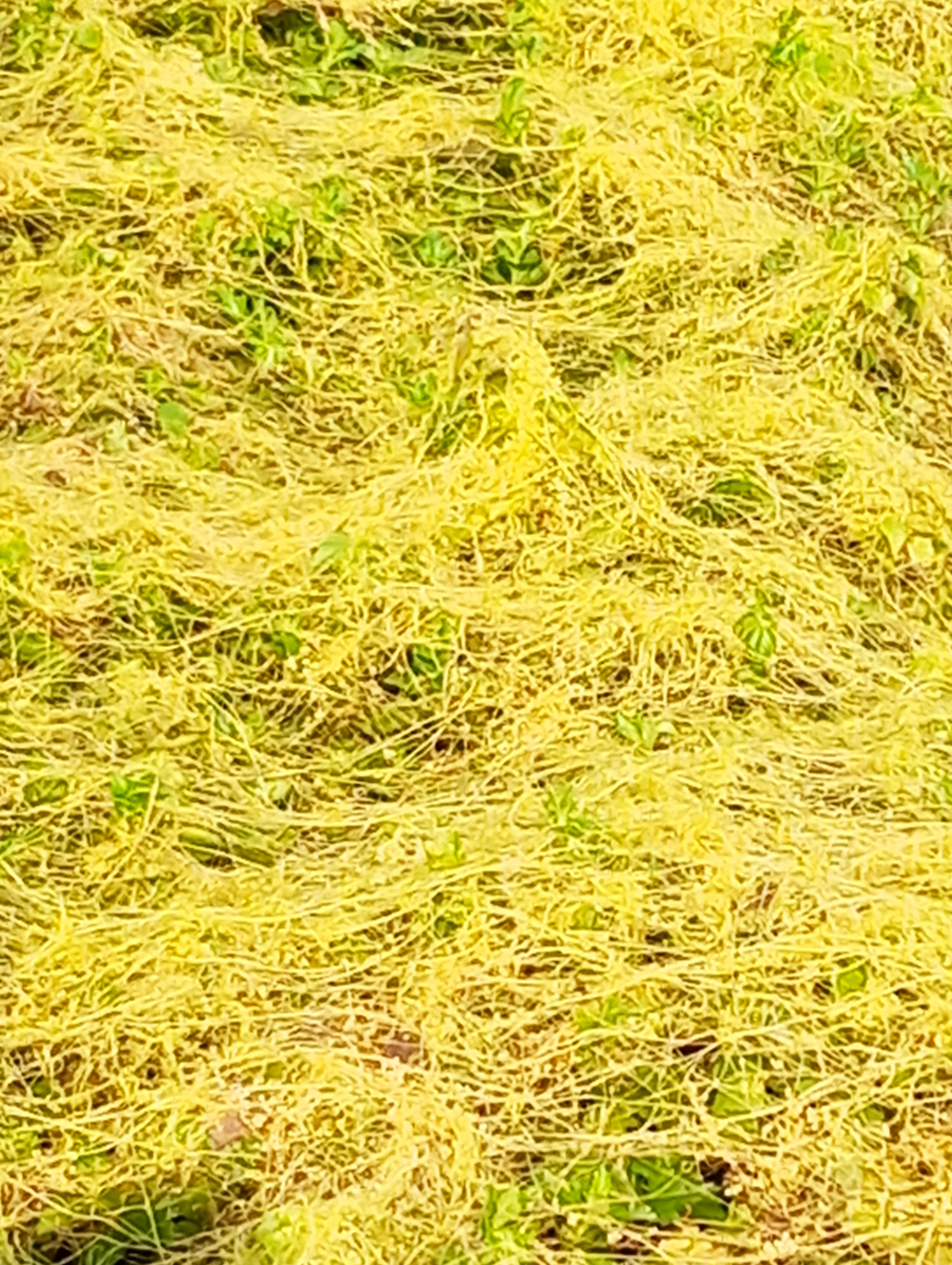
Cuscuta on creeper plant

Cuscuta can be identified by its thin stems of 1-3 mm in diameter appearing leafless, with the leaves reduced to minute scales. In these respects it closely resembles the similarly parasitic, but unrelated genus, Cassytha. From mid-summer to early autumn, the vines can produce small fruit that take the same color as the vine, and are approximately the size of a common pea. It has very low levels of chlorophyll; some species such as Cuscuta reflexa can photosynthesize slightly, while others such as C. europaea are entirely dependent on the host plants for nutrition.

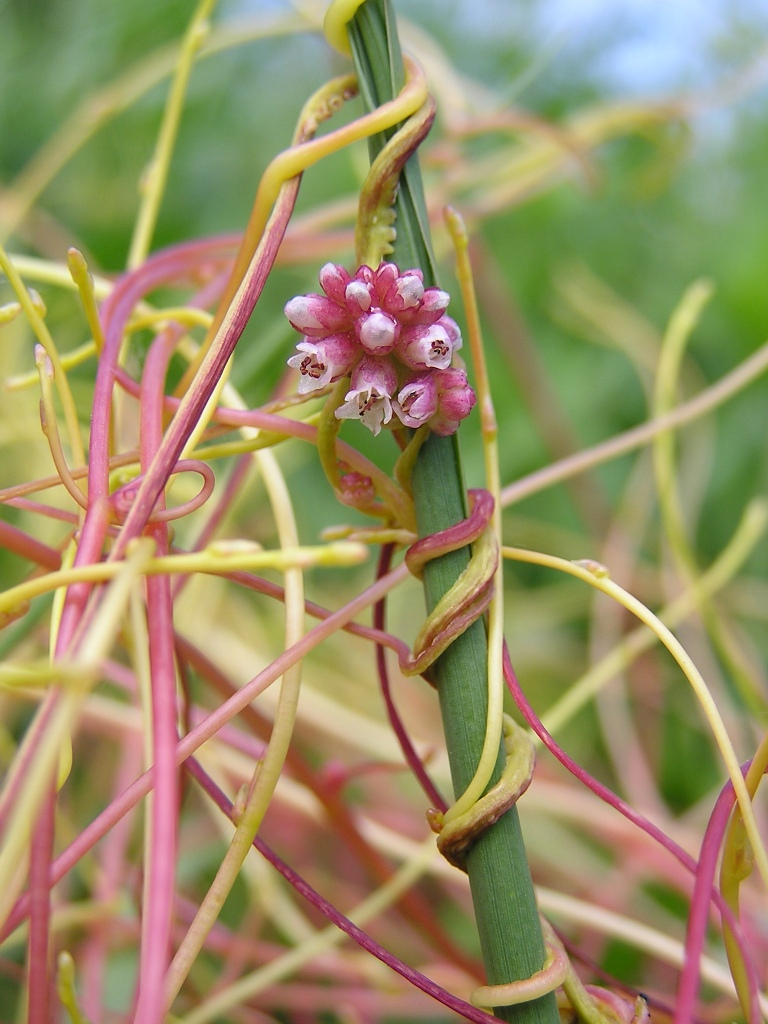
Cuscuta europaea in flower

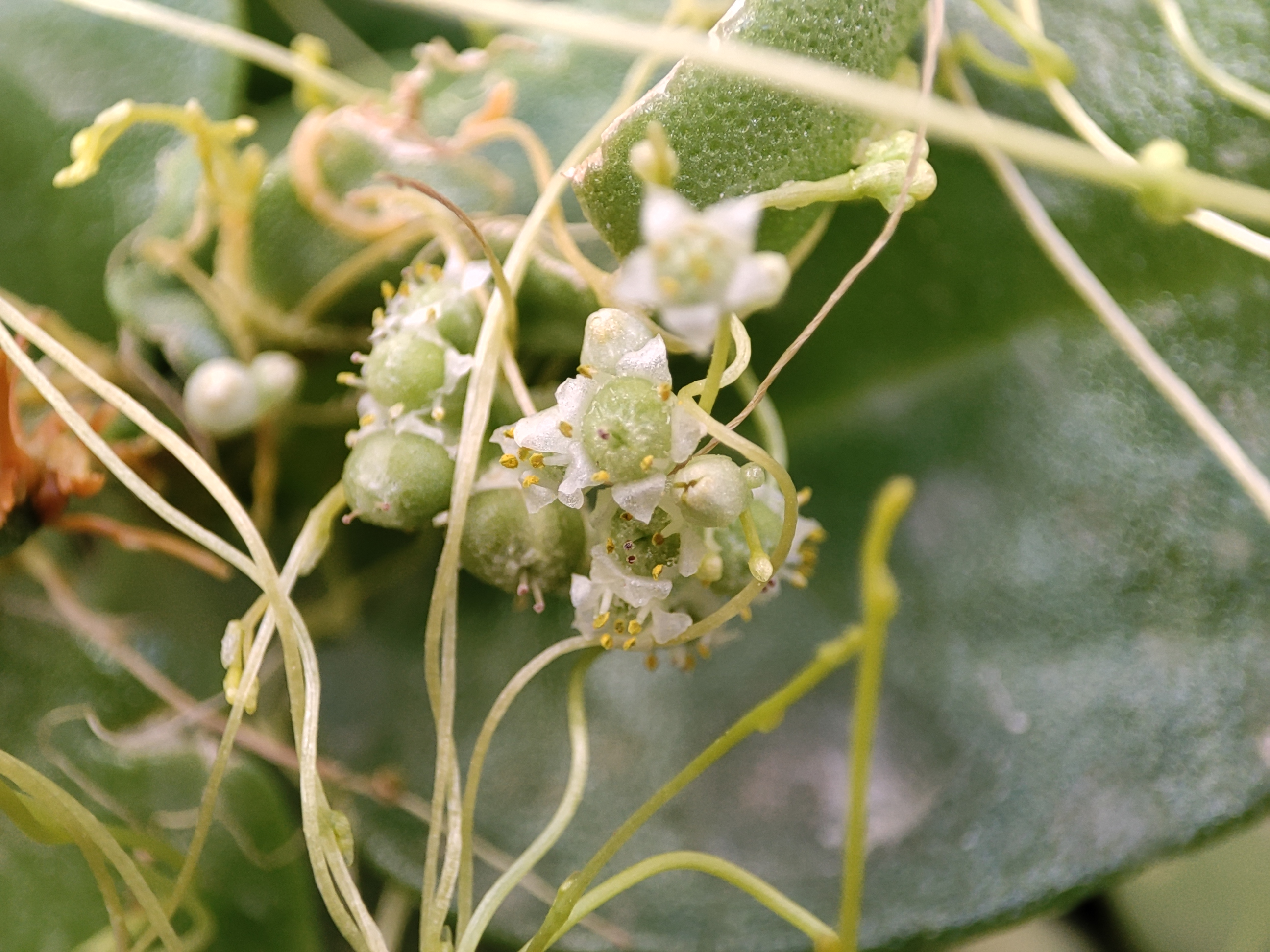
Cuscuta in Flower, Iran

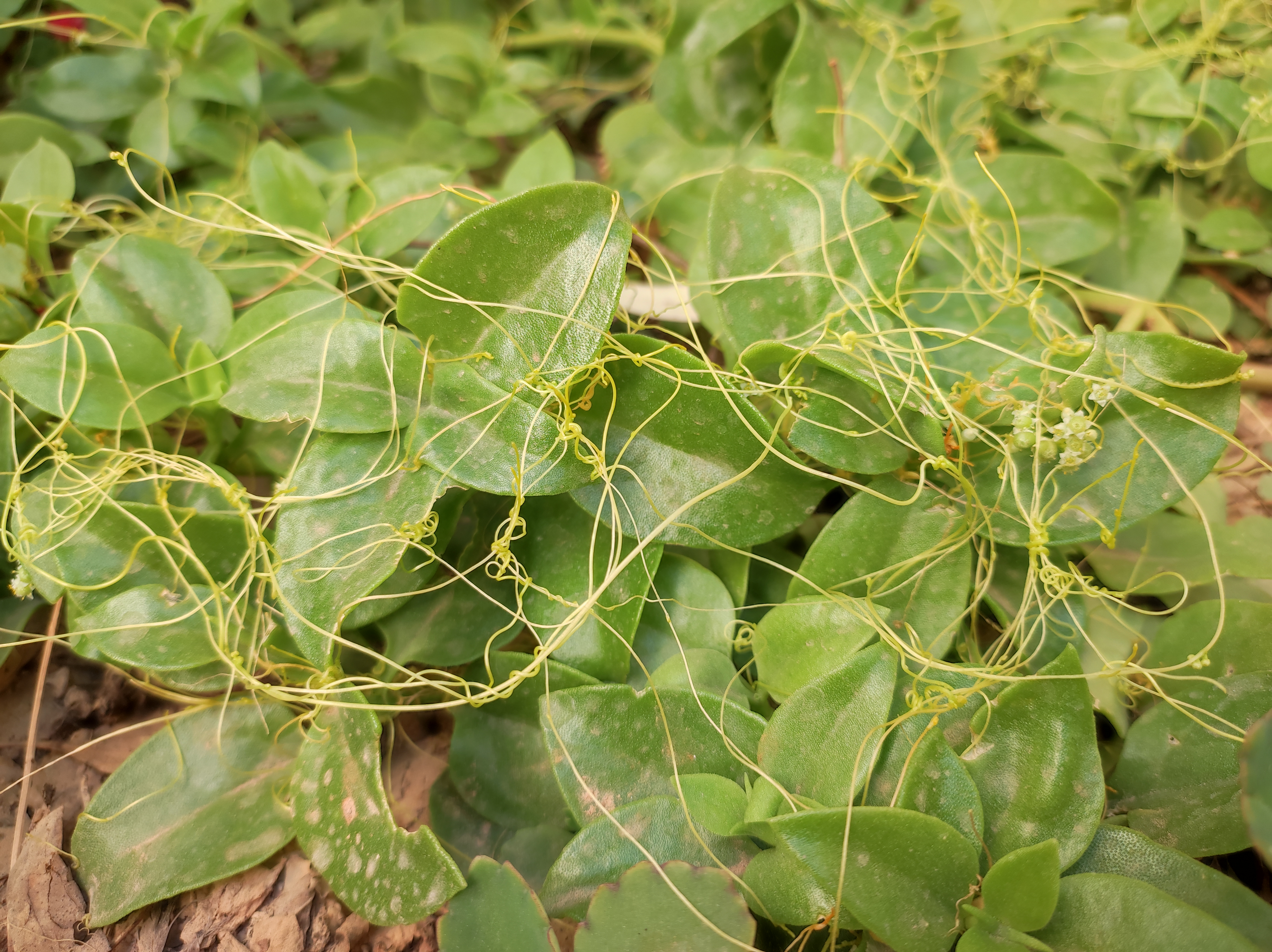
Dodder forming a net on its host

=== Flower and pollination ===
Dodder flowers range in color from white to pink to yellow to cream. Floral nectary has a typical structure, consisting of nectariferous parenchyma overlain by a cuticularized epidermis featuring a distinct band of modified stomata. In terms of pollination, most dodders are generalist except some species with long corolla tubes that specialized for insects with long mouthparts. Some flower in the early summer, others later, depending on the species. The seeds are minute and produced in large quantities. They have a hard coating, and typically can survive in the soil for 5–10 years, sometimes longer.

=== Germination ===
Dodder seeds sprout at or near the surface of the soil. Although dodder germination can occur without a host, it has to reach a green plant quickly and is adapted to grow towards the nearby plants by following chemosensory clues. If a plant is not reached within 5 to 10 days of germination, the dodder seedling will die. Before a host plant is reached, the dodder, as other plants, relies on food reserves in the embryo; the cotyledons, though present, are vestigial.

== Distribution and habitat ==
Cuscuta has a cosmopolitan distribution, distributed throughout both tropical and temperate regions. Approximately 75% of the species are native to the Americas (the New World). The genus ranges from deserts and saline environments to riparian and littoral zones. It is distributed from lowland grasslands and forests to disturbed sites and mountain regions. The genus is less common in cool temperate climates; for instance, only four species are native to northern Europe.

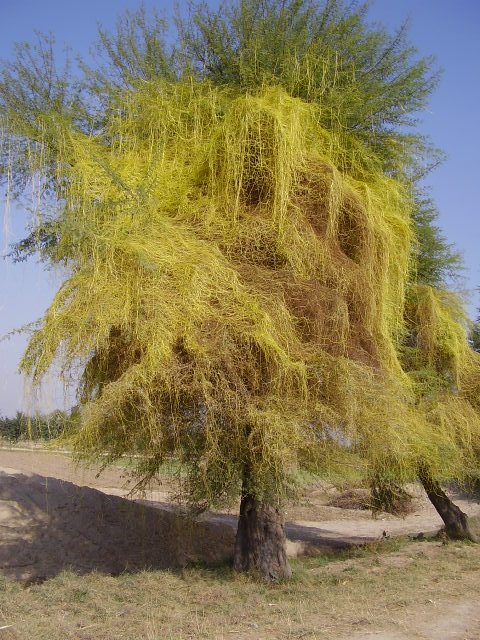
Cuscuta on Acacia in Punjab, Pakistan

== Parasitism ==
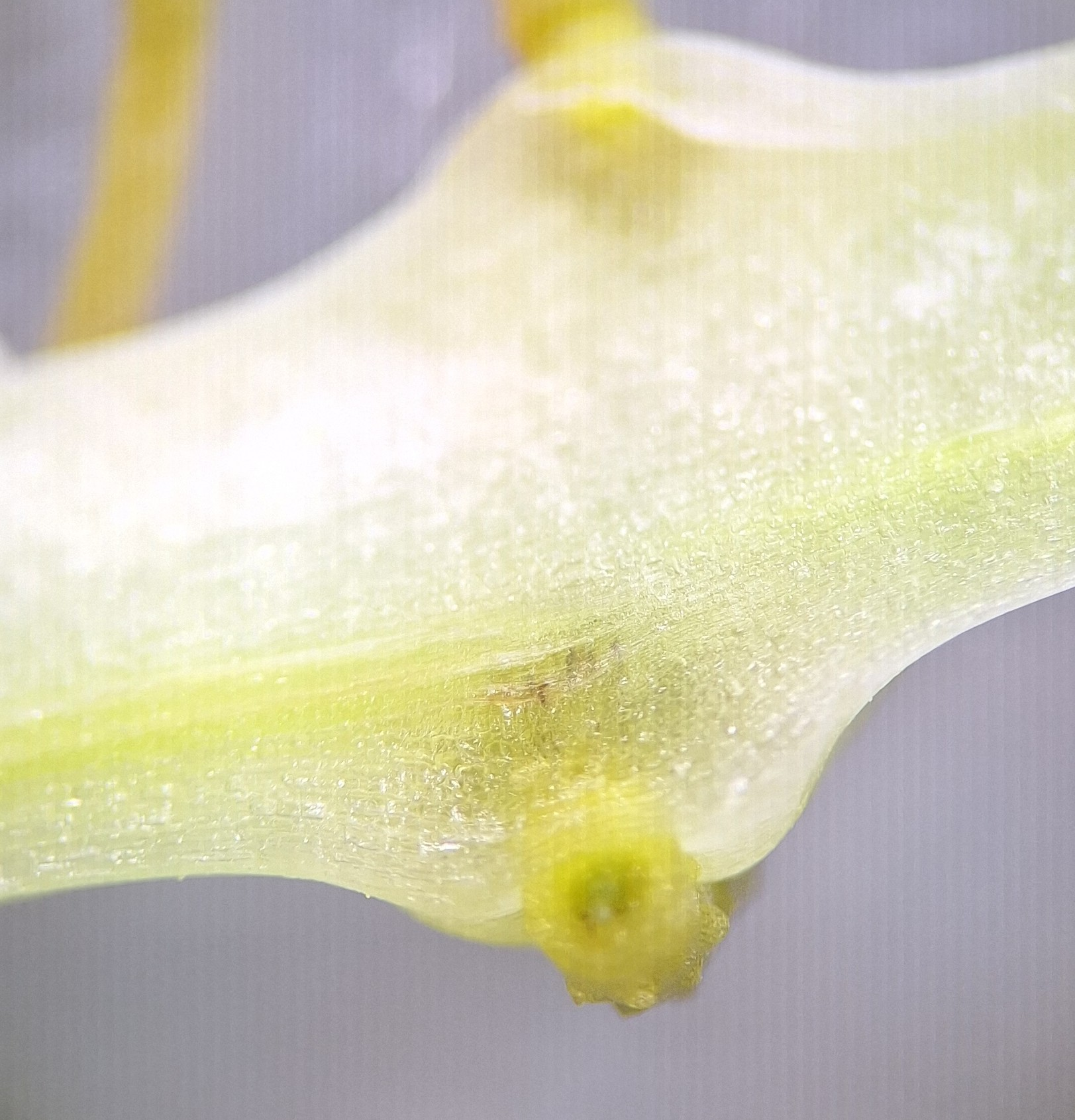
Cross-section image of Cuscuta pentagona penetrating the host plant Brassica napus

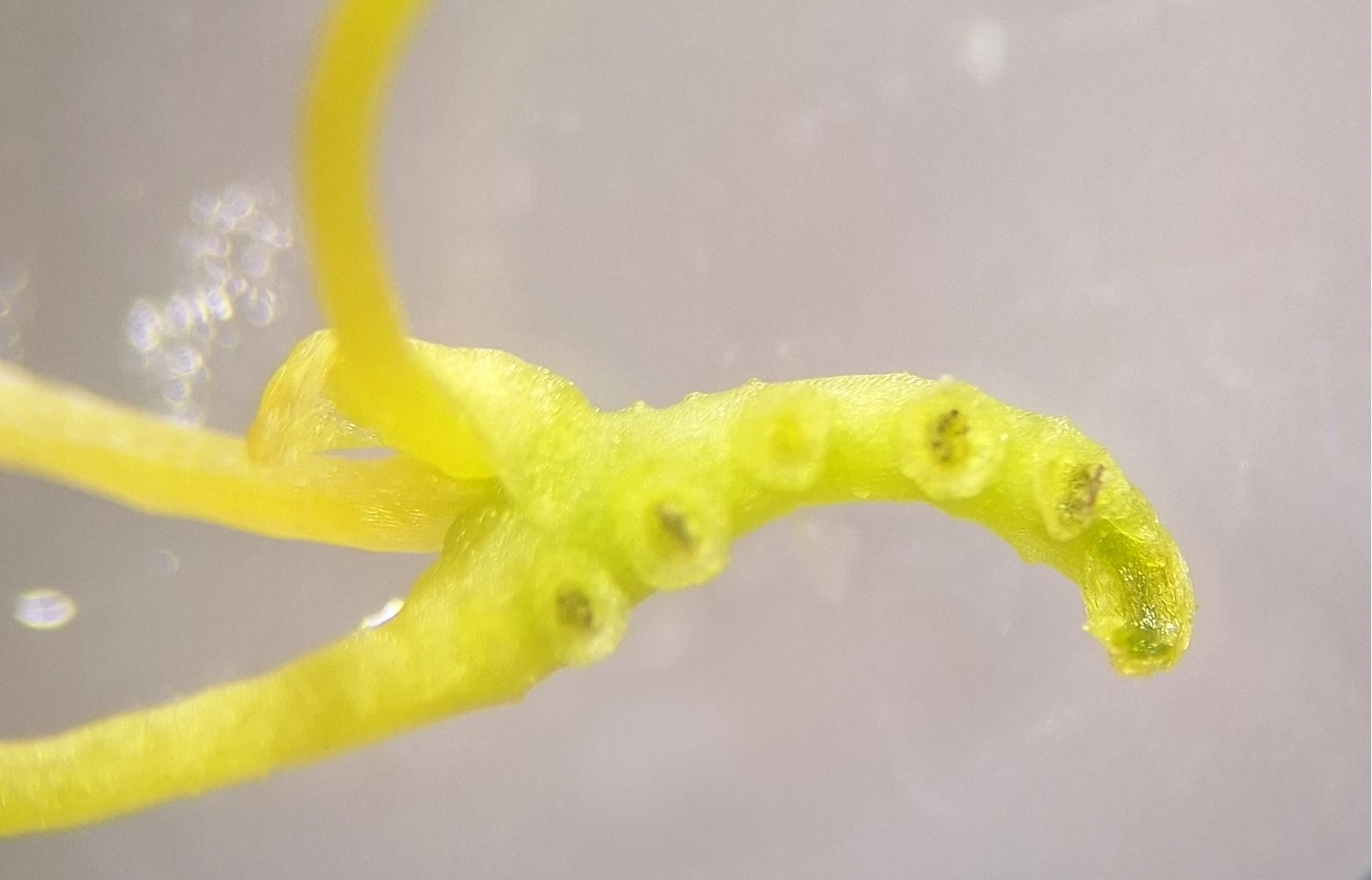
Micrograph of a detached Cuscuta pentagona haustorium

After a dodder attaches itself to a plant, it wraps itself around it. If the host contains food beneficial to dodder, the dodder produces haustoria that insert themselves into the vascular system of the host. Far-red light signal and physical contact with its host plant are required to initiate haustoria formation. The vestigial root of the dodder in the soil then dies. Through the developmental process of the haustoria, the dodder's searching hyphae reach the vascular tissue of the host and form plasmodesmata connections. In addition to water and nutrients, the exchange of mRNA, small RNA, and small peptides occurs between the host and the dodder through this connection.

=== Host range ===
Cuscuta species exhibit diverse host preferences; while some are generalists, others are specialists restricted to specific host groups. The genus is known to infect a wide range of plants, including a number of agricultural and horticultural crop species, such as alfalfa, sugar beet, lespedeza, flax, clover, potatoes, chrysanthemum, dahlia, helenium, trumpet vine, ivy and petunias. As an ectoparasite and holoparasitic plant, or a plant that is non-photosynthetic and is completely dependent on a host. The dodder can grow and attach itself to multiple plants. In tropical areas, it can grow more or less continuously and may reach high into the canopy of shrubs and trees; in cold temperate regions, it is an annual plant and is restricted to relatively low vegetation that can be reached by new seedlings each spring.

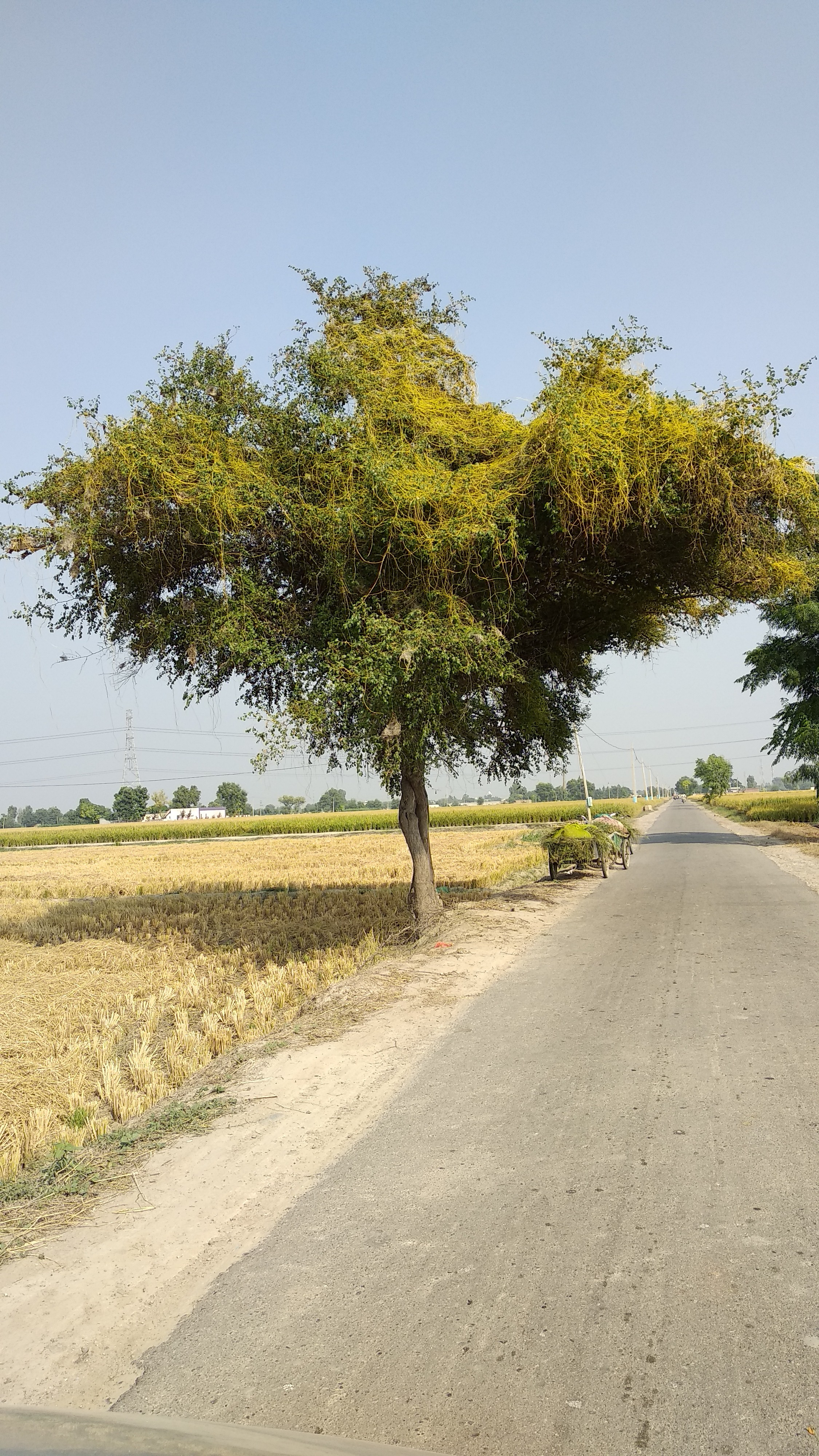
Cuscuta on a Chinese date tree in Punjab, India

Diagram illustrating how Cuscuta uses haustoria to penetrate the vascular system of its host plant and remove sugars and nutrients from the host's phloem. [Note: twining direction is reversed from that shown in this illustration.] 1). Cuscuta plant 2). Host plant 3). Cuscuta leaves 4). Ground tissue 5). Phloem 6). Sugars and nutrients 7). Epidermal tissue 8). A Cuscuta haustorium growing into the phloem of the host plant.

=== Host detection ===
A report published in Science in 2006 demonstrated that dodder use airborne volatile organic compound cues to locate their host plants. Seedlings of C. pentagona exhibit positive growth responses to volatiles released by tomato and other species of host plants. When given a choice between volatiles released by the preferred host tomato and the non-host wheat, the parasite grew toward the former. Further experiments demonstrated attraction to a number of individual compounds released by host plants and repellence by one compound released by wheat. These results do not rule out the possibility that other cues, such as light, may also play a role in host location.

== Host defenses ==
Less is known about host defenses against dodder and other parasitic plants than is known about plant defenses against herbivores and pathogens. In one study, tomato plants were found to employ complex mechanisms to defend against dodder. Two pathways, using jasmonic acid and salicylic acid, were activated in response to attack by Cuscuta pentagona. Dodder attack was also found to induce production of volatiles, including 2-carene, α-pinene, limonene, and β-phellandrene. It is not known if or how these volatiles defend the host, but they could potentially interfere with the dodder's ability to locate and select hosts. Also, the presence of trichomes on the tomato stem effectively blocks the dodder from attaching to the stem.

== Agricultural impact and management ==
Dodder ranges in severity based on its species and the species of the host, the time of attack, and whether any viruses are also present in the host plant. By debilitating the host plant, dodder decreases the ability of plants to resist viral diseases, and dodder can also spread plant diseases from one host to another if it is attached to more than one plant. This is of economic concern in agricultural systems, where an annual drop of 10% yield can be devastating. There has been an emphasis on dodder vine control in order to manage plant diseases in the field.

Many countries have laws prohibiting import of dodder seed, requiring crop seeds to be free of dodder seed contamination. Before planting, all clothes should be inspected for dodder seed when moving from an infested area to a non-infested crop. When dealing with an infested area, swift action is necessary. Recommendations include planting a non-host crop for several years after the infestation, pulling up host crops immediately, particularly before the dodder produces seed, and use of preemergent herbicides such as Dacthal in the spring. Examples of non-host crops include grasses and many other monocotyledons. If dodder is found before it chokes a host plant, it may be simply removed from the soil. If choking has begun, the host plant must be pruned significantly below the dodder infestation, as dodder is versatile and able to grow back from its haustoria.

== Use in Chinese traditional medicine ==
C. chinensis seeds (simplified Chinese: 菟丝子; traditional Chinese: 菟絲子; pinyin: túsīzǐ) have long been used for osteoporosis in China and some other Asian countries. C. chinensis is a commonly used traditional Chinese medicine which is believed to strengthen the liver and kidneys. Cuscuta species are also used as medicine in Himalayan regional medical traditions.

== See also ==
- List of Cuscuta species

== Gallery ==
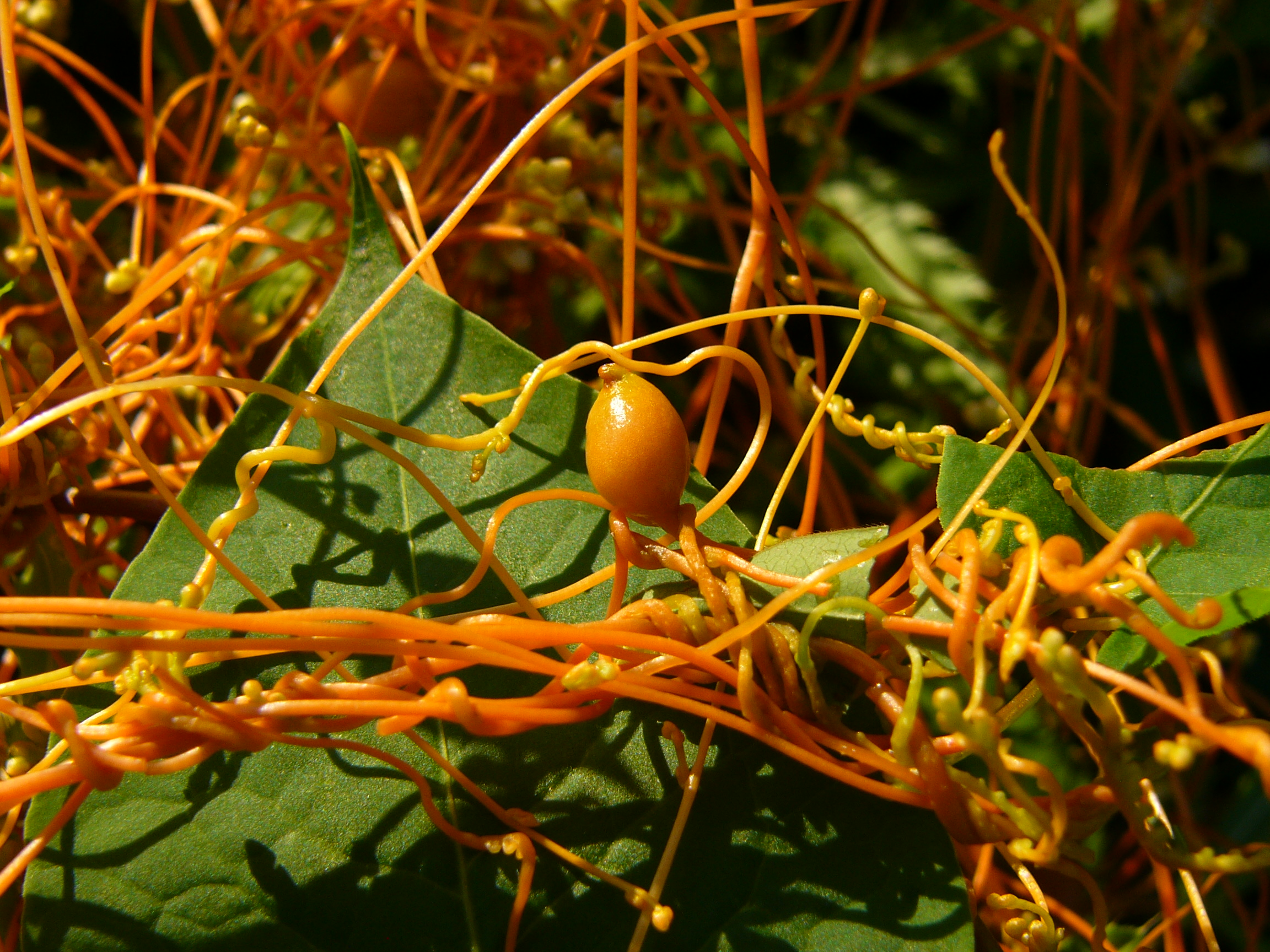
Cuscuta sp. with a gall

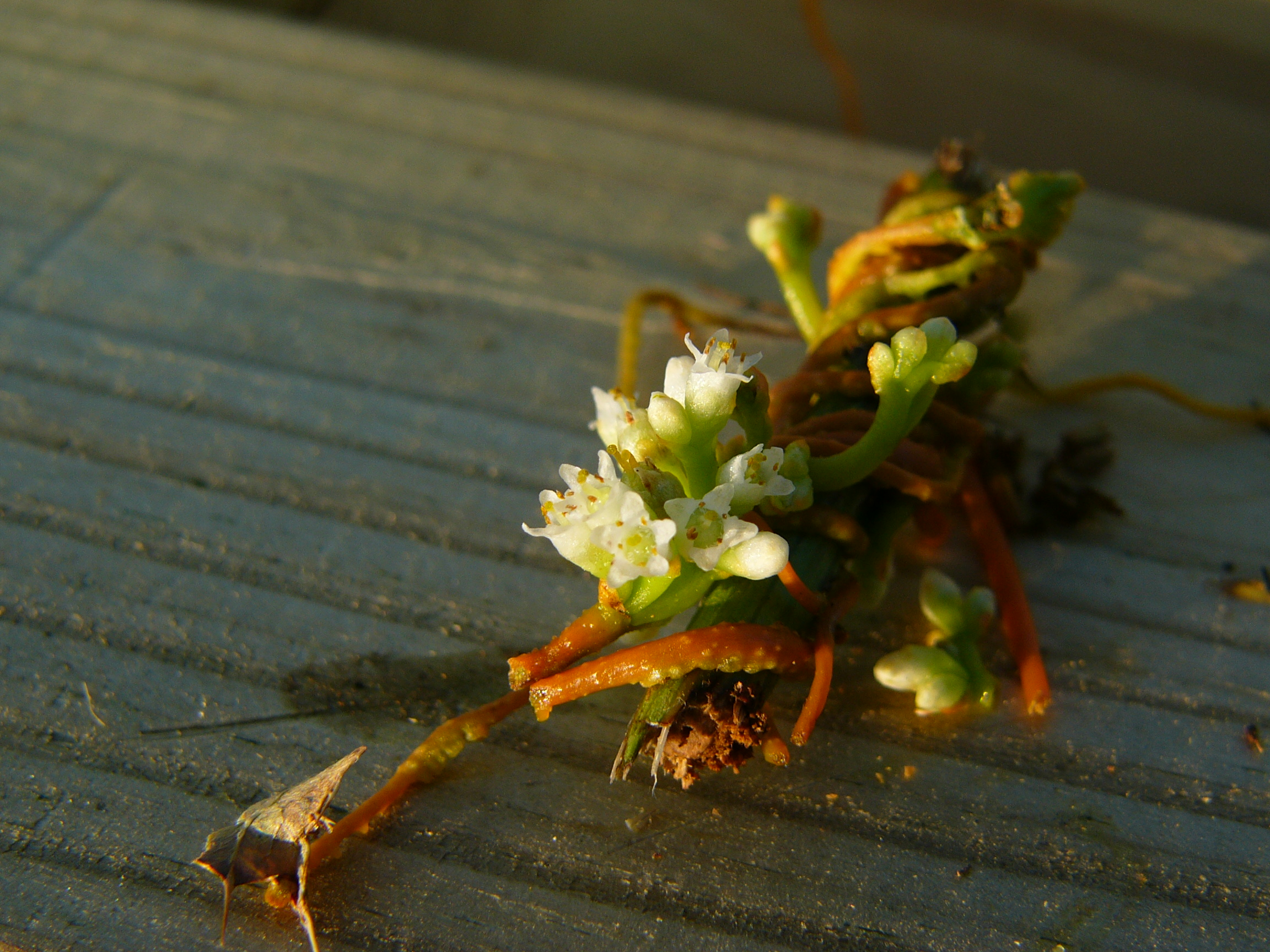
Cuscuta sp. flowers

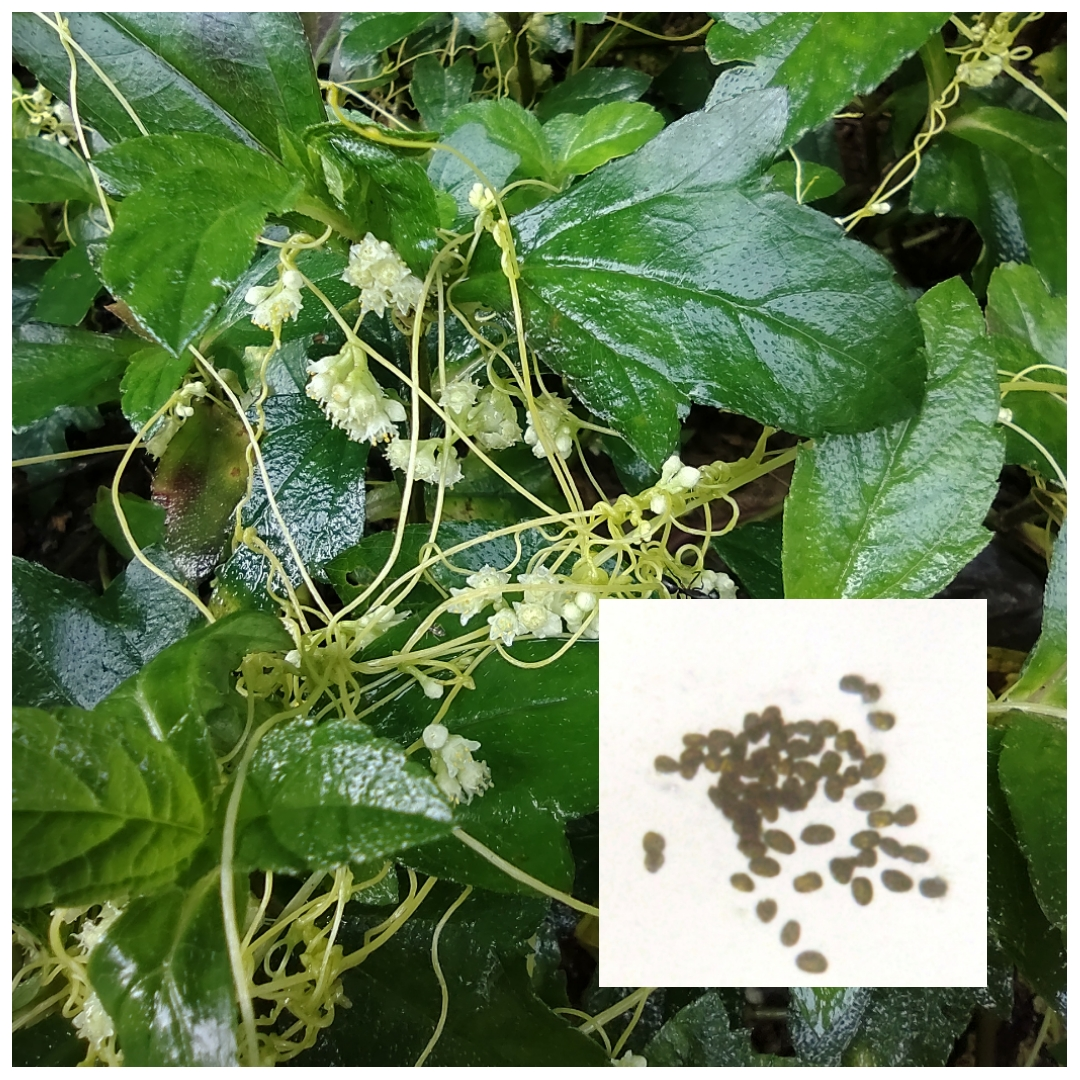
Flowers and pollen grains of Cuscuta from Mumbai, India

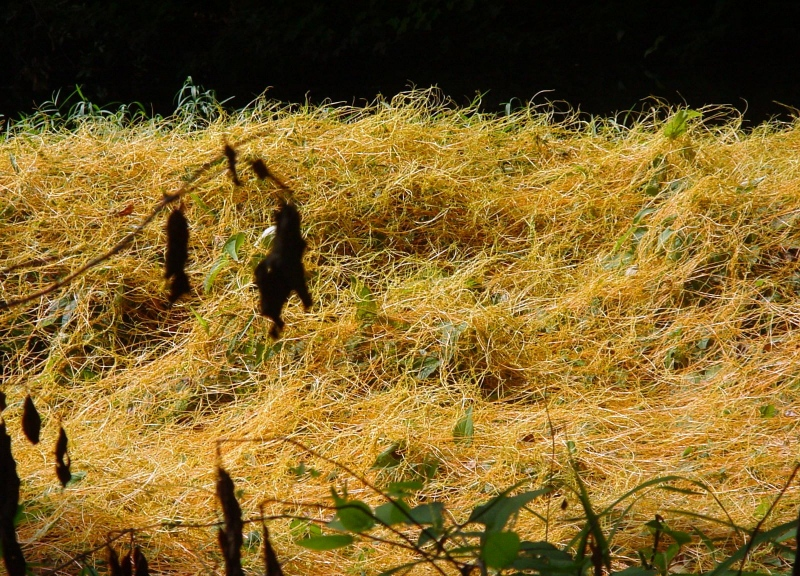
Cuscuta sp. form

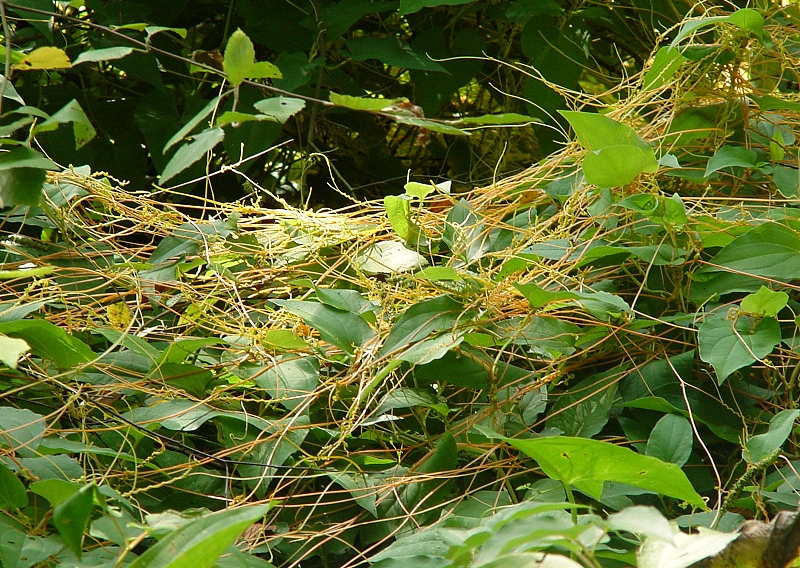
Cuscuta sp. form

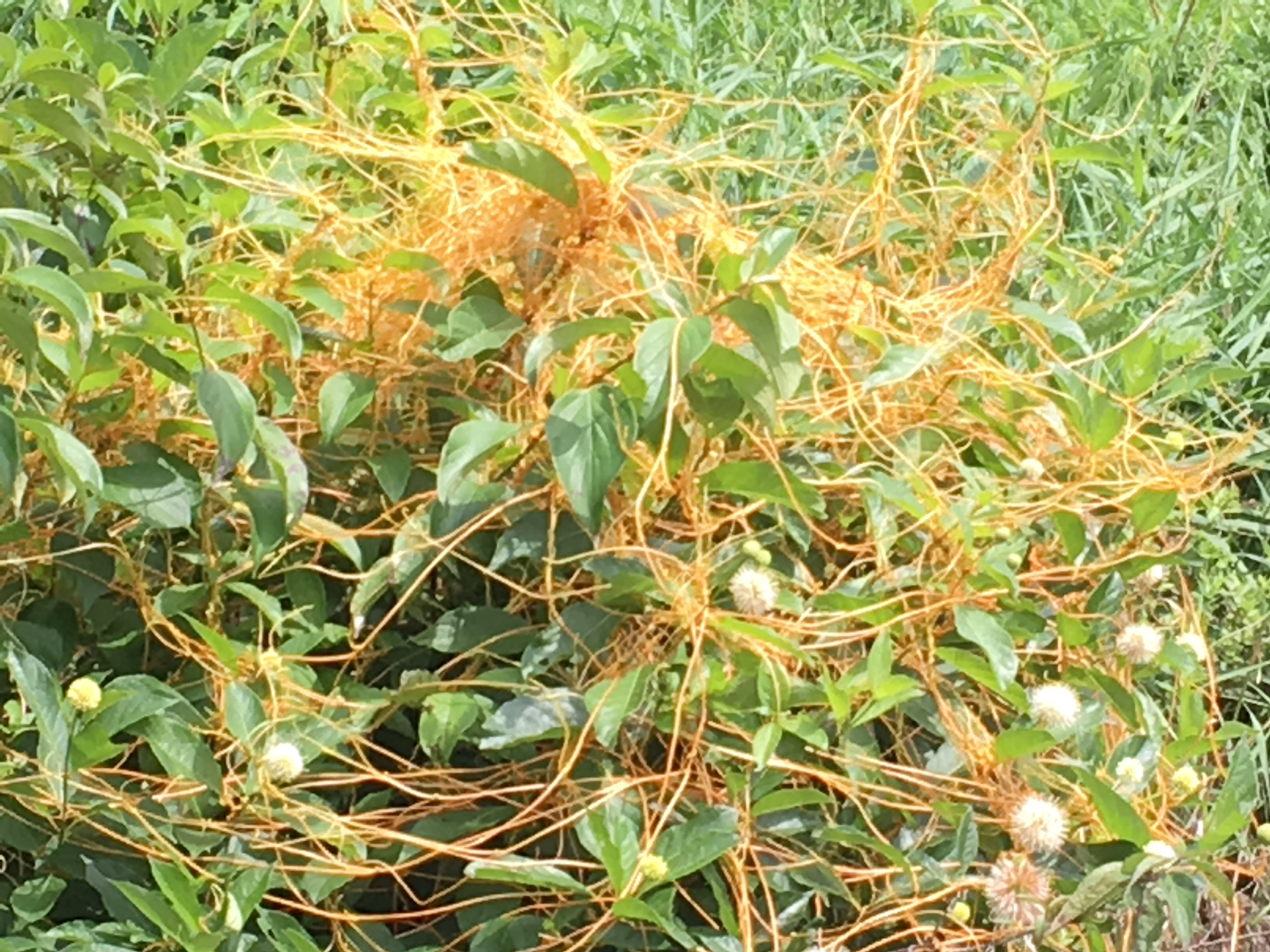
Cuscuta sp. form

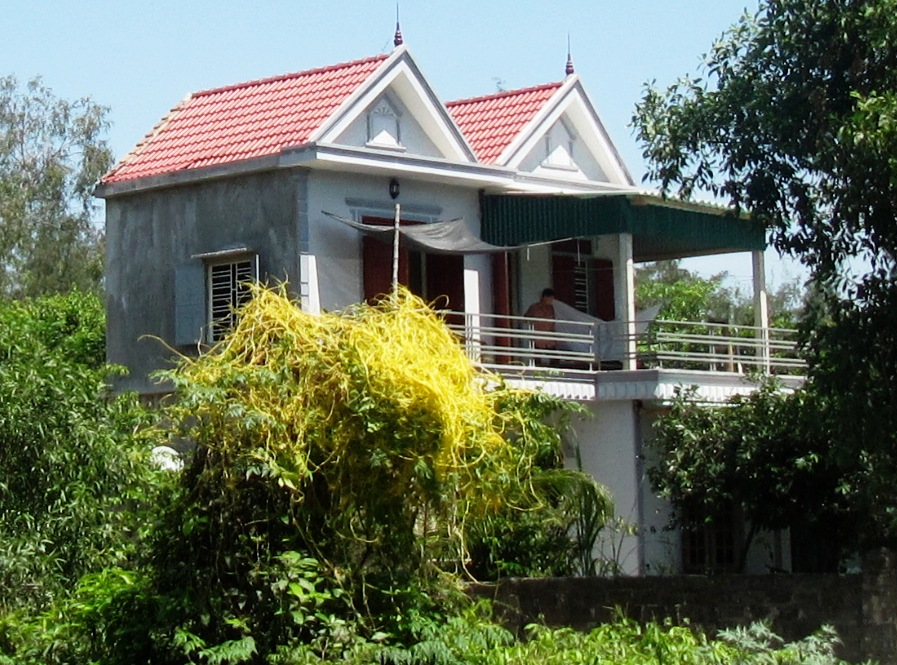
Cuscuta sp. form

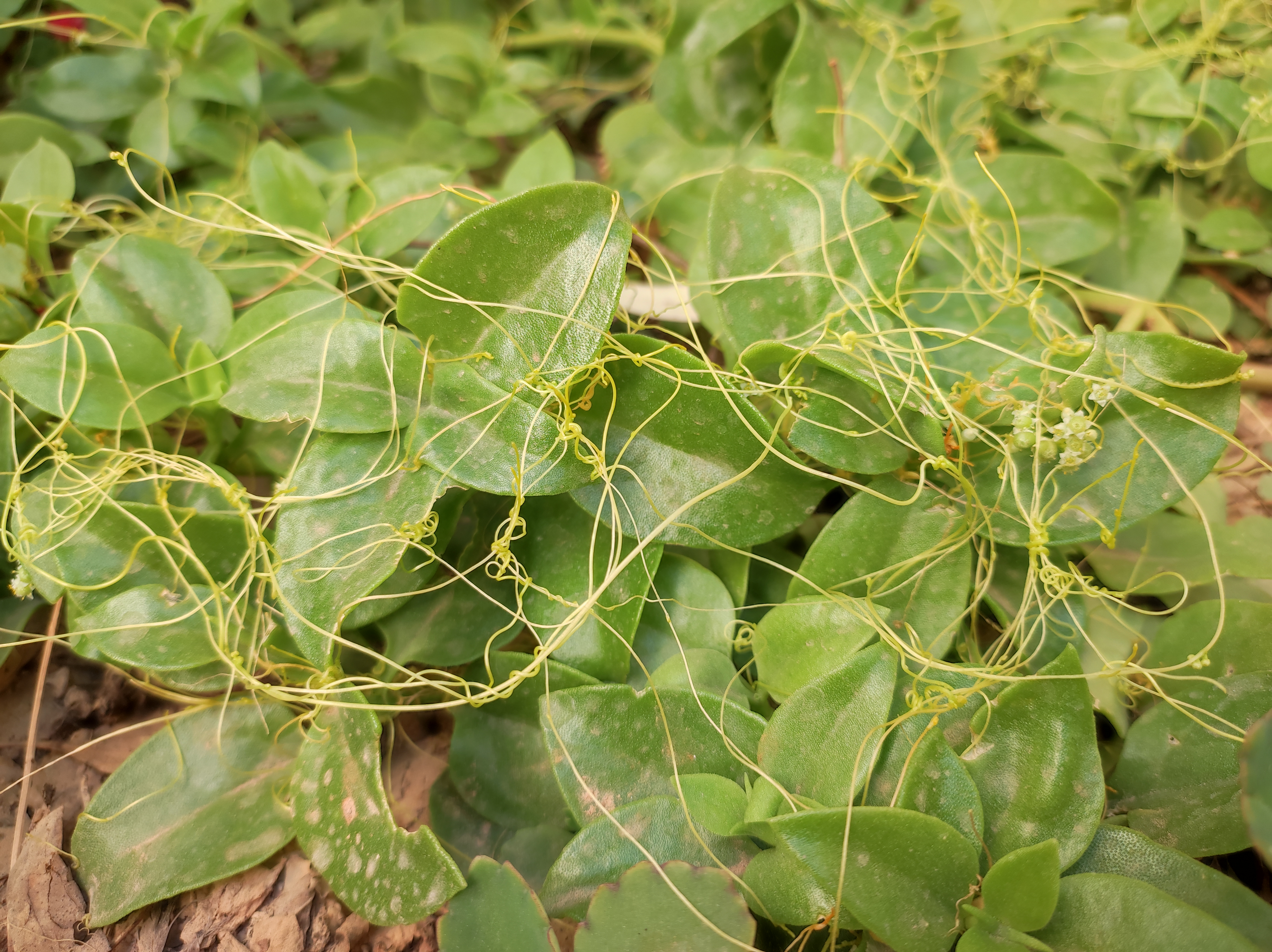
Dodder Forming a Net on its Host

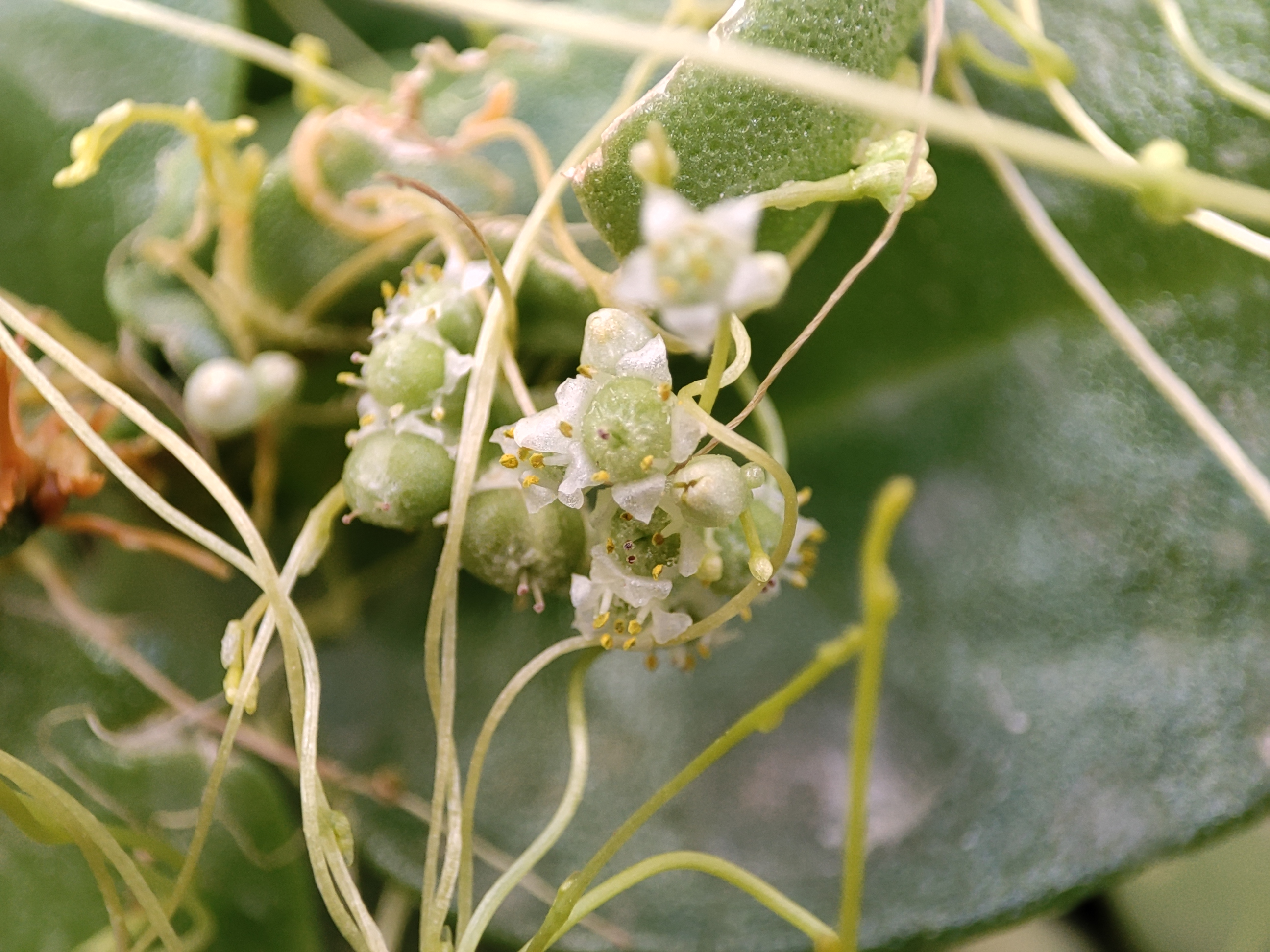
Cuscuta in Flower, Iran
