= Insam =

Insam may refer to:

- Ginseng, also known as "insam", an alternative name borrowed from the Korean language
- Insam-cha, a Korean tisane (herbal tea) made from ginseng

People with the family name Insam include:

- Adolf Insam (born 1951), Italian ice hockey player and coach
- Evelyn Insam (born 1994), Italian ski jumper
- Grita Insam, Austrian gallerist, recipient of a 2009 Austrian Decoration for Science and Art
- Marco Insam (born 1989), Italian professional ice hockey player
