= Panax vietnamensis =

Scientific classification
- Kingdom: Plantae
- Clade: Tracheophytes
- Clade: Angiosperms
- Clade: Eudicots
- Clade: Asterids
- Order: Apiales
- Family: Araliaceae
- Genus: Panax
- Subgenus: Panax subg. Panax
- Species: P. vietnamensis

Binomial name
- Panax vietnamensis Ha & Grushv.

Synonyms
- Panax vietnamensis var. fuscidiscus K.Komatsu, S.Zhu & S.Q.Cai

Species of flowering plant

Panax vietnamensis or Vietnamese ginseng (Vietnamese: Sâm Ngọc Linh, lit. 'Ngọc Linh ginseng') is a species of the ginseng genus Panax. In Vietnam the species, prized in herbal medicine, is commercially very valuable and now considered threatened.

== Description ==
Panax vietnamensis is a perennial plant, growing from 40 centimetres (16 in) to 1 metre (3 ft 3 in) tall. It may be distinguished from other ginseng species by the notches on its roots.

== Distribution and habitat ==
In Vietnam, P. vietnamensis is found primarily in the Mount Ngọc Linh area of Quảng Ngãi province and Da Nang, from which its local name is derived. It is also found in the Mount Ngọc Lum Heo and Mount Ngọc Am areas of Quảng Nam Province. Its habitat is areas under jungle leaf canopy or near running water, at altitudes above 1,200 metres (4,000 ft). The species is also reported from central and southern provinces of China.

== Threats ==
Panax vietnamensis faces a number of threats to its survival as a species in Vietnam. With increased demand from the herbal medicine industry, locals have over-harvested the plant in the wild. The species is slow-growing, taking around 10 years to reach maturity. Larger-scale commercial farming operations have been affected by theft of the plants. False ginseng seeds have been introduced to the Mount Ngọc Linh area in an attempt to be grown and sold as P. vietnamensis. The introduced strains mature in a much shorter time and can be grown at lower altitudes. Scientists are concerned that these strains may mix with and compromise purebred P. vietnamensis.

== Commercial projects ==
In 1979 the provincial government of Quảng Nam (present-day Da Nang cIty) established the Tra Linh Drug Materials Farm in a forested area on Mount Ngọc Linh. The project, delayed for many years, has recently cultivated large numbers of Ngọc Linh ginseng plants for sale to a local pharmaceutical company. However theft of mature plants has been an ongoing threat.

In Quảng Ngãi province (former Kon Tum province), a conservation centre was established in 2004 to grow and preserve the plant. Initially an area of 10 hectares (20 acres) has been planted. It is hoped to increase this to 500 hectares (1,236 acres) under cultivation by 2015.

== DNA ==
Panax vietnamensis is sympatric with other Panax species and has a close relationship with P. japonicus var. major and P. pseudo-ginseng subsp. himalaicus.
