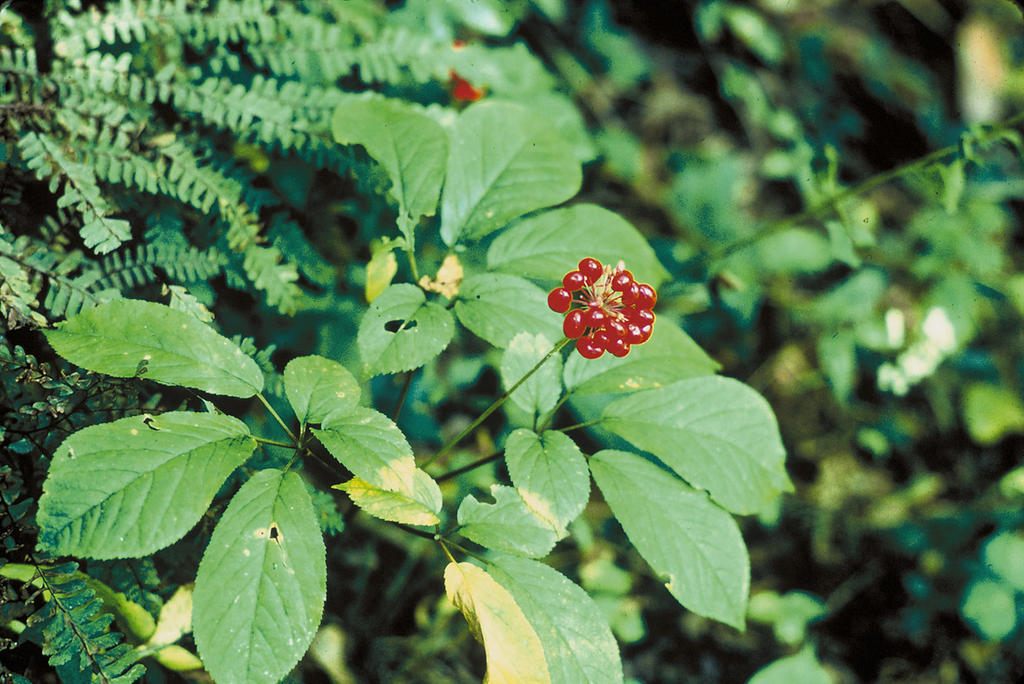
- Panax quinquefolius

Scientific classification
- Kingdom: Plantae
- Clade: Tracheophytes
- Clade: Angiosperms
- Clade: Eudicots
- Clade: Asterids
- Order: Apiales
- Family: Araliaceae
- Subfamily: Aralioideae
- Genus: Panax; L.

Species
- See text

= Panax =

Genus of plants

The Panax (ginseng) genus belongs to the Araliaceae (ivy) family. Panax species are characterized by the presence of ginsenosides and gintonin. Panax is one of approximately 60 plant genera with a classical disjunct east Asian and east North American distribution. Furthermore, this disjunct distribution is asymmetric as only two of the ~18 species in genus are native to North America.

== Etymology ==
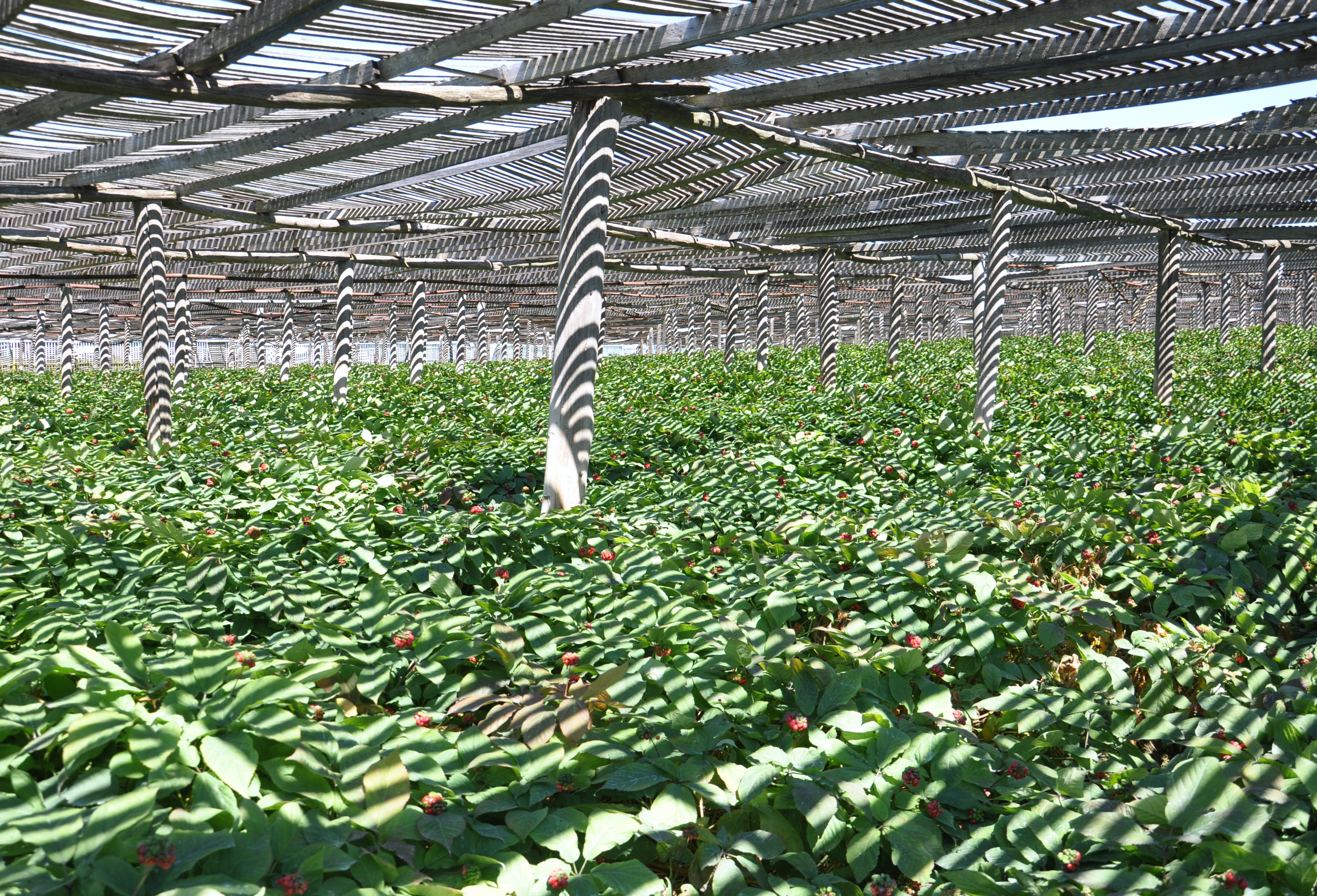
American ginseng at Monk Garden in Wisconsin .

The name Panax, meaning "all-healing" in Greek, shares the same origin as "panacea" and was used for this genus because Carl Linnaeus was aware of its wide use in Chinese medicine.

== Panax species ==
Genus Panax

Subgenus Panax

Section Panax

Series Notoginseng

Panax notoginseng (Burkill) F.H.Chen (san qi, tian qi or tien chi)

Series Panax

Panax arunachalensis Taram, A.P.Das & Tag (Arunachal Pradesh)
Panax assamicus (Assam Ginseng)
Panax bipinnatifidus Seem. ("Bipinnatifid")

var. angustifolius (Burkill) J.Wen ("Narrow-leaved")

Panax ginseng C.A.Mey. (Asian ginseng, Chinese ginseng, Korean ginseng, Asiatic ginseng, Oriental ginseng)
Panax japonicus (T.Nees) C.A.Mey. (Japanese ginseng)
Panax quinquefolius L. (American ginseng) – – Eastern North America
Panax sokpayensis Shiva K.Sharma & Pandit (Skiikm Himalaya / Sokpa)
Panax siamensis J. Wen, 2023 (Siamese)
Panax vietnamensis Ha & Grushv. (Vietnamese)
Panax wangianus S.C.Sun (Wang's) – Range: Arunachal Pradesh to China (Sichuan)
Panax zingiberensis C.Y.Wu & Feng ("Ginger-shaped")

Section Pseudoginseng

Panax pseudoginseng Wall. ("Pseudoginseng")
Panax stipuleanatus H.T.Tsai & K.M.Feng ("Stipuled")

Subgenus Trifolius

Panax trifolius L. ("Trefoil") – Eastern North America

Hybrids:

- Panax ginseng × Panax quinquifolius (F1 male sterile, roots bigger than parents)
- Panax japonicus f. typicum × Panax quinquifolius

== Phylogeny ==
Based on chloroplast genomes (Manzanilla et al. 2018 and Xia et al. 2025):

- Aralia
- - P. trifolius
  - - - P. bipinnatifidus
      - P. stipuleanatus
    - - - P. quinquefolius
        - P. ginseng
      - - P. notoginseng
        - - - P. pseudoginseng
            - - P. japonicus
              - P. major
          - - P. wangianus
            - - P. zingiberensis
              - P. vietnamensis

Note: Plants of the World Online treats P. major (Burkill) C. Y. Wu & K. M. Feng as a junior synonym of P. bipinnatifidus. Flora of China treats it as P. japonicus var. major (Burkill) C. Y. Wu & K. M. Feng.

== Gallery ==
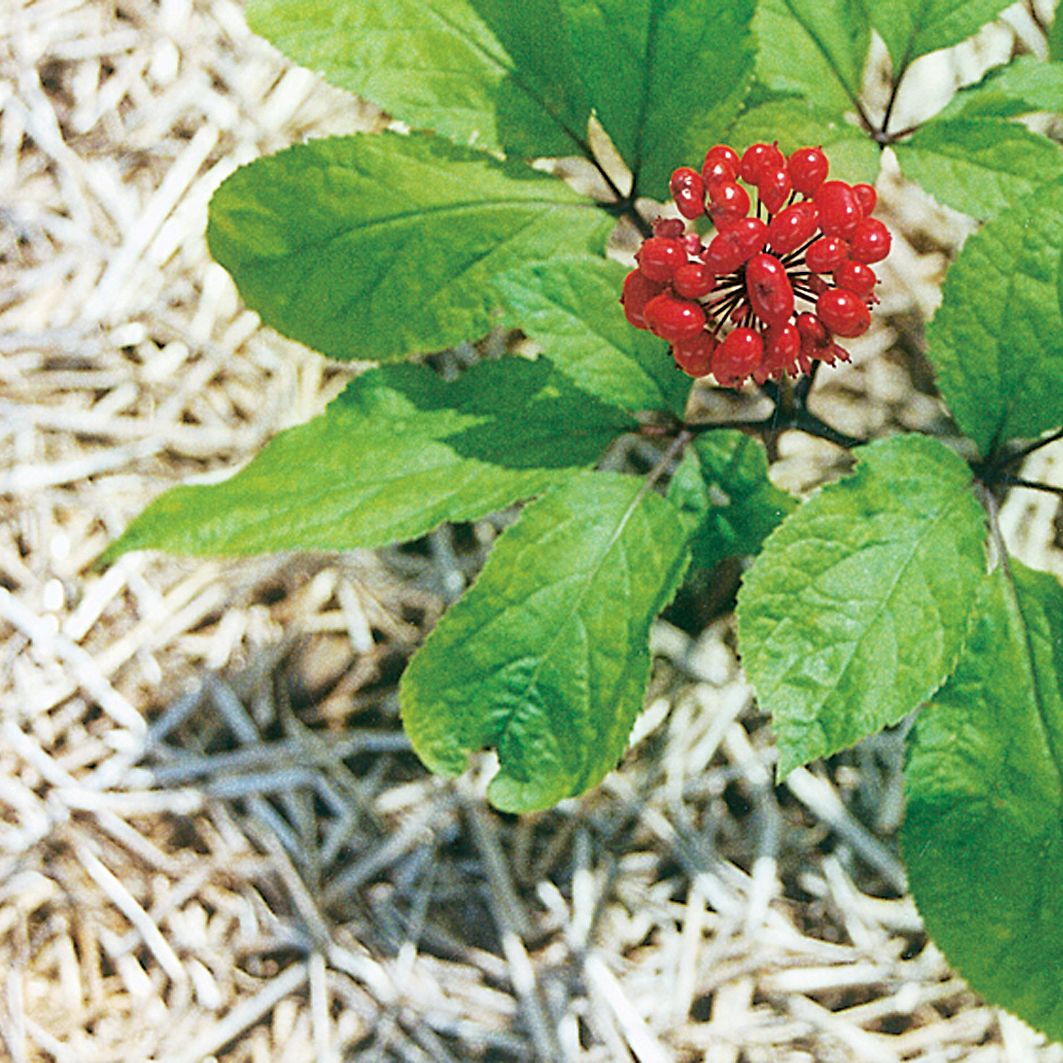

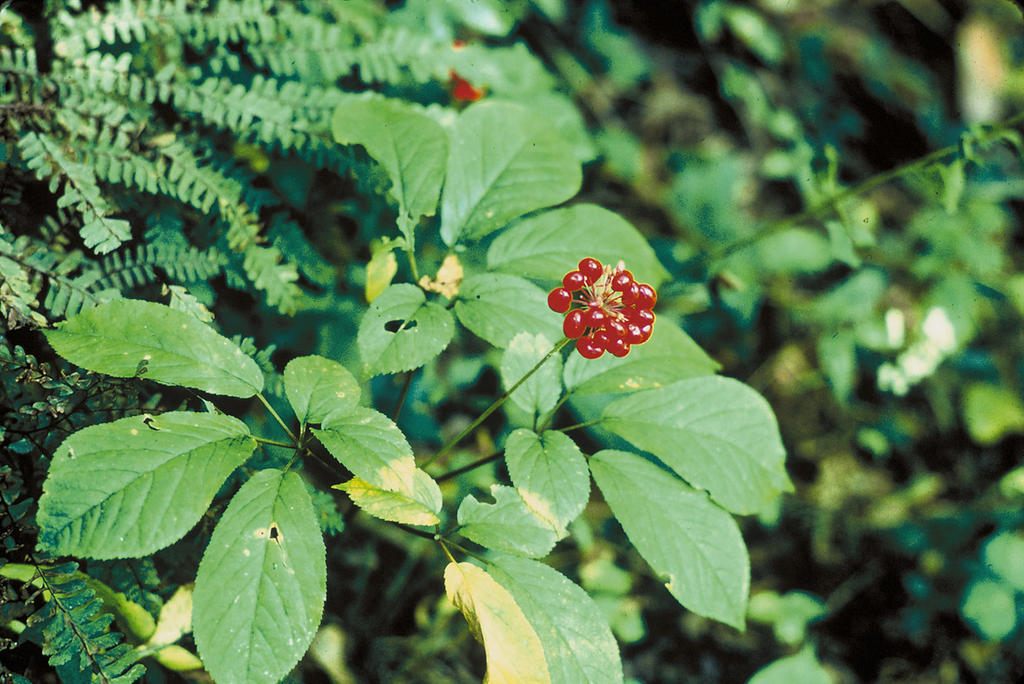

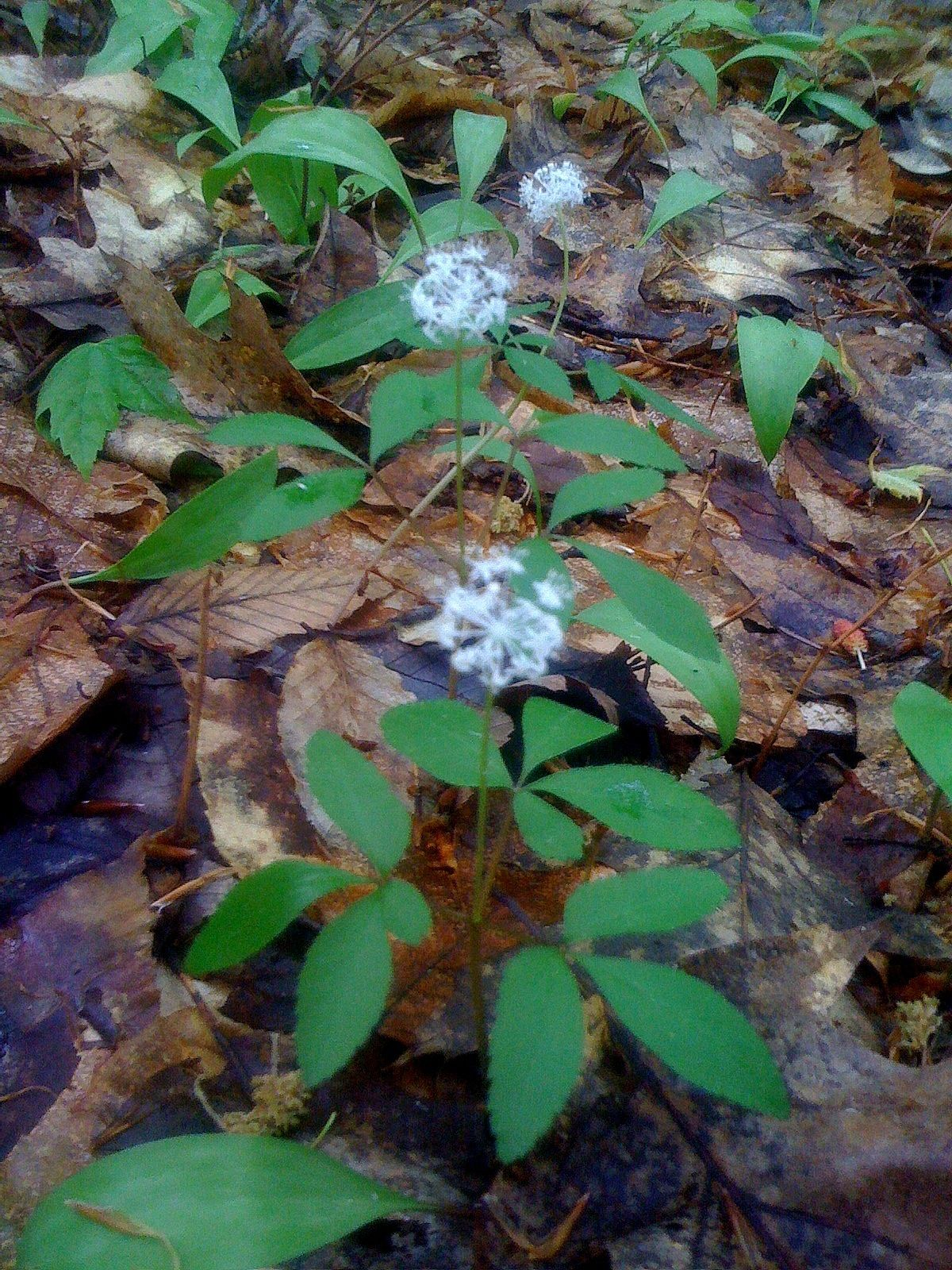

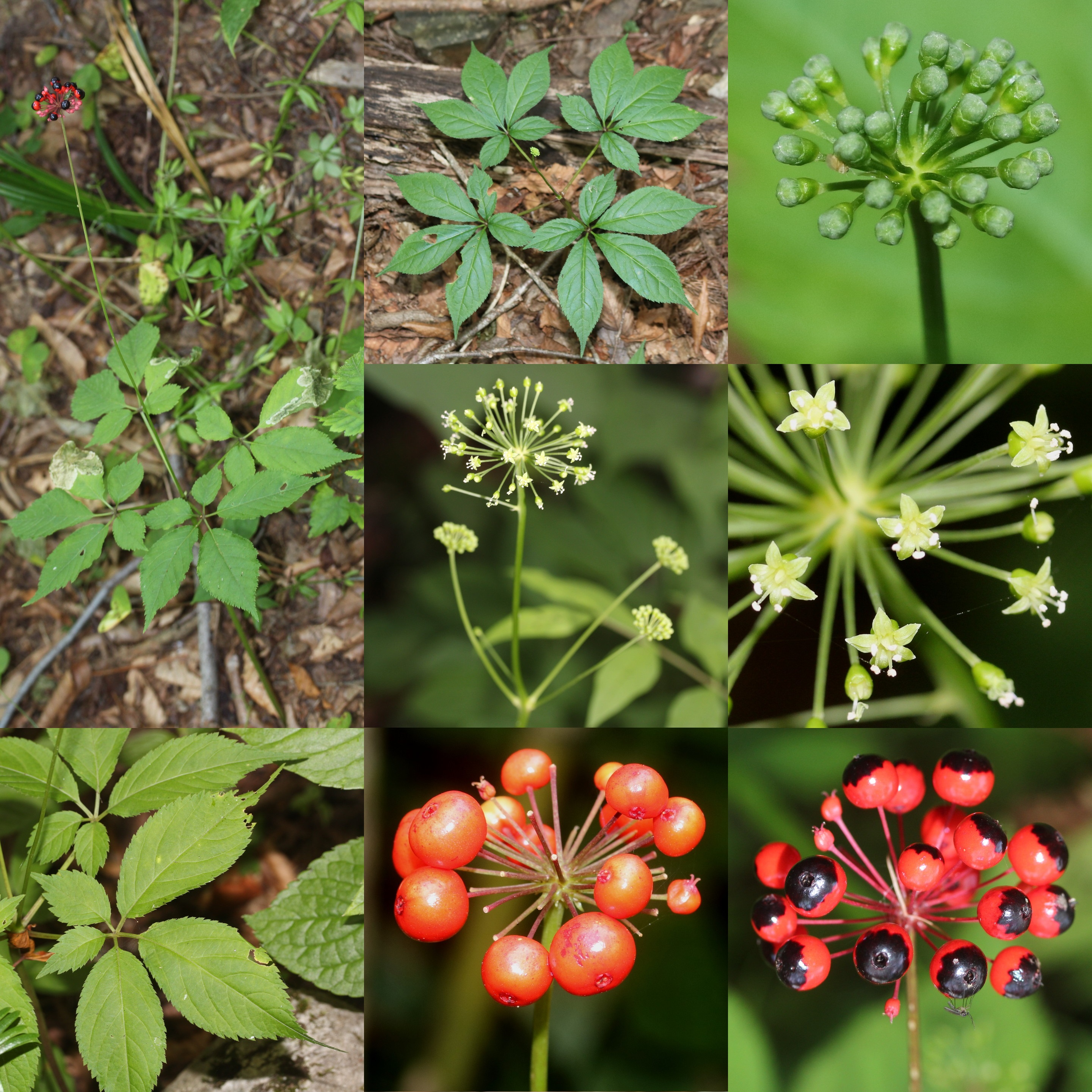

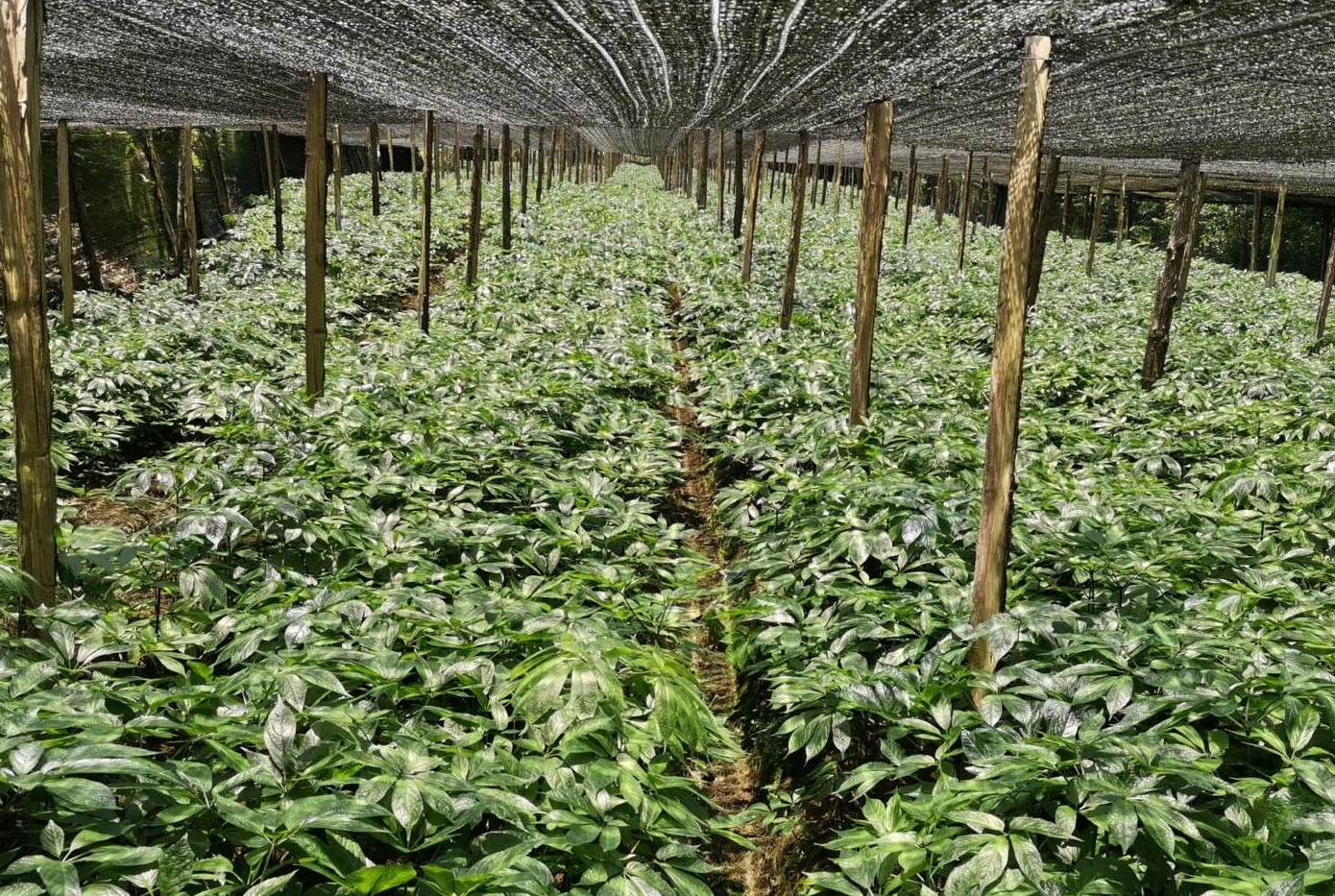

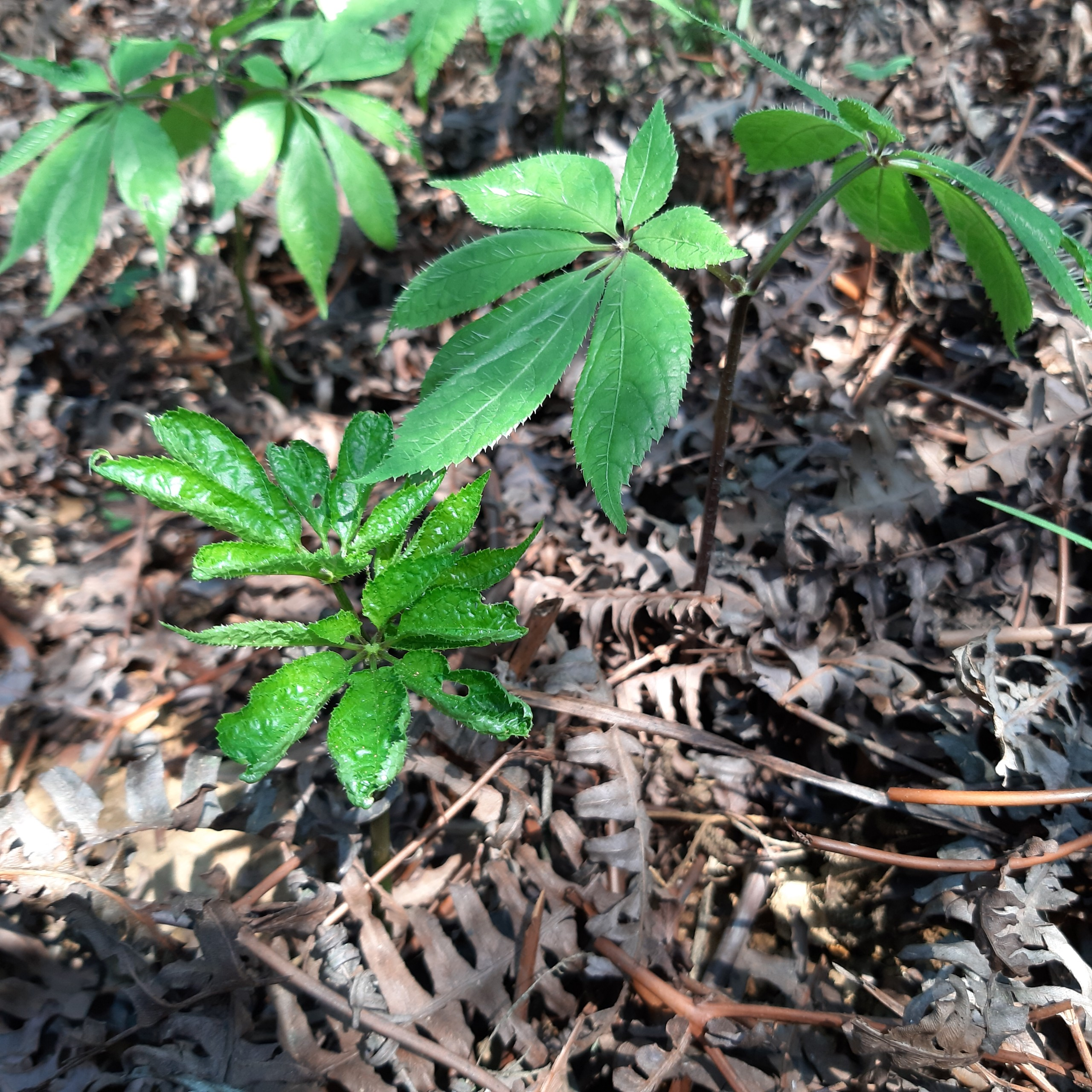
