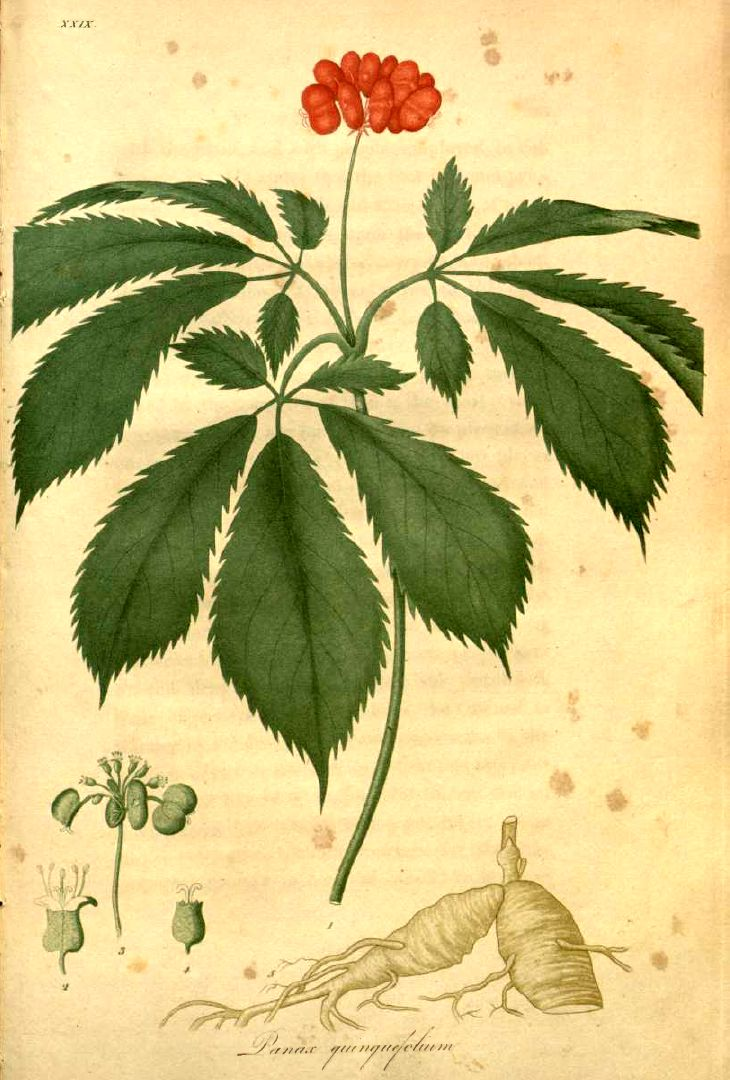
- Panax quinquefolius

Conservation status
- Vulnerable (NatureServe)
- CITES Appendix II

Scientific classification
- Kingdom: Plantae
- Clade: Tracheophytes
- Clade: Angiosperms
- Clade: Eudicots
- Clade: Asterids
- Order: Apiales
- Family: Araliaceae
- Genus: Panax
- Subgenus: Panax subg. Panax
- Species: P. quinquefolius

Binomial name
- Panax quinquefolius L.

Synonyms
- Homotypic synonyms: Aralia quinquefolia (L.) Decne. & Planch.; Ginseng quinquefolium (L.) Alph.Wood; Heterotypic synonyms: Panax americanus (Raf.) Raf.; Panax americanus var. elatus Raf.; Panax americanus var. obovatus (Raf.) Raf.; Panax cuneatus Raf.; Panax quinquefolius var. americanus Raf.; Panax quinquefolius var. obovatus Raf.

= American ginseng =

Species of flowering plant

American ginseng (Panax quinquefolius) is a species of flowering plant in the ivy family Araliaceae. It is native to eastern North America although its cultivation was successfully introduced to China in 1975. The specific epithet quinquefolius means "five-leaved", which refers to the typical number of leaflets per leaf. It is one of a group of taxa known as "ginseng".

The conservation status of wild American ginseng is globally vulnerable. To control international trade and prevent global extinction of the wild species, the United States Fish and Wildlife Service implements a CITES Export Program that authorizes 19 states and one tribe to export American ginseng from the United States. From 1978 to 2019, the bulk of exports have come from southern Appalachian states, especially Kentucky, West Virginia, and Tennessee.

As wild populations declined in the late 19th century, American ginseng became a domesticated crop. It is cultivated primarily in Ontario, British Columbia, Wisconsin, and China.

== Description ==
Panax quinquefolius is a herbaceous perennial plant. Its aromatic root resembles a small parsnip that forks as it matures. The plant grows 6 to 18 in (15 to 46 cm) tall, usually bearing three compound leaves (sometimes called "prongs"), each with three to five leaflets, 2 to 5 in (5 to 13 cm) long.

Panax quinquefolius is sometimes confused with wild sarsaparilla (Aralia nudicaulis), another member of the ivy family (Araliaceae). The two species may be distinguished by their leaves. Panax quinquefolius has palmately compound leaves (with leaflets radiating from a single point) while Aralia nudicaulis has pinnately compound leaves (with leaflets arranged on either side of a central stalk).

=== Phytochemistry ===
Chemical structure of protopanaxadiol

Like Asian ginseng (Panax ginseng), American ginseng contains dammarane-type ginsenosides, or saponins, as phytochemicals.

== Taxonomy ==
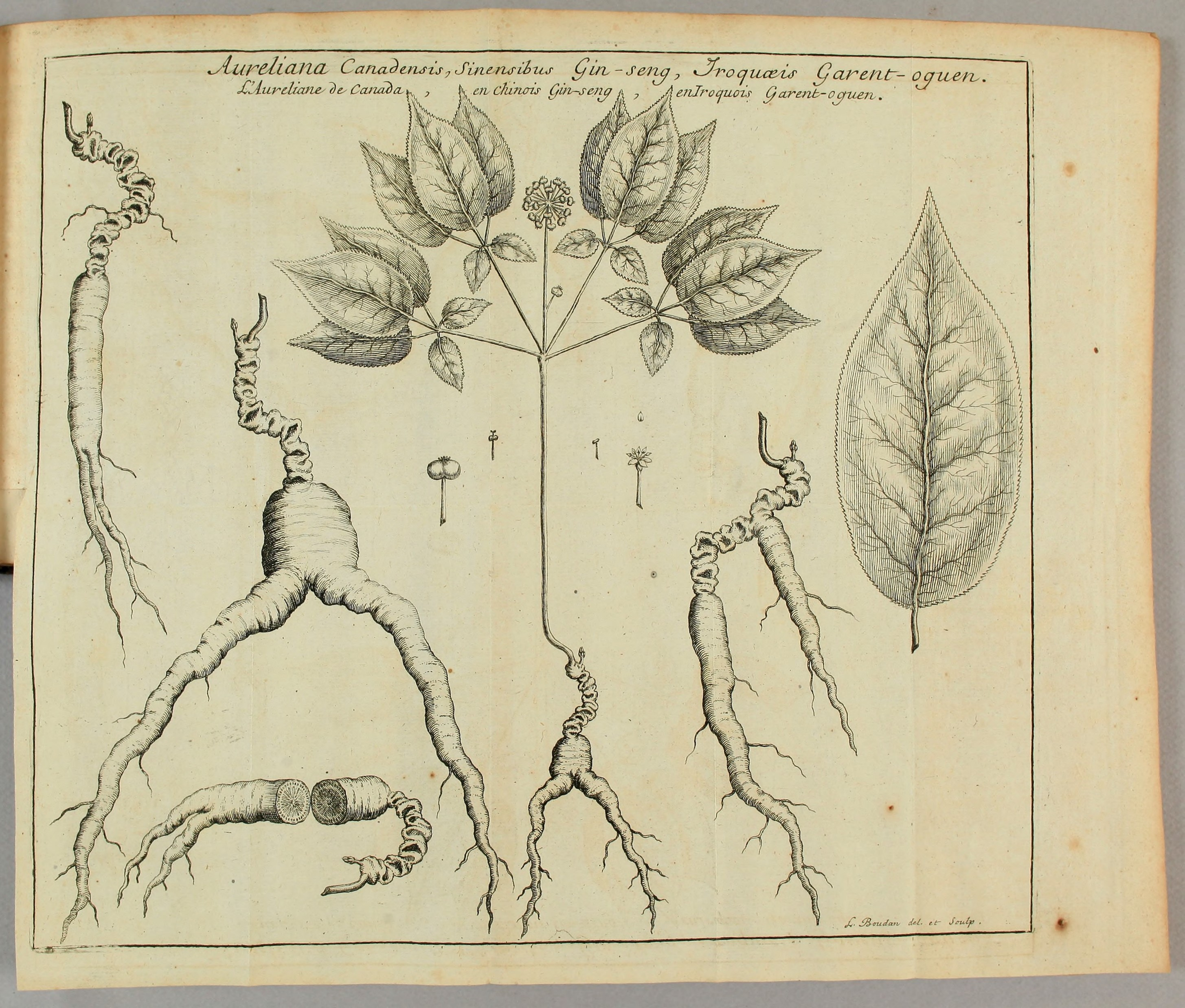
Aureliana canadensis, a synonym for Panax quinquefolius, illustrated by Joseph-François Lafitau in 1718

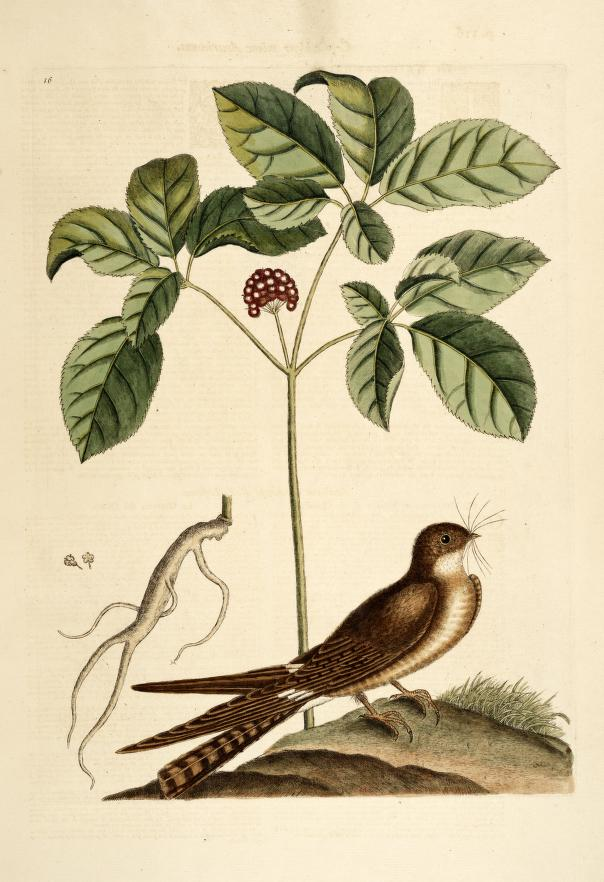
Whip-poor-will and Ginseng, illustrated by Mark Catesby in 1747

Panax quinquefolius was described as Aureliana canadensis by the French ethnologist and naturalist Joseph-François Lafitau in 1718. As a Jesuit missionary in New France, Lafitau discovered ginseng near Montreal in 1716. In his search for a specimen, Father Lafitau enlisted the help of the Haudenosaunee by showing them a published botanical illustration of gin-seng, a Chinese name for a plant now known as Panax ginseng. The Haudenosaunee referred to American ginseng as garent-oguen (Mohawk: tekaren’tó:ken), which means "resembles man" or "a man's thigh" in Iroquoian language.

Aureliana canadensis was further described by the English naturalist Mark Catesby in 1747. Catesby published a color illustration of a live specimen transplanted from Pennsylvania to the garden of English botanist Peter Collinson in Peckham. Aureliana canadensis Lafitau ex Catesby is an invalid name since it was published prior to 1 May 1753 (Art.13.1 ICN 2018).

The Swedish botanist Carl Linnaeus validly described Panax quinquefolium in 1753, but the name was later corrected to Panax quinquefolius. Linnaeus placed Aureliana canadensis Lafitau ex Catesby in synonymy with Panax quinquefolius, citing both Lafitau [1718] and Catesby [1747]. Its type specimen, designated in 1991, was reportedly collected by Pehr Kalm near Quebec in 1749. The specific epithet quinquefolius means "five-leaved", which refers to the typical number of leaflets per leaf.

=== Etymology ===
The name ginseng ultimately derives from the Chinese herbalism term, rénshēn. Other Chinese names are huaqishen (simplified Chinese: 花旗参; traditional Chinese: 花旗參; pinyin: huāqíshēn; Cantonese Yale: fākèihsām; lit. 'Flower Flag ginseng') or xiyangshen (simplified Chinese: 西洋参; traditional Chinese: 西洋參; pinyin: xīyángshēn; Cantonese Yale: sāiyèuhngsām; lit. 'west ocean ginseng').

The genus name "Panax" is derived from the Greek 'Panakos' (panacea), in reference to the supposed benefits attributed to the herb. The specific epithet "quinquefolius" means five-leaved.

== Distribution and habitat ==
Panax quinquefolius is native to the eastern United States and southeastern Canada. It is found primarily in the Appalachian and Ozark mountains of the United States where it prefers full shade environments in deciduous hardwood forests. It is introduced and cultivated in the Chinese provinces of Guizhou, Heilongjiang, Jiangsu, Jiangxi, Jilin, and Liaoning.

== Ecology ==
Panax quinquefolius is a summer flowering plant. In New England, flower buds and leaves emerge simultaneously around the middle of June, with flowers eventually appearing in July. Fruits mature to a deep red color by early September. The seeds exhibit a type of dormancy called morphophysiological dormancy, sometimes called "double dormancy", which requires two full winters to completely break dormancy. Germination finally takes place eighteen months after the fruit initially ripened.

== Exploitation and conservation ==
Ginseng was introduced to European medicine by the French Jesuit, Joseph-François Lafitau, who was searching for the plant in Kahnawá:ke in 1716. Lafitau had encountered Chinese ginseng and believed that the French colonies in Canada would have suitable conditions that the plant would also be found there. Leveraging the expertise of the indigenous Mohawk peoples he encountered Aureliana canasensis which he believed to be the same species as found in China. Lafitau justified claim by linking the Mohawk word garent-oguen and gin-seng. According to his theological and anthropological theories, he believed there was a common origin between the indigenous peoples of America and China which he justified with this link.

By 1720, ginseng from Quebec was exported to China by the Company of the Indies, a French trading company. Within a few decades, ginseng populations near Montreal were suffering from overharvesting and habitat destruction, and so the wild-harvesting of ginseng began to spread south. By the end of the 18th century, Albany, New York, had become a trading center for ginseng.

During the twentieth century, exports of wild ginseng from the U.S. were about half of what they were during the previous century, averaging about 580,000 kilograms per decade. Between 2000 and 2020, U.S. exports of wild ginseng dropped to approximately 250,000 kilograms per decade.

=== Export control ===
To control international trade, Panax quinquefolius is listed in Appendix II of the Convention on International Trade in Endangered Species (CITES). CITES Appendix II includes species that, although currently not threatened with global extinction, may become so without trade controls. As of September 2022, nineteen (19) states and one tribe are authorized to export American ginseng from the United States.

From 1978 to 2019, 1,713,025 kilograms of wild and wild-simulated ginseng roots were legally exported from the United States. American ginseng also grows wild in a number of states that do not permit export, including Connecticut (S2), Delaware (S2), Kansas (S1), Maine (S3), Massachusetts (S3), Michigan (S2S3), Nebraska (S1), New Hampshire (S2), New Jersey (S2), Oklahoma (S1), Rhode Island (S1), and South Carolina (S4).

=== Status ===
As determined by the Committee on the Status of Endangered Wildlife in Canada, the conservation status of Panax quinquefolius is Endangered (E) in Canada. In Ontario and Quebec, it is listed as Endangered and Threatened, respectively. Both provincial designations refer to a species facing imminent extinction or extirpation. Consequently, the harvesting, possession, and export of wild American Ginseng in Canada is prohibited.

As of February 2024, the NatureServe conservation status of Panax quinquefolius is globally vulnerable (G3G4). It is vulnerable (S3) in 14 states; imperiled (S2) in 8 states and provinces; critically imperiled (S1) in 6 states; and possibly extirpated (SH) in the District of Columbia.

In addition to (or in lieu of) the NatureServe conservation status (in parentheses below), some states designate their own conservation status:

- Connecticut (S2): Special Concern
- Delaware (S2)
- Georgia (S3)
- Illinois (S3?)
- Indiana (S3)
- Iowa (S3)
- Kansas (S1)
- Kentucky (S3)
- Louisiana (S1)
- Maine (S3): Endangered
- Maryland (S2S3)
- Massachusetts (S3): Special Concern
- Michigan (S2S3): Threatened
- Minnesota (S3): Special Concern
- Mississippi (S3)
- Nebraska (S1): Threatened
- New Hampshire (S2): Threatened
- New Jersey (S2): S1
- New York (S4): Exploitably Vulnerable
- North Carolina (S3S4): Rare but Relatively Secure; Exploited
- Oklahoma (S1)
- Pennsylvania (S4): Pennsylvania Vulnerable
- Rhode Island (S1): State Endangered
- South Dakota (S1)
- Tennessee (S3S4): Special Concern; Commercially Exploited
- Vermont (S3): High Priority Species of Greatest Conservation Need
- Virginia (S3S4): Threatened
- West Virginia (S3S4)

Panax quinquefolius is apparently secure (S4) in New York and Pennsylvania (as shown above), as well as Alabama, Arkansas, Missouri, Ohio, South Carolina, and Wisconsin.

=== Threats ===
American ginseng was formerly particularly widespread in the Appalachian and Ozark regions (and adjacent forested regions such as Pennsylvania, New York and Ontario). Due to its popularity and unique habitat requirements, the wild plant has been overharvested, as well as lost through destruction of its habitat, and is thus rare in most parts of the United States and Canada. Ginseng is also negatively affected by deer browsing, urbanization, and habitat fragmentation. Today the greatest threat to American ginseng is irresponsible digging of its wild roots for export.

== Cultivation ==
As wild populations of American ginseng began to decline in the late 19th century, a market developed for cultivated ginseng. In 1887, the tinsmith George Stanton planted ginseng in the forest around Apulia Station, a hamlet in the town of Fabius in Onondaga County, New York. In his obituary (1908), Stanton was called the Father of the Cultivated Ginseng Industry.

Farther north, the cultivation of Panax quinquefolius pioneered by Clarence and Albert Hellyer in Norfolk County, Ontario, beginning in the 1890s.

American ginseng is grown commercially under artificial shade. Under these conditions, a crop is harvested three to five years after seeding. Ginseng is also grown under forest-based, wild-simulated conditions, which require 6–10 years (or more) before harvest. Based solely on yield, forest farming may be 1/10 as productive as commercial cultivation.

In 2024, American ginseng exports – an indicator of cultivation and production – showed that Canada led with 2,974,971 kg (6,558,688 lb), China had 2,165,977 kg (4,775,162 lb), United States with 428,357 kg (944,366 lb), and South Korea with 333,355 kg (734,922 lb) as the four largest producers.

Some states encourage the planting of ginseng both to restore natural habitats and to remove pressure from remaining wild populations. American ginseng is woods-cultivated in Colorado, Kentucky, Maine, North Carolina, Tennessee, Vermont, Virginia, and West Virginia.

== Toxicity ==
Individuals requiring anticoagulant therapy, such as warfarin, should avoid use of ginseng. It is not recommended for individuals with impaired liver or renal function, or during pregnancy or breastfeeding. Other adverse effects include headaches, anxiety, trouble sleeping and an upset stomach.

Through the cultivated procedures for American ginseng, fungal molds, pesticides, and various metals and residues have contaminated the crop, leading to health concerns.

== Folk medicine ==
American ginseng was of minor importance in Native American folk medicine. The Haudenosaunee ingested or smoked the roots as a panacea. The Menominee in northern Wisconsin used it as a tonic and to increase one's mental capability, while the Penobscot in Maine used it to promote fertility. The Seminole in Florida used it for gunshot wounds. In the late 19th century, the Cherokee sold large quantities of ginseng to traders for fifty cents a pound. According to James Mooney, a decoction made from its roots was drunk to relieve headaches and cramps.

There is no good evidence that American ginseng is effective for preventing or treating influenza or the common cold.

== History ==
Historically, the plant was used by Indigenous peoples of North America, including the Haudenosaunee. It is known as Tekaren’tó:ken in Mohawk, degaęʼdó·gęʼ in Onondaga, and jóë́ʼdö:ge:ʼ in Seneca.

The global trade of Panax quinquefolius with Asia dates back over 300 years, beginning with French Jesuits in Quebec, who, with the assistance of the Haudenosaunee, facilitated its exchange. Alongside fur, it represents the oldest trade between East Asia and North America. A key figure in this trade was the ethnologist Joseph-François Lafitau, who played a pivotal role in establishing the global market for Panax quinquefolius in the early 18th century.

== Culture ==
In the local vernacular, American ginseng has been variously known as "cheng", "chang", "sang", or "shang". Those collecting it have been called "shangers" and hunting for it has been called "shanging". In the southeastern United States, wild-harvesting of American ginseng may be called "sang hunting".

== Gallery ==
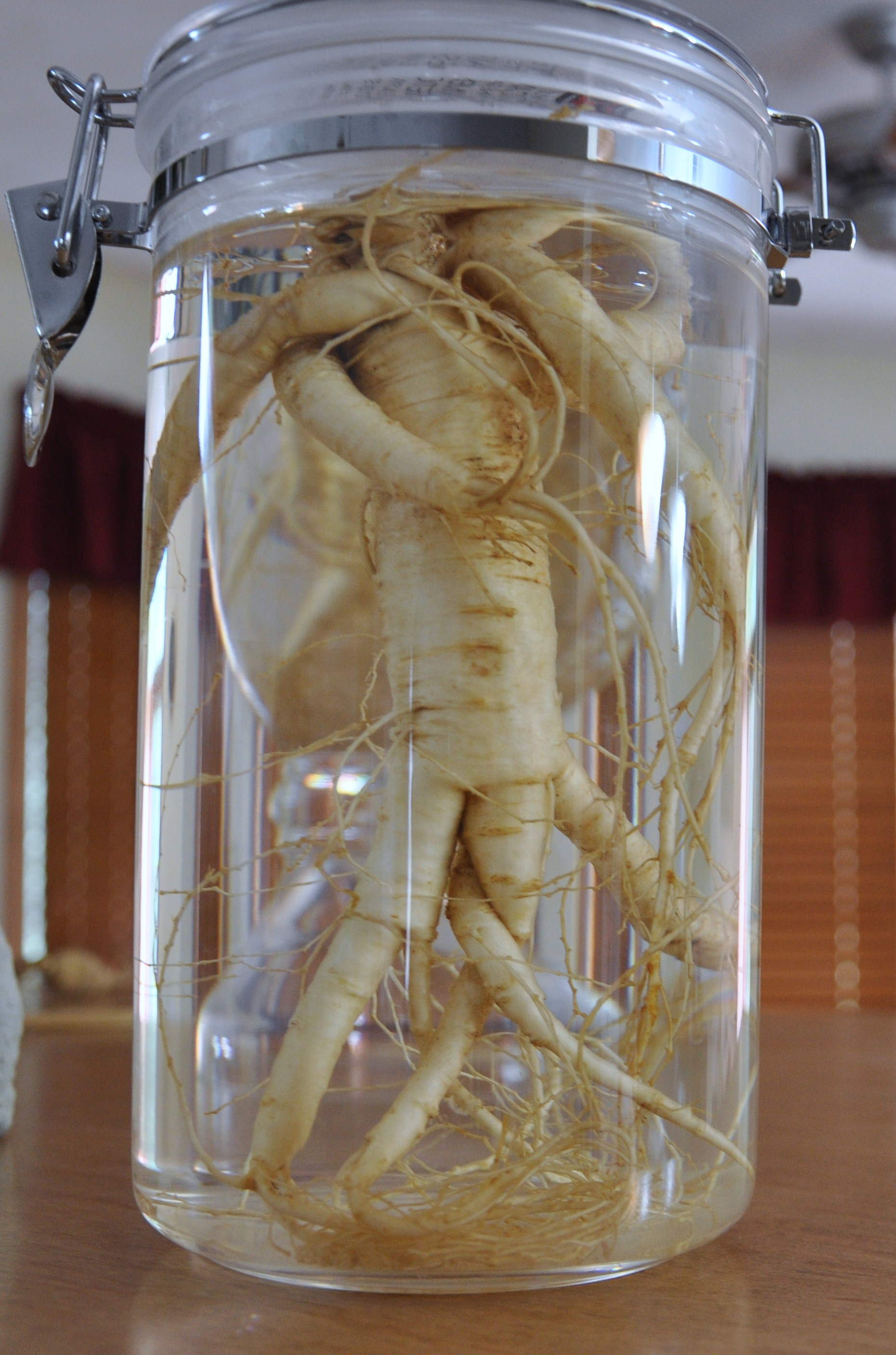
American ginseng in human figure

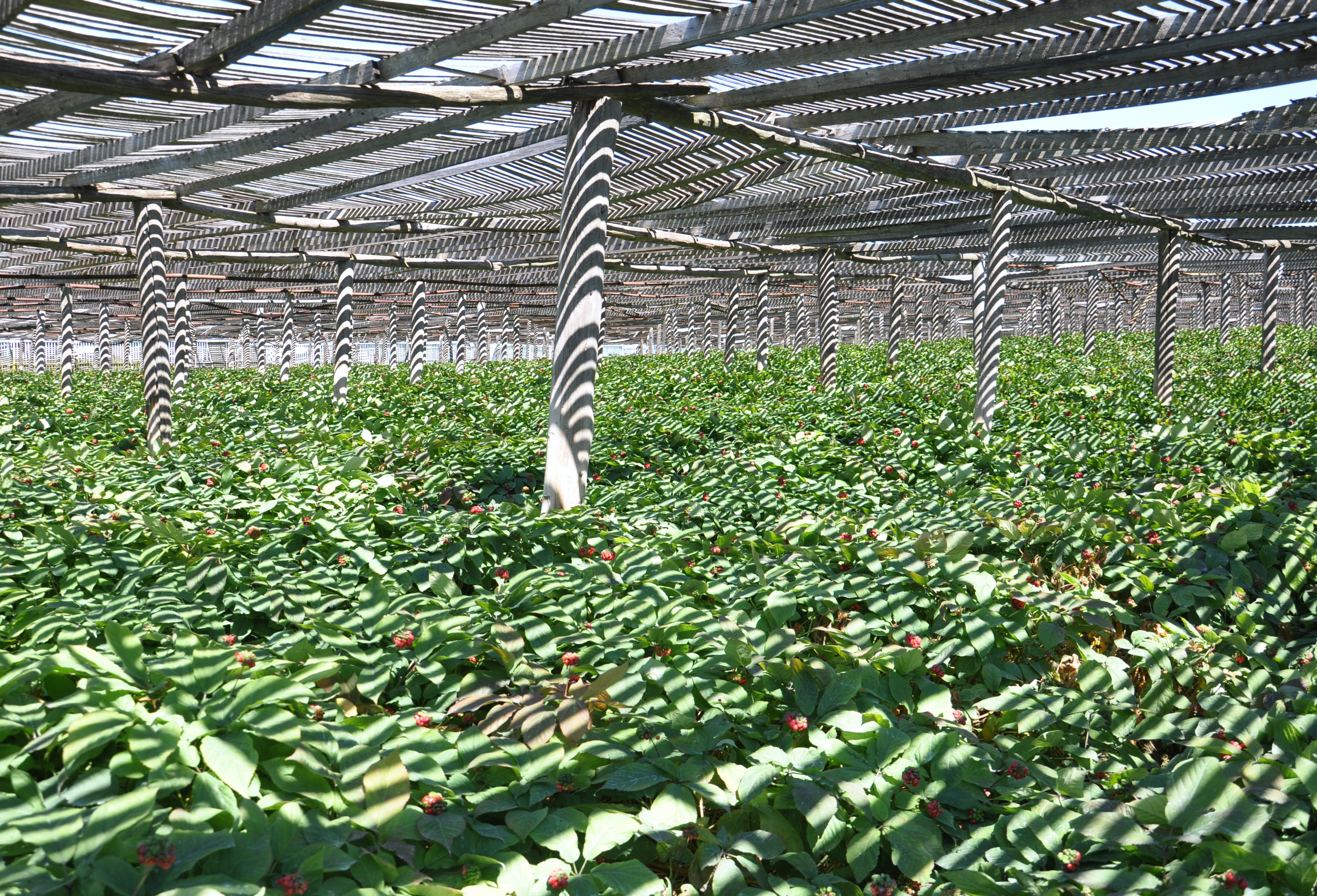
Under wooden shade, American ginseng in late fall at Monk Garden in Wisconsin

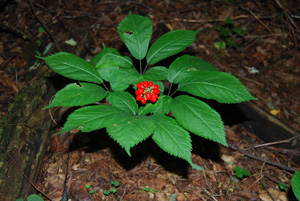
American ginseng plant with fruit

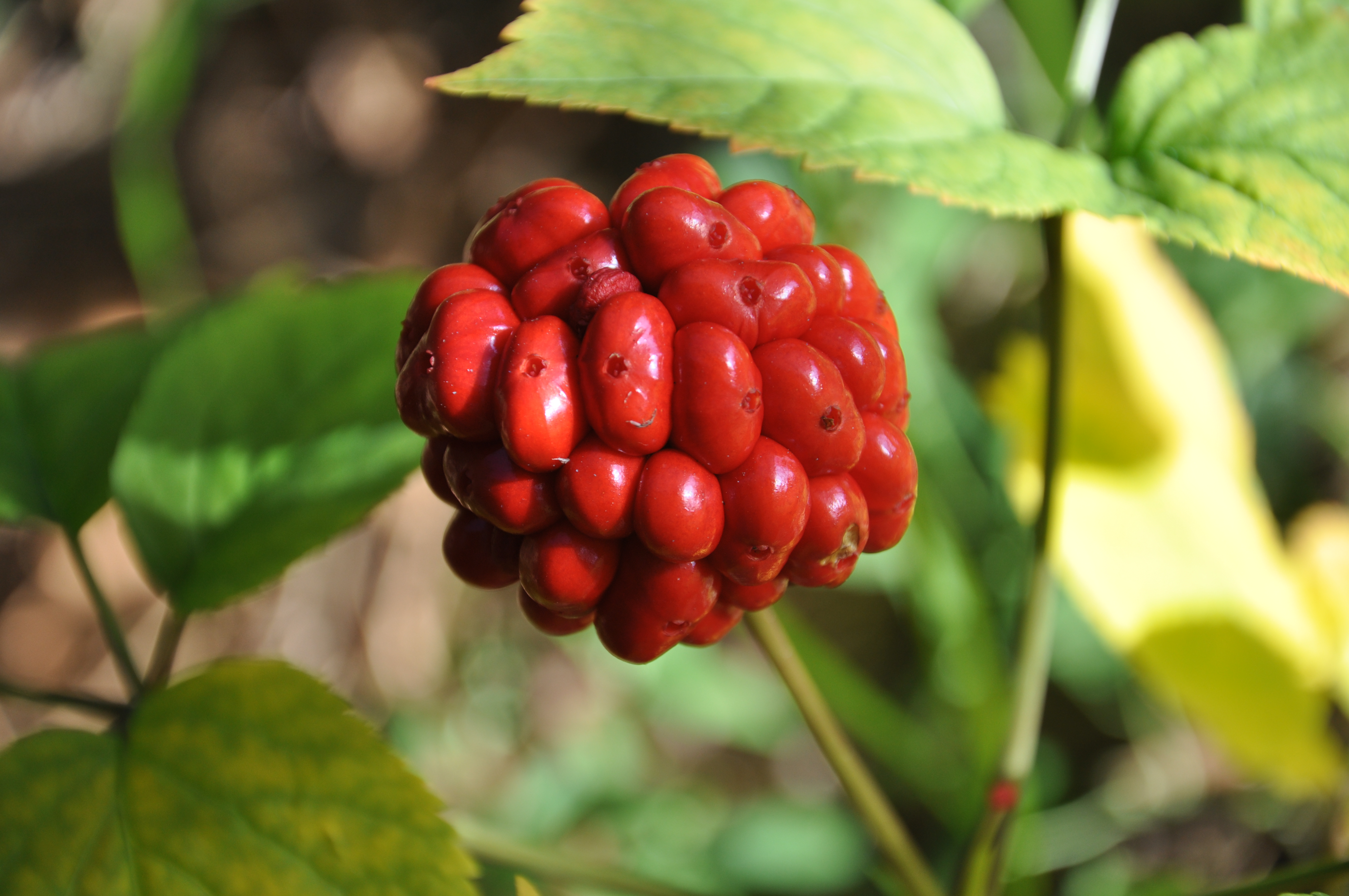
American ginseng berries are ripe by late fall in Wisconsin.

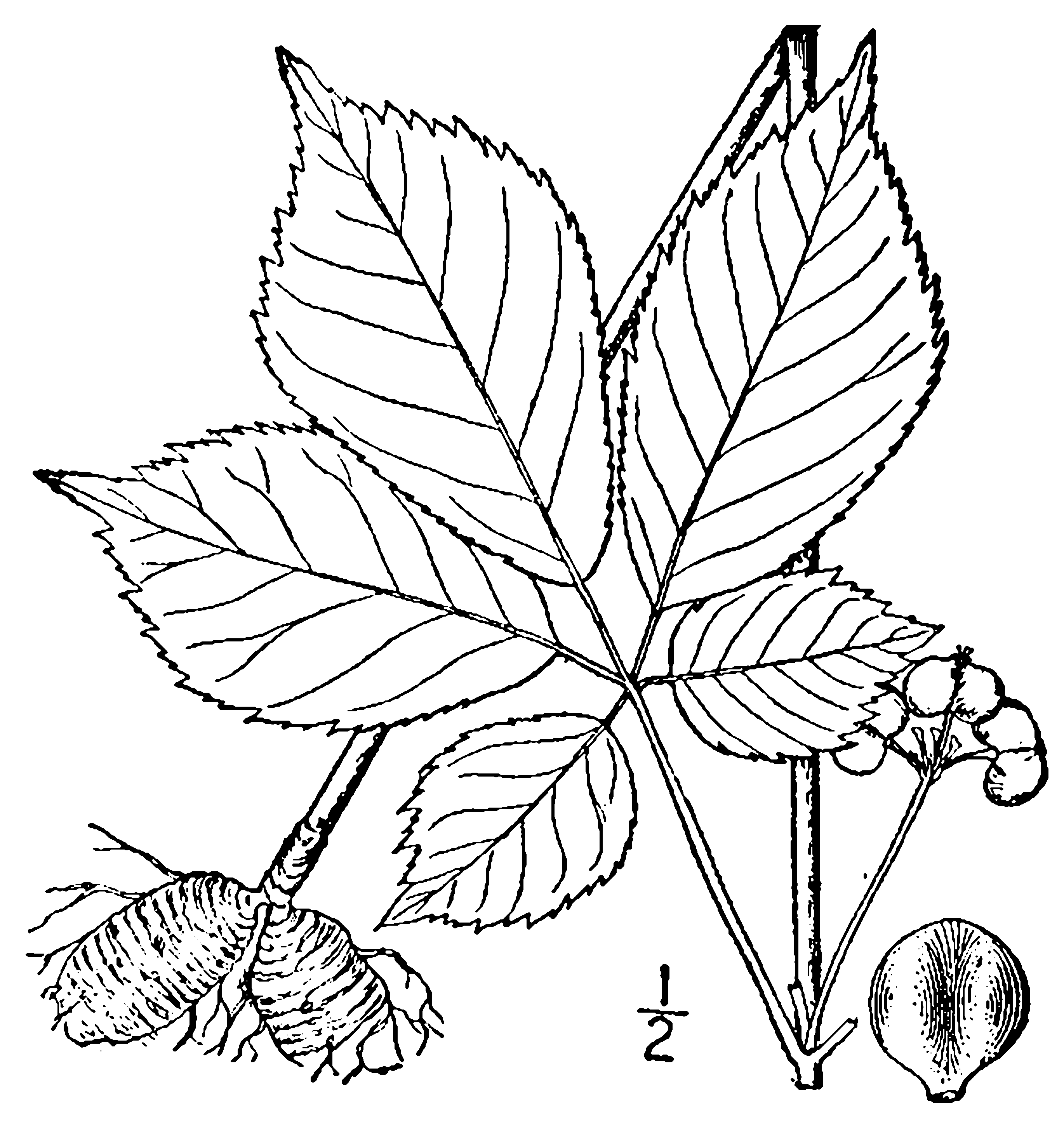
A drawn image of the fruit and leaf of the American ginseng plant

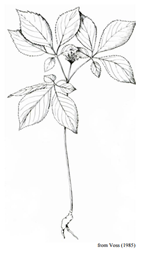
A drawn image of the American ginseng plants leaves

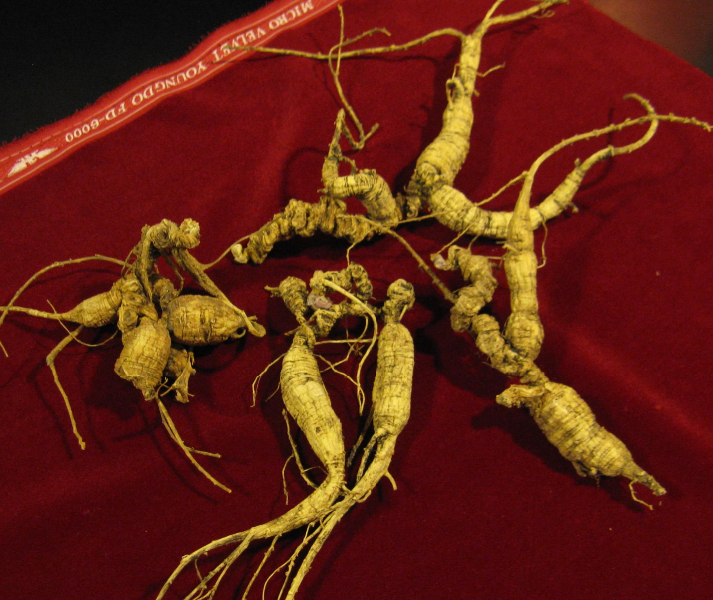
American wild ginseng root (Panax quinquefolius). Old roots, ranging from 40 to 60 growth scars.

== See also ==
- Panax trifolius, the dwarf ginseng
- Eleutherococcus senticosus, the Siberian ginseng
