= Gintonin =

Protein found in ginseng

Major latex-like protein
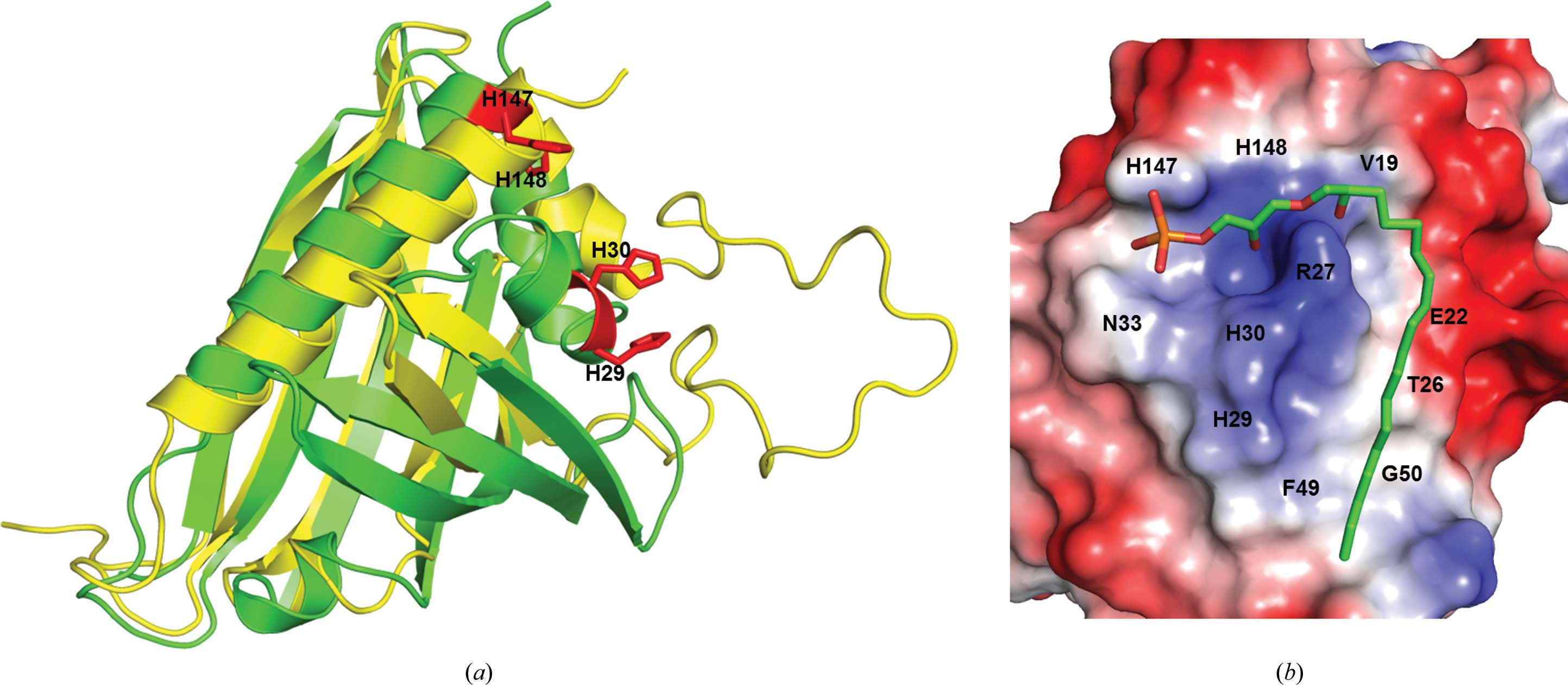
- Gintonin bound to lysophosphatidic acid C18:2. (a) Superposition of ginseng major latex-like protein 151 (GLP;green) and the lowest energy major latex protein 28 conformer (yellow). The mutated residues in GLP are represented by red sticks. (b) The electrostatic molecular surface of GLP modelled with LPA C18:2 in close conformation. The positions of the residues that recognize LPA C18:2 are labelled.

Identifiers
- Organism: Panax ginseng
- Symbol: mlp151
- UniProt: B5THI3
Search for
- Structures: Swiss-model
- Domains: InterPro

Gintonin is a glycolipoprotein fraction isolated from Panax ginseng. The non-saponin ingredient was designated as gintonin, where gin was derived from ginseng, ton from the tonic effects of ginseng, and in from protein. The main component of gintonin is a complex of lysophosphatidic acids (LPA) and ginseng proteins such as ginseng major latex-like protein151 (GLP151) and ginseng ribonuclease-like storage protein.

GLP151 is a first plant-derived LPA binding protein as one of Bet v 1 superfamily. GLP151 has a LPA binding domain on H147 and H148 at C-terminal. These two histidine residues bind to phosphate group of LPA.

== Biological action ==
Gintonin is believed to act by delivering LPA to lysophospholipid receptors, which are high affinity and selective target receptors. In animal cell cultures, gintonin induces [Ca^{2+}] transients via activation of the said receptor.

One Korean study claims that gintonin is orally active in rodents and shows anti-Alzheimer's disease effects through LPA receptor-mediated non-amyloidogenic pathways. Oral gintonin is well-tolerated by human AD patients in a small study, but the benefits are unclear.

A number of other effects are attributed to oral administration of gintonin-enriched extract in rodents.

== See also ==
- Ginseng
- Ginsenoside
- Lysophosphatidic acid
- Lysophospholipid receptor
