= Insam-ju =

Korean ginseng wine

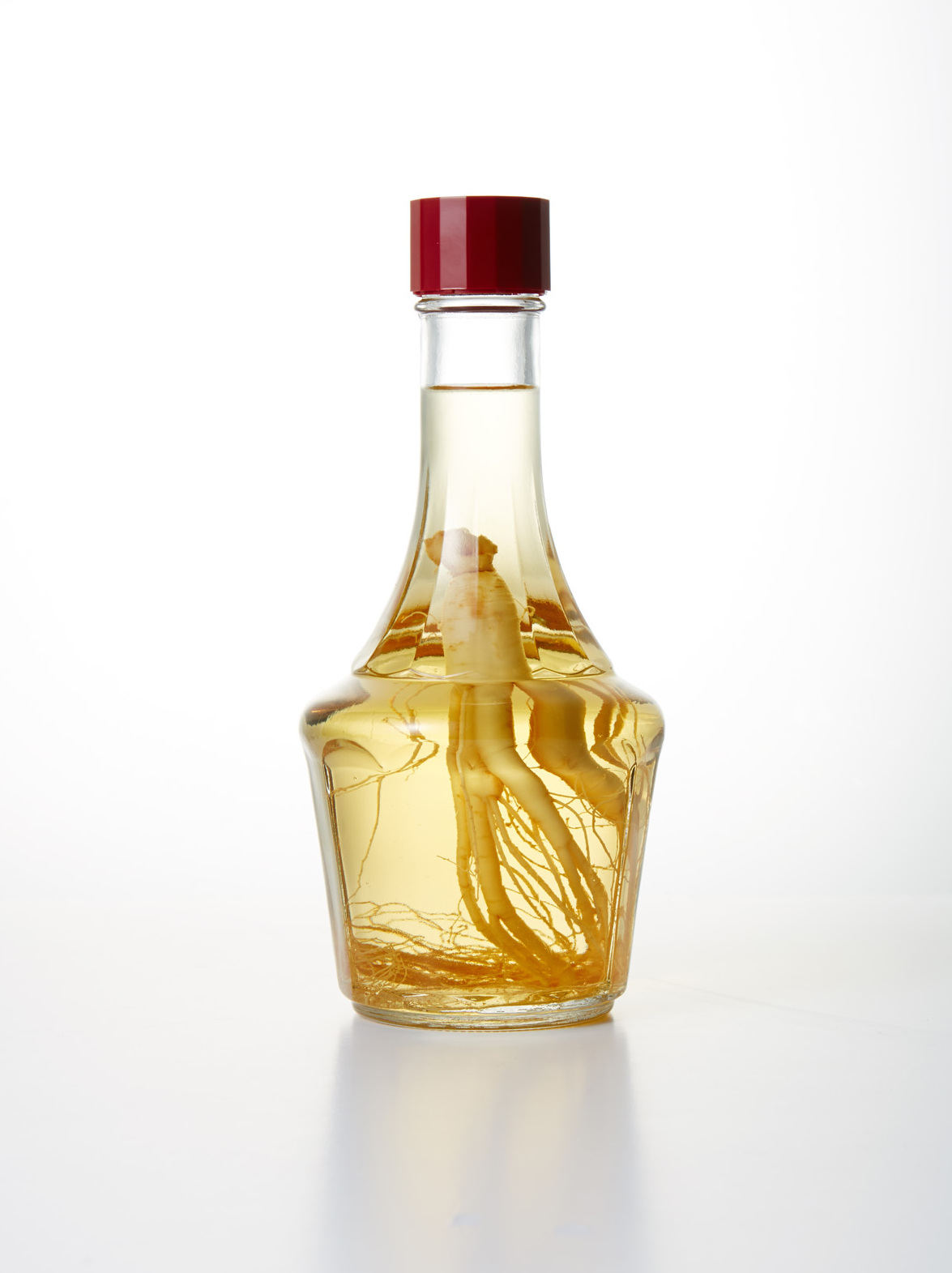
- Type: Infused liquor
- Origin: Korea
- Flavour: Ginseng
- Ingredients: Korean ginseng

Korean name
- Hangul: 인삼주
- Hanja: 人蔘酒
- RR: insamju
- MR: insamju
- IPA: [in.sam.dʑu]

Insam-ju (Korean: 인삼주), also called ginseng liquor or ginseng wine, is an alcoholic beverage made of ginseng. As ginseng itself, the liquor is one of the specialities of both North and South Korea.

The liquor can be served either cold or hot.
