= Panax zingiberensis =

Conservation status
- Endangered (IUCN 3.1)

Scientific classification
- Kingdom: Plantae
- Clade: Tracheophytes
- Clade: Angiosperms
- Clade: Eudicots
- Clade: Asterids
- Order: Apiales
- Family: Araliaceae
- Genus: Panax
- Species: P. zingiberensis

Binomial name
- Panax zingiberensis C.Y.Wu & K.M.Feng

Species of plant

Panax zingiberensis is a species of flowering plant in the family Araliaceae. It is native to China and Vietnam.
