= Ginseng =

Root of a plant used in herbal preparations

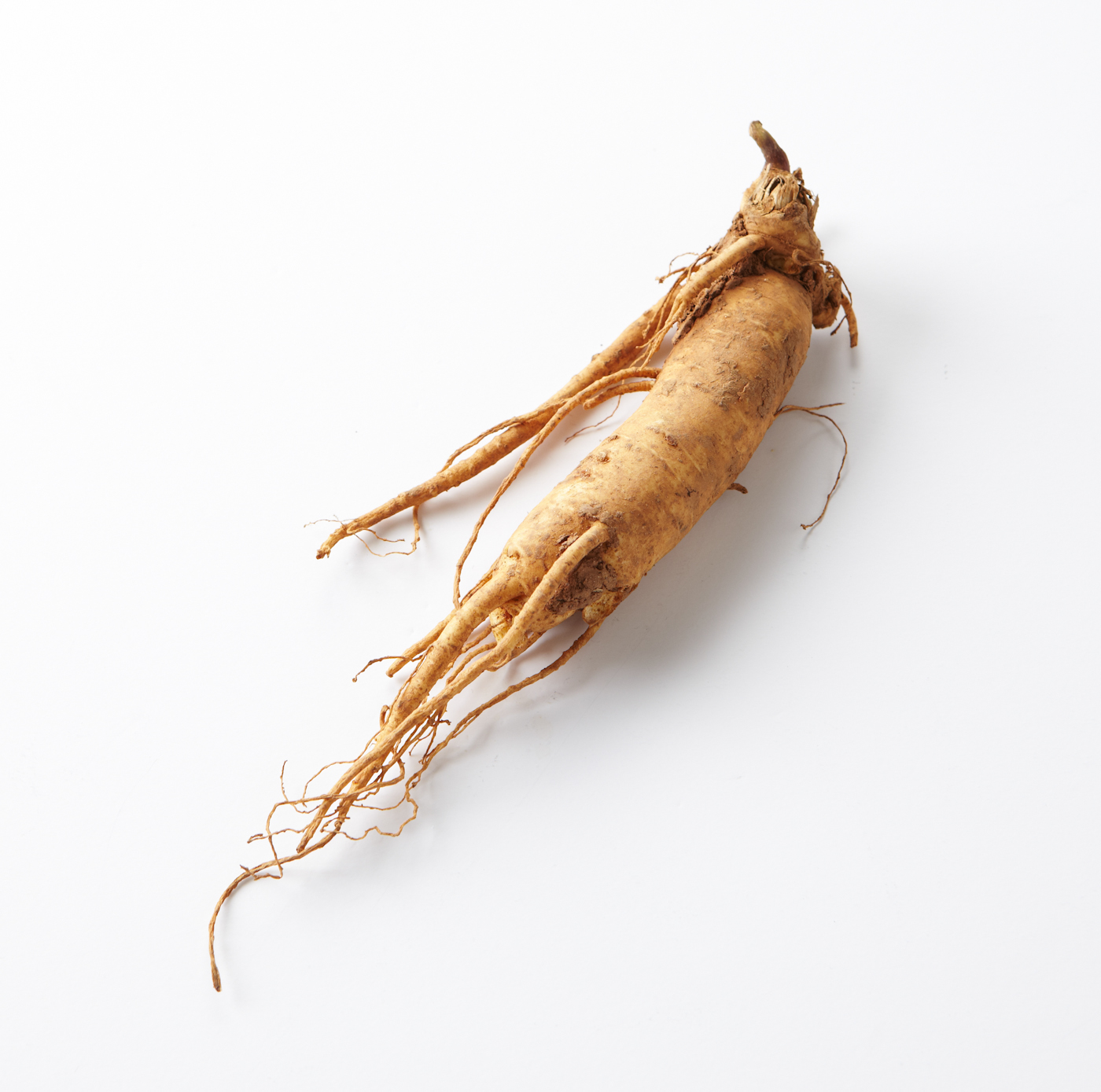
A root of cultivated Korean ginseng (Panax ginseng)

Ginseng (/ˈdʒɪnsɛŋ/) is the root (Note: Traditionally the rhizome is harvested with the root, but discarded during processing. This practice is not called for in the oldest Shennong Ben Cao Jing text, but Huashi Zhong Cangjing (allegedly Han Dynasty, actually Song Dynasty) claims that the rhizome causes vomiting and destroys qi, hence it should be removed. Modern Chinese clinical trials have not found such an effect, and the "vomiting" aspect is now believed to be a misrepresentation of an alleged expectorant activity of the rhizome. The rhizome also contains higher phytochemical conentrations. The Pharmacopoeia of the People's Republic of China includes the rhizome as "ginseng" since its 2005 edition.) of plants in the genus Panax, such as South China ginseng (P. notoginseng), Korean ginseng (P. ginseng), and American ginseng (P. quinquefolius), characterized by the presence of ginsenosides and gintonin.

Ginseng has been used in the traditional medicine of Korea and China for centuries, although there is no clinical evidence that it has any therapeutic effects. There is no substantial evidence that ginseng is effective for treating any medical condition and it has not been approved by the US Food and Drug Administration (FDA) to treat or prevent a disease or to provide a health benefit. Although ginseng is sold as a dietary supplement, inconsistent manufacturing practices for supplements have led to analyses of some ginseng products contaminated with unrelated filler compounds, and its excessive use may have adverse effects or untoward interactions with prescription drugs.

== Etymology ==
The English word "ginseng" comes from the Teochew Chinese jîn-sim (人蔘; where this transliteration is in Pe̍h-ōe-jī). The first character 人 (pinyin rén; Modern Standard Mandarin pronunciation: [ʐə̌n] or [ɻə̌n]) means "person" and the second character 蔘 (pinyin: shēn; MSM: [ʂə́n]) means "plant root" in a forked shape.

== Ginseng species ==
=== Genus ===
Ginseng plants belong only to the genus Panax. Cultivated species include Panax ginseng (Korean ginseng), Panax japonicus (Japanese ginseng), Panax notoginseng (South China ginseng), Panax quinquefolius (American ginseng). Ginseng is found in cooler climates – the Korean Peninsula, Northeast China, Russian Far East, Canada and the United States, although some species grow in warm regions – South China ginseng being native to Southwest China and Vietnam. Panax vietnamensis (Vietnamese ginseng) is the southernmost Panax species known.

=== Wild ginseng ===
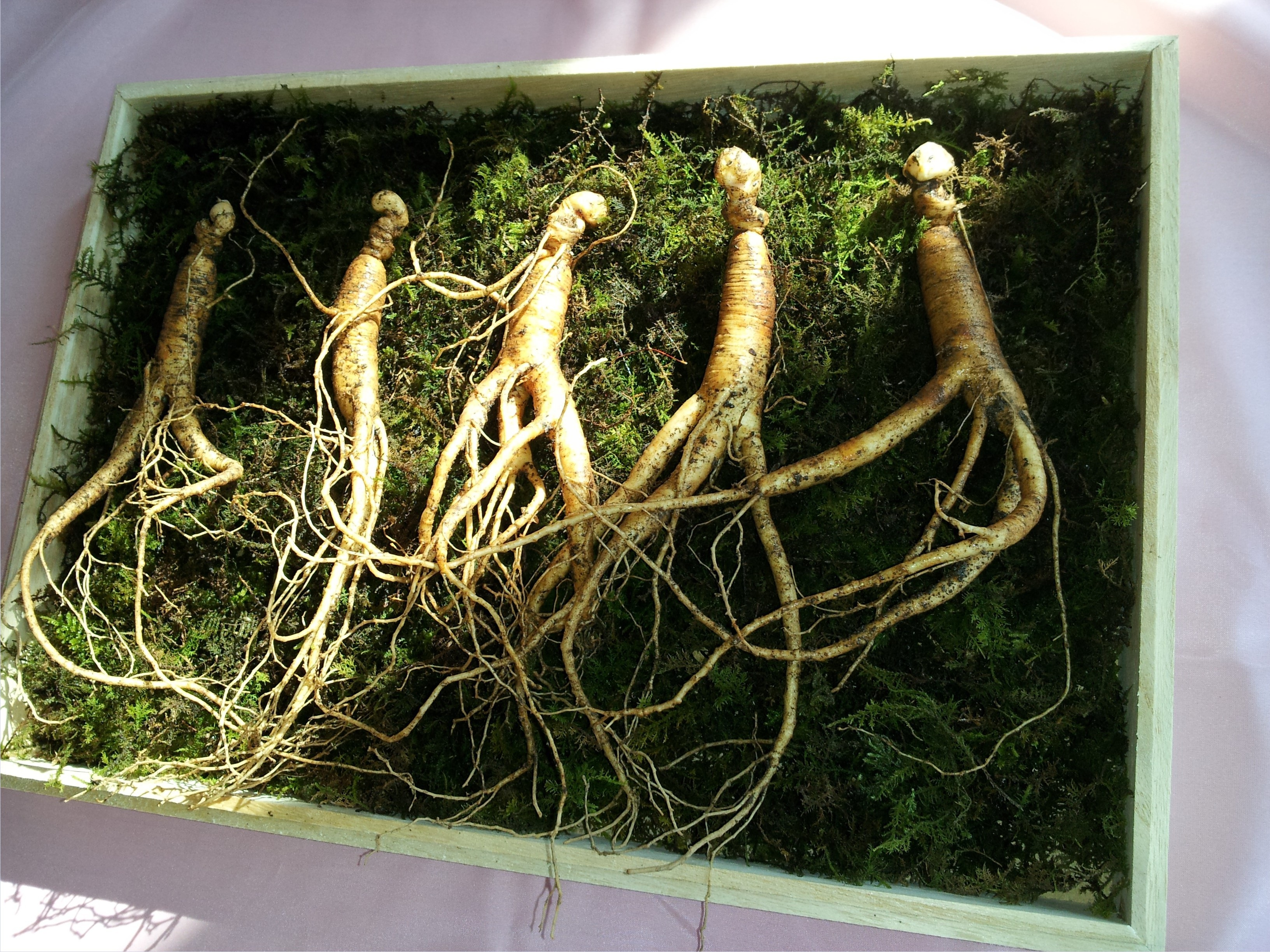
Wild Korean ginseng (P. ginseng)

Wild ginseng (Korean: 산삼; Hanja: 山蔘; RR: sansam; lit. 'mountain ginseng') grows naturally in mountains and is hand-picked by gatherers known as simmani (심마니). The wild ginseng plant is almost extinct in China and endangered globally. This is due to high demand for the product in recent years, leading to the harvesting of wild plants faster than they can grow and reproduce (a wild ginseng plant can take years to reach maturity). Wild ginseng can be processed to be red or white ginseng.

Wild American ginseng has long been used by Native Americans for medicine. Since the mid-1700s, it has been harvested for international trade. Wild American ginseng can be harvested in 19 states and the Appalachian Mountains but has restrictions for exporting.

=== Cultivated ginseng ===
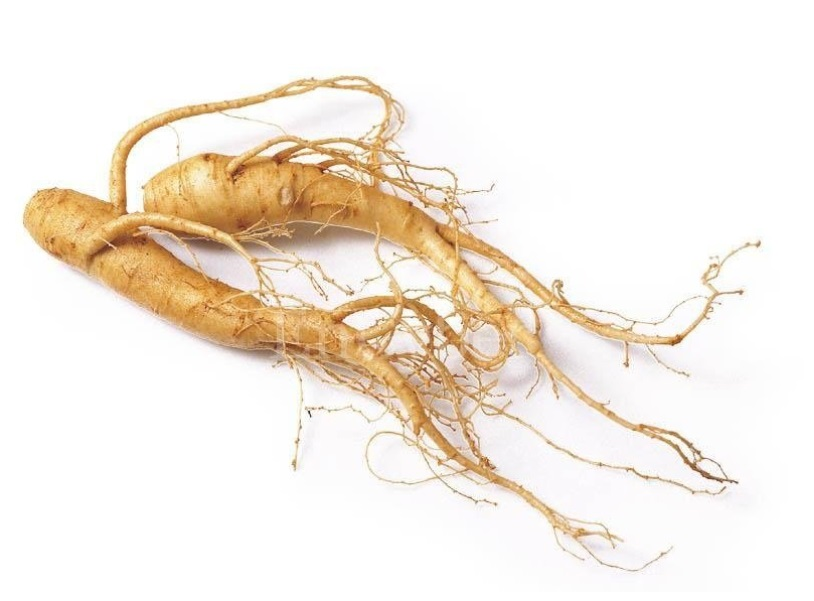
Cultivated Korean ginseng (P. ginseng)

Cultivated ginseng (Korean: 인삼; Hanja: 人蔘; RR: insam; lit. 'human ginseng') is less expensive than the rarely available wild ginseng.

Cultivated ginseng (Korean: 장뇌삼; Hanja: 長腦蔘; RR: jangnoesam) is planted on mountains by humans and is allowed to grow like wild ginseng.

=== Other plants sometimes called ginseng ===
True ginseng plants belong only to the genus Panax. Several other plants are sometimes referred to as ginseng, but they are from a different genus or even family. Siberian ginseng is in the same family, but not genus, as true ginseng. The active compounds in Siberian ginseng are eleutherosides, not ginsenosides. Instead of a fleshy root, Siberian ginseng has a woody root.

- Angelica sinensis (female ginseng, dong quai)
- Codonopsis pilosula (poor man's ginseng, dangshen)
- Eleutherococcus senticosus (Siberian ginseng)
- Ficus microcarpa (Ginseng ficus)
- Gynostemma pentaphyllum (five-leaf ginseng, jiaogulan)
- Kaempferia parviflora (Thai ginseng, krachai dum)
- Lepidium meyenii (Peruvian ginseng, maca)
- Oplopanax horridus (Alaskan ginseng)
- Pfaffia paniculata (Brazilian ginseng, suma)
- Pseudostellaria heterophylla (Prince ginseng)
- Schisandra chinensis (five-flavoured berry)
- Trichopus zeylanicus (Kerala ginseng)
- Withania somnifera (Indian ginseng, ashwagandha)
- Eurycoma longifolia (Malaysian ginseng, tongkat ali)

== Ginseng processing ==
Ginseng seed normally does not germinate until the second spring following the harvest of berries in autumn. They must first be subjected to a long period of storage in a moist medium with a warm/cold treatment, a process known as stratification.

=== Fresh ginseng ===
Fresh ginseng (Korean: 수삼; Hanja: 水蔘; RR: susam; lit. 'water ginseng'), also called "green ginseng", is non-dried raw product.

=== White ginseng ===
White ginseng (Korean: 백삼; Hanja: 白蔘; RR: baeksam; lit. 'white ginseng') is peeled and dried ginseng. White ginseng is fresh ginseng which has been dried without being heated. It is peeled and dried to reduce the water content to 12% or less. Drying in the sun bleaches the root to a yellowish-white color.

=== Red ginseng ===
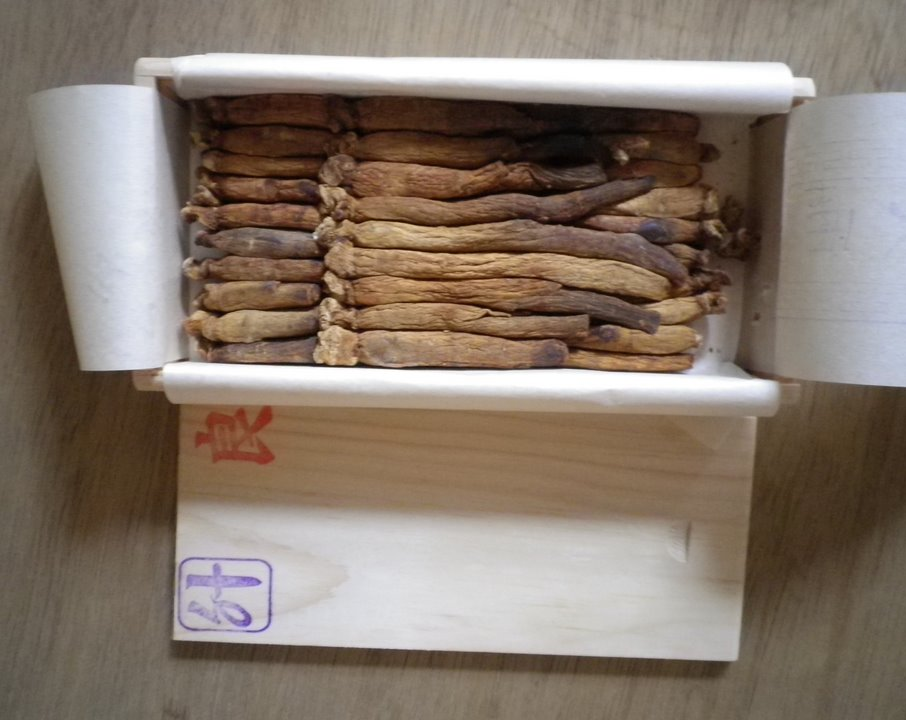
Red ginseng (P. ginseng)

Red ginseng (traditional Chinese: 紅蔘; simplified Chinese: 红参; pinyin: hóngshēn; Korean: 홍삼; romaja: hongsam; lit. 'red ginseng') is steamed and dried ginseng, which has reddish color. Red ginseng is less vulnerable to decay than white ginseng. It is ginseng that has been peeled, heated through steaming at standard boiling temperatures of 100 °C (212 °F), and then dried or sun-dried. It is frequently marinated in an herbal brew which results in the root becoming extremely brittle.

== Production ==
Commercial ginseng is sold in over 35 countries, with China as the largest consumer. In 2013, global sales of ginseng exceeded $2 billion, of which half was produced by South Korea. In the early 21st century, 99% of the world's 80,000 tons of ginseng was produced in just four countries: China (44,749 tons), South Korea (27,480 tons), Canada (6,486 tons), and the United States (1,054 tons). All ginseng produced in South Korea is Korean ginseng (P. ginseng), while ginseng produced in China includes P. ginseng, South China ginseng (P. notoginseng), and the recently introduced American ginseng (P. quinquefolius). Ginseng produced in Canada and the United States is mostly P. quinquefolius.

As of 2020, global P. ginseng and P. quinquefolius production each sum to an approximate 7,000 tons on a dry-weight basis. On a dry-weight basis, 70% of P. ginseng and 30% of P. quinquefolius is produced in China; 60% of P. quinquefolius is produced in Canada; and 10% of P. quinquefolius is produced in the US. P. ginseng is also cultivated in Japan.

== Uses ==
=== Food or beverage ===
The root is most often available in dried form, either whole or sliced. In Korean cuisine, ginseng is used in various banchan (side dishes) and guk (soups), as well as tea and alcoholic beverages. Ginseng-infused tea and liquor, known as insam-cha (lit. 'ginseng tea') and insam-ju ('ginseng liquor') is consumed. Ginseng leaves are also used to prepare foods and beverages. Leaves are used to prepare Asian soups, steamed with chicken or combined with ginger, dates, and pork, or are eaten fresh.

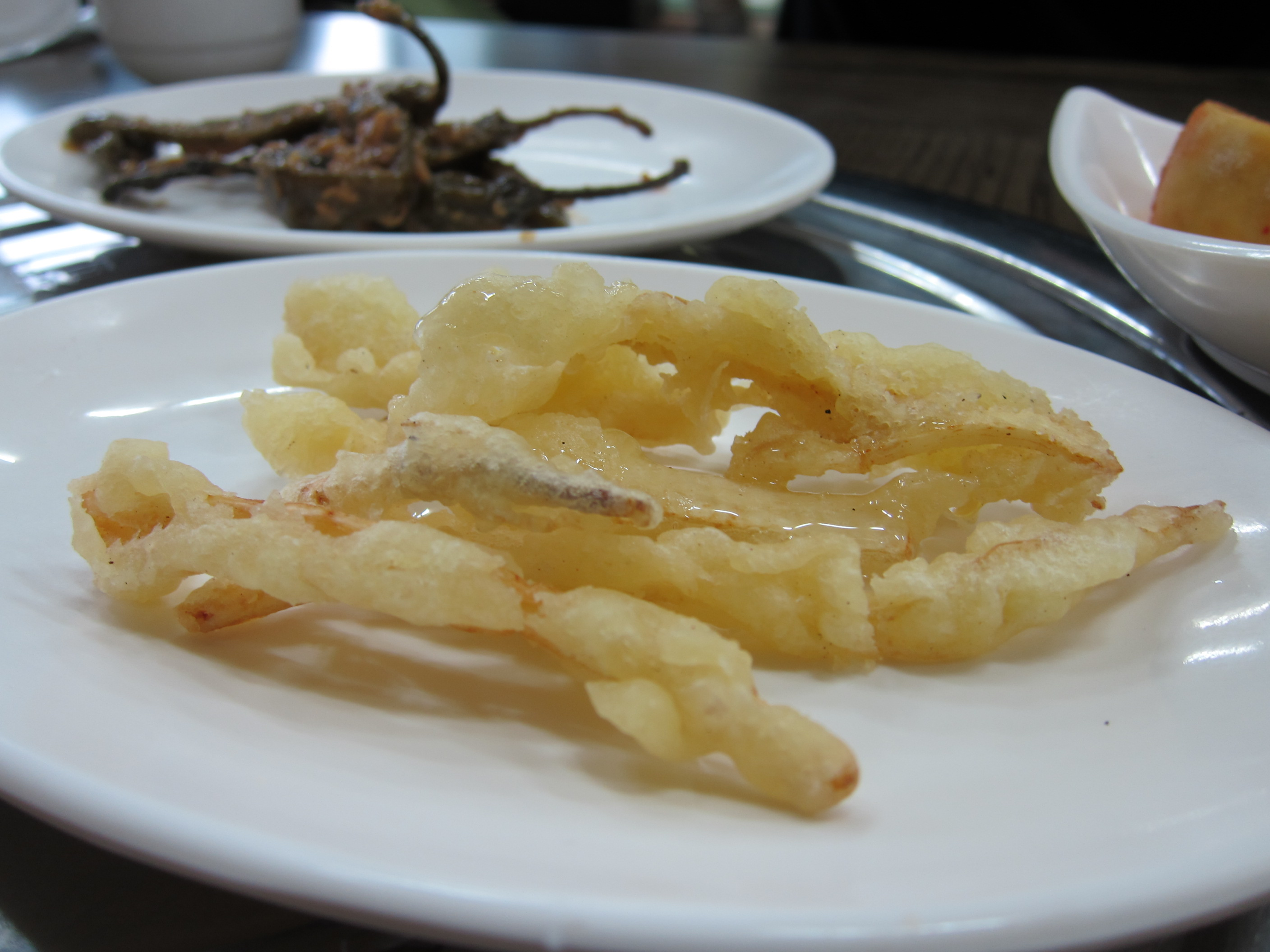
insam-twigim (ginseng fritters)

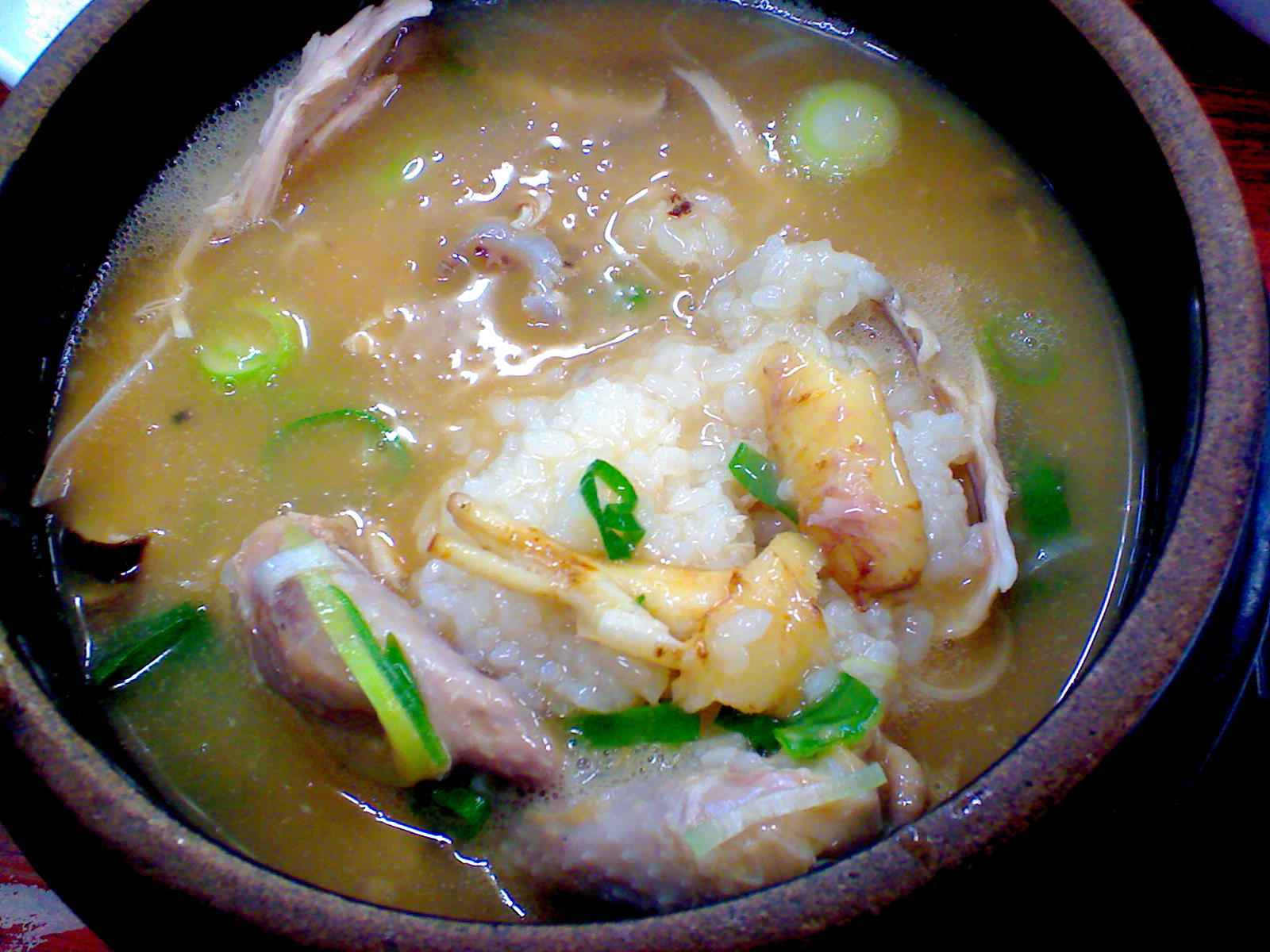
samgye-tang (ginseng chicken soup)

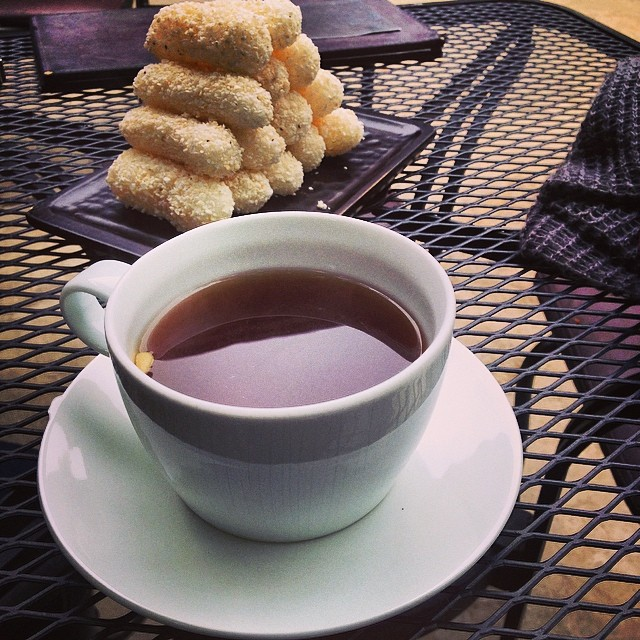
insam-cha (ginseng tea) and yugwa (rice puffs)

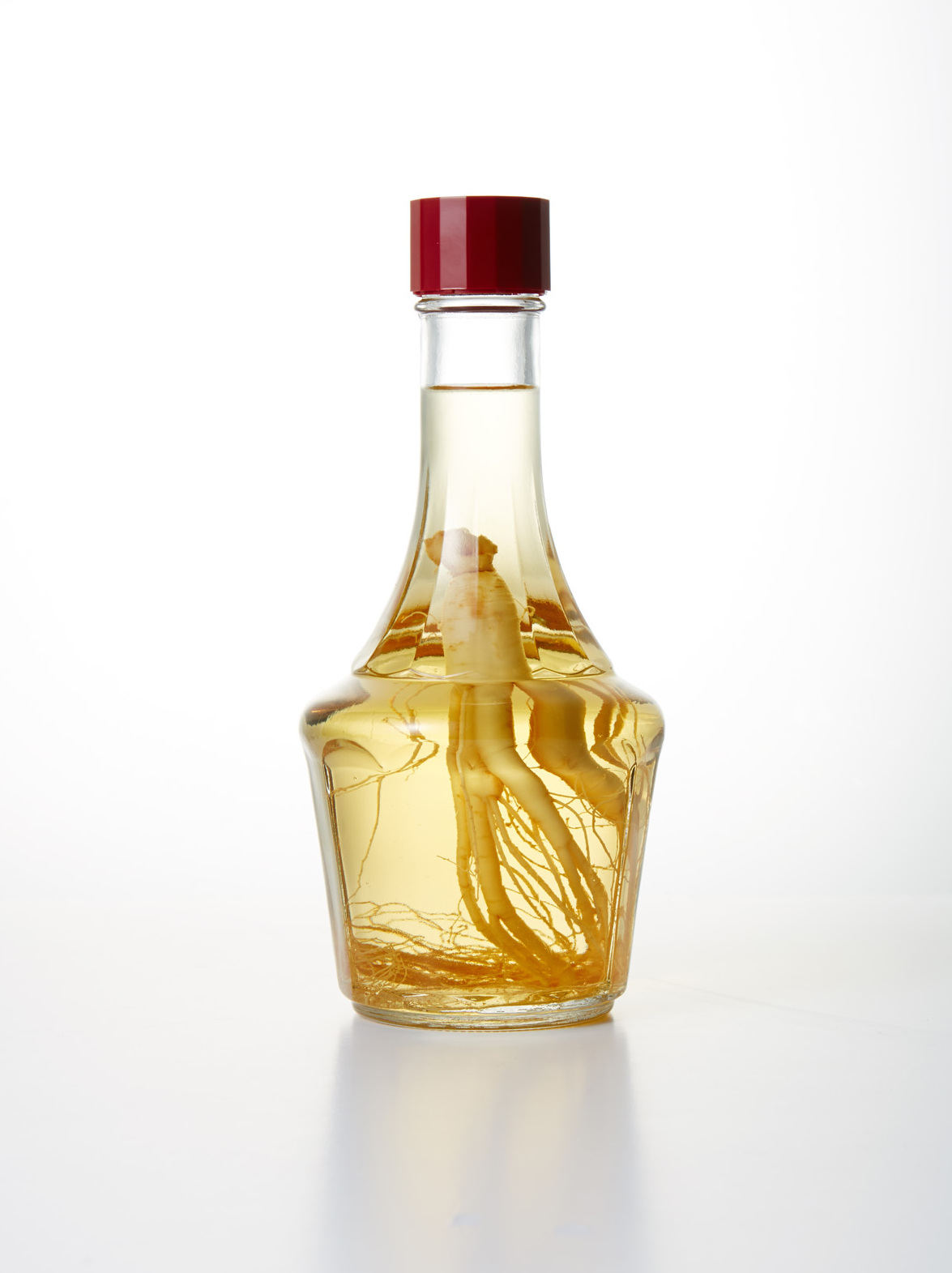
insam-ju (ginseng liquor)

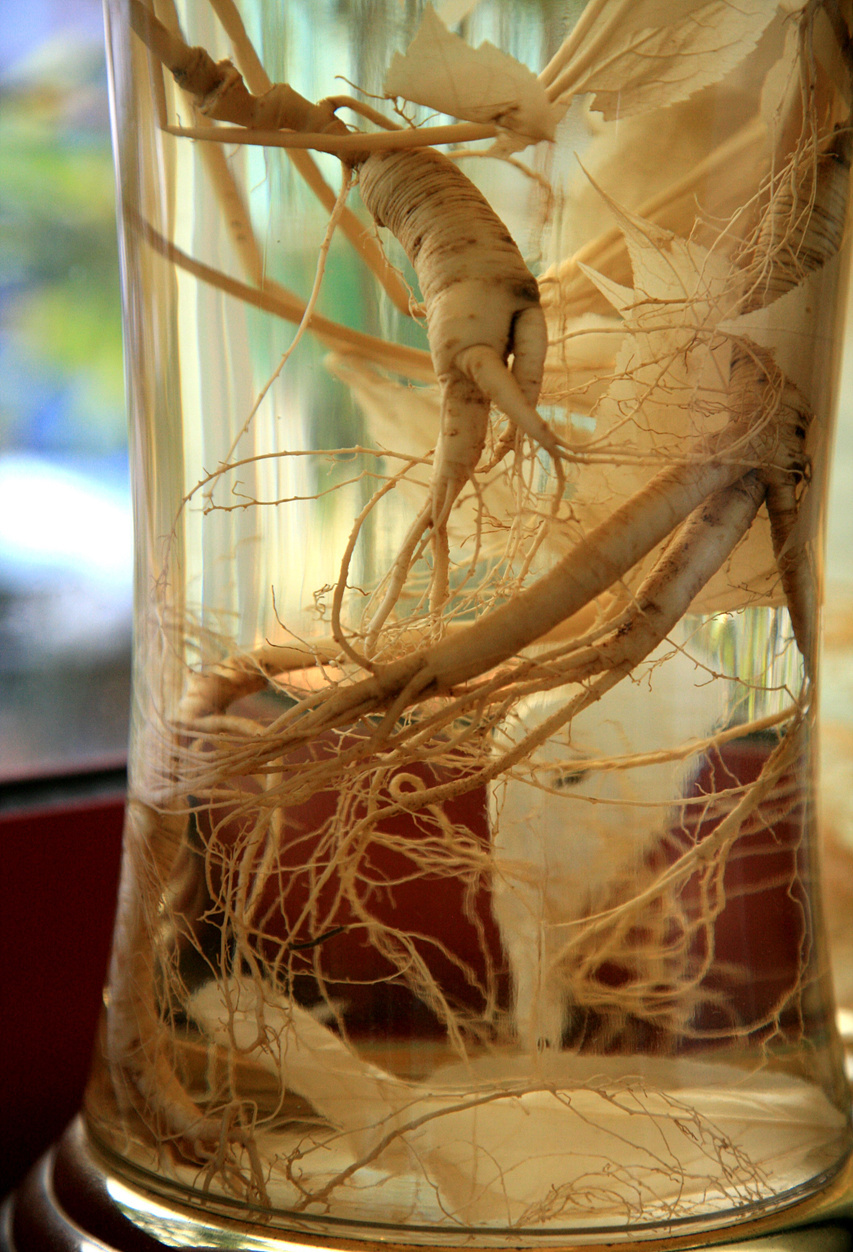
sansam-ju (wild ginseng liquor)

Ginseng may be included in energy drinks or herbal teas in small amounts or sold as a dietary supplement.

=== Historical use ===
One of the first written texts covering the use of ginseng as a medicinal herb was the Shen Nong Pharmacopoeia, written in China in 196 AD. In his Compendium of Materia Medica herbal of 1596, Li Shizhen described ginseng as a "superior tonic". However, the herb was not used as a "cure-all" medicine, but more specifically as a tonic for patients with chronic illnesses and those who were convalescing. Control over ginseng fields in China and Korea became an issue in the 16th century.

=== In folk belief ===
In Chinese folk tales from the northeastern regions, ginseng is said to transform into children, often depicted with skyward-reaching braids, sometimes tied with red ribbons, and occasionally dressed in dudous. In these stories, a ginseng child will typically enter a house to play with another child. However, if the adults tie a red ribbon around the child's feet, the child vanishes. When they follow the ribbon, they find it tied to a blade of grass, and upon digging, they uncover a ginseng root.

=== Animal feed ===
A tincture of Korean ginseng is approved by the EFSA for use in horses, dogs, and cats as a sensory additive (animal feed flavoring). Within the provided dose limits, the tincture is considered non-toxic. A dried extract of Korean ginseng was declined by the EFSA, since its manufacturer cannot provide data on its complete composition.

== Effectiveness ==
=== Clinical research ===
Although ginseng has been used in traditional medicine for centuries, there is no good evidence from clinical research that it causes any improvement of health or lowers the risk of any disease. Research indicates there are no confirmed effects on memory, fatigue, menopause symptoms, or insulin response in people with mild diabetes. A 2021 review indicated that ginseng had "only trivial effects on erectile function or satisfaction with intercourse compared to placebo".

=== Phytochemicals ===
Phytochemical constituents include steroid saponins known as ginsenosides, as well as polyacetylenes, polysaccharides, peptidoglycans, and polyphenols, among other compounds.

Although the roots are used in traditional Chinese medicine, the leaves and stems contain larger quantities of the signature phytochemicals than the roots, and are easier to harvest.

Plant tissue culture has also been used to produce a fast-growing biomass, an alternative to naturally-formed ginseng root. The hairy-root approach using Rhizobium rhizogenes produces higher levels of signature phytochemicals such as ginsenosides compared to the suspended cell and adventitious root approaches.

=== FDA and warning letters ===
Ginseng supplements are not subjected to the same pre-market approval process in the US by the Food and Drug Administration (FDA) as pharmaceutical drugs. FDA mandates that manufacturers must ensure the safety of their ginseng supplements before marketing, without the necessity to substantiate the safety and efficacy of these supplements in a pre-market scenario. The FDA has classified ginseng as "generally recognized as safe" (GRAS), indicating its general tolerability in adult populations.

As of 2019, the United States FDA and Federal Trade Commission have issued numerous warning letters to manufacturers of ginseng dietary supplements for making false claims of health or anti-disease benefits, stating that the "products are not generally recognized as safe and effective for the referenced uses" and are illegal as unauthorized "new drugs" under federal law.

=== Side effects ===
Ginseng generally has a good safety profile and the incidence of adverse effects is minor when used over the short term. Ginseng supplements can be complex, often containing multiple constituents. It is not uncommon to observe discrepancies between the ingredients listed on the product label and the actual components or their quantities present in the supplement. While manufacturers can employ independent organizations to authenticate the quality of a product or its ingredients, such verification does not equate to a certification of the product's safety or effectiveness. These independent quality checks primarily focus on the integrity of the product in terms of its composition and do not extend to safety evaluations or purported clinical efficacy. Recent supplement products have included ginseng as a core ingredient in formulations aimed at enhancing vitality, stamina, and hormonal balance in men. Its adaptogenic properties are often highlighted in these products.

The risk of interactions between ginseng and medical prescriptions is believed to be low, but ginseng may have adverse effects when used with blood thinners. Ginseng interacts with certain blood thinner medications, such as warfarin, leading to decreased blood levels of these drugs. Ginseng can also potentiate the effects of sedative medications. Concerns exist when ginseng is used over a longer term, potentially causing side effects such as skin rashes, headaches, insomnia, and digestive problems. The long-term use of ginseng may result in nervousness, anxiety, diarrhea, confusion, depression, or feelings of depersonalization, nausea, and fluctuations in blood pressure (including hypertension). There have been reports of gynecomastia and breast pain associated with ginseng use. Other side effects include breast pain and vaginal bleeding. As of 2023, there is a lack of data regarding the safety and efficacy of ginseng in lactating mothers and infants. Given its potential estrogenic activity and the absence of safety data during lactation, ginseng is not recommended for use during breastfeeding. Ginseng also has adverse drug reactions with phenelzine, and a potential interaction has been reported with imatinib, resulting in hepatotoxicity, and with lamotrigine.

=== Risk of overdose ===
The common ginsengs (P. ginseng and P. quinquefolia) are generally considered to be relatively safe even in large amounts. One of the most common and characteristic symptoms of an acute overdose of P. ginseng is bleeding. Symptoms of mild overdose may include dry mouth and lips, excitation, fidgeting, irritability, tremor, palpitations, blurred vision, headache, insomnia, increased body temperature, increased blood pressure, edema, decreased appetite, dizziness, itching, eczema, early morning diarrhea, bleeding, and fatigue.

Symptoms of severe overdose with P. ginseng may include nausea, vomiting, irritability, restlessness, urinary and bowel incontinence, fever, increased blood pressure, increased respiration, decreased sensitivity and reaction to light, decreased heart rate, cyanotic (blue) facial complexion, red facial complexion, seizures, convulsions, and delirium.

== See also ==
- Herbalism
- List of herbs with known adverse effects
