= Ginseng tea =

Herbal tea infusion

- Hangul: 인삼차
- Hanja: 人蔘茶
- RR: insamcha
- MR: insamch'a
- IPA: [in.sam.tɕʰa]

Ginseng root hair tea
- Hangul: 미삼차
- Hanja: 尾蔘茶
- RR: misamcha
- MR: misamch'a
- IPA: [mi.sam.tɕʰa]

Red ginseng tea
- Hangul: 홍삼차
- Hanja: 紅蔘茶
- RR: hongsamcha
- MR: hongsamch'a
- IPA: [hoŋ.sam.tɕʰa]

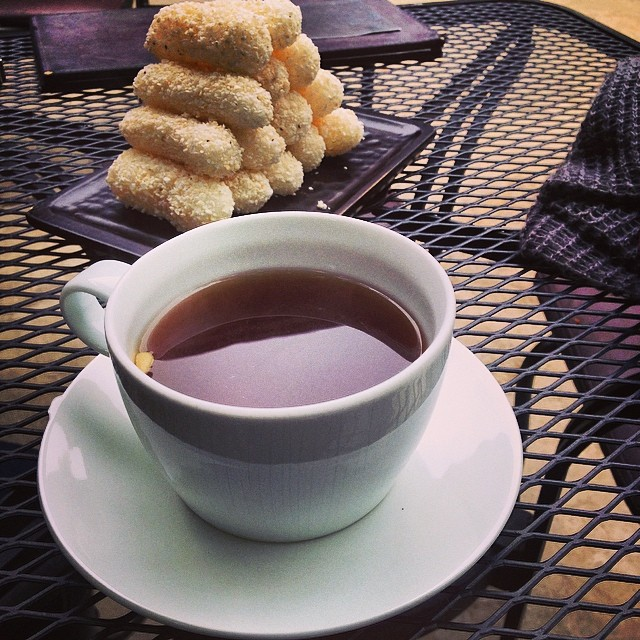
Insam-cha and yugwa

Ginseng tea, or insam-cha (Korean: 인삼차; Hanja: 人蔘茶; insam means ginseng and cha means tea in Korean), is a traditional Korean tea made with ginseng. While it is called a tea, ginseng tea does not contain tea leaves; it is a herbal tea infusion made out of the ginseng plant's root. Ginseng is a perennial herb derived from the aromatic root of Panax ginseng, also known as Korean ginseng. Ginseng grows in shady forests that are cool and damp. It is a slow-growing plant and difficult to cultivate. It can take four to six years before the root is ready to be harvested. Ginseng roots have a forked and twisted appearance that somewhat resembles the human body.

Ginseng roots have been used in East Asian countries for more than 2,000 years. The roots can be used fresh; however, there are various forms which can be processed in different ways for different uses. Fresh roots can be processed into red ginseng (홍삼, hongsam) by steaming and drying, or into white ginseng (백삼, paeksam) by a simpler process of air-drying.

== Preparation ==
Ginseng roots are often ground or powdered but also can be soaked to make an extract or herbal tincture. Tea can be made from the ground ginseng.

Ginseng tea is traditionally prepared with Korean ginseng along with jujubes and dried Korean chestnuts. These are decocted for several hours over a low heat, sweetened with honey, and served with Korean pine nuts floating on top. Either fresh ginseng (수삼; 水蔘; susam) or red ginseng (홍삼; 紅蔘; hongsam) can be used.

Ginseng tea can be found in a fine dry-powder packaged form or a dried grated form.

== History ==
Ginseng was sought after in the ancient East Asian world. During the Warring States period of China (475–221 BC), the preparation of ginseng tea was associated with good health and high status. During the Ming era (1368–1644), Li Shizen documented Korean ginseng tea in his "Great Compendium of Herbs". The 21st monarch of the Joseon Dynasty, King Yeongju, drank Geongongtang—a ginseng-infused tea—to preserve his health. In the Annals of King Jeongjo (1776–1800) which is part of the Joseon Dynasty Annals, the term "red ginseng" was recorded. The popularity of ginseng reached the western world according to text written as early as 1274 referencing Marco Polo canonizing it in different forms such as syrups, powders, roots, and as a tea.

During the Goryeo dynasty, ginseng tea is documented as a way to strengthen the body of the user to resist stress-related illnesses or complications.

== Risks ==
A medical professional should be consulted before taking ginseng. Ginseng may cause interactions with blood thinning and anti-coagulant medications such as dalteparin (Fragmin), ticlopidine (Ticlid), warfarin (Coumodin), clopidogrel (Plavix), aspirin; nonsteroidal anti-inflammatory drugs and blood pressure medications. Since ginseng can lower blood sugar levels, people with type 2 diabetes and those taking insulin or other medications that also lower blood sugar, should be monitored if they start taking ginseng. It is not recommended to give ginseng to children or adolescents.

== Benefits ==
Several studies have shown that ginseng may boost the immune system and lower blood sugar; as it contains many antioxidants, ginseng can also reduce inflammation, and there is some evidence that ginseng might benefit brain-function and give a small, short-term boost to concentration and learning.

As a widely popular natural health item amongst Koreans, red ginseng in particular is available in various forms such as liquid, capsule, powder, round root, and even candies like jelly. Fans of this supplement consume it to relieve fatigue, increase natural immunity, and improve blood circulation. Currently at least two trials have been run to test the effectiveness of ginseng on memory cognition and in both trials, adults who were given ginseng showed a significant increase in memory function compared to their placebo groups. One trial was conducted by Professor Kim Man-ho at Seoul National University College of Medicine and the other was conducted under Professor David Ormonde Kennedy at Northumbria University.

According to the Journal of Ethnopharmacology, ginseng, regardless of where it is grown or cultivated from is believed to provide tonic rejuvenation, antioxidation, antifatigue, and neuroprotective properties to the consumer; implying the location ginseng is grown should have no effect on the probable benefits.

However, all research and claims still lack extensive research and trials and a medical professional should be consulted prior to beginning treatment or supplementary care utilizing red ginseng in any form or quantity.

== See also ==
- Insam-ju, Korean ginseng wine or liquor
