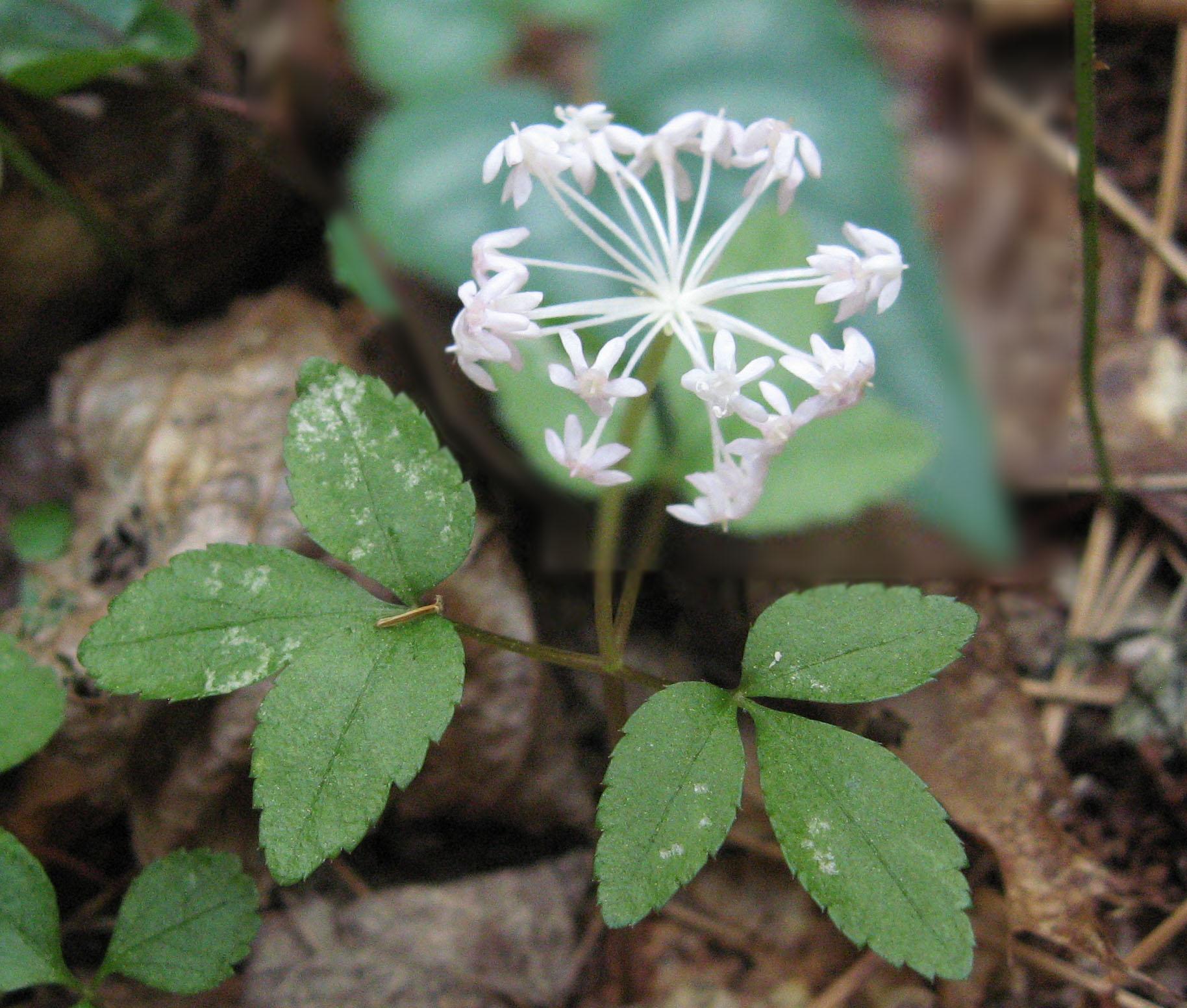

Scientific classification
- Kingdom: Plantae
- Clade: Tracheophytes
- Clade: Angiosperms
- Clade: Eudicots
- Clade: Asterids
- Order: Apiales
- Family: Araliaceae
- Genus: Panax
- Subgenus: P. subg. Trifolius
- Species: P. trifolius

Binomial name
- Panax trifolius L.

= Panax trifolius =

Species of plant

Panax trifolius, commonly called dwarf ginseng, is a plant native to the Northeastern and Appalachian regions of North America. It is found in low mesic woods with acidic soils.

It produces an umbel of white flowers in late spring. This species was used for traditional medicine by Native Americans. Its tubers can be eaten raw or boiled.

The distribution of the plant is inconsistent and can become disjunct as it appears frequently in one area and absent in another with suitable habitat. The plant is a part of the Araliaceae and occurs in a similar region with the more notable relative, Panax quinquefolium. It is sometimes referred to as "groundnut" due to the roots exhibiting a nutty flavor when eaten raw.

== Description ==
The root of the ginseng (Panax trifolius) is knobby and resembles a potato with a fleshy appearance. The plant grows to be about 4-8 inches high with tiny white or pink flowers that are about 2mm wide, radially symmetrical, and cluster in a spherical shape. Each flower will have five petals that are white but fade to pink as the fruit ripens to a yellow color. The shoot has a singular stem containing a whorl of three or more leaves per node. Each leaf will contain three to five leaflets with the middle leaflet being the largest. All leaflets are 2.5-3.8 mm long with rigid edges. There can be five stamen, petals, sepals, or tepals on the flower that are separated and not fused. The rigid seeds of the plant are 2.5mm-3.5mm long, white in color, and have a coat that they shed each fall before germination. Each hermaphroditic flower of the plant will have three carpellate ovaries that make one seed each resulting in a slow rate of dispersal.

== Taxonomy ==
Carl Von Linnaeus initially described this species. The word "Panax" is Greek for "all remedy" which refers to the assumption of the ancient Chinese believing that the plant was a panacea. The prefix "tri" in "trifolius" means three while "folius" means leaves, consequently the term "trifolius" refers to the three leaflets that make up the compound leaves on the plant. Synonyms for the plant include the name "Nanopanax trifolius".

== Distribution and habitat ==
Panax trifolius grows in mesic forests or on the banks of small streams or rivers in undisturbed areas. They grow abundantly in moist rich soil on flat land in a full or semi-shady position. It can be found in woodlands or damp clearings in eastern deciduous forests of North America. The range in distribution can be from Ontario, Canada to the east of Nova Scotia; South of Georgia, northwest of Kentucky, Indiana, and Minnesota. The plant has adapted to a short growing season allowing it to be tolerant of colder climates.

== Uses ==
Although there is very little research on the medicinal use of the plant, it was still used by Native American tribes. The whole plant was used as a tea, or the root was eaten or chewed on. It was used as a tea to help aid in colic, indigestion, gout, or hives. The root could be eaten raw or boiled, was used for headaches, fainting, or shortness of breath.

== Propagation ==
The seeds that are dispersed by gravity need to be sown in shady areas of moist soil soon after maturity. Seeds that drop in the fall and require a chilling period through the winter before germinating the following spring the seed coat splits and sheds. The rate at which the seed germinates is relatively low and unpredictable due to the seed having to wait until the growing season.

== Conservation ==
The species is widespread throughout Eastern America and in parts of Canada. It is mostly secure in places but is classified as vulnerable in parts of Quebec, Chicago, Virginia, and North Carolina. The plant is classified as critically imperiled in Georgia.

== Natural history ==
Panax trifolius has three growth phases where the smallest is vegetative and produces leaves but no flowers. The male gender phase produces staminate flowers while the hermaphroditic phase produces perfect flowers or flowers with both a stamen and carpel. Although hermaphrodites have both male and female organs, it mostly operates as a female. The hermaphrodites have 6-8 flowers while males have 15-20. The male flowers stay in bloom twice as long as the hermaphroditic flowers with an average of 15 days compared to 6 for the male flowers. The plant has the ability to switch its sexes from male to hermaphrodite and hermaphrodite back to male. These changes can happen multiple times from one year to the next and can be caused by the plants response to conditions that can hinder reproductive abilities. Sex is expressed by size and environmentally determined by resources accumulated during that growing season which affects the cost of reproduction. Hermaphrodites are larger in size and their reproductive effort is eight times that of males. The different plant types can occur in all phases simultaneously in one area.

== Bibliography ==
- Hu, Shiu Ying; Rüdenberg, Lily; Del Tredici, Peter (1980). "Studies of American ginsengs". Rhodora. 82 (832): 627–636. ISSN 0035-4902. JSTOR 23314100.
