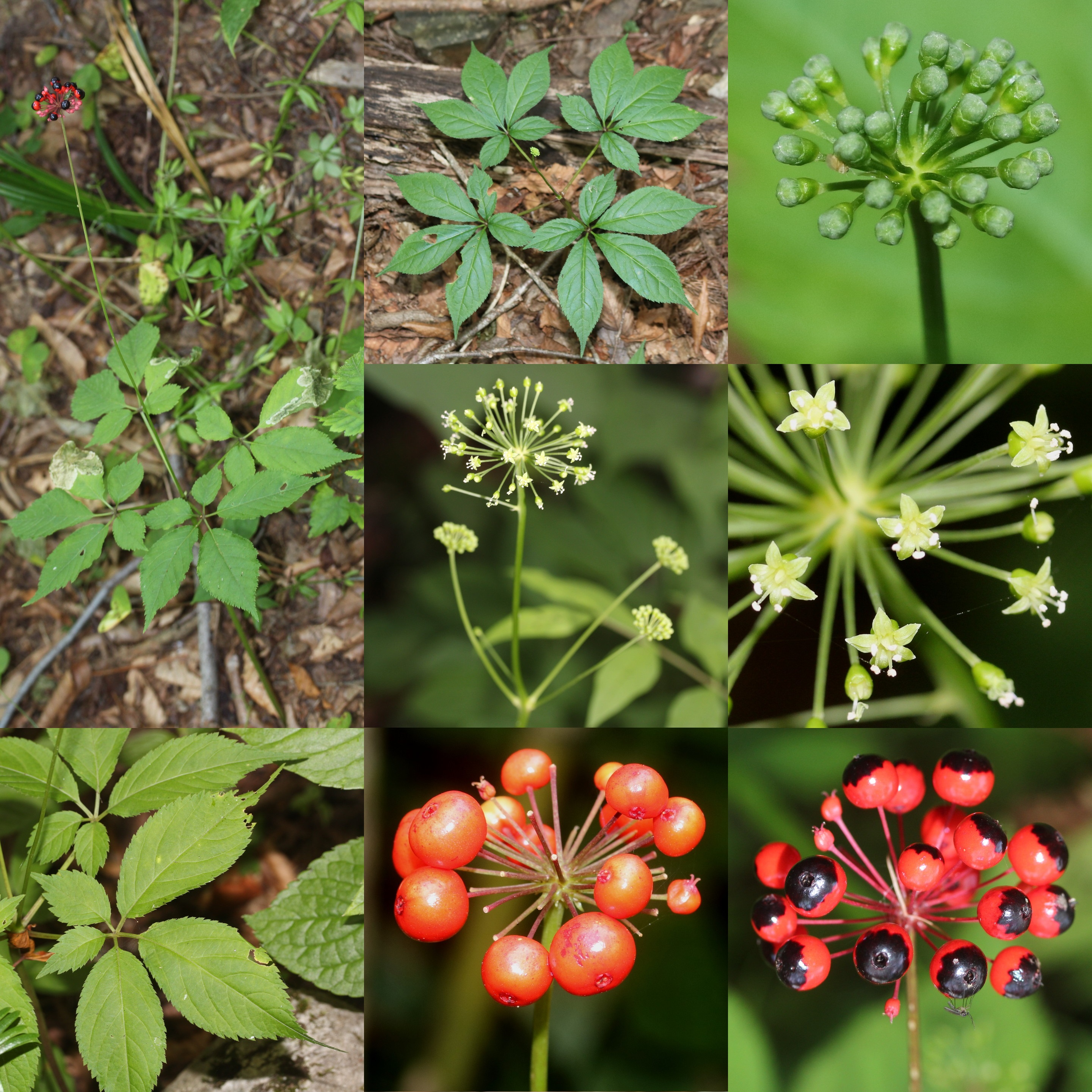

Scientific classification
- Kingdom: Plantae
- Clade: Tracheophytes
- Clade: Angiosperms
- Clade: Eudicots
- Clade: Asterids
- Order: Apiales
- Family: Araliaceae
- Genus: Panax
- Species: P. japonicus

Binomial name
- Panax japonicus (T.Nees) C.A.Mey.

= Panax japonicus =

Species of flowering plant

Panax japonicus is a species of ginseng known for its bamboo-shaped, uneven-sized roots. It is found throughout Japan and Korea, and is also said to be endangered in China.

Panax japonicus sees some use in Japanese Kampo medicine and traditional Chinese medicine. Like other ginsengs, it contains a number of ginsenosides.

There is no English-language literature on its cultivation, though Baeg et al. (2013) lists it among cultivated ginseng species. There is, however, a considerable volume of Chinese literature on its cultivation under the name Zhújiéshēn.

== Varieties ==
Flora of China cites Panax japonicus var. major (Burkill) C. Y. Wu & K. M. Feng as a variety of this species, though Plants of the World Online treats it as a synonym of Panax bipinnatifidus var. bipinnatifidus. cpDNA analysis supports the affiliation of the variety with P. j. This variety is also used in traditional Chinese medicine under the name Zhūzĭshēn. There is also a large amount of Chinese literature on its cultivation.
