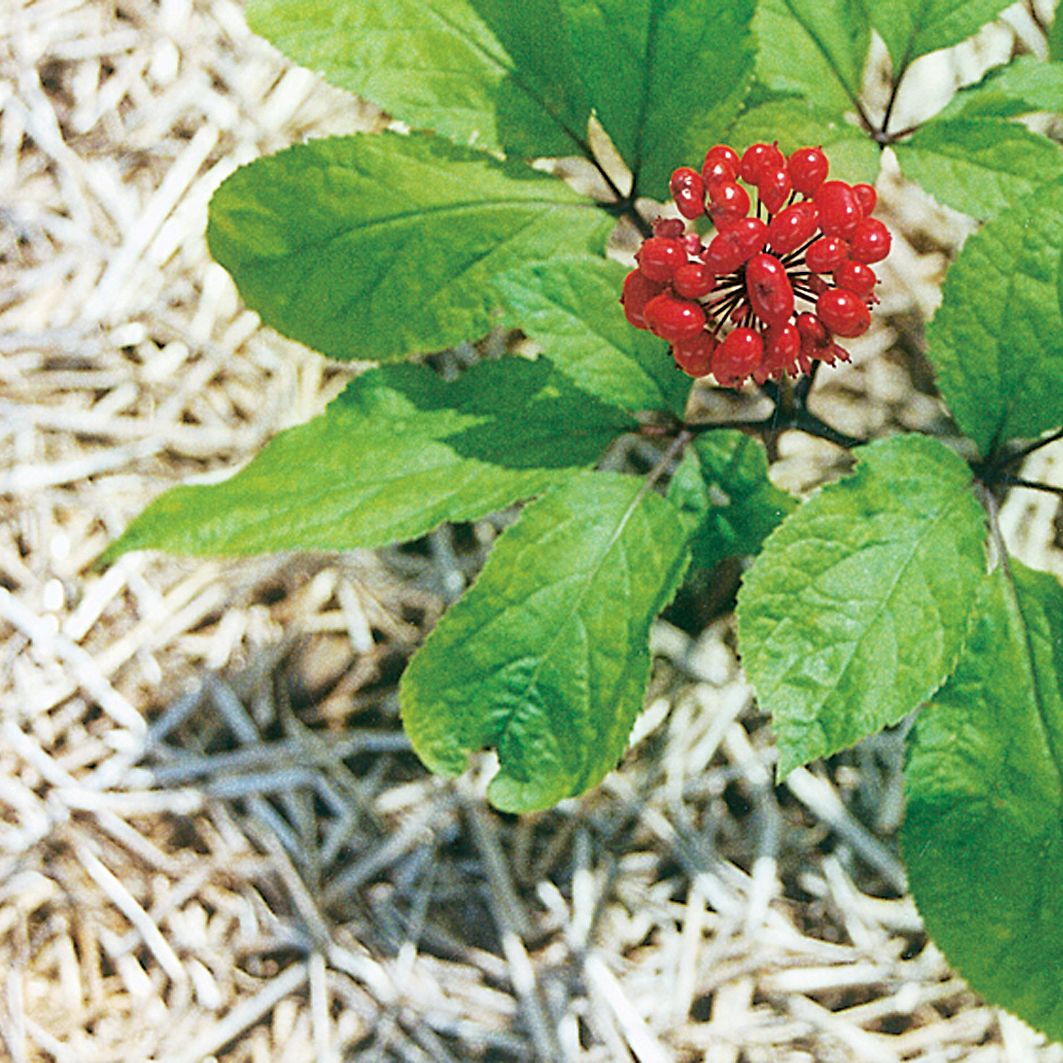

Scientific classification
- Kingdom: Plantae
- Clade: Tracheophytes
- Clade: Angiosperms
- Clade: Eudicots
- Clade: Asterids
- Order: Apiales
- Family: Araliaceae
- Genus: Panax
- Species: P. ginseng

Binomial name
- Panax ginseng C.A.Mey.

Synonyms
- Aralia ginseng (C.A.Mey.) Baill.; Panax verus Oken

= Panax ginseng =

Species of flowering plant

Panax ginseng, ginseng, also known as Asian ginseng, Chinese ginseng or Korean ginseng, is a species of plant whose root is the original source of ginseng. It is a perennial plant that grows in the mountains of East Asia. It is mainly cultivated in China, Korea, Russia, and Japan.

P. ginseng is an herbaceous perennial plant, 30–60 cm tall, with palmately compound leaves, serrated leaflets, a terminal umbel of 30–50 flowers, red round fruits, and kidney-shaped seeds.

P. ginseng is primarily cultivated in Korea. While all South Korean ginseng is P. ginseng, ginseng production in China encompasses both P. ginseng and South China ginseng (Panax notoginseng).

There is little evidence that using P. ginseng provides any health effect. It may cause side effects or interact with various medications and conditions.

== Names ==
Panax ginseng is called rénshēn (人蔘 or 人参 or 人參; lit. 'ginseng') in Mandarin (Chinese), insam (Korean: 인삼; Hanja: 人蔘) in Korean, nhân sâm in Vietnamese and ninjin (人参) in Japanese. The specific epithet ginseng means "man-herb" or "forked root".

== Description ==
Panax ginseng is a herbaceous perennial growing from 30 to 60 cm tall. Plants have a spindle- or cylinder-shaped taproot, usually with 1 or 2 main branches. Plants produce 3 to 6 leaves that are palmately compound, with each leaf having 3 to 5 leaflets. The margins of the leaflets are densely serrated. The flowers are born in a solitary inflorescence that is a terminal umbel with 30 to 50 flowers. The peduncles of the flowers are 15 to 30 cm long. The flower ovary is 2-carpellate, with each carpel having two distinct styles. Mature fruits are 4–5 x 6–7 millimeters in size, red in color, and round with flattened ends. The white seeds are kidney-shaped. The (2n) diploid chromosome count is 48.

== Taxonomy ==
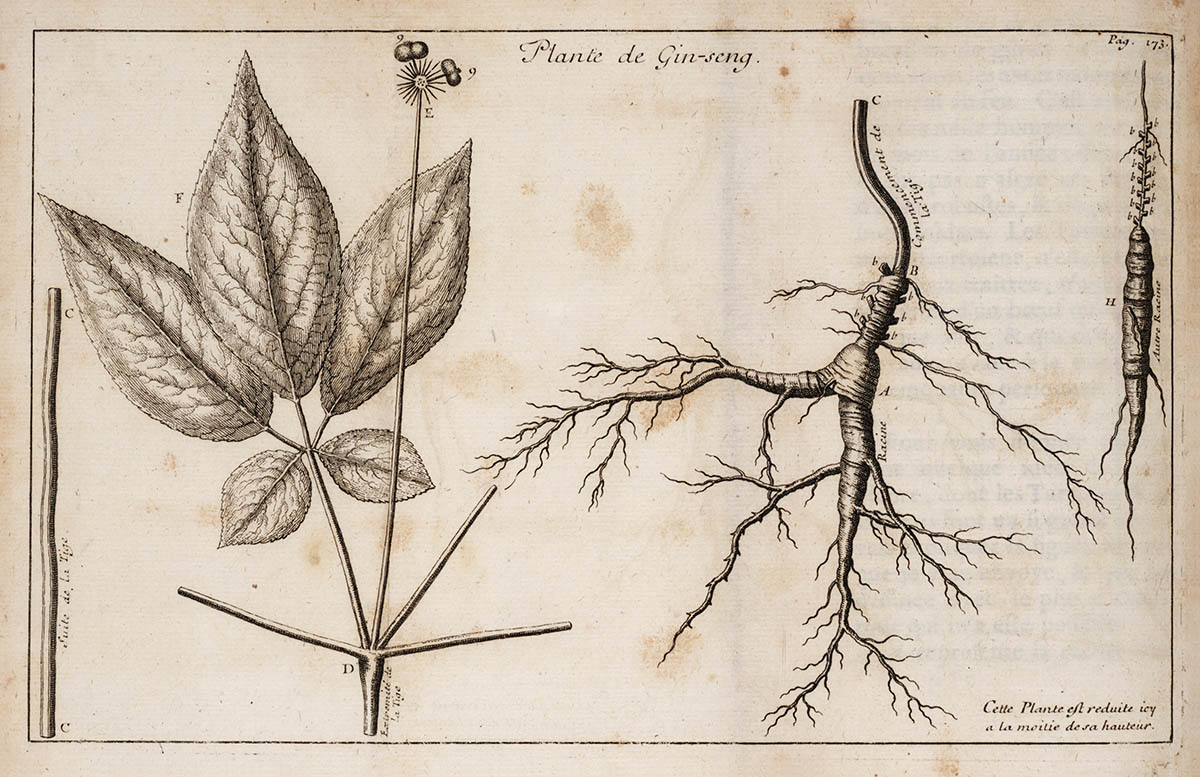
Panax ginseng illustrated by Pierre Jartoux in 1713

In a letter dated 12 April 1711, the French Jesuit mathematician and cartographer Pierre Jartoux described gin-seng, a Chinese name for a plant now known as Panax ginseng. According to Jartoux, the name means "form of man", which refers to the shape of the root.

== Distribution ==
Panax ginseng is native to mountainous regions of the Russian Far East, Northeast China, and the Korean Peninsula. It is a protected plant in Russia and China, and most commercial ginseng is now sourced from plants cultivated in China, Korea and Russia. It is also cultivated in some areas of Japan and in Wisconsin. The plant is a slow-growing perennial, and the roots are usually harvested when the plants are five or six years old.

== Cultivation ==
Panax ginseng is one of the most commonly cultivated ginseng species, along with P. notoginseng (found naturally in China) and P. quinquefolius.

== Research ==
There is little evidence for ginseng having health effects. Ginseng phytochemicals, such as ginsenosides, are under preliminary research for their potential to affect aging-related disorders.

Panax ginseng is generally considered safe for adults when used for less than six months, but may be unsafe over the long-term, and has potential for causing adverse interactions with various prescription drugs, such as warfarin.

== Potential for adverse effects ==
Use of Panax ginseng during pregnancy and breastfeeding is potentially unsafe. It may have adverse effects in people with immune disorders, bleeding conditions, cardiovascular diseases or cancer. It should not be used by children.

Common side effects include headache, an increase in blood pressure, diarrhea, insomnia, skin rash, and vaginal bleeding.

== Folk medicine ==
Ginseng is used as an herb in folk medicine.

== See also ==
- American ginseng

== Bibliography ==
- Brinckmann, Josef; Huang, Linfang (2018-11-01). "American Ginseng a Genuine Traditional Chinese Medicine". Medicina Nei Secoli: Journal of History of Medicine and Medical Humanities. 30 (3): 907–928. ISSN 0394-9001.
- Gledhill, David (2008). The Names of Plants (4th ed.). Cambridge University Press. ISBN 978-0-521-86645-3.
- Jartoux, Pierre (1713). "XXV. The description of a tartarian plant, call'd gin-seng; with an account of its virtues. In a letter from Father Jartoux, to the Procurator General of the Missions of India and China. Taken from the tenth volume of letters of the Missionary Jesuits, printed in Paris in octavo, 1713". Philosophical Transactions of the Royal Society of London. 28 (337): 237–247. doi:10.1098/rstl.1713.0025.
