= Dit da jow =

Chinese liniment

- Chinese: 跌打酒
- Literal meaning: Fall hit wine
Transcriptions
Standard Mandarin
- Hanyu Pinyin: diédǎjiǔ
Yue: Cantonese
- Yale Romanization: dit dá jáu
- Jyutping: dit^{3} daa^{2} zau^{2}
- IPA: [tit̚˧ ta˧˥ tsɐw˧˥]

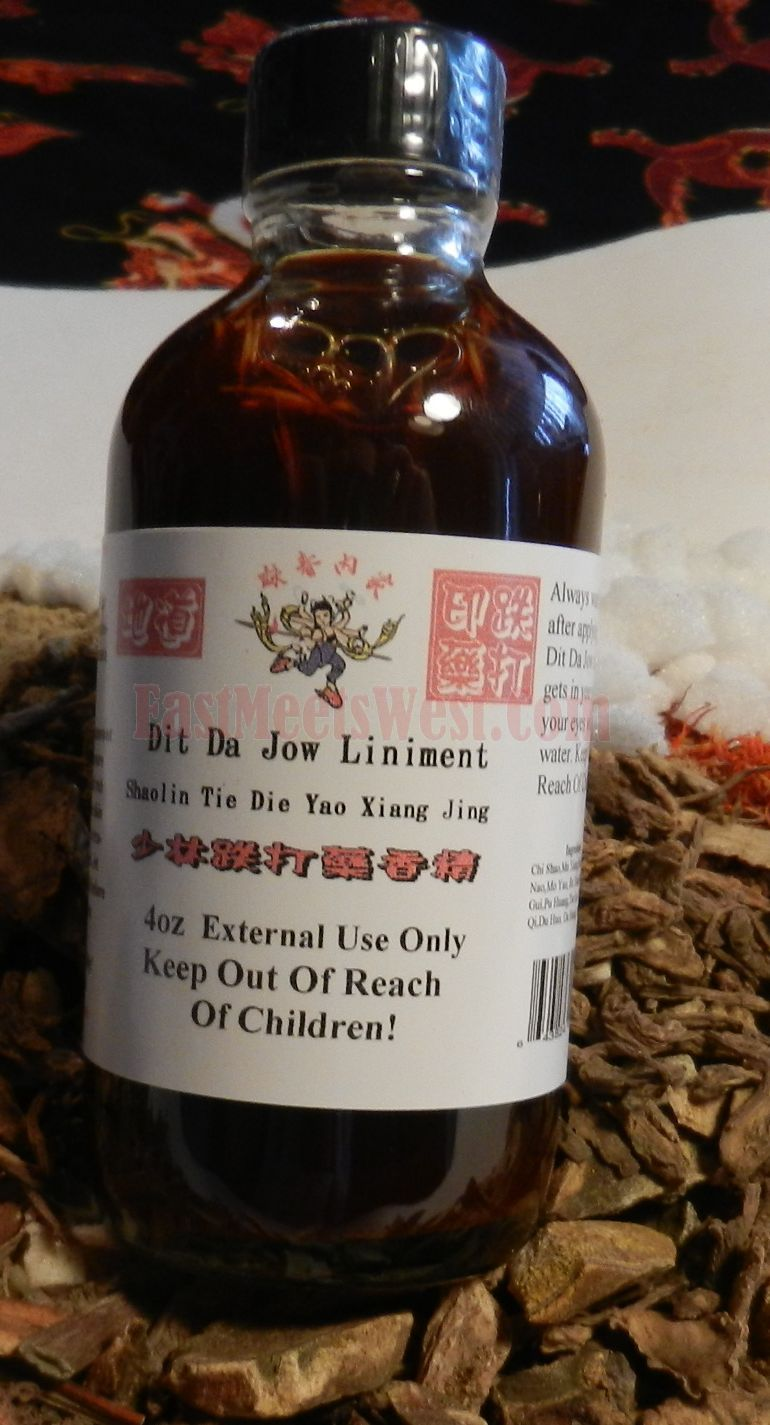
Dit da jow in a glass bottle

Dit da jow (Jyutping: dit3 daa2 zau2; pinyin: Diē dǎ jiǔ) is a common Chinese liniment used as traditional medicine in the belief it can reduce the pain from external injuries.

== Description ==
Dit da jow – thought to be an analgesic liniment preferred by martial artists – is made from herbs put in a jar and mixed with an alcohol, such as rice wine or yellow wine.

== Typical ingredients ==
The herbs and other ingredients are typically coarse-ground, then steeped in alcohol (vodka or rice wine is common), sometimes with heat, and then aged.

=== Chinese Pharmacopoeia formula ===
The 2020 Edition of the Chinese Pharmacopoeia lists one "Feng Liaoxing's Medicated Liquor for Arthritis and Dieda" (Chinese: 冯了性风湿跌打药酒; pinyin: Fénɡliǎoxìnɡ Fēnɡshī Diēdǎ Yàojiǔ). It is a baijiu extract of the following ingredients (amounts given for 10-kilogram batch of baijiu):

- 丁公藤 Erycibe obtusifolia or E. schmidtii stem/vine, 2500 g
- 桂枝 Cinnamomum cassia young branches, 75 g
- 麻黄 Ephedra (medicine) "ma-huang", 93.8 g
- 羌活 Notopterygium incisum or N. franchetii rhizome and root, 7.5 g
- 当归 Angelica sinensis root, 7.5 g
- 川芎 Ligusticum chuanxiong rhizome, 7.5 g
- 白芷 Angelica dahurica root, 7.5 g
- 补骨脂 Psoralea corylifolia fruit, 7.5 g
- 乳香 frankincense "ru-xiang", 7.5 g
- 猪牙皂 Gleditsia sinensis infertile fruits, 7.5 g
- 陈皮 Citrus reticulata peel, 33.1 g
- 苍术 Atractylodes lancea or A. chinensis rhizome, 7.5 g
- 厚朴 Magnolia officinalis bark (trunk, root, branch), 7.5 g
- 香附 Cyperus rotundus rhizome, 7.5 g
- 木香 Aucklandia lappa root, 7.5 g
- 枳壳 Citrus aurantium unripe fruit, 50 g
- 白术 Atractylodes macrocephala rhizome, 7.5 g
- 山药 Chinese yam rhizome, 7.5 g
- 黄精 Polygonatum kingianum, P. sibiricum, or P. cyrtonema rhizome, 20 g
- 菟丝子 Cuscuta australis or C. chinensis mature seed, 7.5 g
- 小茴香 Foeniculum vulgare fruit 7.5 g
- 苦杏仁 Prunus armeniaca var. ansu, P. sibirica, P. mandshurica or P. armeniaca mature seed, 7.5 g
- 泽泻 Alisma orientale or A. plantago-aquatica rhizome, 7.5 g
- 五灵脂 Trogopterus xanthipes feces, 7.5 g
- 蚕沙 moth caterpillar feces, 16.2 g
- 牡丹皮 Paeonia suffruticosa root bark, 7.5 g
- 没药 myrrh "mo-yao", 7.5 g

In traditional Chinese medicine language, its functionality is described as the following by the Pharmacopoeia:

祛风除湿，活血止痛。用于风寒湿痹，手足麻木，腰腿酸痛；跌扑损伤，瘀滞肿痛。
Dispel wind and eliminate dampness, activate blood and stop pain. Used for wind-cold-dampness impediment, numbness in hands and feet, soreness and pain in waist and legs; for fall and impact injuries, stasis, swelling and pain.

Amounts are given for oral and topical use.

This medicated liquor dates to the 17th century. It is listed in Guangdong's provincial list of intangible cultural heritages.

=== Traditional ingredients ===
Traditional recipes may include:

- baji tian (morinda root)
- baibu (stemona)
- baidou kou (white cardamom)
- baihuashe (pit viper)
- baiji zi (mustard seed)
- baishao (white peony root, Paeonia lactiflora)
- baizhi (white angelica root)
- banxia (Pinellia root)
- cangzhu (red Atractylodes root)
- caowu (Aconitum kusnezoffii root – a wild member of the large aconitum genus)
- cheqian zi (Plantago seed)
- chenpi (aged tangerine peel)
- chenxiang (Aquilaria wood)
- chishao (Paeonia lactiflora root, red peony)
- chuanpo shi (Maclura tricuspidata)
- chuanshan long (Dioscorea polystachya, Chinese yam)
- chuanwu (Aconitum carmichaelii root, Sichuan aconite)
- chuanxiong (Szechuan lovage root)
- dahuang (rhubarb root)
- danshen (Chinese salvia root)
- danggui (Chinese angelica root)
- danggui wei (Chinese angelica root tail)
- digupi (Chinese wolfberry bark)
- dingxiang (clove bud)
- duhuo (Angelica pubescens root)
- duzhong (Eucommia bark)
- ezhu (Curcuma zedoaria root)
- fangfeng (siler root)
- fuhai shi (pumice)
- fuling (perenniporia mushroom)
- fupen zi (raspberry fruit)
- fuzi (Aconitum root)
- gancao (Glycyrrhiza uralensis, licorice root)
- ganjiang (ginger rhizome)
- gaoliang jiang (galangal rhizome)
- gegen (kudzu root)
- gouqi zi (goji berry)
- gusuibu (Drynaria rhizome)
- gualouren (Trichosanthes seed)
- guizhi (cinnamon twig)
- haifeng teng (kadsura stem)
- hong hua (Carthamus/safflower flower)
- hua jiao (prickly ash pepper or sichuan pepper(?))
- huang bai (phellodendron bark)
- huang qin (Baikal skullcap root)
- ji xue teng (Millettia vine)
- jiang huang (turmeric rhizome)
- jiang xiang (dalbergia rosewood heartwood)
- jie geng (Platycodon root)
- jing jie (Schizonepeta aerial parts)
- kuan jin teng (Tinospora cordifolia stem)
- li lu (veratrum)
- liu huang (sulfur)
- liu ji nu (Artemisia anomala)
- long gu (dragon bone, fossilized mammal bones)
- lu lu tong (liquidambar fruit)
- luo shi teng (star jasmine vine)
- ma huang (ephedra stem)
- menthol
- mo yao (myrrh)
- mu dan pi (moutan peony root cortex)
- mu gua (quince fruit)
- mu tong (Akebia root)
- mu xiang (Saussurea costus root)
- niu xi (Achyranthes root)
- pu gong ying (dandelion)
- pu huang (cattail pollen)
- qian nian jian (homalomena)
- qiang huo (Hansenia weberbaueriana, syn. Notopterygium incisum)
- qin jiao (gentian root)
- qing pi (immature citrus peel)
- rou cong rong (Cistanche root)
- rou gui (cinnamon bark)
- ru xiang (frankincense)
- san leng (Sparganium rhizome)
- san qi (Panax pseudoginseng root, notoginseng)
- shan zhu yu dogwood berry)
- she chuang zi (Cnidium seed)
- sheng di huang (Rehmannia root)
- shu di huang (wine-cooked Rehmannia root)
- song jie (pine node)
- su mu (Caesalpinia sappan wood)
- tao ren (peach kernel)
- tian ma (Gastrodia rhizome)
- tian nan xing (Arisaema rhizome)
- tubie chong (Eupolyphaga sinensis, cockroach)
- tu si zi (Chinese dodder seed)
- wei ling xian (clematis root)
- wu jia pi (Siberian ginseng root cortex)
- wu ling zhi (flying squirrel feces)
- wu wei zi (magnolia vine fruit)
- wu zhu yu (Euodia fruit)
- xi xin (asarum aerial parts)
- xiang fu ('Cyperus rhizome)
- xu duan (Dipsacus root)
- xue jie (dragon's blood resin)
- yan hu suo (Corydalis rhizome)
- yu jin (turmeric tuber)
- ze lan (Lycopus lucidus aerial parts)
- zhang nao (camphor)
- zhi ke (bitter orange fruit)
- zi ran tong (pyrite)
- zi su ye (perilla leaf)
- zi wan (Callistephus root)

=== Westernized recipe ingredients ===
Some recipes instead use ingredients more readily available, such as:

- Arnica blossoms
- Blessed thistle
- Cinnamon bark
- Comfrey
- Ginger root
- Goldenseal root
- Myrrh
- Pseudoginseng
- Rhubarb root
- Sarsaparilla root
- Witch-hazel
- Eucalyptus oil
- Rosemary oil
- Boswellia carteri
- Boswellia serrata

== Analytics ==
Detailed information on the bioactive components of dit da jow is limited, with formulations varying widely. One report stated the components vary considerably with brand and age, but those found included acetic acid, acetoglyceride, columbianetin, coumarin, rhododendrol, vanillin, chrysophanic acid, and salicylic acid.
