= Zheng Gu Shui =

Chinese liniment

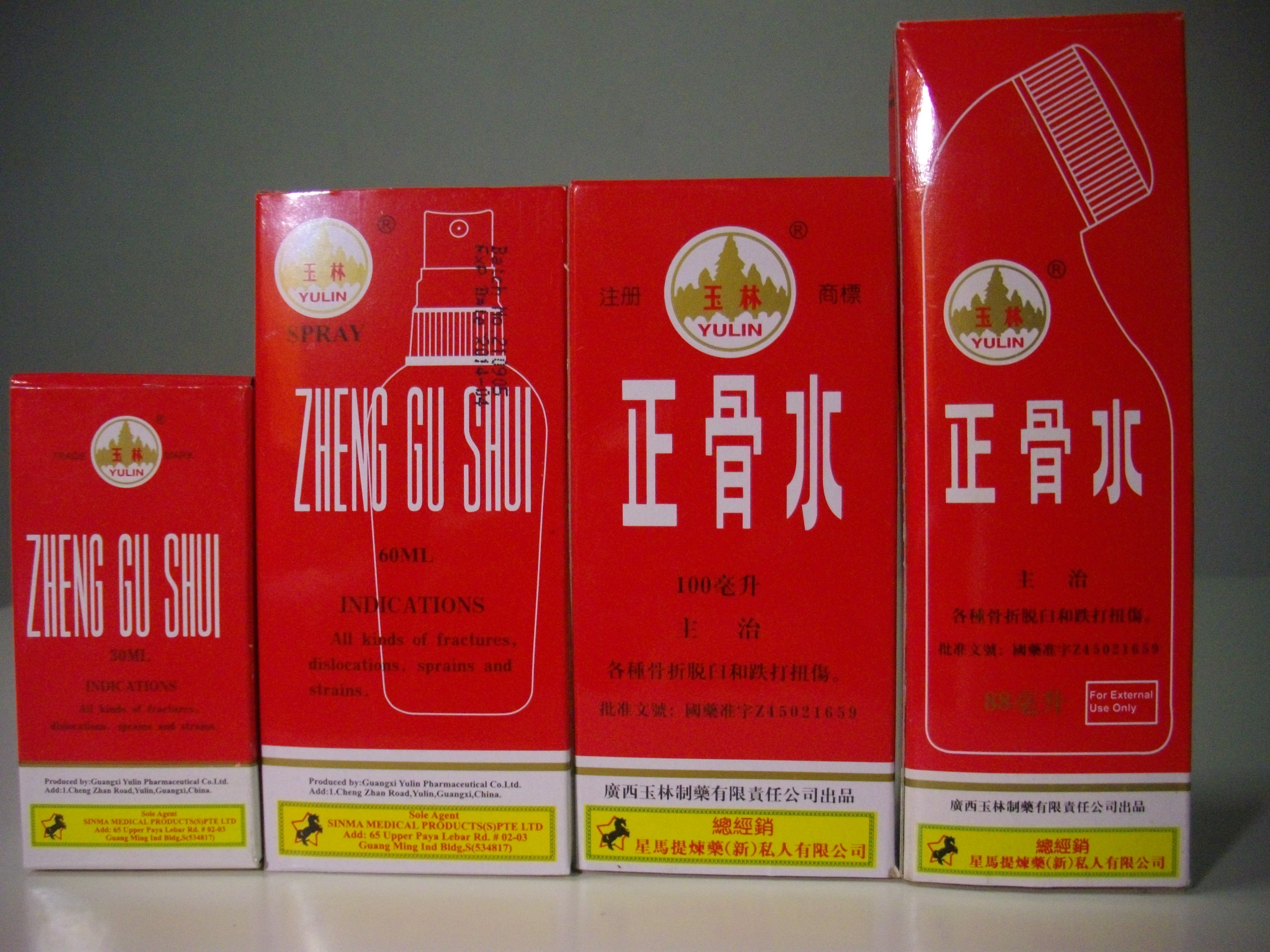
Zheng Gu Shui (for export)

Zheng Gu Shui (Chinese: 正骨水; lit. 'bone-setting liquid') is a traditional Chinese liniment. This external analgesic is believed to relieve qi and blood stagnation, promote healing, and soothe pain. The formula falls into the category of dit da jow in Cantonese or die da jiu in Mandarin.

The liniment was used to treat fractures, broken bones and injuries suffered in combat. It is used today by practitioners of Chinese medicine to treat pain or trauma from backache, arthritis, strains, bruises, and sprains. It should neither be used on open wounds nor swallowed.

Zheng Gu Shui is also used by people who suffer from achy feet from long-time standing or people who suffer from Plantar Fasciitis by applying with a cotton ball and letting air dry before putting on socks and shoes. Due to its nature, it can stain clothing if not dried properly. Stains generally can be removed with a small amount of alcohol.

== Contents ==
=== Fratkin formula ===
The ingredients in Fratkin's formula for Zheng Gu Shui are listed as follows (percentages are exact):

- Pseudoginseng 25%
- Croton seed 18%
- Cinnamon bark 13%
- Angelica root 13%
- Gentiana 12%
- Inula flower 12%
- Menthol crystal 3%
- Camphor crystal 2%

Alcohol is the base liquid to pull out the alkaloidal constituents.

=== Export formula ===
The export form obtained via Solstice, bearing the Yulin 玉林 trademark, lists as active ingredients:

- Camphor 5.6%,
- Menthol 5.6%.

And as inactive ingredients:

- Alcohol,
- Japanese knotweed (Polygonum cuspidatum Siebold & Zucc.) rhizome,
- paniculate swallowwort [Pycnostelma paniculatum (Bge.) K. Schum.] root,
- shin-leaf prickly ash [Zanthoxylum nitidum (Roxb.) DC.] root,
- water,
- zedoary rhizome.

Note: Curcuma phaeocaulis, which is used in the Pharmacopoeia form below, is known to have been misattributed as zedoary (Curcuma zedoaria) in the past.

=== Chinese Pharmacopoeia formula ===
- 九龙川†
- 木香 Aucklandia lappa root
- 海风藤 Piper kadsura vine/stem
- 土鳖虫 Eupolyphaga sinensis or Steleophaga plancyi, whole females
- 豆豉姜†
- 猪牙皂 Gleditsia sinensis infertile fruits
- 香加皮 Periploca sepium root bark
- 莪术 Curcuma phaeocaulis, C. kwangsiensis, or C. wenyujin rhizome
- 买麻藤†
- 过江龙†
- 香樟†
- 徐长卿 Cynanchum paniculatum root and rhizome
- 降香 Dalbergia odorifera trunk and root heartwood
- 两面针 Zanthoxylum nitidum root
- 碎骨木†
- 羊耳菊†
- 虎杖 Polygonum cuspidatum root and rhizome
- 五味藤†
- 千斤拔†
- 朱砂根 Ardisia crenata root
- 横经席†
- 穿壁风†
- 鹰不扑†
- 草乌 Aconitum kusnezoffii root tuber
- 薄荷脑 Menthol
- 樟脑 Camphor

† = Monograph for material not found in 2020 Edition of the Chinese Pharmacopoeia

The 2020 Edition of the Chinese Pharmacopoeia calls for an alcoholic extraction of the 26 above materials. The ratio is not specified, which is customary for formulas involving "state secret technology".

The function and purpose of the formula according to the Chinese Pharmacopoeia is:

活血祛瘀，舒筋活络，消肿止痛。用于跌打扭伤，骨折脱位以及体育运动前后消除疲劳。
Activates blood circulation and removes stasis, relaxes tendons and activates collaterals, reduces swelling and relieves pain. Used for sprains and contusions, fractures and dislocations, as well as eliminating fatigue before and after physical exercise.

== History ==
The formula found in Chinese Pharmacopoeia was contributed by Chen Shanwen, an ex-Kuomintang military doctor of Major rank. He learned a bone-healing formula from his grandfather and specialized in TCM thereafter, creating a locally-famous Bo Gu Shui (Chinese: 驳骨水; lit. 'bone-grafting liquid'). He remained in China when the People's Republic was founded. He was given a post as a technician at Yulin Xinsheng Pharmaceutical Plant (later Yulin Pharmaceutical Plant) and worked his way up to become the vice director. During his time at the plant, he worked to reformulate Bo Gu Shui into a form suitable for mass-production, creating the modern Chinese Zheng Gu Shui.

== Bibliography ==
- Clinical Handbook of Chinese Prepared Medicines by Chun-Han Zhu
- Chinese Herbal Patent Formulas by Jake Fratkin
- Traditional Chinese Medicine and the Athlete by Nicolas Miller
- Oriental Materia Medica: A Concise Guide by Hong-Yen Hsu
- Zheng Gu Shui's founding origins (Written in Mandarin Chinese)
