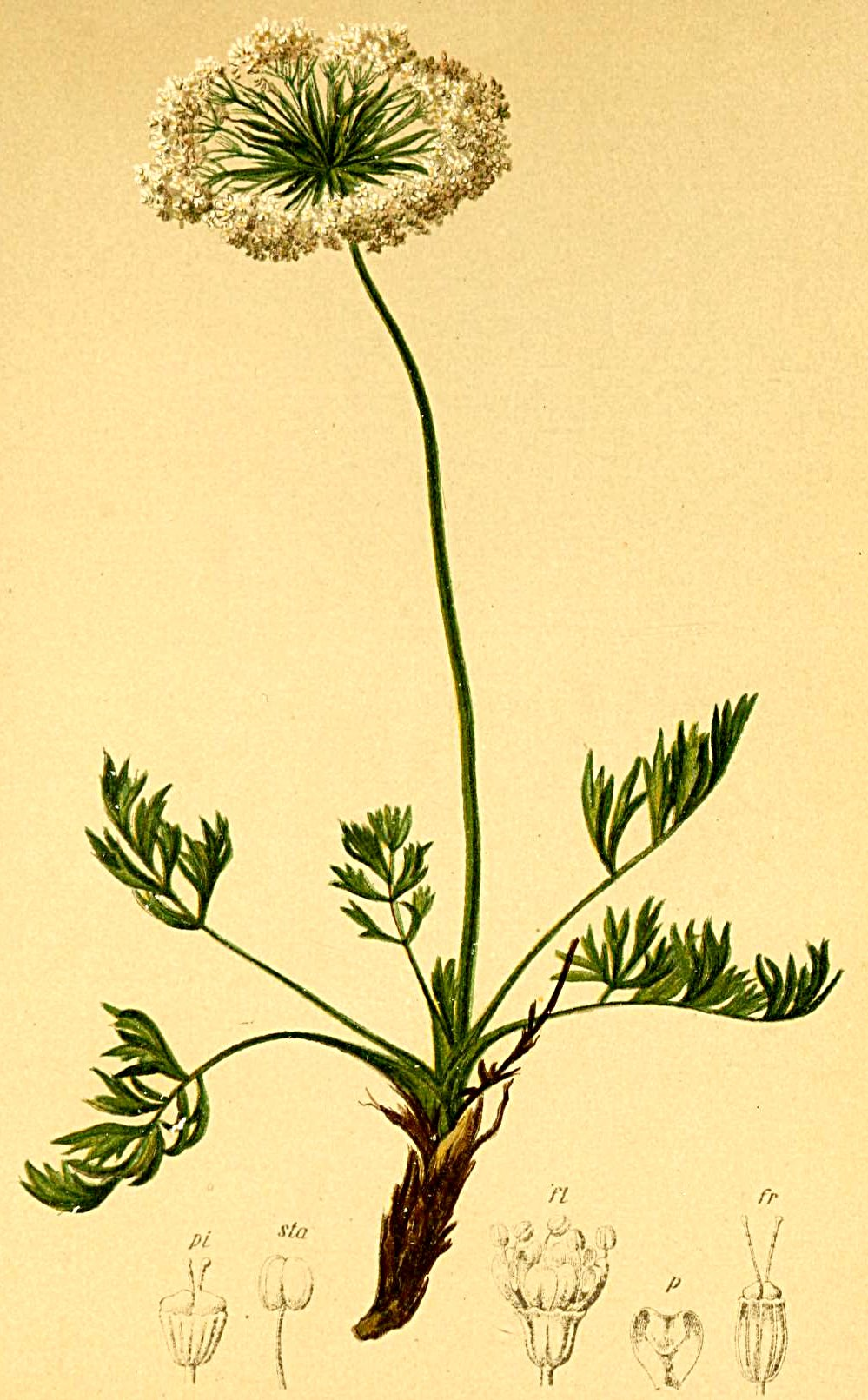

Scientific classification
- Kingdom: Plantae
- Clade: Tracheophytes
- Clade: Angiosperms
- Clade: Eudicots
- Clade: Asterids
- Order: Apiales
- Family: Apiaceae
- Subfamily: Apioideae
- Genus: Pachypleurum; Ledeb.

= Pachypleurum =

Genus of plants

Pachypleurum is a genus of flowering plants belonging to the family Apiaceae.

Its native range is Tibet to Southern Central China.

Species:

- Pachypleurum muliense R.H.Shan & F.T.Pu
- Pachypleurum nyalamense H.T.Chang & R.H.Shan
