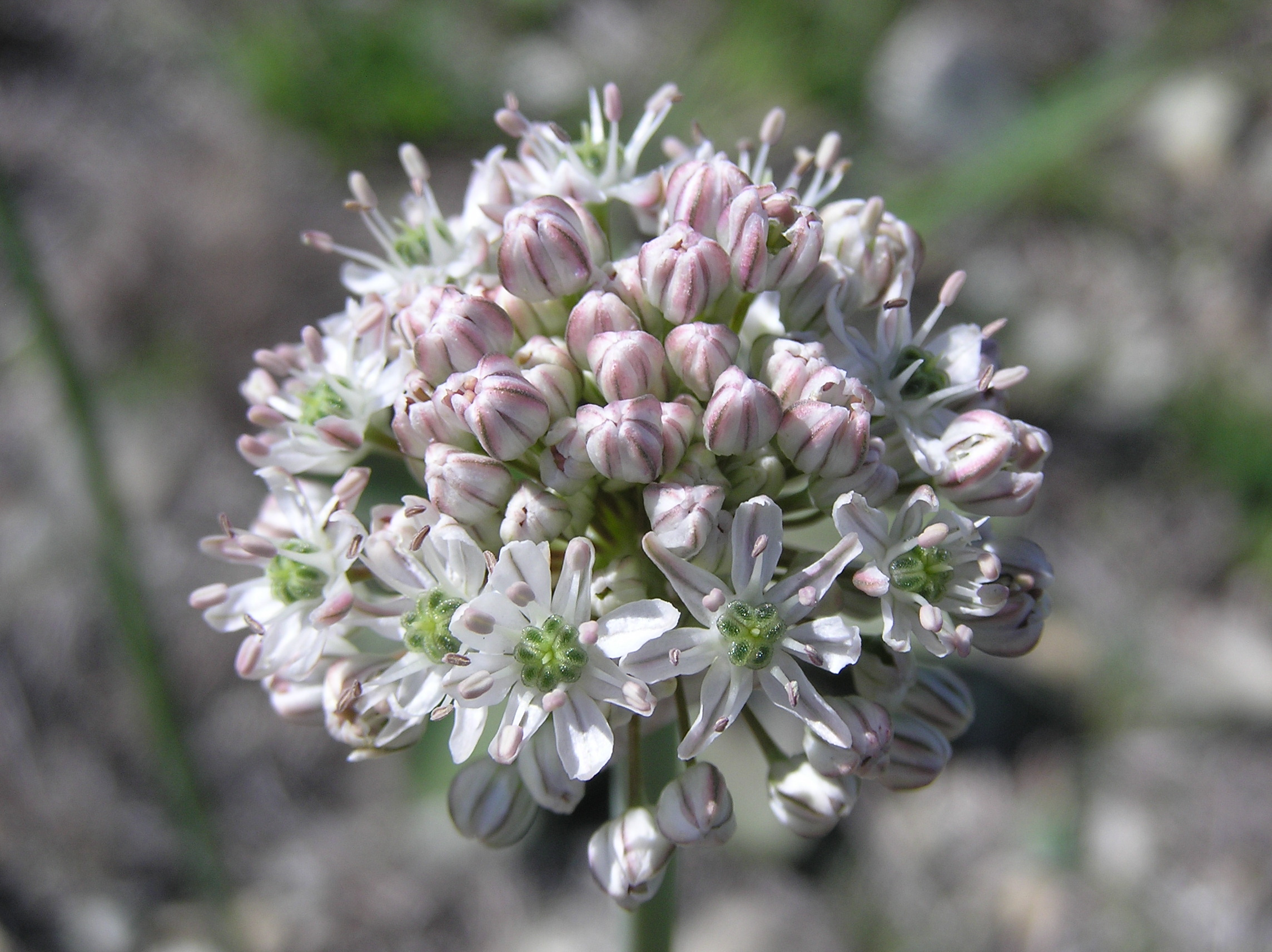

Scientific classification
- Kingdom: Plantae
- Clade: Tracheophytes
- Clade: Angiosperms
- Clade: Monocots
- Order: Asparagales
- Family: Amaryllidaceae
- Subfamily: Allioideae
- Genus: Allium
- Subgenus: Allium subg. Melanocrommyum
- Species: A. tulipifolium

Binomial name
- Allium tulipifolium Ledeb.

Synonyms
- Synonymy: Allium lallemantii Regel & Rach; Allium subalpinum Pall. ex Kunth; Allium tulipifolium var. brachystemon Regel; Allium tulipifolium var. subscabrum Regel

= Allium tulipifolium =

Лук тюльпанолистный 郁金叶蒜 yu jin ye suan

Species of flowering plant

Allium tulipifolium is an Asian species of wild onion native to Xinjiang, Kazakhstan and Altay Krai. It is found at elevations of 600–1000 m.

Allium tulipifolium has round to egg-shaped bulbs up to 20 mm in diameter. Scape is up to 40 cm tall, round in cross-section. Leaves are flat, waxy, up to 2 cm across, much shorter than scape, with a pink or dark green margin. Umbel has many flowers, the tepals white with dark green or purple mid-veins.
