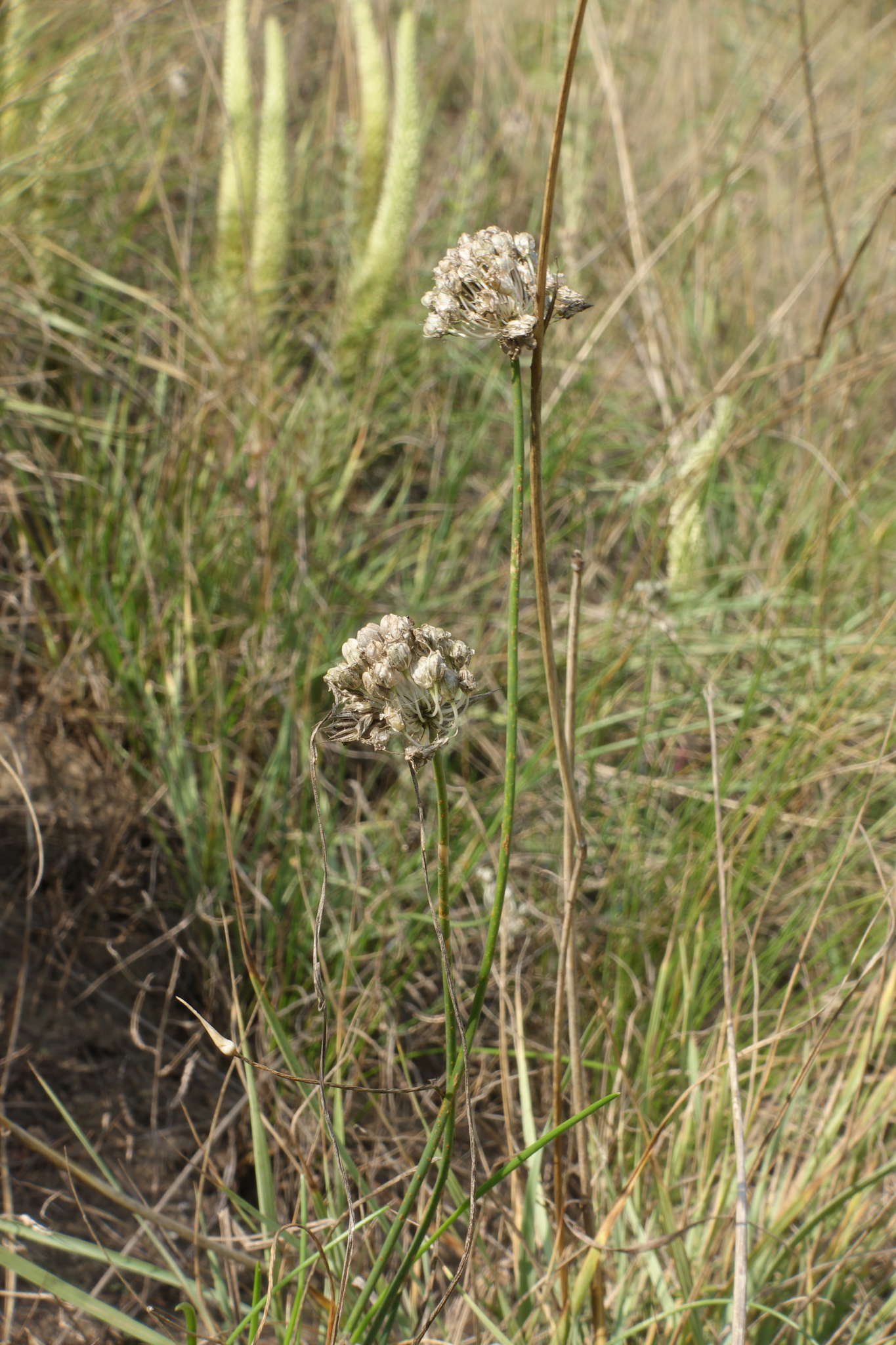

Scientific classification
- Kingdom: Plantae
- Clade: Tracheophytes
- Clade: Angiosperms
- Clade: Monocots
- Order: Asparagales
- Family: Amaryllidaceae
- Subfamily: Allioideae
- Genus: Allium
- Subgenus: A. subg. Reticulatobulbosa
- Species: A. clathratum

Binomial name
- Allium clathratum Ledeb.

= Allium clathratum =

Species of flowering plant

Allium clathratum is a species of onions native to temperate Asia (Xinjiang, Kazakhstan, Mongolia, and Siberia (Tuva, Krasnoyarsk, Western Siberia, and Altay Krai)). It grows on dry slopes and cliff faces at elevations of 400–2000 m.

Allium clathratum produces narrow bulbs rarely more than 10m mm wide. Umbel is hemispheric, with many pink flowers.
