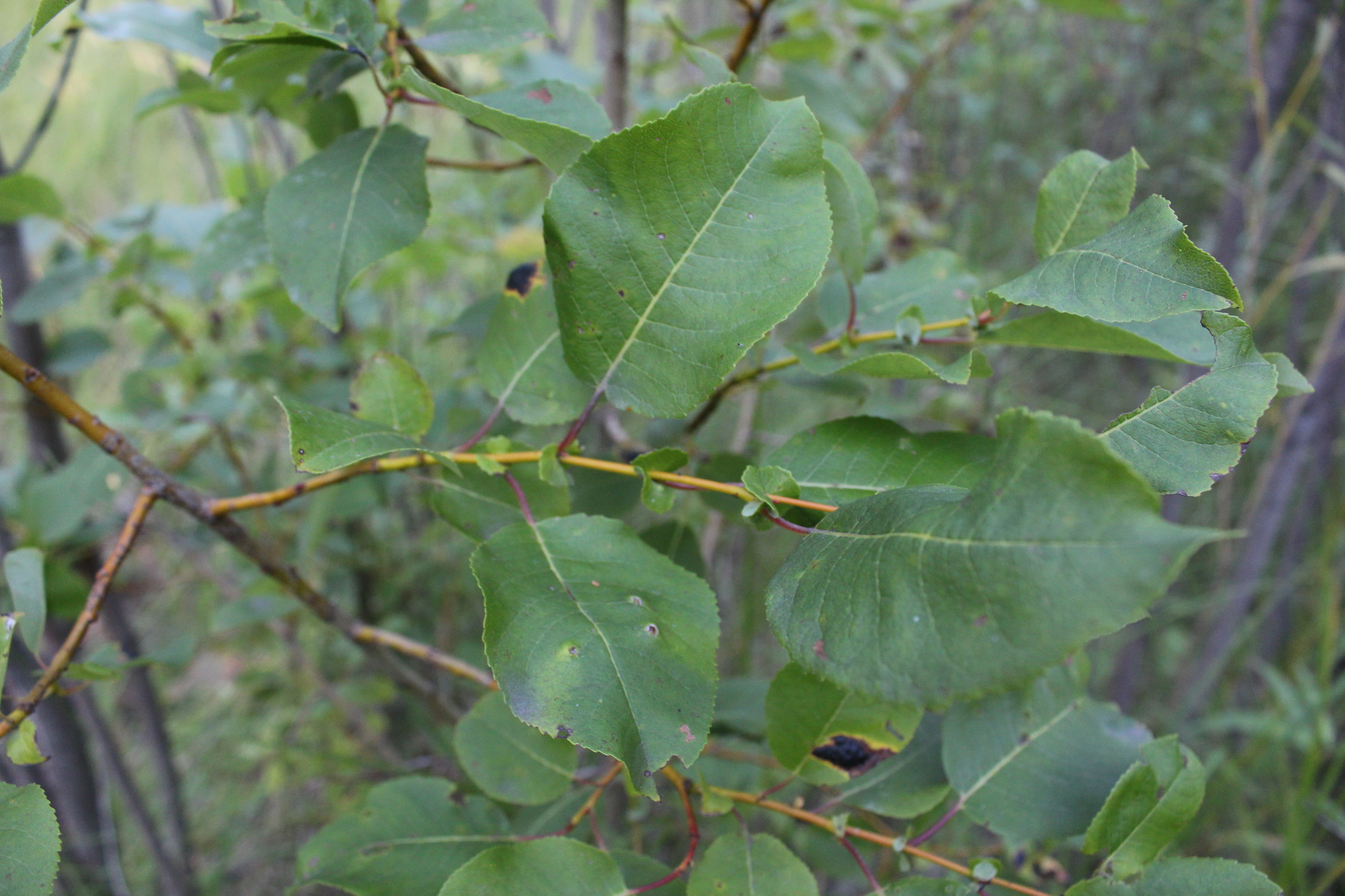
- Foliage

Conservation status
- Least Concern (IUCN 3.1)

Scientific classification
- Kingdom: Plantae
- Clade: Tracheophytes
- Clade: Angiosperms
- Clade: Eudicots
- Clade: Rosids
- Order: Malpighiales
- Family: Salicaceae
- Genus: Salix
- Species: S. pyrolifolia

Binomial name
- Salix pyrolifolia Ledeb.

Synonyms
- List: Salix alnoides Schangin ex Siev.; Salix corylifolia Turcz.; Salix pyrolifolia var. cordata Ledeb.; Salix pyrolifolia var. orbiculata Ledeb.; Salix pyrolifolia var. ovata Ledeb.; Salix pyrolifolia var. pubescens Nasarow; Salix sabulosa Turcz.; Salix subpyroliformis Y.L.Chang & Skvortsov

= Salix pyrolifolia =

Species of plant

Salix pyrolifolia, the pyrola-leaved willow, is a species of flowering plant in the family Salicaceae. It is native to northern Finland, northern and eastern Russia, Siberia, the Russian Far East, Kazakhstan, Kyrgyzstan, Mongolia, and northern China. A large shrub or small tree, it is typically found on riversides and forest edges.
