= Allium flavidum =

新疆韭 xin jiang jiu

Scientific classification
- Kingdom: Plantae
- Clade: Tracheophytes
- Clade: Angiosperms
- Clade: Monocots
- Order: Asparagales
- Family: Amaryllidaceae
- Subfamily: Allioideae
- Genus: Allium
- Subgenus: A. subg. Reticulatobulbosa
- Species: A. flavidum

Binomial name
- Allium flavidum Ledeb.

Synonyms
- Allium stellerianum Ledeb. 1852, illegitimate homonym not Willd. 1799 nor Besser 1816

Species of flowering plant

Allium flavidum is an Asian species of onions native to Xinjiang, Altay Krai, Mongolia and Kazakhstan. It grows in rocky areas.

Allium flavidum has narrow bulbs up to 1 cm in diameter. Scapes are up to 45 cm long, round in cross-section. Leaves are very narrow, shorter than the scape. Umbel is large and spherical with many white or pale yellow flowers.
