= Astragalus xanthotrichos =

Scientific classification
- Kingdom: Plantae
- Clade: Tracheophytes
- Clade: Angiosperms
- Clade: Eudicots
- Clade: Rosids
- Order: Fabales
- Family: Fabaceae
- Subfamily: Faboideae
- Genus: Astragalus
- Species: A. xanthotrichos

Binomial name
- Astragalus xanthotrichos Ledeb.

Synonyms
- Tragacantha xanthotrichos (Ledeb.) Kuntze

Species of flowering plant

Astragalus xanthotrichos is a species of flowering plant in the family Fabaceae.

Astragalus xanthotrichos is native to the temperate biome of eastern Kazakhstan and Mongolia. It was named by Carl Friedrich von Ledebour in 1831.

== Description ==
Astragalus xanthotrichos is a rare perennial shrub with yellow flowers.

The plants are 20–50 centimetres (0.66–1.64 ft) tall, and have small white hairs. The leaves are 3–7 centimetres (1.2–2.8 in) long, and the leaf stalk is 0.7–1.2 centimetres (0.28–0.47 in) long. The plant has leaflets in three or four pairs. The leaflets are 1–3.5 centimetres (0.39–1.38 in) long, and 0.4–1 centimetre (0.16–0.39 in).

The calyx is tube shaped, and has white hairs. Pollen is presented when the calyx is around 1.2 centimetres (0.47 in) in size. When the plant is fruiting, the calyx is egg-shaped, and 1.5–1.8 centimetres (0.59–0.71 in) in size.
