= Allium amphibolum =

直立韭 zhi li jiu

Scientific classification
- Kingdom: Plantae
- Clade: Tracheophytes
- Clade: Angiosperms
- Clade: Monocots
- Order: Asparagales
- Family: Amaryllidaceae
- Subfamily: Allioideae
- Genus: Allium
- Subgenus: A. subg. Reticulatobulbosa
- Species: A. amphibolum

Binomial name
- Allium amphibolum Ledeb.

Species of flowering plant

Allium amphibolum is a species of onion native to Altai, Tuva, Kazakhstan, Mongolia, and the Province of Xinjiang in western China.

Allium amphibolum produces a clump of narrow bulbs up to 15 mm in diameter. Scapes are up to 30 cm tall. Leaves narrow, up to 15 cm long but rarely more than 5 mm across. Tepals are rose or lilac, with darker red midveins. Ovary is round with a very long style.
