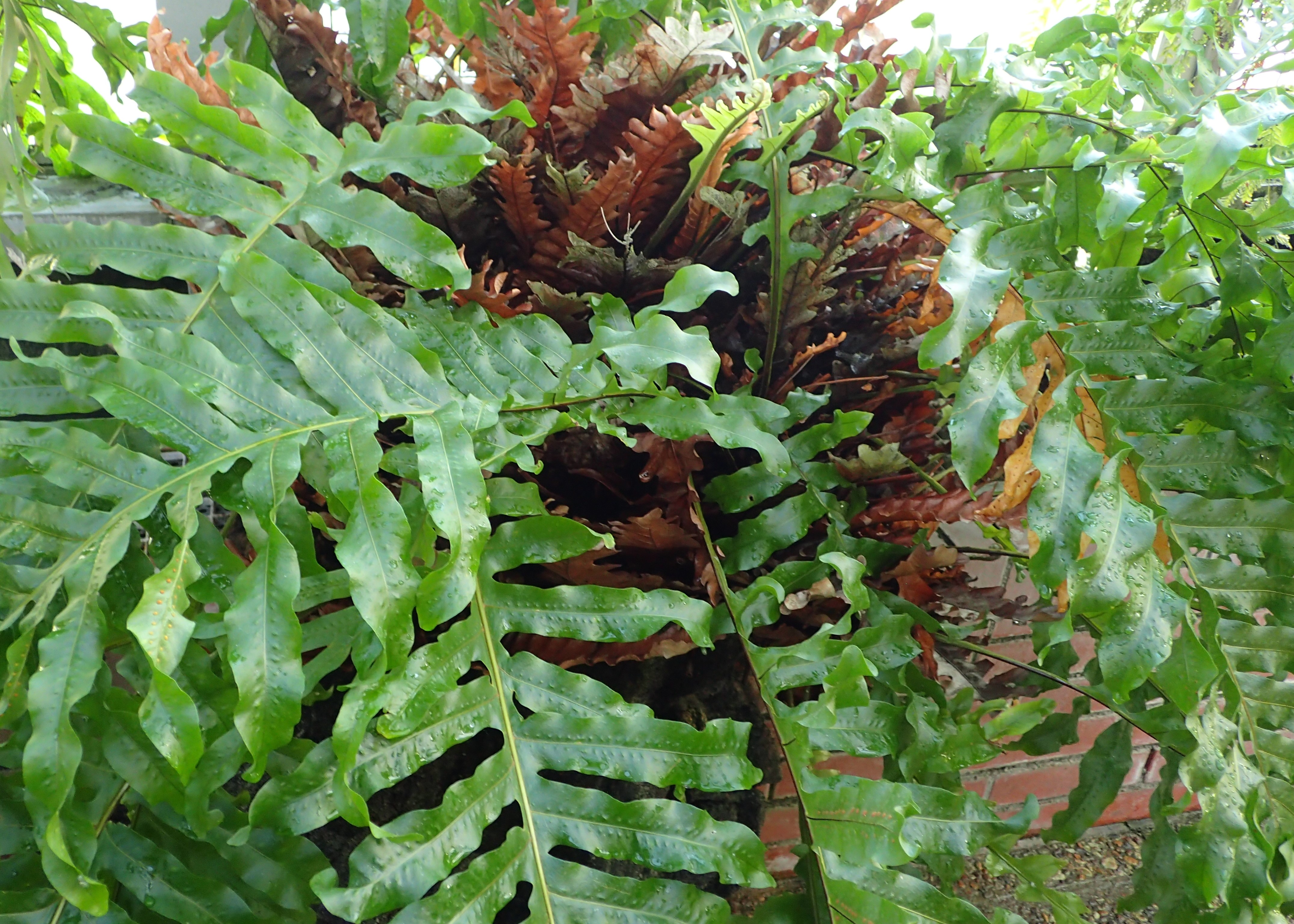
- Drynaria willdenowii growing in the Berlin Botanical Garden

Scientific classification
- Kingdom: Plantae
- Clade: Tracheophytes
- Division: Polypodiophyta
- Class: Polypodiopsida
- Order: Polypodiales
- Suborder: Polypodiineae
- Family: Polypodiaceae
- Genus: Drynaria
- Species: D. willdenowii

Binomial name
- Drynaria willdenowii (Bory) T.Moore

Synonyms
- Algaomorpha willdenowii; Phymatodes thouarsii; Polypodium thouarsii; Polypodium willdenowii

= Drynaria willdenowii =

Species of plant

Drynaria willdenowii is a species of subtropical fern native to the islands of Comoros, Madagascar, and Mauritius. Drynarioid ferns are largely native to Asia and Oceania, but D. willdenowii is the only species of fern in the genus native to Madagascar. Like other Drynaria, its caudex is covered in dry, scale-like sterile fronds and fine hairs, while the larger green fronds are the fertile ones bearing spores.
