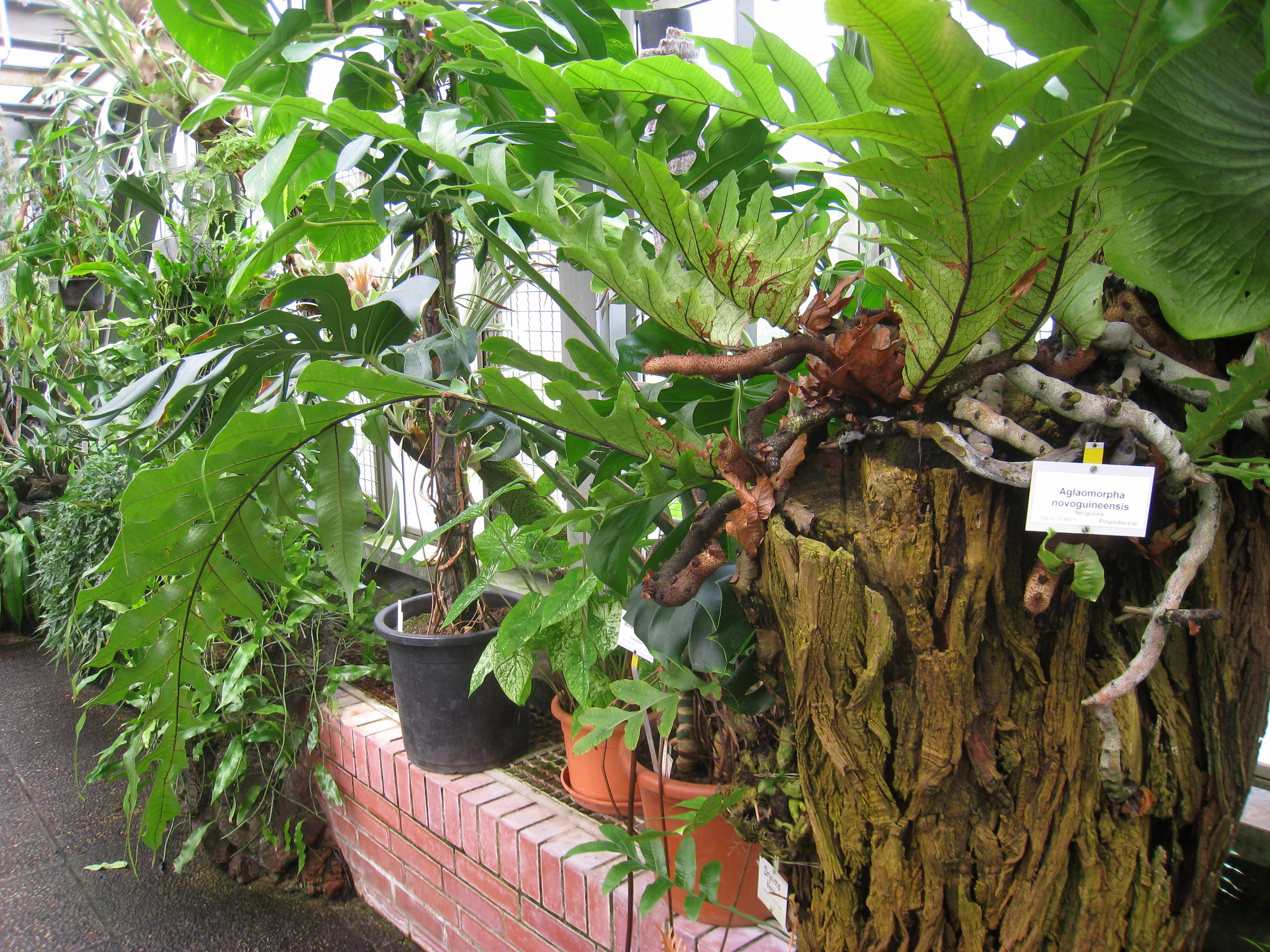

Scientific classification
- Kingdom: Plantae
- Clade: Tracheophytes
- Division: Polypodiophyta
- Class: Polypodiopsida
- Order: Polypodiales
- Suborder: Polypodiineae
- Family: Polypodiaceae
- Genus: Drynaria
- Species: D. novoguineensis

Binomial name
- Drynaria novoguineensis (Brause) Christenh.

= Drynaria novoguineensis =

Species of fern

Drynaria novoguineensis is a species of ferns in the family Polypodiaceae. It is native to New Guinea.
