= Hansenia =

Scientific classification
- Kingdom: Plantae
- Clade: Tracheophytes
- Clade: Angiosperms
- Clade: Eudicots
- Clade: Asterids
- Order: Apiales
- Family: Apiaceae
- Subfamily: Apioideae
- Genus: Hansenia; Turcz.

Species
- See text.

Synonyms
- Drymoscias Koso-Pol.; Haplosphaera Hand.-Mazz.; Notopterygium H.Boissieu

Genus of plants

Hansenia is a genus of flowering plant in the family Apiaceae, native to from Siberia to China. The genus was first described by Nikolai Turczaninow in 1844.

== Species ==
As of December 2022, Plants of the World Online accepted the following species:

- Hansenia forbesii (H.Boissieu) Pimenov & Kljuykov
- Hansenia forrestii (H.Wolff) Pimenov & Kljuykov
- Hansenia himalayensis (Ludlow) J.B.Tan & X.G.Ma
- Hansenia mongholica Turcz.
- Hansenia oviformis (R.H.Shan) Pimenov & Kljuykov
- Hansenia phaea (Hand.-Mazz.) J.B.Tan & X.G.Ma
- Hansenia weberbaueriana (Fedde ex H.Wolff) Pimenov & Kljuykov
