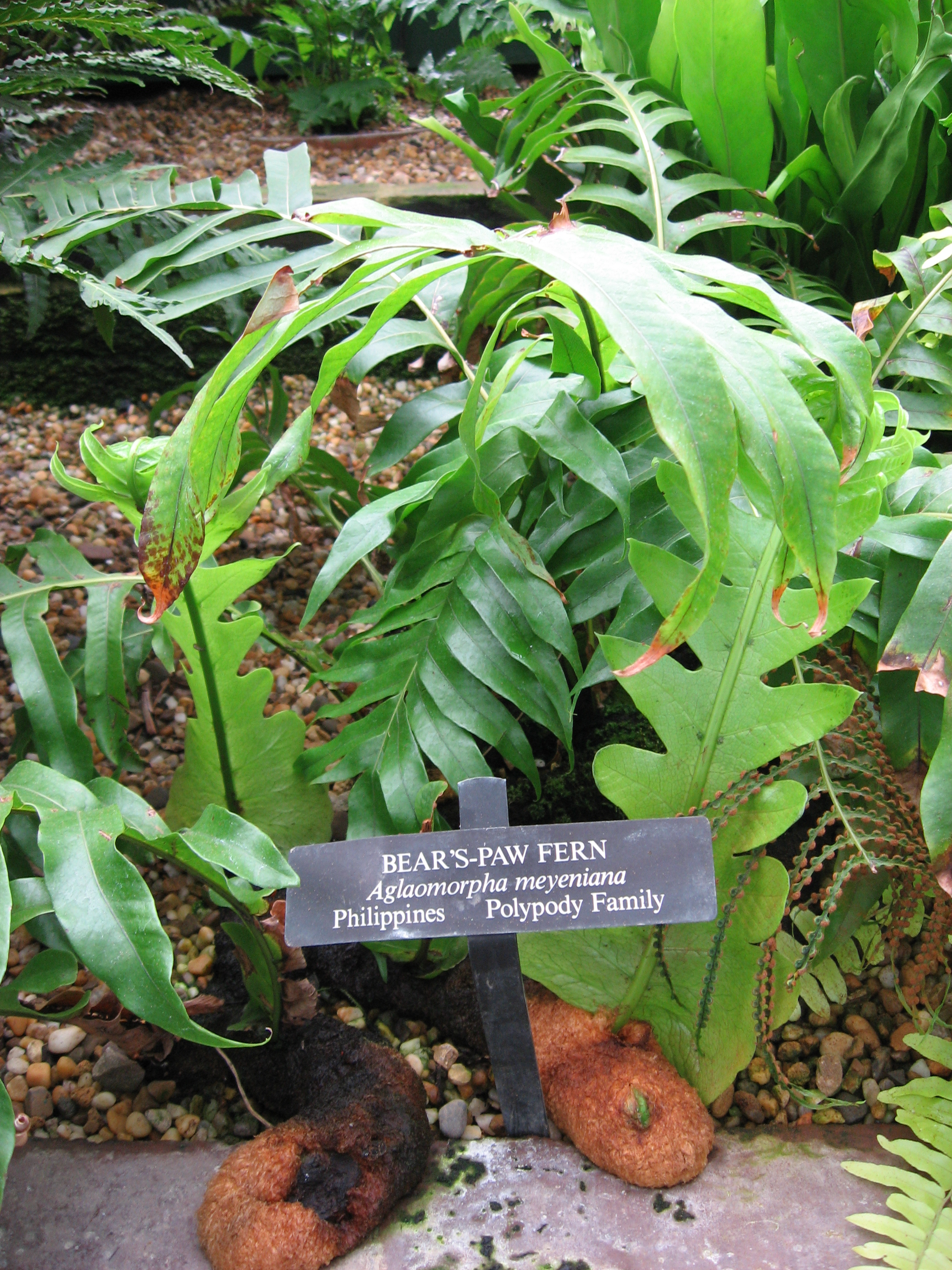

Scientific classification
- Kingdom: Plantae
- Clade: Tracheophytes
- Division: Polypodiophyta
- Class: Polypodiopsida
- Order: Polypodiales
- Suborder: Polypodiineae
- Family: Polypodiaceae
- Genus: Drynaria
- Species: D. meyeniana

Binomial name
- Drynaria meyeniana Schott (Christenh.)

= Drynaria meyeniana =

Species of fern

Drynariaa meyeniana is a species of plant in the family Polypodiaceae. It is native to the Philippines.
