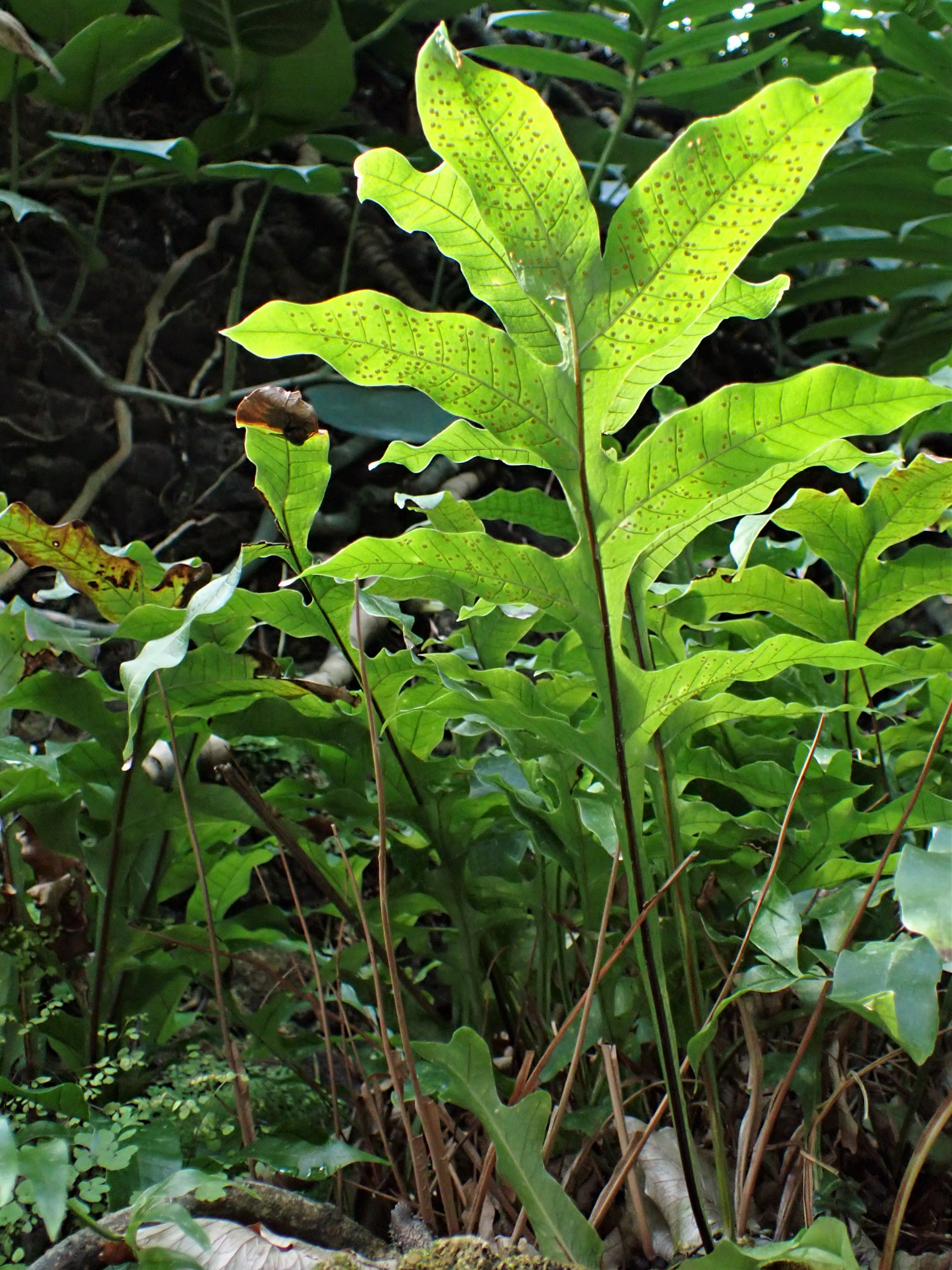
- Drynaria bonii growing in the Botanical Garden of the University of Halle-Wittenberg

Scientific classification
- Kingdom: Plantae
- Clade: Tracheophytes
- Division: Polypodiophyta
- Class: Polypodiopsida
- Order: Polypodiales
- Suborder: Polypodiineae
- Family: Polypodiaceae
- Genus: Drynaria
- Species: D. bonii

Binomial name
- Drynaria bonii Christ

Synonyms
- Drynaria bonii (Christ) Hovenkamp & S.Linds.

= Drynaria bonii =

Species of fern

Drynaria bonii is a species of subtropical fern native to Southeast Asia. Growing as an epiphyte or lithophyte, its rhizome is covered in dry, paper-like fronds while the larger fronds are fertile and bear spores. This fern has long been used in traditional medicine in Vietnam to treat a variety of ailments, and in scientific research, compounds from the plant have demonstrated antibacterial and antioxidant properties.
