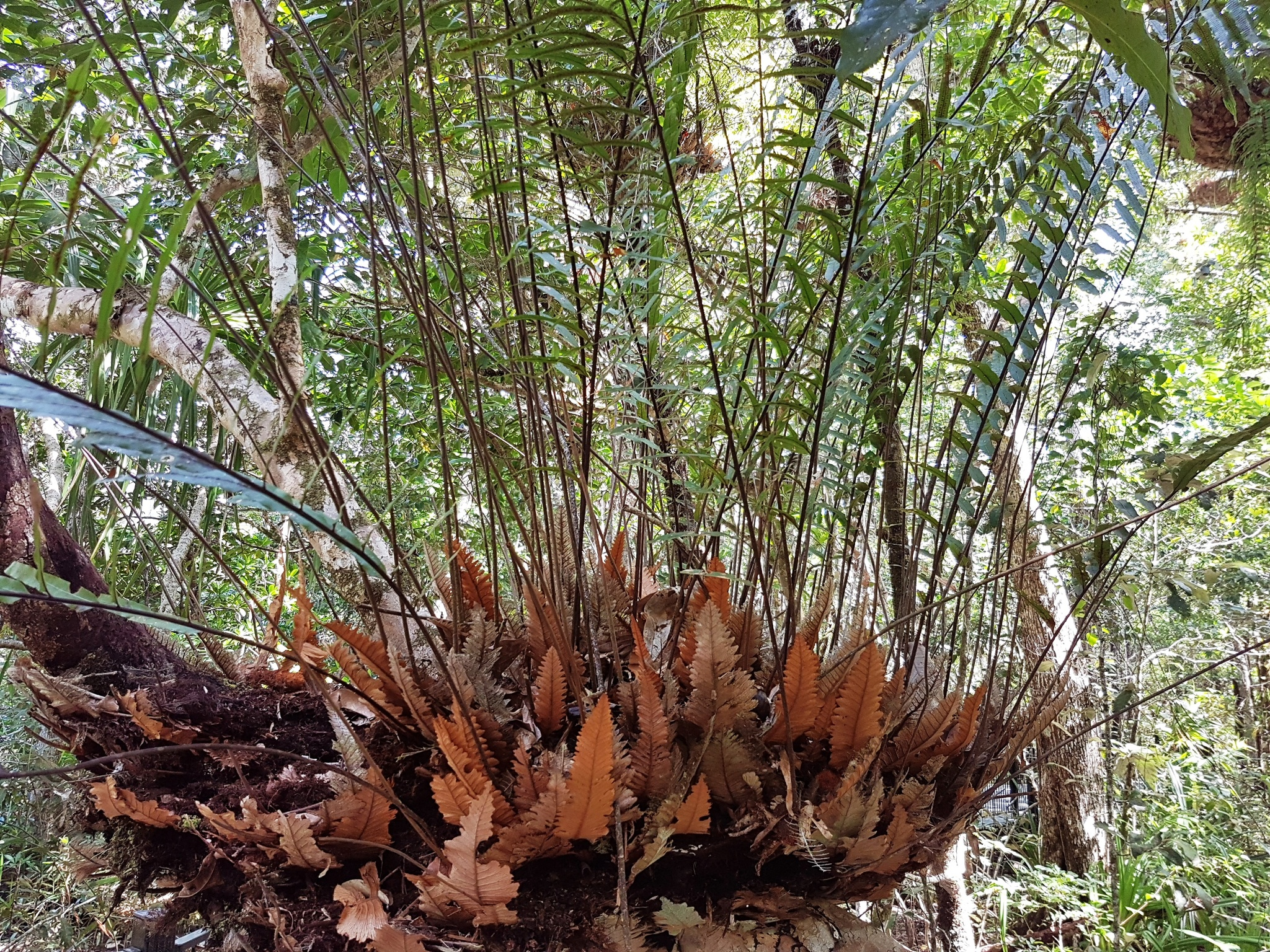
- D. rigidula growing in Queensland

Scientific classification
- Kingdom: Plantae
- Clade: Embryophytes
- Clade: Tracheophytes
- Division: Polypodiophyta
- Class: Polypodiopsida
- Order: Polypodiales
- Suborder: Polypodiineae
- Family: Polypodiaceae
- Genus: Drynaria
- Species: D. rigidula

Binomial name
- Drynaria rigidula (Sw.) Bedd.

Synonyms
- Aglaomorpha rigidula, Pseudodrynaria rigidula

= Drynaria rigidula =

Species of plant

Drynaria rigidula is a species of tropical fern in genus Drynaria widely distributed throughout Southeast Asia, from Southwest China to Queensland and New South Wales in Australia. Growing as an epiphyte or lithophyte, its green fronds are up to 1.22 metres (4 ft 0 in) in length. This fern develops two types of fronds, some of which near the base of the plant are shorter, sterile, and rust-colored which form a basket-like shape that trap moisture and organic components that nourish it. Especially in colder weather, this basket acts as prime habitat for animals such as the Australian scrub python.

The rhizomes of D. rigidula are sometimes used in traditional medicine as a folk remedy, and do have some antioxidant properties though valid medical application has yet to be found through pharmacological studies.
