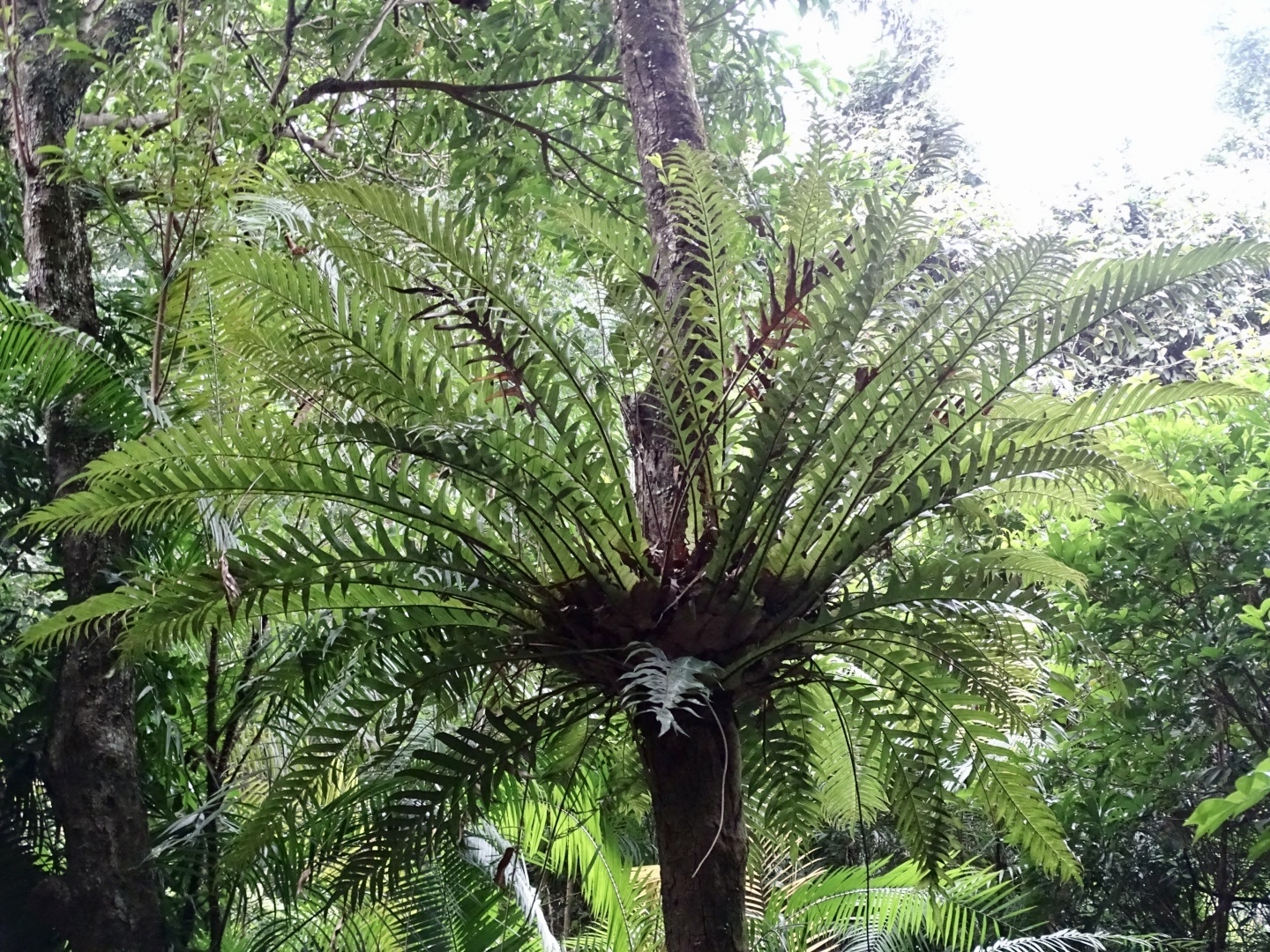
- Drynaria coronans growing in Ma On Shan Country Park

Scientific classification
- Kingdom: Plantae
- Clade: Tracheophytes
- Division: Polypodiophyta
- Class: Polypodiopsida
- Order: Polypodiales
- Suborder: Polypodiineae
- Family: Polypodiaceae
- Genus: Drynaria
- Species: D. coronans

Binomial name
- Drynaria coronans (Wall. ex Mett.) Copel.

Synonyms
- Aglaomorpha coronans, Pseudodrynaria coronans

= Drynaria coronans =

Species of plant

Drynaria coronans is a species of tropical fern widely distributed throughout Southeast Asia, from Nepal to Peninsular Malaysia. Like other Drynaria, it is an epiphyte and its scientific name (coronans) refers to the circular, crown-like growth habit. One of the species of basket fern more common in cultivation as a houseplant, it has as thick rhizome that soaks up moisture and fronds that are up to 1.8 metres (5 ft 11 in) long and 40 centimetres (16 in) wide.
