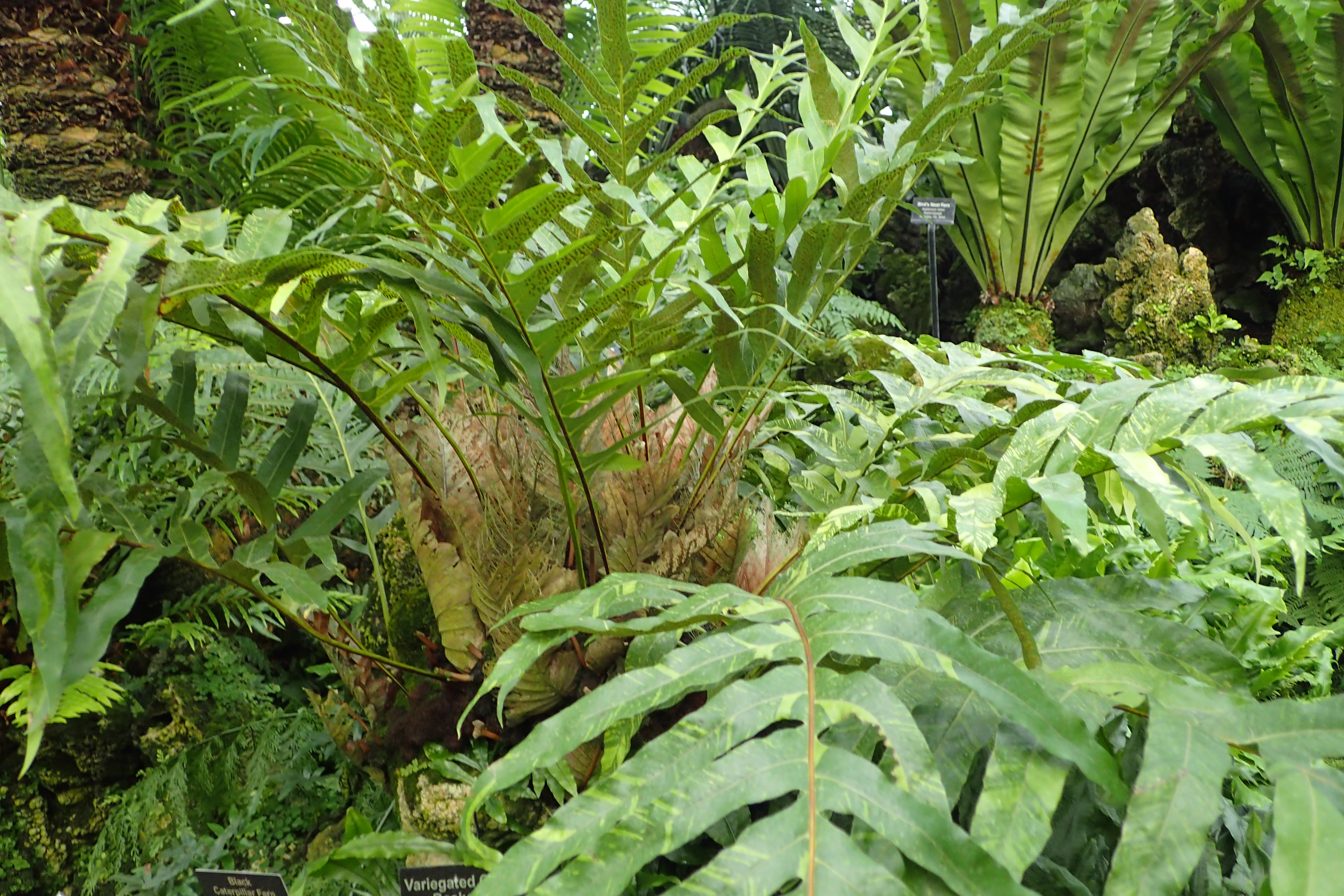
- Drynaria quercifolia at the Lincoln Park Conservatory

Scientific classification
- Kingdom: Plantae
- Clade: Tracheophytes
- Division: Polypodiophyta
- Class: Polypodiopsida
- Order: Polypodiales
- Suborder: Polypodiineae
- Family: Polypodiaceae
- Subfamily: Polypodioideae
- Tribe: Drynarieae
- Genus: Drynaria; J.Sm.

Species
- See text

Synonyms
- Aglaomorpha Schott; Christiopteris Copel.; Drynaria J.Sm.; Dryostachyum J.Sm.; Merinthosorus Copel.; Photinopteris J.Sm.; Pseudodrynaria C.Chr.; Thayeria Copel.

= Drynaria =

Drynaria Temporal range: Piacenzian to Present

Genus of ferns

Drynaria is a genus of ferns in the subfamily Drynarioideae of the family Polypodiaceae. The Pteridophyte Phylogeny Group classification of 2016 (PPG I) refers to it as Aglaomorpha, but that name was subsequently rejected in favor of Drynaria. Species are commonly known as basket ferns. As circumscribed in PPG I, the genus contains around 50 species.

Basket ferns are epiphytic or epipetric and are native to tropical Africa, South Asia, East Asia, Southeast Asia, Australia, and Oceania. Some species are economically important as medicinal plants.

== Description ==
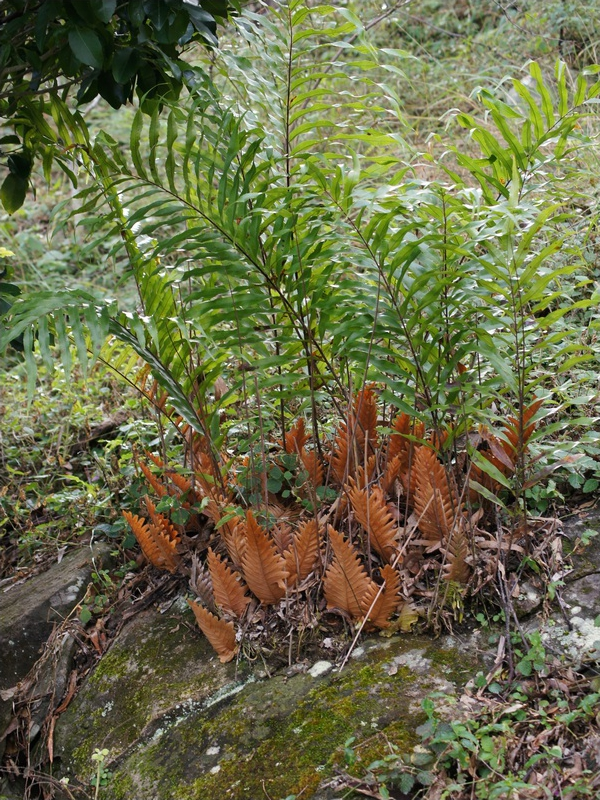
Drynaria rigidula growing on rocks in Australia. The fertile foliage fronds are large and dark green, the smaller brown sterile nest fronds are clustered at their bases.

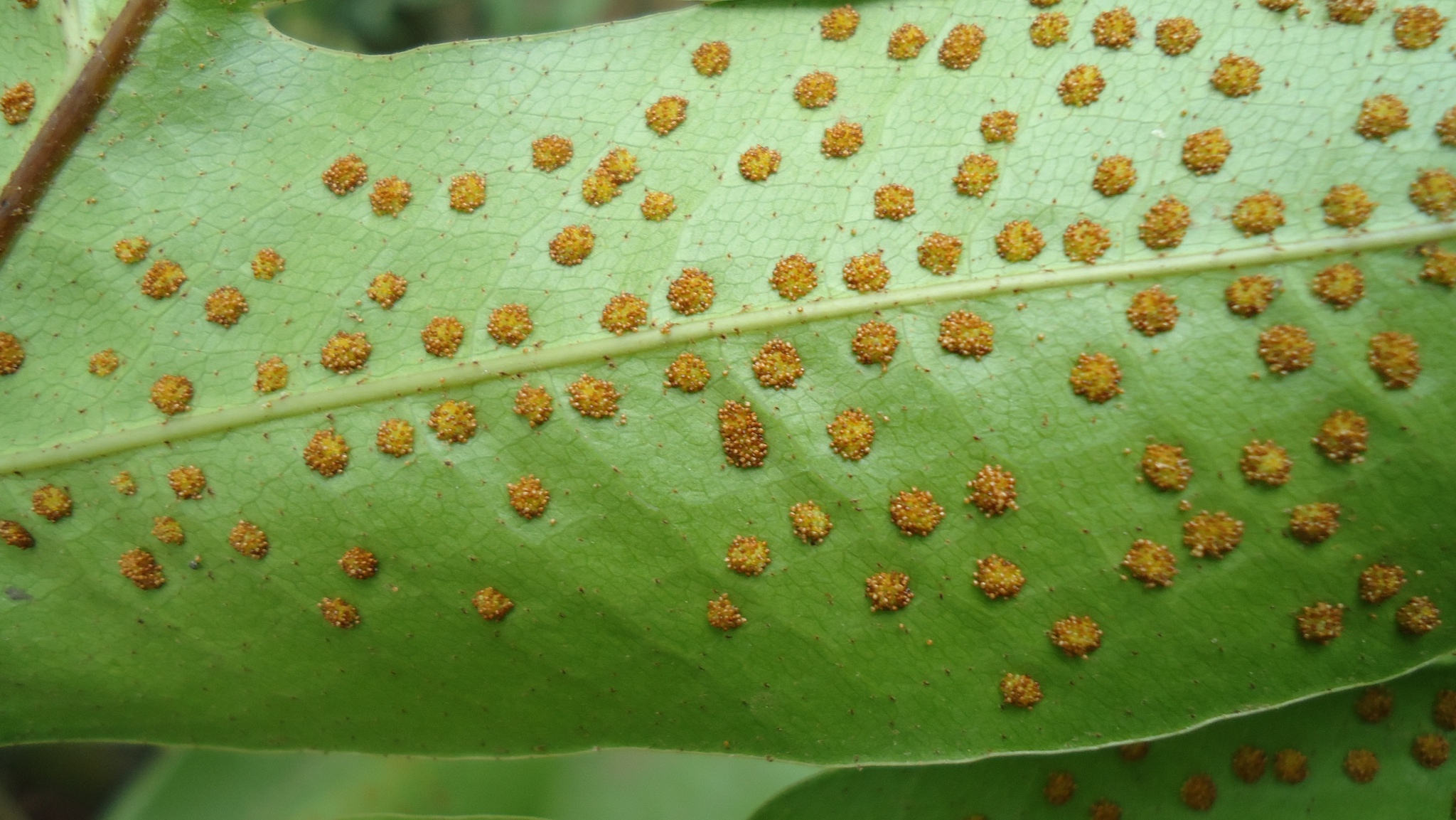
Sori on the abaxial surface of the foliage frond of Drynaria quercifolia.

Basket ferns are characterized by the presence of two types of fronds, fertile foliage fronds and sterile nest fronds. The dark green foliage fronds are large, 60–120 centimetres (24–47 in) long, with elongated stalks. They are deeply lobed or pinnate, winged, and bear sori (structures producing and containing spores) on the bottom surfaces.

The nest fronds are smaller rounded leaves basal to the foliage fronds. They do not bear sori and are persistent, not being shed after turning brown and dying. They form a characteristic 'basket' that collect litter and organic debris, hence the common name. The collected debris decompose into humus, providing the plants with nutrients it would otherwise not have received from being suspended above the ground.

Both frond types grow from rhizomes typically anchored to a tree or a rock. The rhizomes of basket ferns are creeping and densely covered in brown scales. Some species, such as Drynaria heracleum, have very large fronds.

== Habitat and distribution ==
Basket ferns are epiphytic (growing on trees) or epipetric (growing on rocks). They can also sometimes be found in man-made structures like brick walls. They are found in wet tropical environments, usually in rainforests. Their native range extends from equatorial Africa to tropical South and East Asia, Southeast Asia, Australia, and Oceania.

== Life cycle ==
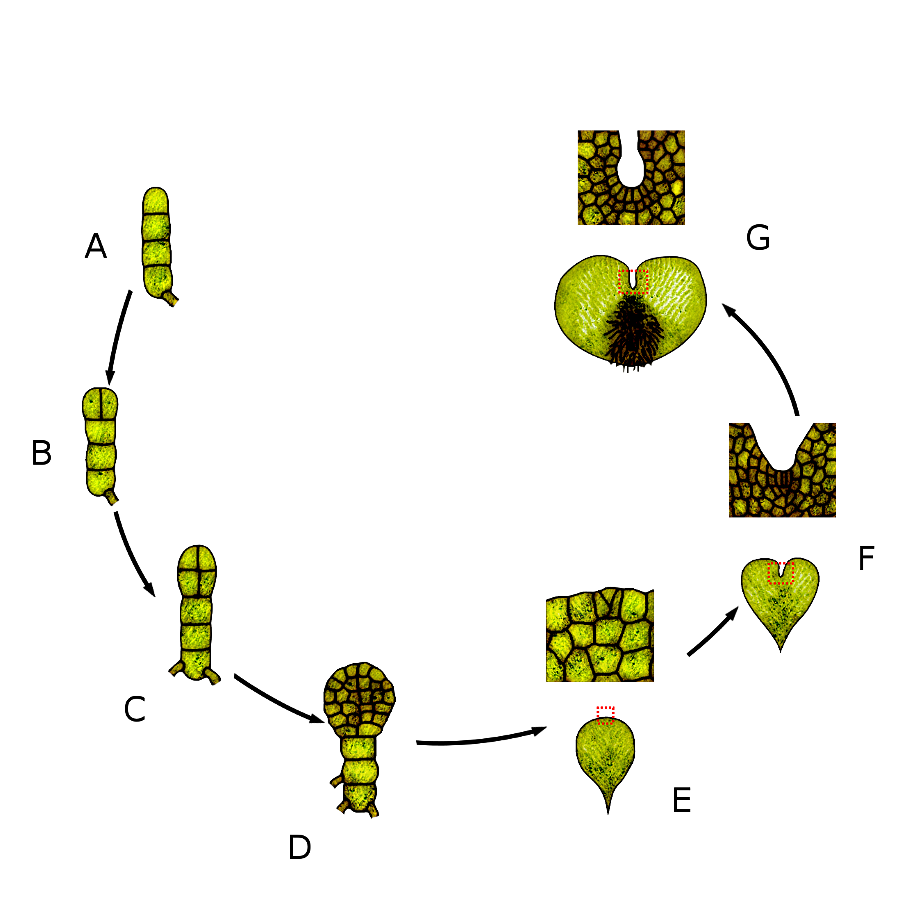
The "Drynaria" type prothallial germination.

Like other spore-bearing plants, Drynaria exhibits metagenesis or the alternation of generations. One generation being the diploid multicellular sporophyte (the phase where the plant is most familiar), and the other being the haploid multicellular gametophyte (the phase where the plant is known as a prothallus). Gametophytes develop from spores released by mature sporophytes; while sporophytes, in turn, develop from the fusion of gametes produced by mature prothalli.

The synonym Drynaria lends its name to a certain type of prothallial germination, the 'Drynaria type', observed in several other ferns. In this type, the spores germinate into a germ filament composed of barrel-shaped chlorophyllous cells with one or more rhizoids at the base cell. The tipmost cell divides repeatedly by cross-walls, forming a broad spatulate (spoon-shaped) prothallial plate. One of the cells at the top margin of the prothallus then divides obliquely when it has 5, 10, or more cells across its width. This results in an obconical meristematic cell. Division by this type of cell is parallel to each other and perpendicular to the rest of the cells, forming rows. This eventually results in the formation of a notch at the anterior edge of the prothallus, giving it a roughly heart-shaped appearance (cordate).

The cordate prothallus are usually smaller with thinner midribs than that of other members of Polypodiaceae. They are also usually more sparsely haired, with some prothalli rarely having multicellular hair. They mature after six to nine months, and finish their life cycle at around a year. The gametophytes produce male (antheridium), and female (archegonium) gametes. The gametes fuse, forming the diploid sporophyte, the 'fern' part of the life cycle.

Drynaria also naturally exhibits apospory, the production of a gametophyte not from spores, but directly from the vegetative cells of the sporophytes. Their leaves can develop prothalli under dim light and sporophytic buds in strong light.

== Ecology ==
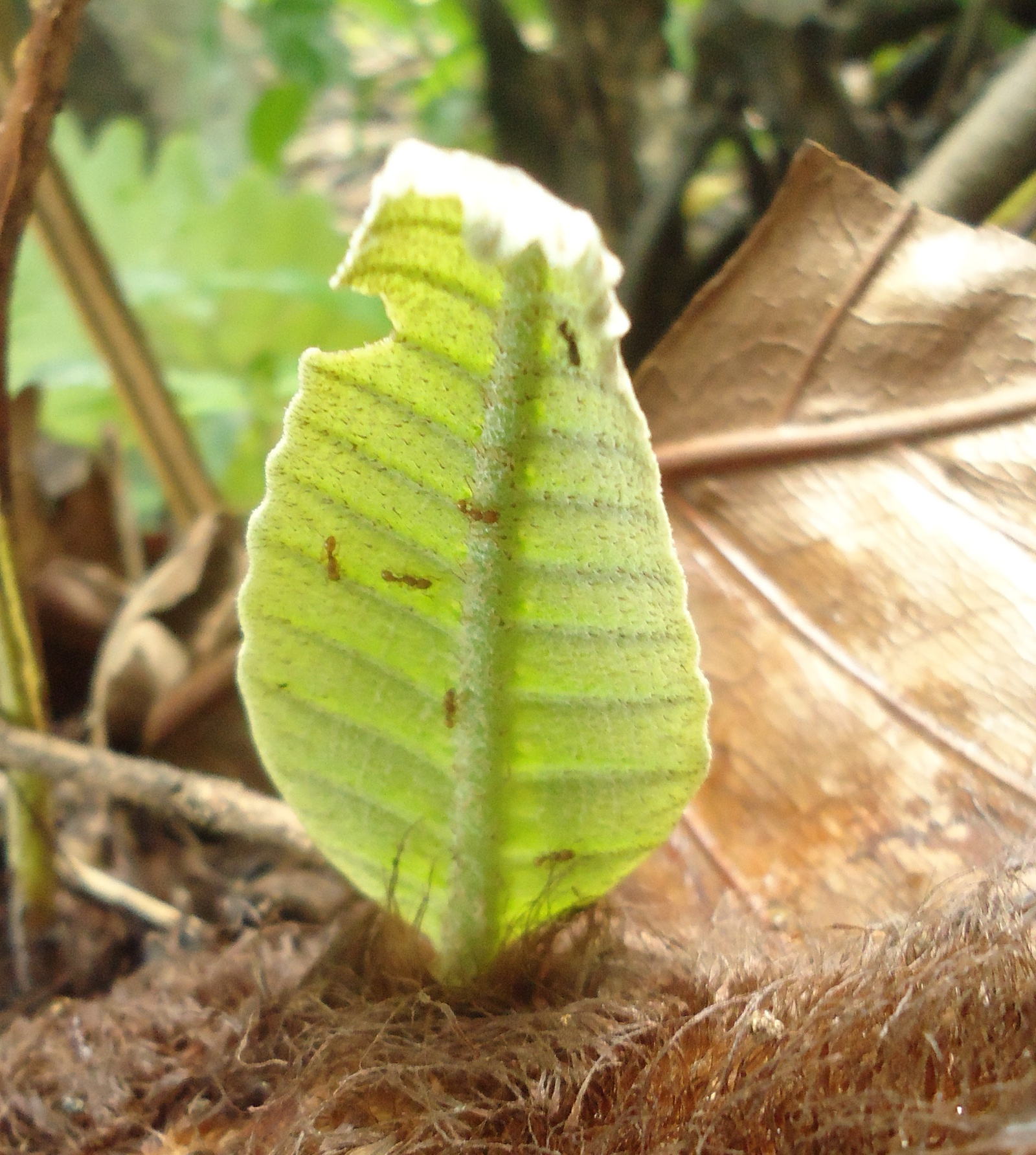
Ants feeding on nectar secreted by the lower surface of a young Drynaria quercifolia frond.

Drynaria, like some other genera of ferns (including Polybotrya and Polypodium), possess specialized nectar-secreting structures (nectaries) on the bases of the frond lobes or the underside of the fronds. The produced nectar is rich in sugars and amino acids.

Their function may be to attract ants (or other organisms) for protection or for spore dispersal. They may also be simply excretory organs (hydathodes), used for exuding surplus metabolic products. The ant species Iridomyrmex cordatus is commonly associated with D. quercifolia, in addition to other epiphytic plants.

In Australia, Drynaria rigidula serve as shelter for scrub pythons (Morelia kinghorni). As much as 81% of sightings of the snakes in one study were in large individuals of D. rigidula located about 17–40 m (56–131 ft) above the ground. Snakes seek shelter in D. rigidula more frequently during the colder seasons.

In the 19th century, Indigenous Australians were documented by the Norwegian explorer Carl Sofus Lumholtz to have hunted pythons regularly during the winter months by climbing up to individuals of D. rigidula. The large rhizome mass of Drynaria can also serve as growing substrates for other plants like the ribbon fern (Ophioglossum pendulum). Due to their ability to preserve moisture and persistence even after death, the nest leaves of Drynaria are also fertile hosts to a large number of water-borne fungi.

== Classification ==
Basket ferns are classified under the subfamily Drynarioideae of the family Polypodiaceae. Species belonging to Drynaria were once classified under the genus Polypodium (rockcap ferns), under the subgenus Drynaria.

== Species ==
As of October 2026, the Checklist of Ferns and Lycophytes of the World recognized the thirty-four species below.

- Drynaria baronii Diels
- Drynaria bonii Christ
- Drynaria brooksii (Copel.) Christenh.
- Drynaria cornucopia (Copel.) Alderw.
- Drynaria coronans (Wall. ex Mett.) J.Sm.
- Drynaria delavayi Christ
- Drynaria descensa Copel.
- Drynaria deuansavanhii Vongthavone & Tagane
- Drynaria drynarioides (Hook.) Christenh.
- Drynaria heracleum (Kunze) T.Moore
- Drynaria hieronymi (Brause) Christenh.
- Drynaria involuta Alderw.
- Drynaria latipinna (C.Chr.) Christenh.
- Drynaria laurentii (Christ) Hieron.
- Drynaria lineatisora Jiang, 2026.
- Drynaria meeboldii Rosenst.
- Drynaria meyeniana (Schott) Christenh.
- Drynaria mollis Bedd.
- Drynaria nectarifera (Becc. ex Baker) Diels
- Drynaria novoguineensis (Brause) Christenh.
- Drynaria parishii (Bedd.) Bedd.
- Drynaria parkinsonii (Baker) Diels
- Drynaria pilosa (J. Sm. ex Kunze) Christenh.
- Drynaria pleuridioides (Mett.) Diels
- Drynaria propinqua (Wall. ex Mett.) J.Sm. ex Bedd.
- Drynaria quercifolia (L.) J.Sm.
- Drynaria rigidula (Sw.) Bedd.
- Drynaria roosii Nakaike
- Drynaria sagitta (Christ) Christenh.
- Drynaria sparsisora (Desv.) T.Moore
- Drynaria speciosa (Blume) Christenh.
- Drynaria splendens (J.Sm.) Bedd.
- Drynaria tricuspis (Hook.) Christenh.
- Drynaria volkensii Hieron.
- Drynaria willdenowii (Bory) T.Moore

Three hybrids have also been described:

- Drynaria × dumicola Bostock
- Drynaria × leporella K.I.Goebel
- Drynaria × robertsii (Hoshiz.) Z.H.Feng

== Traditional medicine ==
Extracts from the rhizomes of some Drynaria species are used extensively in traditional medicine. In China, Taiwan, Vietnam, Thailand, and Laos, the rhizomes of gu-sui-bu, Drynaria roosii (more frequently cited by Asian authors by its illegitimate synonym Drynaria fortunei), are commonly used to treat bone injuries. Its common name literally means "mender of shattered bones" in Chinese. Another species, the oak-leaf fern (Drynaria quercifolia) is used similarly in South Asia and Maritime Southeast Asia.

== Conservation ==
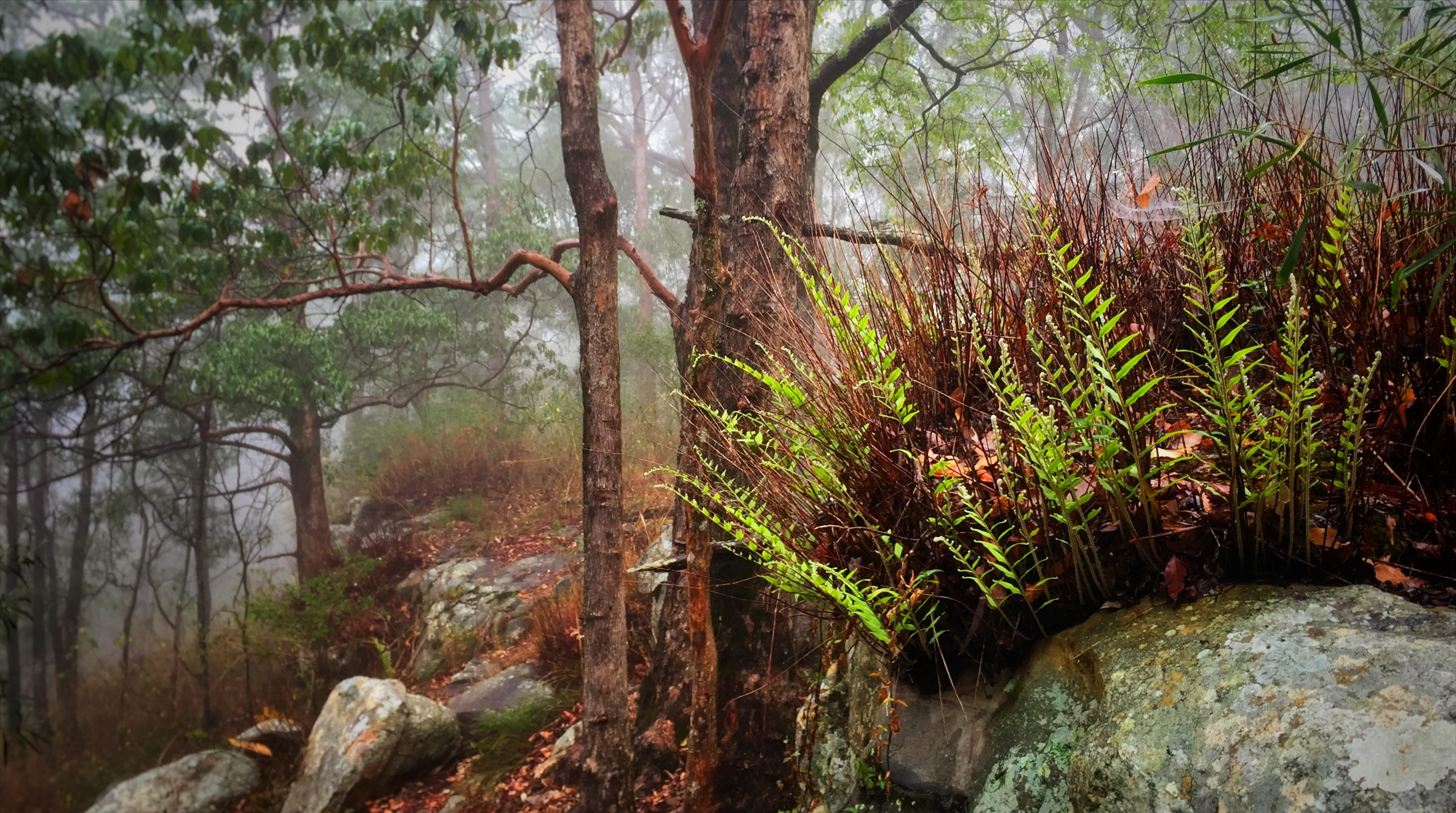
A basket fern in Ravensbourne National Park, Australia

Species of Drynaria commonly used in traditional medicine like D. roosii and D. quercifolia are in danger of being overexploited. None of the species are currently cultivated for the alternative medicine industry.

Drynaria are also considered endangered in some areas (like in New South Wales, Australia), due to threats of habitat loss and low population numbers.

== Evolution and fossil record ==
In 2010, twelve well-preserved fossil specimens were described from the Sanying Formation of the Yangjie coal mine of China. Named Drynaria callispora, it comes from the Piacenzian age of the Pliocene epoch (about 3.6 to 2.5 million years ago).

The fossil record of drynarioids is not very well documented due to the typically poor preservation of fossils recovered. Previous fossil species assigned to Drynaria include Drynaria astrostigma, D. dura, and D. tumulosa from the Cenomanian of the Czech Republic; and D. durum, all assigned tentatively to the genus in 1899. The arrangement and type of their sori, however, indicate that they are members of the family Matoniaceae instead.

Outside the genus, Protodrynaria takhtajani from the Eocene-Oligocene boundary of Kursk Oblast, Russia shows some affinities to Drynaria but only distantly. The only other reasonably convincing fossil remains of drynarioids aside from D. callispora was a specimen named Polypodium quercifolia recovered in 1985 from the Late Miocene (23.03 to 5.332 million years ago) of Palembang, Indonesia. These were later transferred to the living species Drynaria heracleum. It remains, as of 2011, the oldest known drynarioid.

== See also ==
- Platycerium – staghorn or elkhorn ferns
- Asplenium – spleenworts, bird's-nest ferns, and walking ferns
- Polypodium – rockcap ferns
