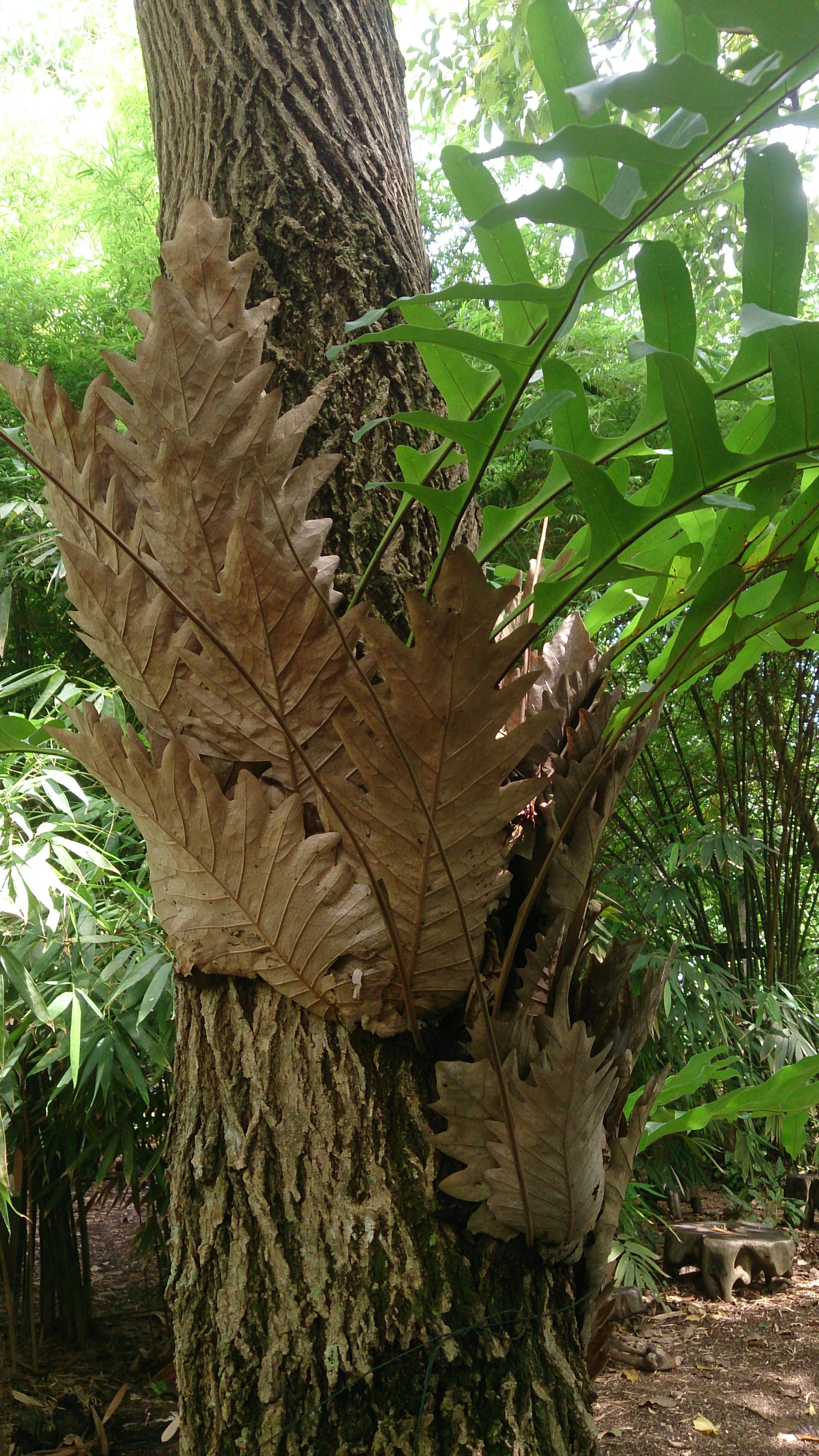

Scientific classification
- Kingdom: Plantae
- Clade: Tracheophytes
- Division: Polypodiophyta
- Class: Polypodiopsida
- Order: Polypodiales
- Suborder: Polypodiineae
- Family: Polypodiaceae
- Genus: Drynaria
- Species: D. quercifolia

Binomial name
- Drynaria quercifolia (L.) J.Sm.

Synonyms
- Aglaomorpha quercifolia (L.) Hovenkamp & S.Linds.; Drynaria brancifolia (C.Presl) Moore; Drynaria morbillosa (C.Presl) Moore; Drynariopsis morbillosa (C.Presl) Copel.; Phymatodes brancifolia (C.Presl) C.Presl; Phymatodes morbillosa C.Presl; Phymatodes quercifolia (L.) C.Presl; Phymatodes sylvatica (Schkuhr) C.Presl; Polypodium brancifolium C.Presl; Polypodium conjugatum Poir.; Polypodium morbillosum C.Presl; Polypodium quercifolium L.; Polypodium quercioides Desv.; Polypodium schkuhrii Bory; Polypodium sylvaticum Schkuhr

= Drynaria quercifolia =

Oakleaf fern

Species of fern

Drynaria quercifolia (synonym Aglaomorpha quercifolia), commonly known as the oakleaf fern or oakleaf basket fern, is a species of Drynaria in the family Polypodiaceae. Other common names for the fern are pakpak lawin, gurar, koi hin, ashvakatri, kabkab, kabkaban, or uphatkarul, Aatukāl kilangu.

== Distribution ==
Drynaria quercifolia is native to India, Southeast Asia, Malaysia, Indonesia, the Philippines, New Guinea, and Australia.

== Description ==
It is a large species with deeply pinnatifid foliage fronds. The nest fronds resemble the leaves of oaks, hence the common name. The sori are either scattered or arranged in two regular rows in between the secondary veins.

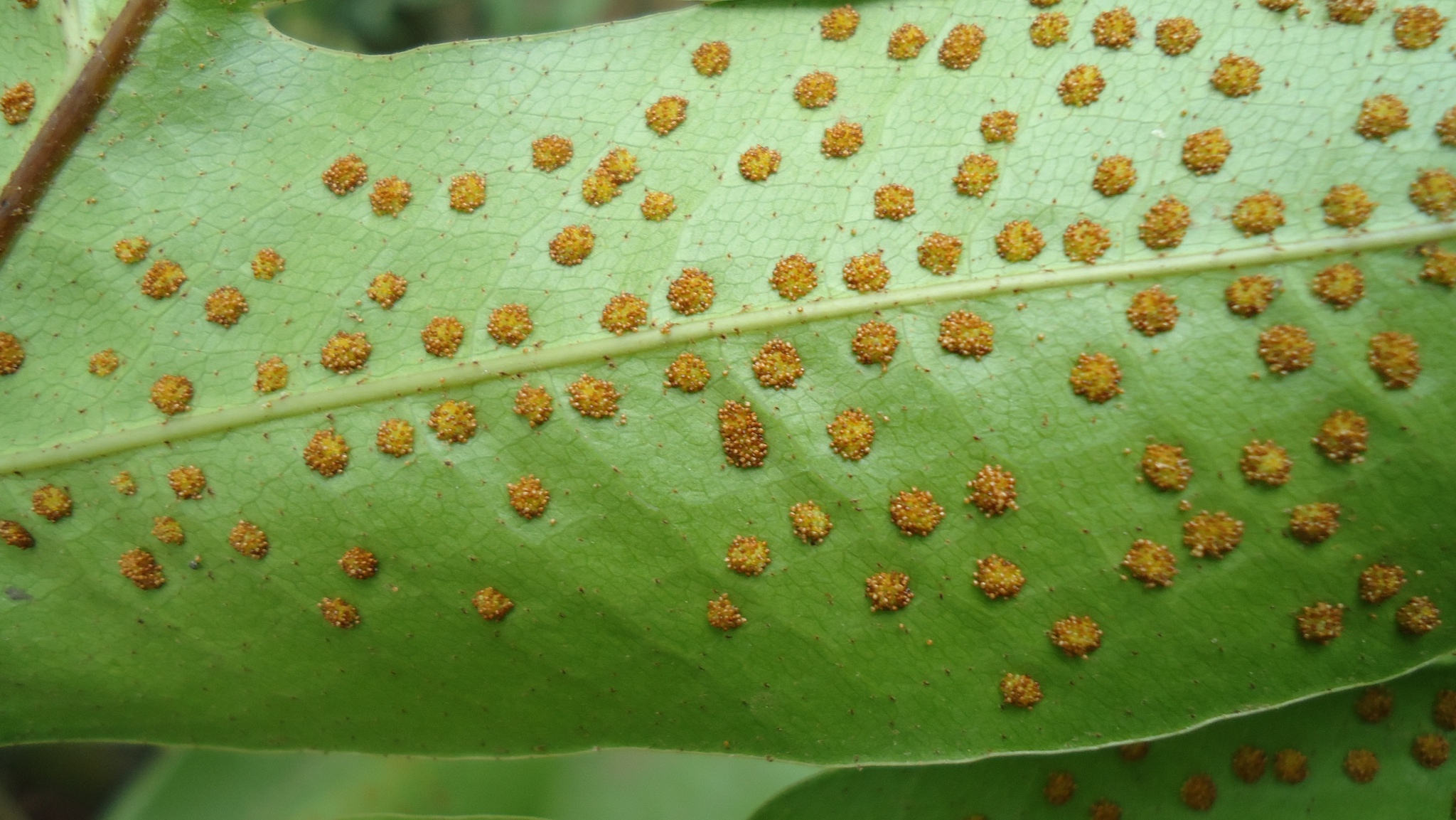
Sporangia

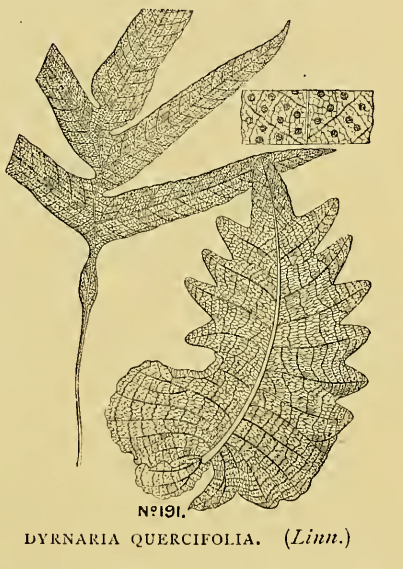
Illustration of Drynaria quercifolia in Richard Henry Beddome's "Ferns of British India, Ceylon, and the Malay Peninsula" (published 1892).

== Trivia ==
"Kabkab", one of the plant's nicknames ("kabkaban" collectively for clumps of ferns), was the inspiration for the old name of Carcar, one of the towns of the province of Cebu in the Philippines. This was due to the abundance of these fern plants in the trunks and branches of the large trees, as well as the lowlands surrounding the area of the town. Currently, the term "kabkaban" refers to the town's local festival in honor of St. Catherine of Alexandria, which celebrates the town's musical history. The Kabkaban Festival is held around the 23rd to the 25th of November.
