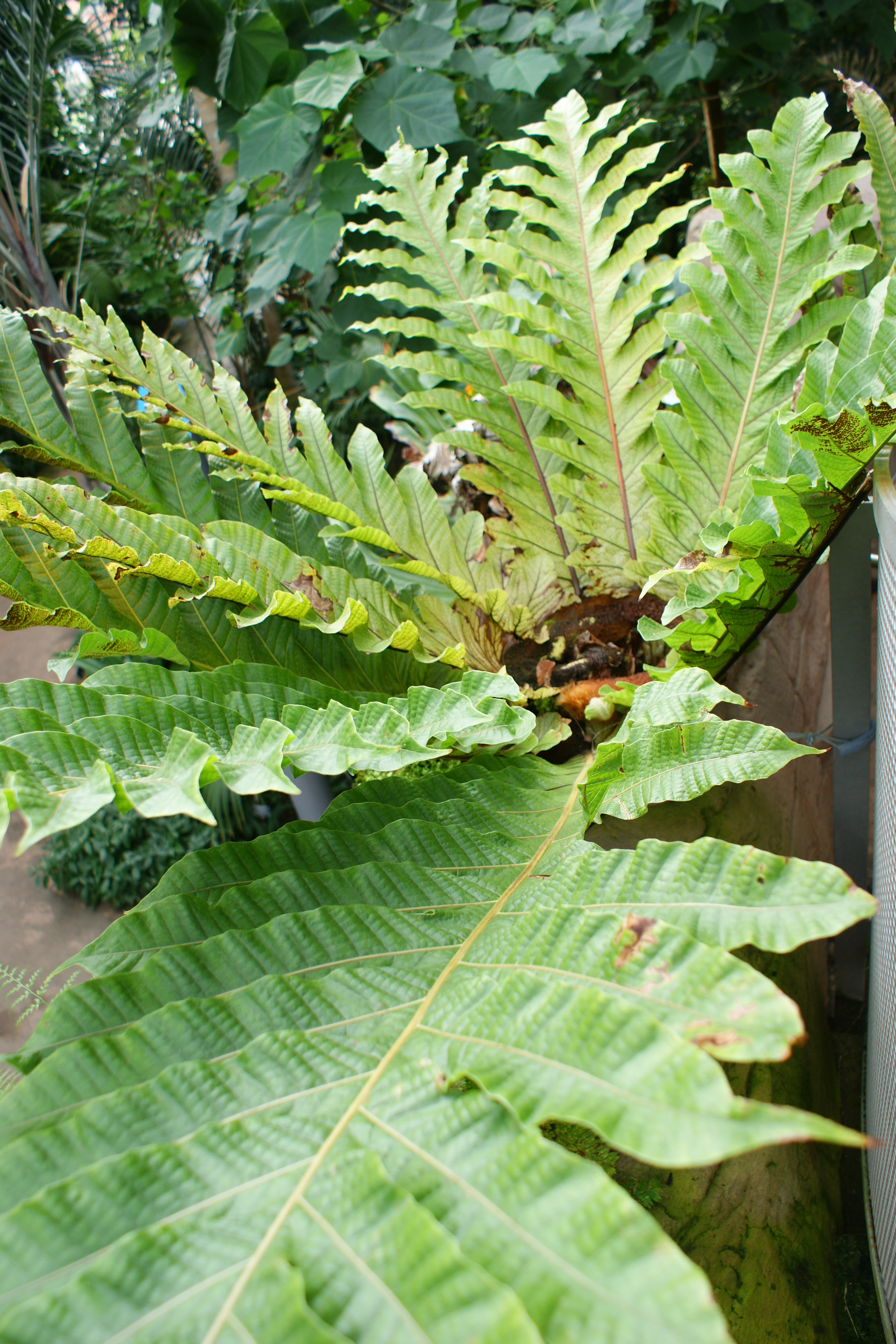
- At Berlin Botanical Garden

Scientific classification
- Kingdom: Plantae
- Clade: Tracheophytes
- Division: Polypodiophyta
- Class: Polypodiopsida
- Order: Polypodiales
- Suborder: Polypodiineae
- Family: Polypodiaceae
- Genus: Drynaria
- Species: D. heracleum

Binomial name
- Drynaria heracleum (Kunze) T.Moore

= Drynaria heracleum =

Species of fern

Drynaria heracleum is one of the basket ferns in the family Polypodiaceae, native to the East Indies and Malay Peninsula. Its common name is paku suloh. Its most noticeable feature is its leaves, in form resembling artichoke leaves, but with a broadly auriculate base, and up to 250 cm (98 in) to even 270 cm (110 in) long, and up to 80 cm (31 in) wide; they grow from a 2–3 cm thick root-climbing stem that spirals around tree trunks.
