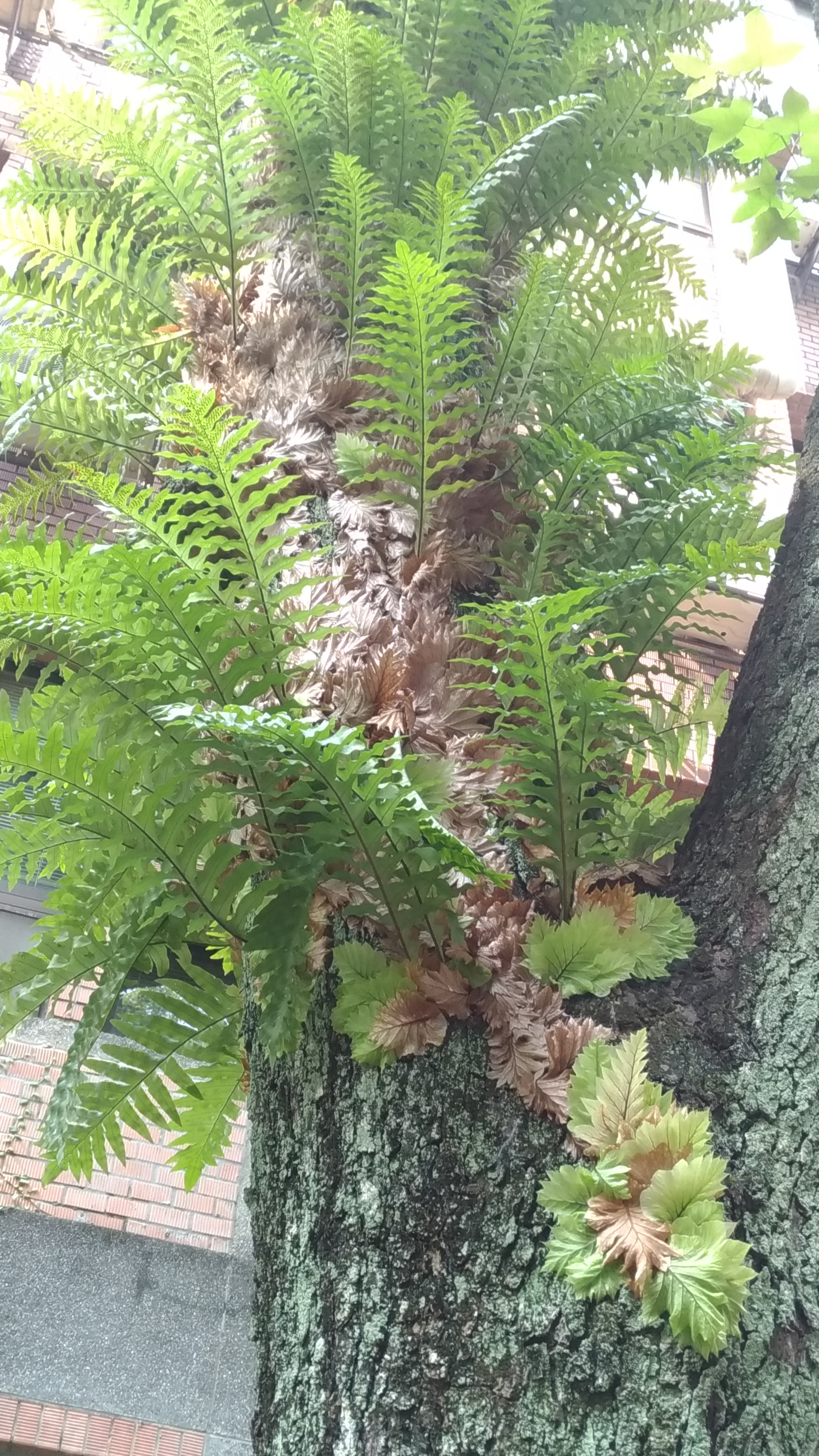

Scientific classification
- Kingdom: Plantae
- Clade: Tracheophytes
- Division: Polypodiophyta
- Class: Polypodiopsida
- Order: Polypodiales
- Suborder: Polypodiineae
- Family: Polypodiaceae
- Genus: Drynaria
- Species: D. roosii

Binomial name
- Drynaria roosii Nakaike

Synonyms
- Aglaomorpha fortunei (Kunze ex Mett.) Hovenkamp & S. Linds.; Drynaria fortunei (Kunze ex Mett.) J.Sm., nom. illeg.; Polypodium fortunei Kunze ex Mett.

= Drynaria roosii =

Species of plant

Drynaria roosii, commonly known as gu-sui-bu, is a species of basket fern of the family Polypodiaceae. The plant is native to Eastern Asia, including eastern China.

It is used in traditional Chinese medicine. This species is also more frequently cited by Asian studies by its synonym, Drynaria fortunei; however, this is an illegitimate name.

== Description ==
Drynaria roosii is an epiphytic (growing on trees) or epipetric (growing on rocks) plant. Like other species of Drynaria, they possess two frond types – a fertile foliage frond and a sterile nest frond.

Sterile nest fronds are rounded shallowly-lobed reddish-brown fronds overlapping each other. They bear no sori and form a 'basket' characteristic of the genus. The fertile fronds are larger and deeply lobed. They bear 1 to 3 sori arranged on both sides of the central rib.

== Taxonomy ==
The species was first described in 1856 as Polypodium fortunei by Mettenius, using a name chosen by Gustav Kunze for labeling it in his herbarium. In 1857, J. Smith transferred the species to the genus Drynaria, using the name "Drynaria fortunei". However, although widely used, this is an illegitimate name, because it had been published in 1855 for a different species. In 1992, Toshiyuki Nakaike published the replacement name, Drynaria roosii, which is the correct name for the species if placed in the genus Drynaria.

In the Pteridophyte Phylogeny Group classification of 2016 (PPG I), the genus Aglaomorpha is placed in the subfamily Drynarioideae of the family Polypodiaceae.

== Medicinal uses ==
Preparations from the rhizomes of Drynaria roosii are used in traditional herbal medicine for aiding in the healing of bone fractures and for treating rheumatoid arthritis.

== Pharmacological study ==
Modern studies of Drynaria roosii have identified in vitro effects on isolated bone cells.

Flavan-3-ols and propelargonidins can be isolated from the rhizomes.

== Vernacular names ==
Drynaria roosii is known as gu-sui-bu (骨碎補) in Chinese (English: "mender of shattered bones"). A reference to its use in traditional Chinese medicine for healing broken bones.

Other common names in Chinese include mao-chiang ('hairy ginger'), shih-pan chiang ('stony plate ginger'), wang-chiang, shih-chiang, hou-chiang ('monkey ginger'), p'a shan hu (mountain-climbing tiger), feng chiang, p-yen chiang, hou-sheng chiang, and hou chueh.

It is also known as gol-se-bo in Korean and Cốt toái bổ in Vietnamese.

== See also ==
- Bone healing
- Basket ferns
