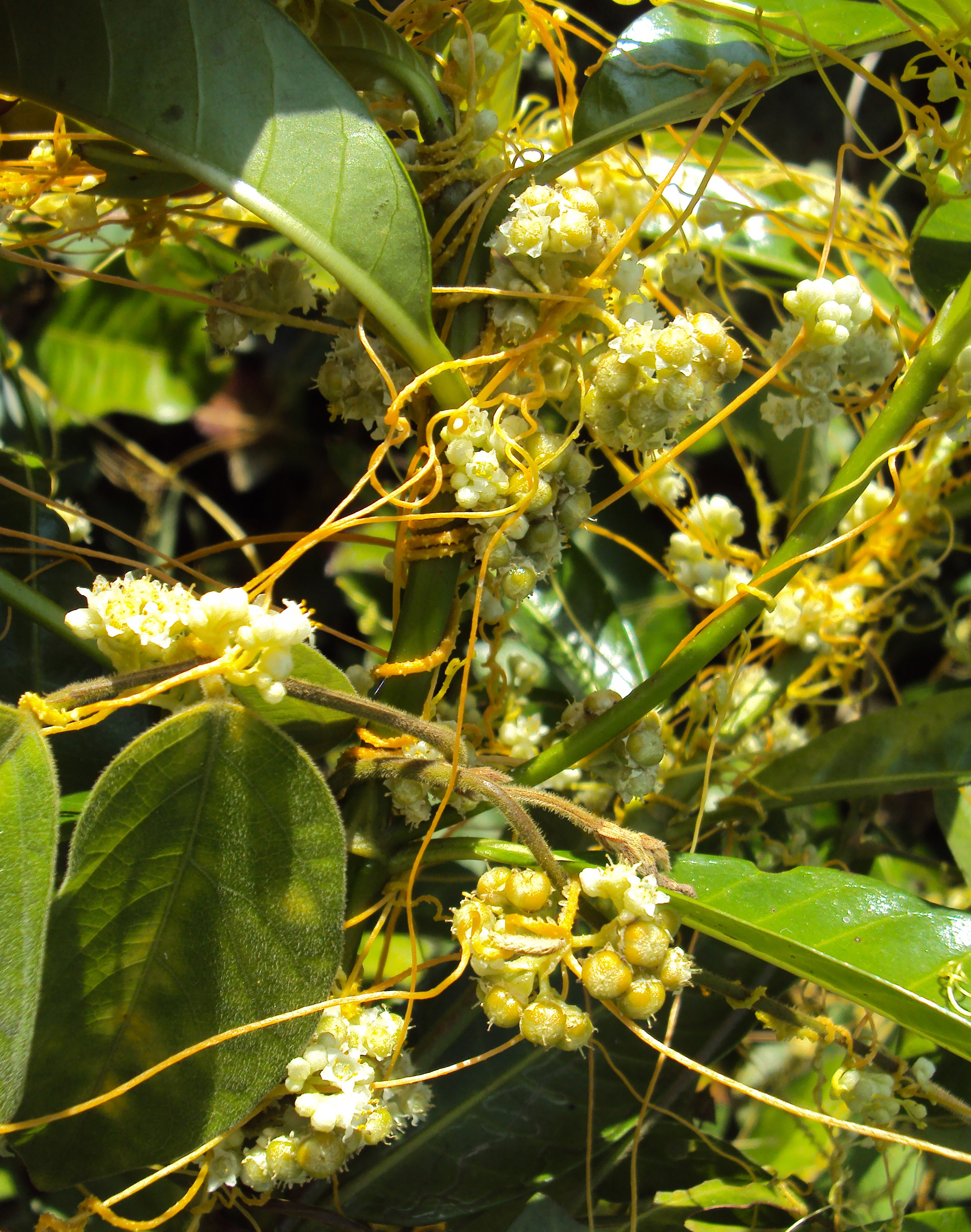

Scientific classification
- Kingdom: Plantae
- Clade: Tracheophytes
- Clade: Angiosperms
- Clade: Eudicots
- Clade: Asterids
- Order: Solanales
- Family: Convolvulaceae
- Genus: Cuscuta
- Species: C. chinensis

Binomial name
- Cuscuta chinensis Lam.

Synonyms
- Grammica chinensis (Lam.) Hadač & Chrtek

= Cuscuta chinensis =

Species of flowering plant

Cuscuta chinensis is a stem holoparasite vine in the family Convolvulaceae. It was first described in China in 1786.

== Description ==
C. chinensis is a thin, yellow vine lacking leaves or roots. It produces glomerulate to dense paniculiform inflorescences composed of white-cream 5-merous flowers that are very small, have two styles with capitate stigmata, and produce 3–4 obovoid seeds per capsule. Its pollen grains are small, colporate, and covered by a finely reticulate ektexine.

C. chinensis var. chinensis has been observed to flower from June–October, December–March, and February–May. It is found throughout western Asia, tropical Asia, eastern Asia, and Australasia at latitudes between 20° N and 50° N. Specimens of Cuscuta campestris are occasionally mislabeled as C. chinensis; the two species can be differed by C. chinensis's carinate calyx lobes, incurved but not inflexed corolla lobes, and dehiscent seed capsule.

C. chinensis var. applanata flowers from June to October and is found in Mexico and the southwestern US.

== Use in traditional medicine ==
C. chinensis is used medicinally in many Asian countries, including China, Korea, Pakistan, Vietnam, India, Thailand, Nepal, and Inner Mongolia. Biochemical analysis has found at least 93 pharmacologically active phytochemicals present in C. chinensis correlated with its use as an anti-inflammatory agent, anti-aging agent, pain reliever, or aphrodisiac.

In Traditional Chinese Medicine

Cuscuta chinensis is used as a tonic medicine by traditional Chinese medicine practitioners for the treatment of kidney and liver deficiency.
