= Ledebouriella =

Scientific classification
- Kingdom: Plantae
- Clade: Tracheophytes
- Clade: Angiosperms
- Clade: Eudicots
- Clade: Asterids
- Order: Apiales
- Family: Apiaceae
- Subfamily: Apioideae
- Tribe: Selineae
- Genus: Ledebouriella; H.Wolff
- Species: L. multiflora

Binomial name
- Ledebouriella multiflora (Ledeb.) H.Wolff

Synonyms
- Rumia multiflora Ledeb.; Stenocoelium tenuifolium Korovin

Species of flowering plant

Ledebouriella is a monotypic genus of flowering plants belonging to the family Apiaceae. It only contains one known species, Ledebouriella multiflora (Ledeb.) H.Wolff.

It is native to Kazakhstan in Central Asia.

The genus name of Ledebouriella is in honour of Carl Friedrich von Ledebour (1786–1851), a German-Estonian botanist. The Latin specific epithet of multiflora means multiple flowers. Both genus and species were first described and published in H.G.A.Engler (editor.), Das Pflanzenreich, IV, Vol.228 (Edition 43) on page 191 in 1910.
