= Hansenia weberbaueriana =

Scientific classification
- Kingdom: Plantae
- Clade: Tracheophytes
- Clade: Angiosperms
- Clade: Eudicots
- Clade: Asterids
- Order: Apiales
- Family: Apiaceae
- Genus: Hansenia
- Species: H. weberbaueriana

Binomial name
- Hansenia weberbaueriana (Fedde ex H.Wolff) Pimenov & Kljuykov

Synonyms
- Ligusticum weberbauerianum Fedde ex H.Wolff; Notopterygium weberbauerianum (Fedde ex H.Wolff) Pimenov & Kljuykov; Hansenia pinnatiinvolucellata (F.T.Pu & Y.P.Wang) Pimenov & Kljuykov; Ligusticum pilgerianum H.Wolff; Notopterygium incisum K.C.Ting ex H.T.Chang; Notopterygium pinnatiinvolucellatum F.T.Pu & Y.P.Wang

Species of flowering plant

Hansenia weberbaueriana, synonym Notopterygium incisum, is a species of flowering plant in the family Apiaceae, native from northeastern Tibet to central China. It is known as the notopterygium root. Its root and rhizome parts of the plant have long been used in traditional Chinese medicine, and the plant continues to be thoroughly studied to this day. As a result of its use, it has become endangered due to excessive cultivation for use in commercial products.

== Distribution ==
Hansenia weberbaueriana grows naturally in the provinces of Gansu, Qinghai, Shaanxi, Sichuan, and Xizang, China. It is predominantly found on several mountains and counties including, Duzhe mountain of Kangding County, and Goaoershi mountain of Yajiang county, and the Litangjunba, Daofu, Luhuo, Seda, Ganzi, and north-central region of Schicu county. Much of the native population is at risk from overharvesting, fragmentation, and environmental degradation, however new harvesting efforts are being assessed (in these same Provinces) in order to protect the species. Studies show that the species has the best chance for sustainability in the provinces which it has previously grown naturally.

== Habitat and ecology ==
The perennial Hansenia weberbaueriana grows at a range of 1600 to 5000 meters above sea level. It lives among forest edges and scrubs that border the grasslands of these elevated slopes. In a controlled study, the most preferred soil habitat for seedling germination was at 15 °C, in a loosely packed medium with high organic content. While this was in an incubated setting, it is generally acceptable to assume that natural conditions are at least somewhat similar.

== Morphology ==
Individuals of this species are herbaceous and are rhizomatic. The aromatic, clustered roots are dark brown and often have node scarring. The rhizome portion which grows as a horizontal stem underground gives rise to new roots, and also shoots which eventually produce stems and then flowers. The leaves are ternate-3-pinnate with calyx teeth and petioles about 5–12 cm long. The shoots can have anywhere from 3-6 linear bracts about 1–3 cm long. The flowers are located in crowded, umbellules.

== Flowers and fruit ==
Flowers of Hansenia weberbaueriana, as mentioned above are located in very dense umbellues and can be described as "many flowered." The petals are white/greenish-white, in ovate/oblong-ovate shape that are 1.5 by 1mm in size. They are arranged apex obtuse and are inflexed. The fruits are oblong-ellipsoid shaped and range from 5–6 by 2.5-3.5mm in size. Flowering takes place from July to August while fruits follow in the months of August to September.

== Traditional medicine ==
The plant has numerous medical uses, yet its main use is in the traditional Chinese medicine "qiang huo." The roots and rhizome of the plant are used in herbal preparations for a series of symptoms from the common cold, chills, fever, rheumatoid arthritis, and general limb or body aches and pains. The herb finds use in traditional medicine to relieve discomfort due to aching in the limbs and joints, especially in the upper part of the body.

== Chemical constituents ==
In a study of both the roots and rhizome, it was found that they have a total of 24 different compounds. The most notable compounds include:

- Furanocoumarins such as notopterol which have anti-proliferative (anti-cell growth), and apoptotic (cell death) effects on certain cancer cells in vitro.
- Falcarindiol which activates the nuclear receptor PPARgamma, and induces expression of antioxidant enzymes in vitro.
- Phenethyl ferulate, which is a cyclooxygenase inhibitor in vitro.
