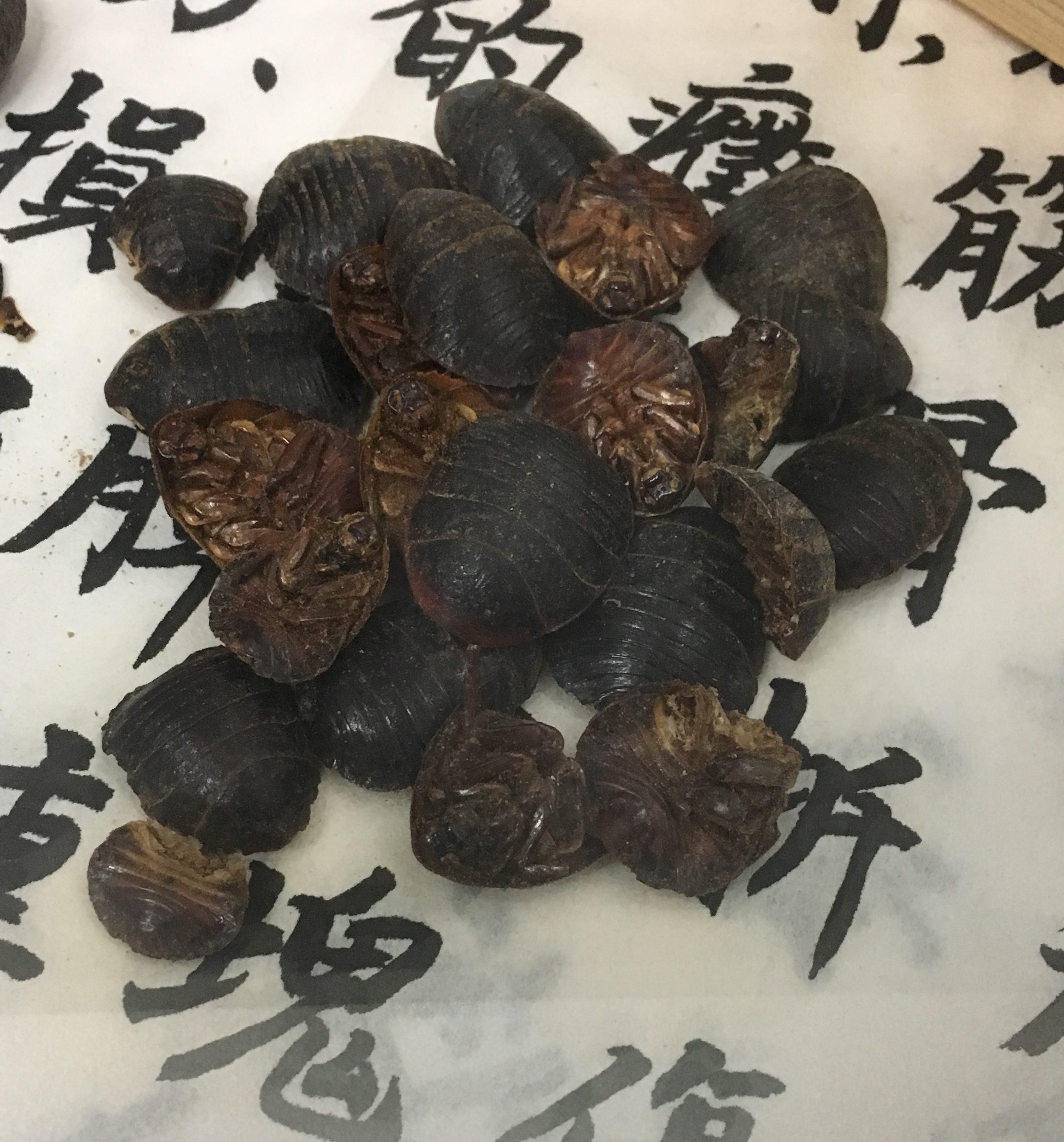
- Dried females, used in traditional Chinese medicine.

Scientific classification
- Kingdom: Animalia
- Phylum: Arthropoda
- Clade: Pancrustacea
- Class: Insecta
- Order: Blattodea
- Family: Corydiidae
- Genus: Eupolyphaga
- Species: E. sinensis

Binomial name
- Eupolyphaga sinensis (Walker, 1868)

Synonyms
- Polyphaga sinensis (Walker, 1868); Homœogamia sinensis (Saussure, 1869); Heterogamia sinensis (Dohrn, 1888); Heterogamia dohrniana (Saussure, 1893); Polyphaga limbata (Kirby, 1903); Eupolyphaga limbata (Wu, 1935)

= Eupolyphaga sinensis =

Species of cockroach

Eupolyphaga sinensis (Chinese: 土鳖虫), is a species of cockroach in the genus Eupolyphaga. They are most abundant in Central and Northern China, but also extend into South Russia, and likely Mongolia. It is the most widely distributed species within the genus. E. sinensis are mainly scavengers which feed on plant debris.

It is well known for its use in traditional Chinese medicine. For commercial use they are bred and raised artificially, once mature they are collected, boiled in water, and dried either in the sun or by baking. Its common name in China, Tubiechong, is often used in reference to traditional Chinese medicine, it can also be used to generally mean a medicine which contains E. sinensis, along with other components. Tubiechong may also refer to several other cockroach species as medicine.

== Taxonomy ==
The species was originally described based on female morphology, being a member of Polyphaga, while the males were described as a separate species, Homœogamia sinensis. Further and re-examination resulted in Eupolyphaga sinensis being established. Historically males were confused with the species E. thibetana and E. yunnanensis, they are now recognized as separate species, having morphological differences that distinguish them.

E. sinensis was the first member of the family Corydiidae (at the time referred to as Polyphagidae) to have its mitochondrial DNA sequenced.

== Description ==
Eupolyphaga sinensis is often described as a wingless cockroach, this however is not entirely true. E. sinensis is a sexually dimorphic species, with the females being wingless, while the males are winged. Females are generally larger in size and darker in color than males.

Within their range E. sinensis display significant size differences based on temperature and latitude. Body size of both males and females increase at high and low latitudes, with those found at an intermediate range being smaller. This body size difference is a result of genetic differentiation between populations, being adapted to their native climate.

=== Females ===
Usually dark brown or reddish brown in color. Body length can range 23.4 to 30.2mm, and width ranges from 17.8 to 21.5mm.

=== Males ===
Males are smaller in size than females, and winged. Their body ranges 17.7 to 23.4mm in length, however their tegmina and wings are longer than their body giving them the appearance of bigger size, their overall length is 28.5 to 33.5mm. Tegmina are slightly translucent, light brownish yellow in color, with brown random speckling throughout. Variation in speckling can occur, with some individuals having reduced or limited spotting. The wings are similar in color as the tegmina. The males' body color is significantly lighter than the females, being light yellow to tan.

=== Nymphs ===
It is often difficult to distinguish Eupolyphaga species by their nymphs. Nymphs are generally similar in appearance to females, being reddish brown to dark brown in color, though lighter variations are possible. They will appear white in color prior to sclerotization. While common throughout the genus, sex of individuals can be determined in the last nymphal instar, largely due to their sexual dimorphism at maturity. Male nymphs have four distinct wing buds, while the females have none.

=== Ootheca ===
Ootheca can be used as a distinguishing trait between the species of Eupolyphaga. E. sinensis ootheca are reddish brown in color with long arched serrations along one side, and compact ridges run longitudinal along the surface.

== Habitat ==
The species occurs in a wide range of climate conditions, from subtropical to temperate conditions. Females and nymphs are often found in woody substrate, or under rocks. They are mainly nocturnal, hiding in dark places during the day, such as under rocks, in dead wood and bark, or in porous soil. E. sinensis is active from 15 to ≈ 34°C, being most active during late summer and early autumn.

== Reproduction and development ==
Eggs are laid in an ootheca which the female carries out the end of her abdomen for varying lengths of time. When ready she either deposits it on the ground, or attaches it to an object. The hardened ootheca helps protect the developing eggs. Optimal temperature range and patterns effect the hatch rate. Research has found that the best hatch rates occur when temperature alternates between 5°C and 30°C (the ootheca were left at the lower temperature for seven days, then left at the higher temperature for the remainder of development), the development time averages 44 days. Less effective temperature combinations may result in longer development times, alternating 10°C and 25°C, averages 61 days.

E. sinensis is considered to have a flexible life cycle, as length can vary from 1 to 3 years, depending on latitude the population is from. Females can survive up to 30 months, while males lifespan is much shorter. The variable lifespans correlates to varying number of instars, 7 to 9, or 9 to 11. Males generally develop faster than females. The species takes longer to develop at lower temperatures.

== Human use ==
Due to the increasing interest in E. sinensis in a variety of areas, large-scale breeding operations are being created across China.

=== Traditional Chinese medicine ===
Within traditional Chinese medicine E. sinensis was historically used to treat a variety of ailments, such as bruises, fractures, amenorrhea, postpartum blood stasis, and used as a pain reliever. Tubiechong could be prepared in different ways depending on what was being treated, preparation methods include, grinding, frying, water extraction, and rice wine extraction. The most common method being water or rice wine extraction. Only the females are used in medicine.

There are claims by TCM physicians that Tubiechong can reduce and treat tumors, via actions on blood vessels. The apparent effect on the blood vessels is why it was prescribed for the ailments it was (and still is).

=== Western medicine ===
There has been a recent increase in research to confirm the efficacy of some of the claimed benefits of E. sinensis, as well as find additional possible uses within the medical field.

Testing on immuno-suppressed mice has showed positive effects on immune system function. This points to an area of future research for human use.

Chitosan extraction for utilization in production of nanofiber membranes used for wound dressings. Research around nanofiber dressings has increased in recent years. Shrimp and crab chitosan is usually utilized, E. sinensis chitosan extraction has aims to address seasonal and regional restrictions.

=== Food ===
E. sinensis has a high protein content, so in some areas of China are used as food, and considered to be a delicacy by some. Traditionally only adult females are used medicinally and as food, due to the belief that females have better nutritional content compared to males. Recent research has found that nutritional composition varies by sex and life stage. When comparing males and females directly one is not inherently better than the other, their compositions are different but both valuable. Average protein content for E. sinensis was found to be 57.25 ± 6.12%, this is higher than most other edible insects, milk and eggs, but not quite as high as pork and beef. Nymph protein was significantly lower than adults. Fat content was comparable to that of pork and Orthoptera, ranging from 15.70 ± 0.78% to 18.89 ± 0.31%, but interestingly lower than other species within Blattodea. They are also a good source of essential minerals and amino acids.

E. sinensis is often described as having a strong fishy odor, and has a salty taste.

=== Aquaculture ===
There has been promising research in using E. sinensis as a partial food substitution in fish farming facilities. By replacing a certain percentage of fish meal based feed with E. sinensis in farmed largemouth bass larger fish with higher quality meat was produced.
