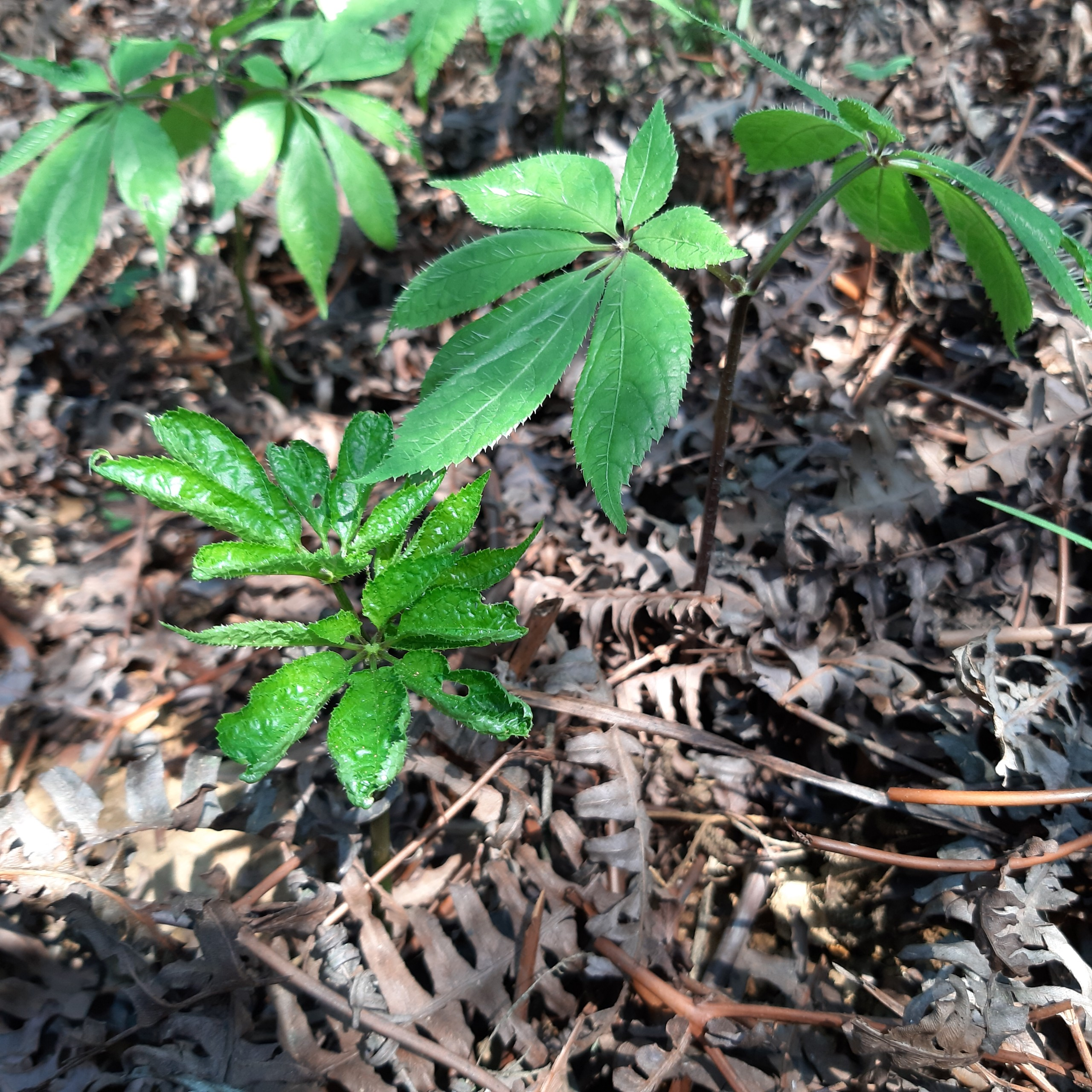

Scientific classification
- Kingdom: Plantae
- Clade: Tracheophytes
- Clade: Angiosperms
- Clade: Eudicots
- Clade: Asterids
- Order: Apiales
- Family: Araliaceae
- Genus: Panax
- Subgenus: Panax subg. Panax
- Species: P. pseudoginseng

Binomial name
- Panax pseudoginseng Wall.

Synonyms
- Aralia pseudoginseng (Wall.) Benth. ex C.B.Clarke

= Panax pseudoginseng =

Species of flowering plant

Panax pseudoginseng is a species of plant in the family Araliaceae, native to Nepal and Tibet. Common names include pseudoginseng, Nepal ginseng and Himalayan ginseng. Pseudoginseng belongs to the same scientific genus as ginseng.

== In local culture ==
In Latin, the word panax means "cure-all", and the family of ginseng plants is one of the best-known herbs.

== See also ==
- Panax notoginseng
