= Carl Friedrich von Ledebour =

German botanist (1786–1851)

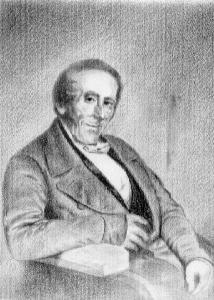
Carl Friedrich von Ledebour

Carl Friedrich von Ledebour (8 July 1786 in Stralsund – 4 July 1851 in Munich; also Karl Friedrich von Ledebour) was a Baltic German botanist.

Between 1811 and 1836, he was professor of science in the University of Tartu, Estonia.

His most important works were Flora Altaica, the first Flora of the Altay Mountains, published in 1833, and Flora Rossica, published in four volumes between 1841 and 1853, the first complete flora of the Russian Empire.

New species he described for the first time in the Flora Altaica include Malus sieversii (as Pyrus sieversii), the wild ancestor of the apple, and the Siberian Larch (Larix sibirica).

The plant genera Ledebouria (in the Asparagus family, Asparagaceae), and Ledebouriella (from the family Apiaceae) are named in his honor.

== Personal life ==
Ledebour was the son of the Swedish military Johann Ledebour and his mother was Anna Maria Hagemann.

== See also ==
- Category:Taxa named by Carl Friedrich von Ledebour
- List of Baltic German scientists

== Sources ==
- "Ледебур, Карл Фридрих" . Brockhaus and Efron Encyclopedic Dictionary (in Russian). 1906.
