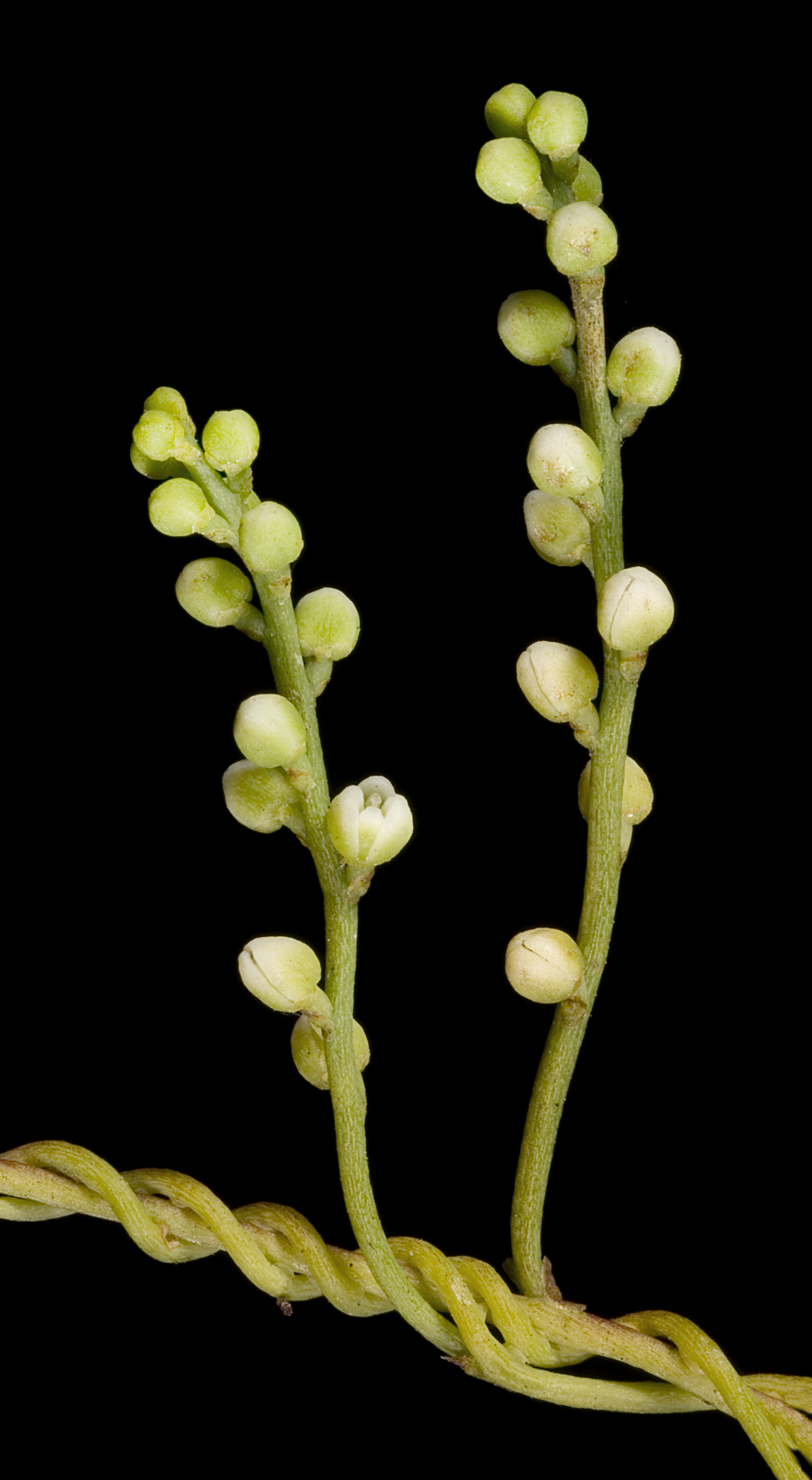

Scientific classification
- Kingdom: Plantae
- Clade: Tracheophytes
- Clade: Angiosperms
- Clade: Magnoliids
- Order: Laurales
- Family: Lauraceae
- Genus: Cassytha
- Species: C. racemosa

Binomial name
- Cassytha racemosa Nees

Synonyms
- Cassytha racemosa var. genuina Hochr.

= Cassytha racemosa =

Species of flowering plant

Cassytha racemosa (common name - dodder laurel) is a parasitic perennial in the Lauraceae family. It is found in Western Australia.

The species was first described in 1845 by Christian Gottfried Daniel Nees von Esenbeck from specimen 1623 found near the town of Fremantle growing on Melaleuca huegelii.
