= Love vine =

The name Love vine is variously applied to:

- Cassytha species alleged to have aphrodisiac properties
- Clematis virginiana, a North American ornamental vine.
- Cuscuta species confused with Cassytha
- Ipomoea lobata, or Mina lobata, a Brazilian vine related to Morning glory
