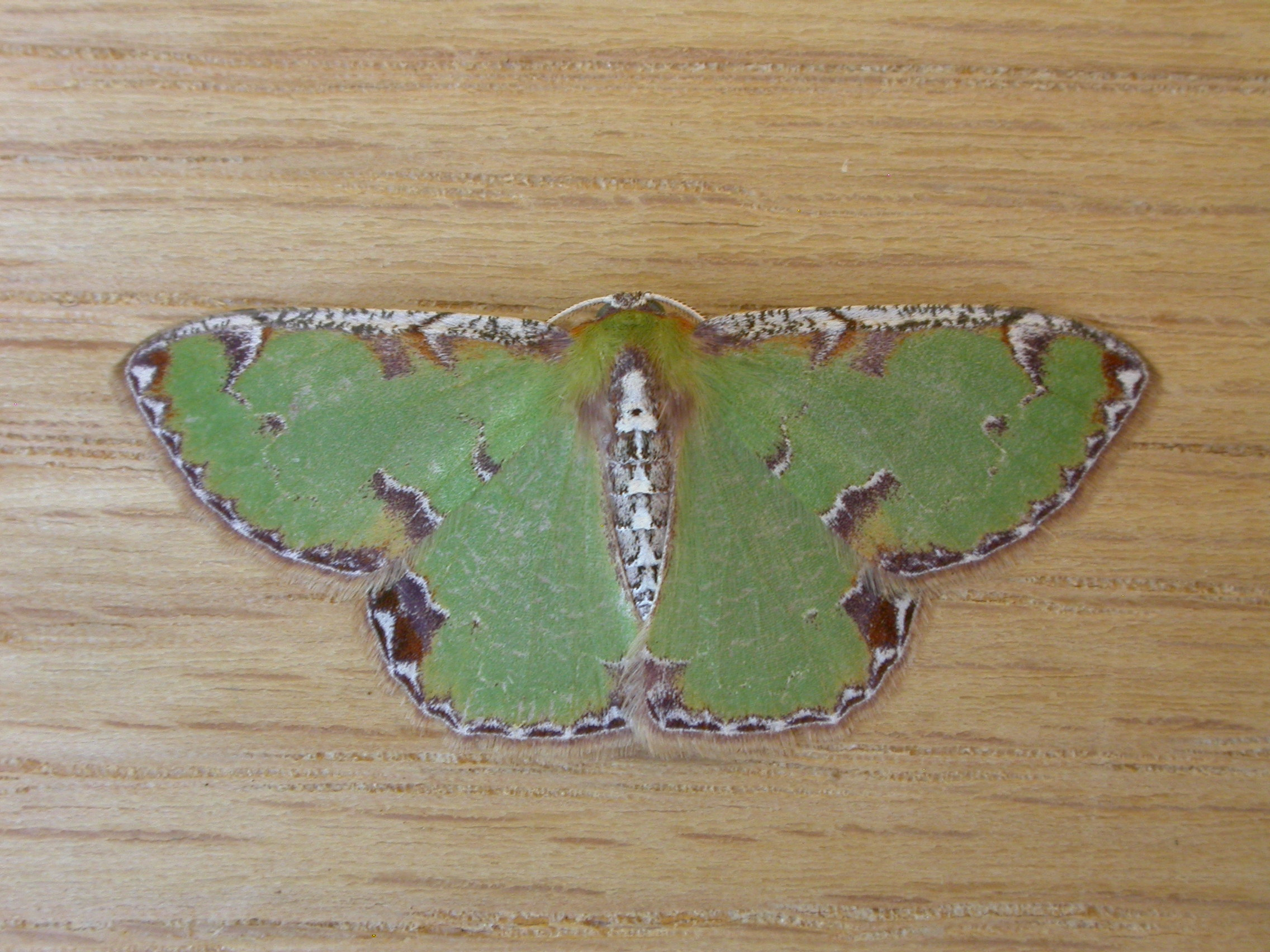

Scientific classification
- Kingdom: Animalia
- Phylum: Arthropoda
- Class: Insecta
- Order: Lepidoptera
- Family: Geometridae
- Genus: Eucyclodes
- Species: E. buprestaria

Binomial name
- Eucyclodes buprestaria Guenée, 1857

Synonyms
- Phorodesma buprestaria

= Eucyclodes buprestaria =

Species of moth

Eucyclodes buprestaria is a moth of the family Geometridae. It is found in the southern half of Australia and in Tasmania.

The wingspan is about 30 mm.

The larvae feed on Cassytha glabella and Cassytha pubescens.
