= Devil's darning needle =

Devil's darning needle may refer to:

- Clematis virginiana, a vine native to the United States.
- Dragonfly, an insect belonging to the order Odonata.
- Crane fly, an insect resembling a mosquito but bigger, belonging to the order Diptera.
- Stick insect, an insect which resembles a stick for camouflage.
