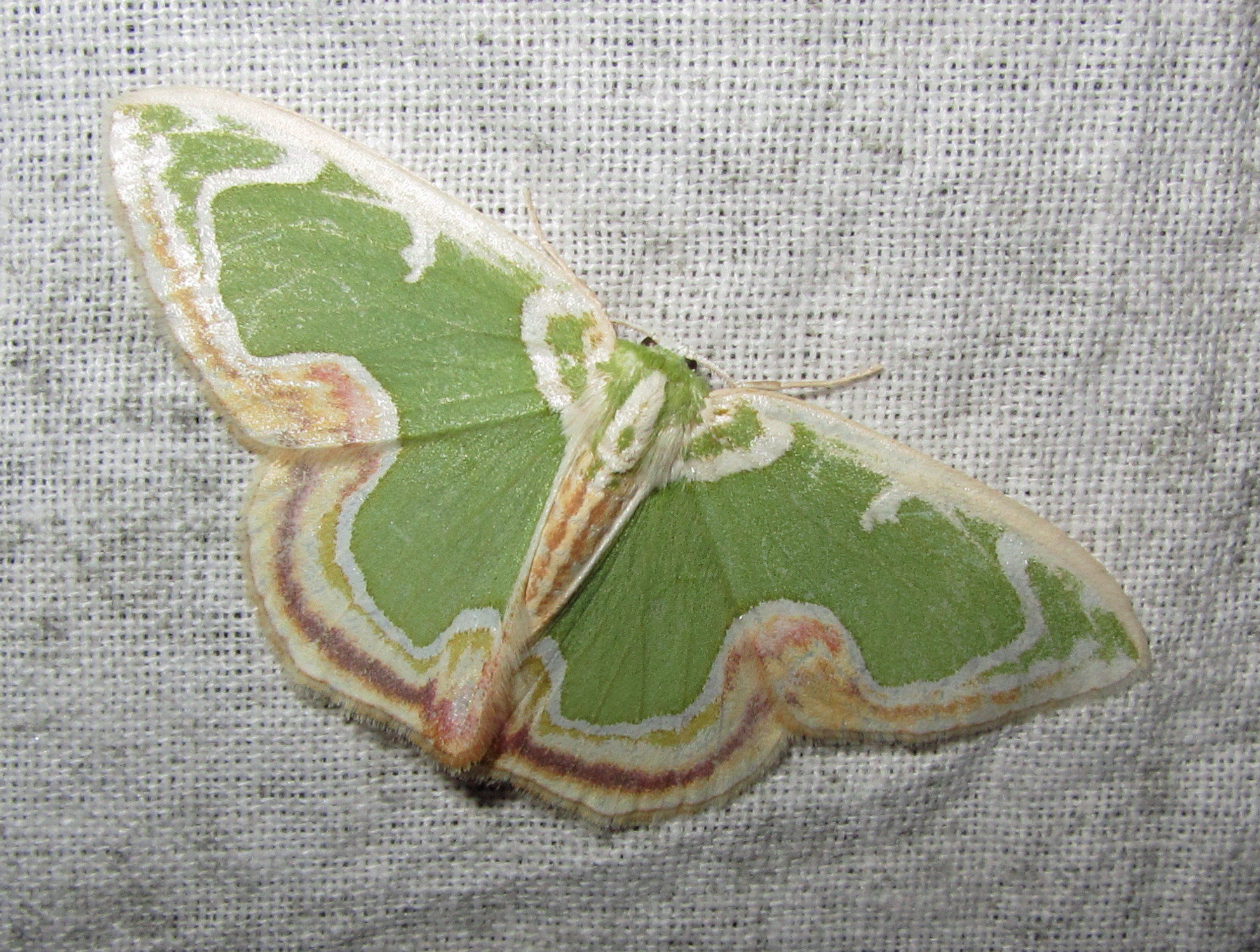

Scientific classification
- Domain: Eukaryota
- Kingdom: Animalia
- Phylum: Arthropoda
- Class: Insecta
- Order: Lepidoptera
- Family: Geometridae
- Genus: Eucyclodes
- Species: E. sanguilineata

Binomial name
- Eucyclodes sanguilineata (Moore, 1868)

Synonyms
- Comibaena sanguilineata Moore, [1868]; Osteosema sanguinilineata; Osteosema sanguilineata

= Eucyclodes sanguilineata =

Species of moth

Eucyclodes sanguilineata is a moth of the family Geometridae first described by Frederic Moore in 1868. It is found in Bengal in what is now India and Bangladesh.
