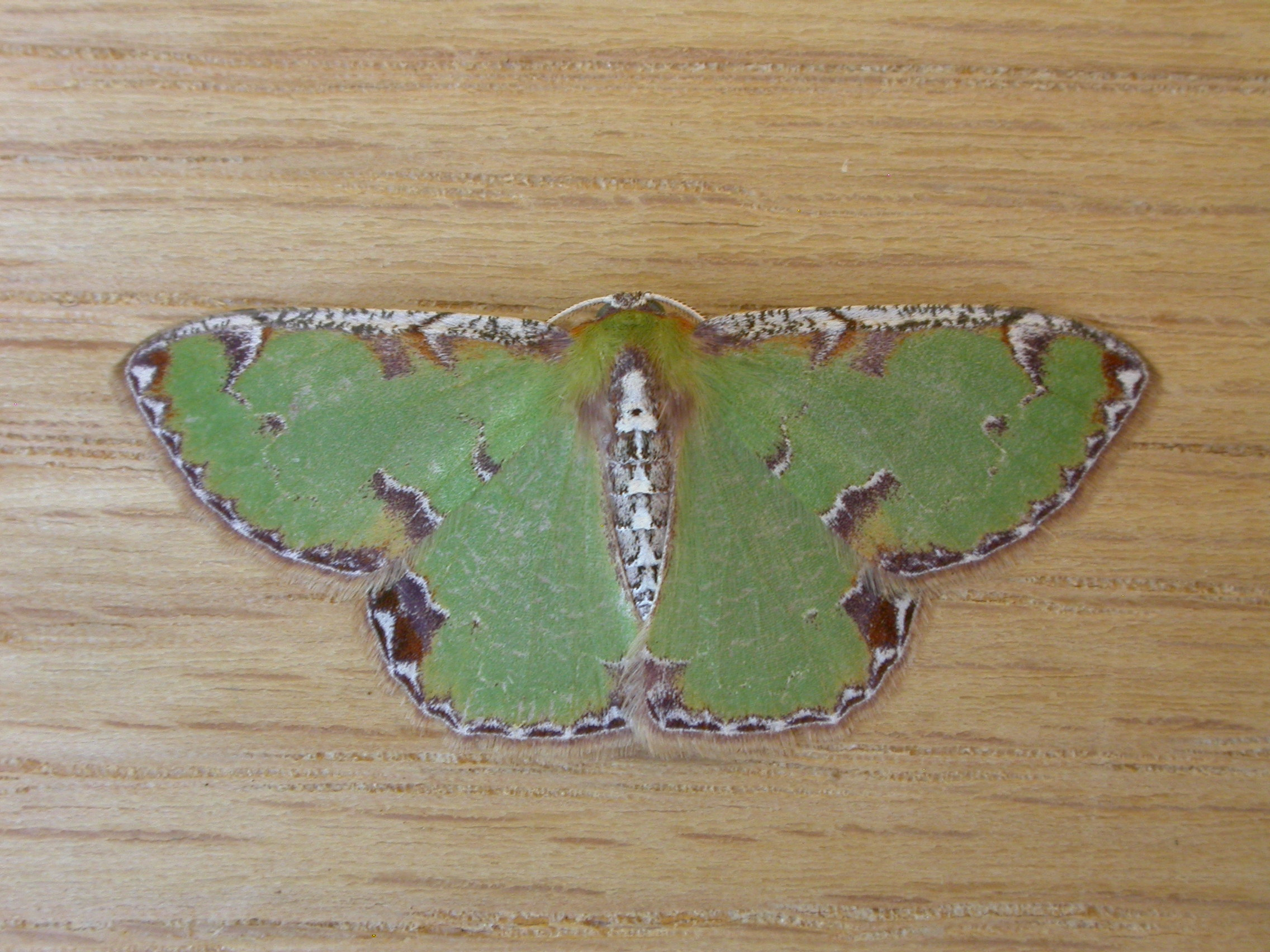

Scientific classification
- Kingdom: Animalia
- Phylum: Arthropoda
- Class: Insecta
- Order: Lepidoptera
- Family: Geometridae
- Genus: Eucyclodes; Warren, 1894

Synonyms
- Anisogamia Warren, 1896; Anisozyga Prout, 1911; Chloromachia Warren, 1897; Chlorostrota Warren, 1897; Felicia Thierry-Mieg, 1915; Galactochlora Warren, 1907; Lophomachia Prout, 1912; Ochrognesia Warren, 1894; Osteosema Warren, 1894

= Eucyclodes =

Genus of moths

Eucyclodes is a genus of moths in the family Geometridae. According to the Catalogue of Life as of March 2017, only E. buprestaria is included in the genus. Other species are categorized into Chloromachia.

== Species ==
- Chloromachia albiceps Felder, 1875
- Eucyclodes absona (Warren, 1896) = Anisozyga absona
- Eucyclodes albisparsa (Walker, 1861) = Chloromachia albisparsa
- Eucyclodes aphrias (Meyrick, 1889) = Anisozyga aphrias
- Chloromachia augustaria Oberthür, 1916
- Chloromachia aureofulva Warren, 1897
- Osteosema discata (Prout) - ssp. benguetensis
- Eucyclodes buprestaria (Guenée, 1857)
- Eucyclodes caledonica (Thierry-Mieg, 1915)
- Eucyclodes callisticta (Turner, 1904)
- Eucyclodes charma (Prout, 1917)
- Eucyclodes concinnata Pagenstecher, 1888
- Eucyclodes difficta (Walker, 1861)
- Eucyclodes discipennata (Walker, 1861)
- Eucyclodes divapala (Walker, 1861)
- Eucyclodes erotyla Turner, 1910
- Eucyclodes erymnodes Turner, 1910
- Eucyclodes fascinans (Lucas, 1894)
- Eucyclodes gavissima (Walker, 1861) = Anisozyga gavissima
- Eucyclodes goniota (Lower, 1894)
- Chloromachia infracta Wileman, 191?
- Eucyclodes insperata (Walker, 1861)
- Eucyclodes lepta (West)
- Eucyclodes leptocosma (Prout, 1933)
- Eucyclodes lithocrossa (Meyrick, 1889)
- Eucyclodes metaspila (Walker, 1861)
- Eucyclodes nivestrota (Warren, 1907)
- Eucyclodes picturata (Hampson 1903)
- Eucyclodes pieroides (Walker, 1861)
- Eucyclodes praeampla (Warren, 1897)
- Chloromachia pulchella Warren, 1899
- Eucyclodes rufimargo (Warren, 1897) = Chloromachia rufimargo
- Eucyclodes sanguilineata (Moore, [1868])
- Eucyclodes semialba (Walker, 1861) - ssp. Eucyclodes angiportus
- Eucyclodes speciosa (Lucas, 1890)
- Eucyclodes subvenusta
- Eucyclodes textiloides Holloway, 1996
- Eucyclodes vicaria (Herbulot)
