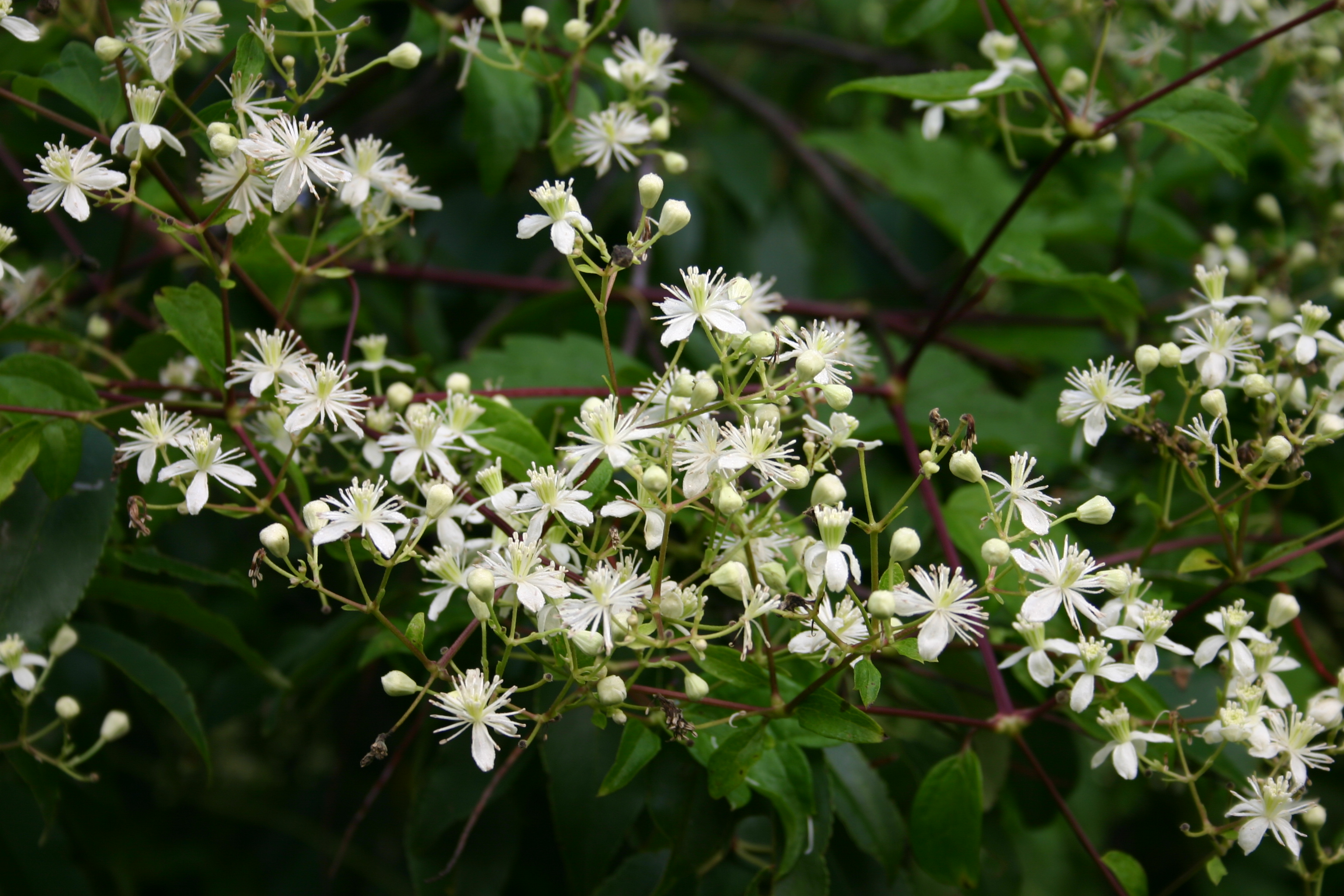
- Close-up of inflorescences

Scientific classification
- Kingdom: Plantae
- Clade: Tracheophytes
- Clade: Angiosperms
- Clade: Eudicots
- Order: Ranunculales
- Family: Ranunculaceae
- Genus: Clematis
- Species: C. virginiana

Binomial name
- Clematis virginiana L.

= Clematis virginiana =

Species of flowering plant in the buttercup family

Clematis virginiana (also known as devil's darning needles, devil's hair, love vine, traveller's joy, virgin's bower, Virginia virgin's bower, wild hops, and woodbine; syn. Clematis virginiana L. var. missouriensis (Rydb.) Palmer & Steyermark ) is a vine of the Ranunculaceae (buttercup family) native to North America from Newfoundland to southern Manitoba down to the Gulf of Mexico. The rationale for some of the common names is unclear, as they include examples normally applied to unrelated plants, including twining parasites (e.g. "devil's hair" for Cuscuta). The name "Love Vine" also is applied to alleged aphrodisiacs, such as Caribbean species of Cassytha, which are unrelated to Clematis, not being in the family Ranunculaceae.

== Description ==
This plant is an aggressively growing vine which can climb to heights of 3–6 m (10–20 ft) by twisting leafstalks. The leaves are opposite and pinnately compound, trifoliate (3 leaflets) that have coarse unequal teeth on the margins. It produces small dull white flowers of width 13 to 19 mm (1/2 to 3/4 in) from July to September that are faintly sweetly fragrant; sometimes dioecious so that there is separate staminate (male) and pistillate (female) plants. The male plants are a little showier in flower and don't bear seed. The dry fruit is an achene with long hair as silvery gray feathery plumes attached in late August into November. It grows on the edges of the woods, moist slopes, fence rows, in thickets and on streambanks. It grows in full sun to light full shade and is very adaptable to many soils from sandy to clay, dry to draining wet, and acid to alkaline with a pH range of 6.0 to 8.5. It has a deep but sparse, fibrous root system that makes it hard to transplant.

== Distribution ==
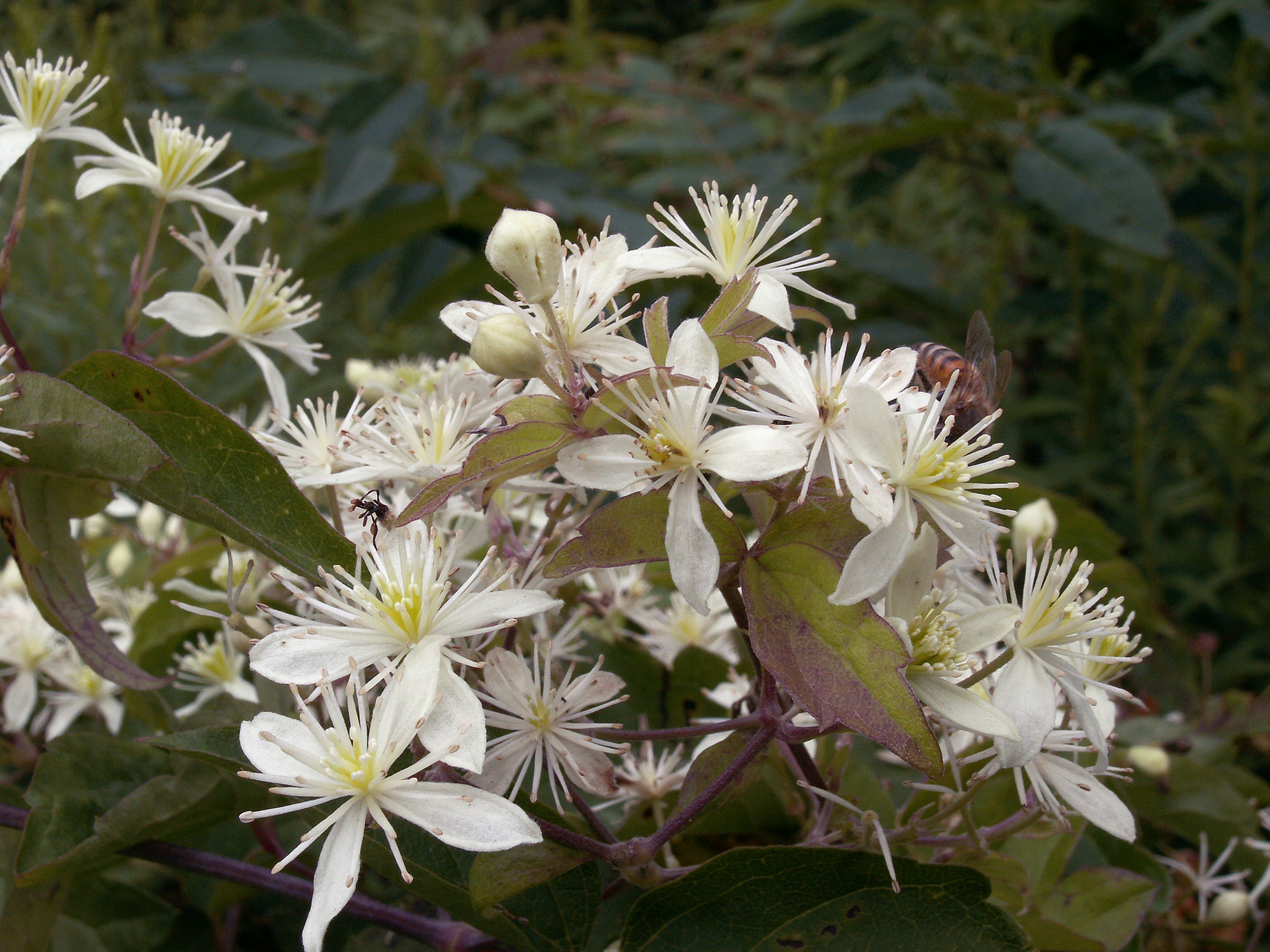

C. virginiana is native to the eastern section of North America, ranging from as far south as the gulf to southern Ontario/Québec; and going as far west as the Missouri River and Great Plains Boundary, reaching into Nebraska and Kansas. It has been observed in Europe and the western United States., but does not appear to be an established threat to ecosystems.

== Cultivation ==
Suited for USDA hardiness zones of 3 to 9, C. virginiana is not commonly planted in gardens and landscapes in most places. However, it is sold by some native plant nurseries and some specialty and large conventional nurseries.

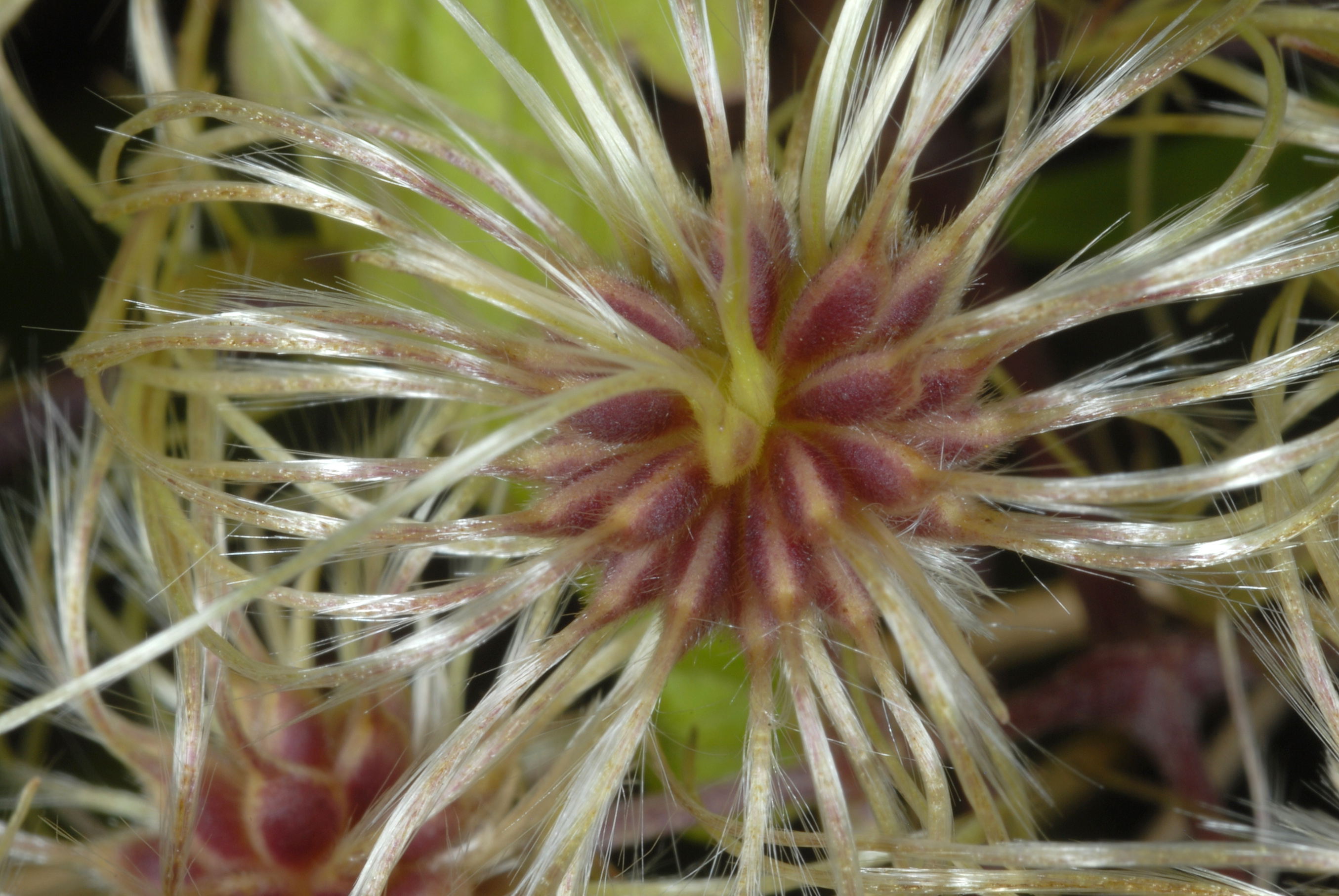
Seedhead; commonly known as "Old man's beard"

What is usually sold at most conventional nursery or garden center is the similar sweet autumn clematis, Clematis terniflora, favored due its heavier leaf coverage, pleasant aroma, and ability to flourish more in shade. Due to its propensity for self-sprouting, the rampant growing sweet autumn clematis quickly can become invasive when introduced to the native habitat of C. virginiana.

== Ecology ==
It is a larval host of the clematis clearwing moth (Alcathoe caudata).
