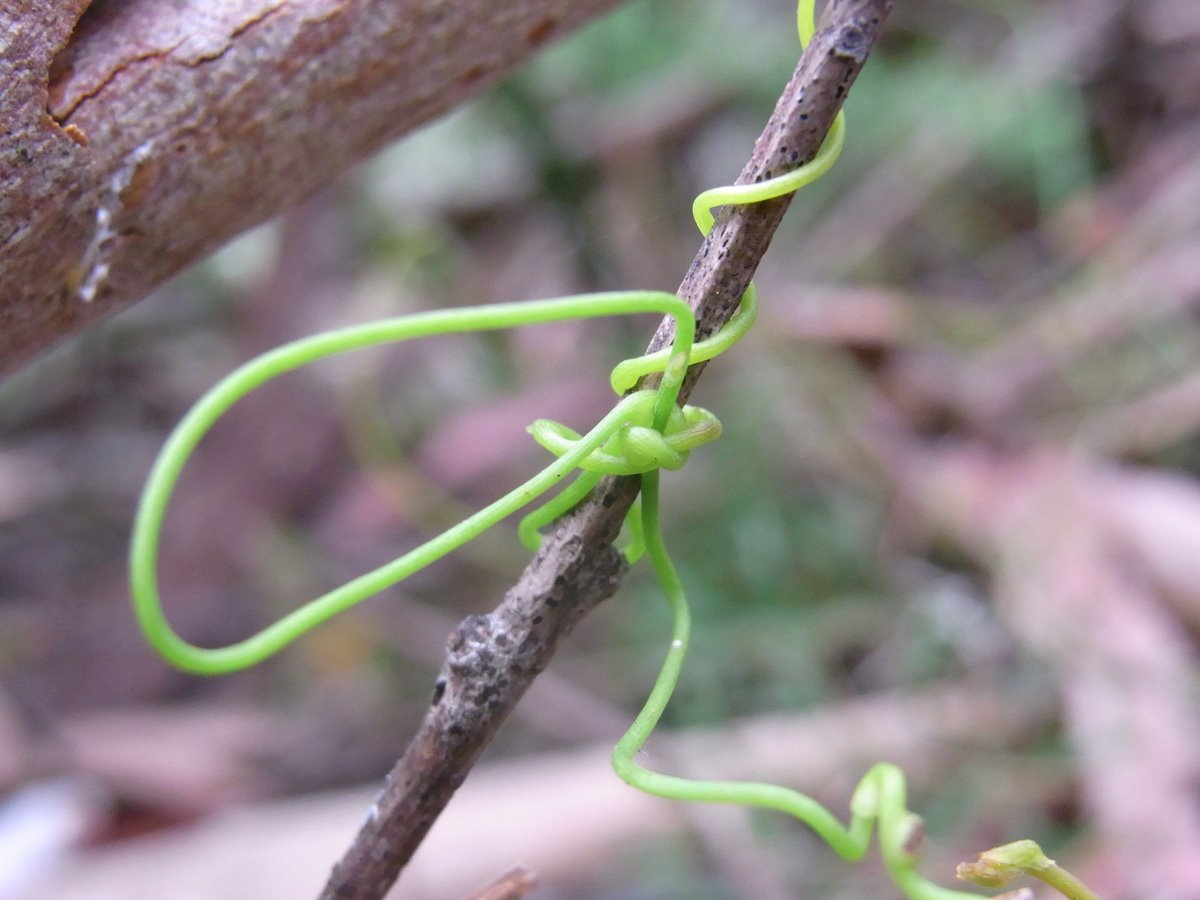
- on a blackbutt twig, Chatswood West, Australia

Scientific classification
- Kingdom: Plantae
- Clade: Tracheophytes
- Clade: Angiosperms
- Clade: Magnoliids
- Order: Laurales
- Family: Lauraceae
- Genus: Cassytha
- Species: C. glabella

Binomial name
- Cassytha glabella R.Br.

= Cassytha glabella =

Slender devil's twine

Species of plant

Cassytha glabella, commonly known as the slender devil's twine, is a common twining plant of the Laurel family, found in many of the moister parts of Australia. A hemi-parasitic climber. The specific epithet glabella is from Latin, referring to the lack of hairs. The fruit are sweet and mucousy to taste. The Devil's Twine (Cassytha pubescens) and Cassytha melantha are similar, but with thicker (and in the case of the former) hairier stems.

In 1810, this species first appeared in scientific literature, in the Prodromus Florae Novae Hollandiae, authored by the prolific Scottish botanist, Robert Brown. Alternate common names include Smooth Cassytha, slender dodder-laurel, tangled dodder-laurel. This and other members of the genus Cassytha are either classified in their own family Cassythaceae or within the laurel family Lauraceae.

Two forms are recognized:

- Cassytha glabella f. dispar, which has more elongated fruit, either pear-shaped (pyriform) or spindle-shaped (fusiform).
- Cassytha glabella f. glabella, which has more oval fruit.

A small twining vine, Cassytha glabella has twining stems which are around 0.5 mm in diameter. The haustoria are less than one millimetre long. The leaves are present in the form of tiny scales. The tiny flowers may form at any time of the year, although peak from November to March in the Sydney region. They appear on a short spike 5 to 7 mm long and are stalkless, yellow or white. The fruit is round; green or yellow, sometimes with red markings, hairless, around 3 to 6 mm in diameter. It is juicy and succulent.

The plant begins life when it germinates from the seed in the ground, the vine growing and flailing about before latching onto nearby vegetation. The root then dies and the plant lives by suckering along the stems and branches of plants. Although it resembles the dodders of the genus Cuscuta, it is unrelated.
