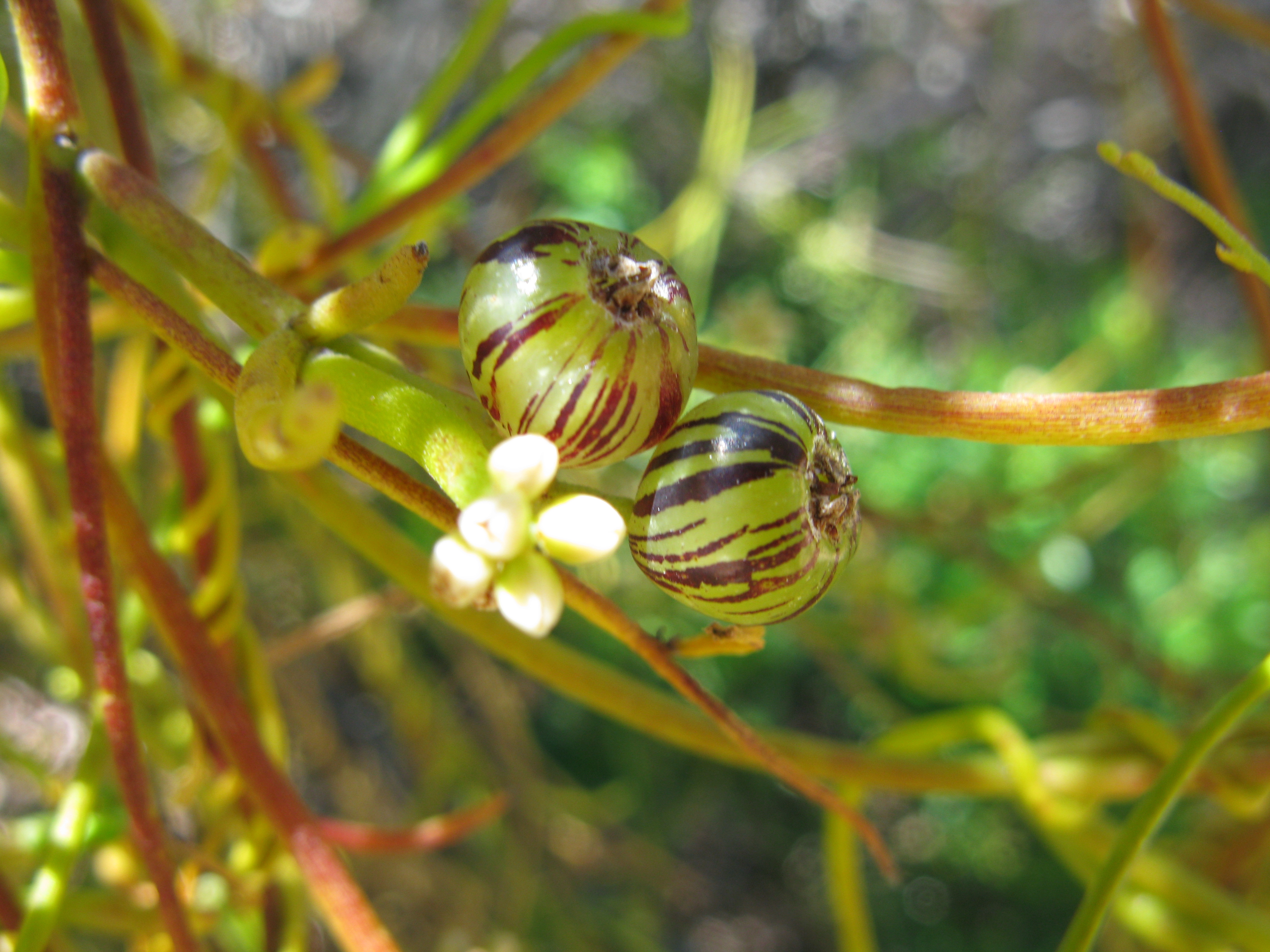

Scientific classification
- Kingdom: Plantae
- Clade: Tracheophytes
- Clade: Angiosperms
- Clade: Magnoliids
- Order: Laurales
- Family: Lauraceae
- Genus: Cassytha
- Species: C. melantha

Binomial name
- Cassytha melantha R.Br.

= Cassytha melantha =

Species of plant

Cassytha melantha is a parasitic vine. Common names include coarse dodder-laurel and large dodder-laurel. The fruits are about 10–15 millimetres (0.39–0.59 in) in diameter and are green, drying to black. These are edible and are harvested in the wild.

The species occurs in the states of Western Australia, South Australia, Tasmania, Victoria and New South Wales in Australia.

The name has sometimes been misapplied to Cassytha filiformis.
