= Eucyclodes subvenusta =

Scientific classification
- Kingdom: Animalia
- Phylum: Arthropoda
- Clade: Pancrustacea
- Class: Insecta
- Order: Lepidoptera
- Family: Geometridae
- Genus: Eucyclodes
- Species: E. subvenusta

Binomial name
- Eucyclodes subvenusta (Warren, 1899)

Species of moth

Eucyclodes subvenusta is a moth in the genus Eucyclodes native to New Guinea.

== Appearance ==
It is a green moth with fringed ends. In females it has brown at the ends and some white giving back into the green. In males the wings are white speckled going from large to small rectangular in the green.
