= Eucyclodes divapala =

Scientific classification
- Kingdom: Animalia
- Phylum: Arthropoda
- Class: Insecta
- Order: Lepidoptera
- Family: Geometridae
- Genus: Eucyclodes
- Species: E. divapala

Binomial name
- Eucyclodes divapala (Walker, 1861)

Synonyms
- Chloromachia divapala Walker, 1861; Comibaena divapala Walker, 1861

Species of moth

Eucyclodes divapala is a moth of the family Geometridae first described by Francis Walker in 1861.

== Distribution ==
It is found in Sri Lanka, as well as Taiwan.

== Description ==
The caterpillar is olive green. Its thoracic and posterior segments are purplish brown. It is known to feed on Myrtus species. The pupa is greenish but speckled with purplish brown.
