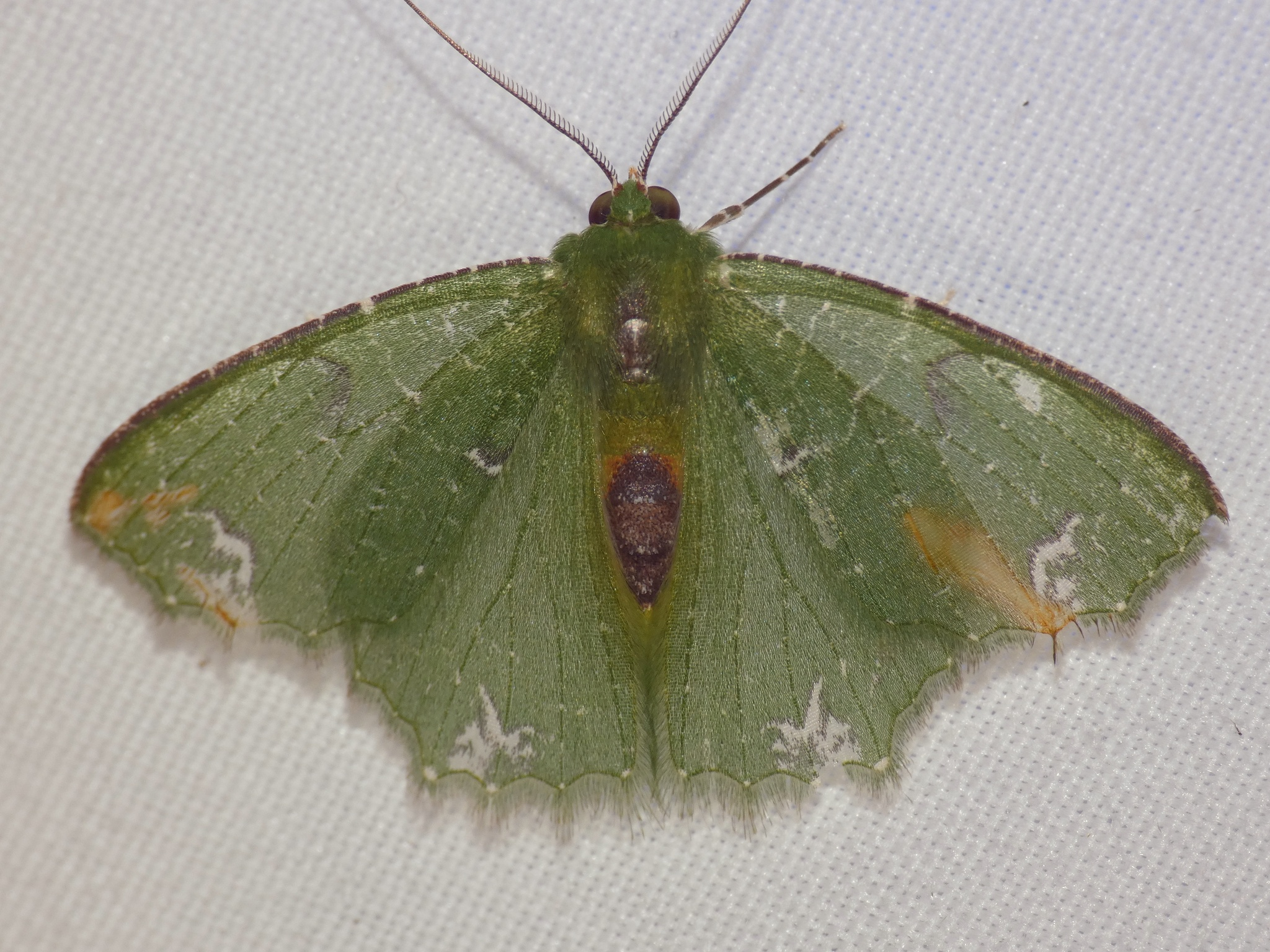

Scientific classification
- Kingdom: Animalia
- Phylum: Arthropoda
- Clade: Pancrustacea
- Class: Insecta
- Order: Lepidoptera
- Family: Geometridae
- Genus: Eucyclodes
- Species: E. goniota

Binomial name
- Eucyclodes goniota (Lower, 1894)

= Eucyclodes goniota =

Species of moth

Eucyclodes goniota is a moth in the genus Eucyclodes native to Australia.

== Appearance ==
It has two different patterns. Both are jade green in appearance. The male has small white c like patterns on their wing edges. The female has little whitish grey fringes at the end of their wing.

== Specimens ==
There are many specimens of this species that have been collected.

== Status ==
This species is common in but endemic to Australia.
