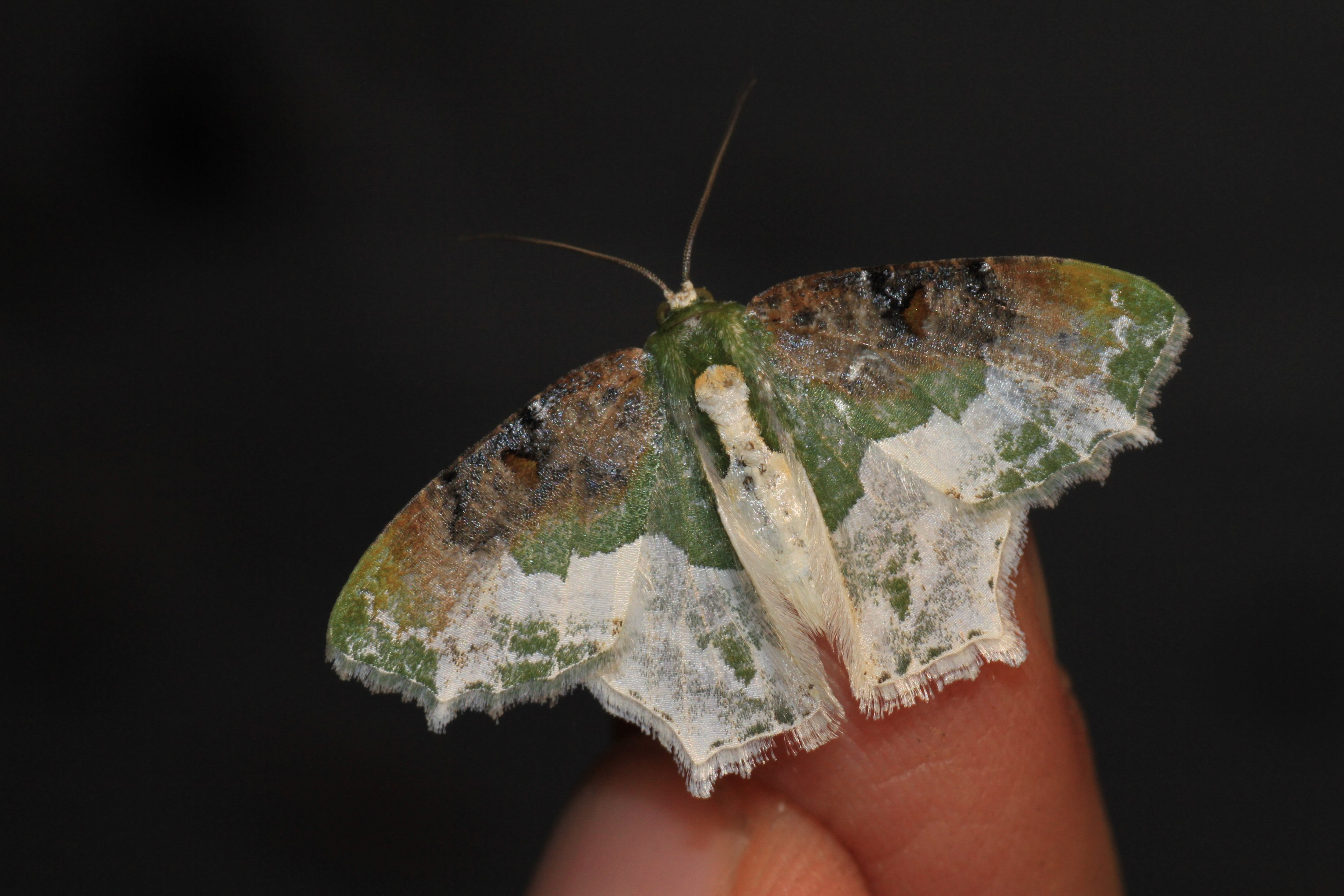

Scientific classification
- Kingdom: Animalia
- Phylum: Arthropoda
- Class: Insecta
- Order: Lepidoptera
- Family: Geometridae
- Genus: Eucyclodes
- Species: E. semialba

Binomial name
- Eucyclodes semialba (Walker, 1861)

Synonyms
- Lophomachia semialba Walker, 1861; Thalera semialba Walker, 1861; Chloromachia semialba viridior Prout, 1916

= Eucyclodes semialba =

Species of moth

Eucyclodes semialba is a moth of the family Geometridae first described by Francis Walker in 1861. It is found in Sri Lanka, the north-east Himalayas of India, Myanmar and Sundaland.

== Description ==
The inner area of the wings is greenish, whereas the outer area is whitish. A conspicuous submarginal black spot is found centrally in the ventral side. The caterpillar is olive green with brown speckles. Anterior and posterior segments pale purplish brown. A double brown line is found dorsally. Pupa greenish with minute purplish-brown speckles. The host plant of the caterpillar is Loranthus.

== Subspecies ==
Three subspecies are recognized.

- Eucyclodes semialba angiportus Prout, 1932
- Eucyclodes semialba viridior Prout, 1916 - Sri Lanka
- Eucyclodes semialba semialba Walker, 1861 - Taiwan
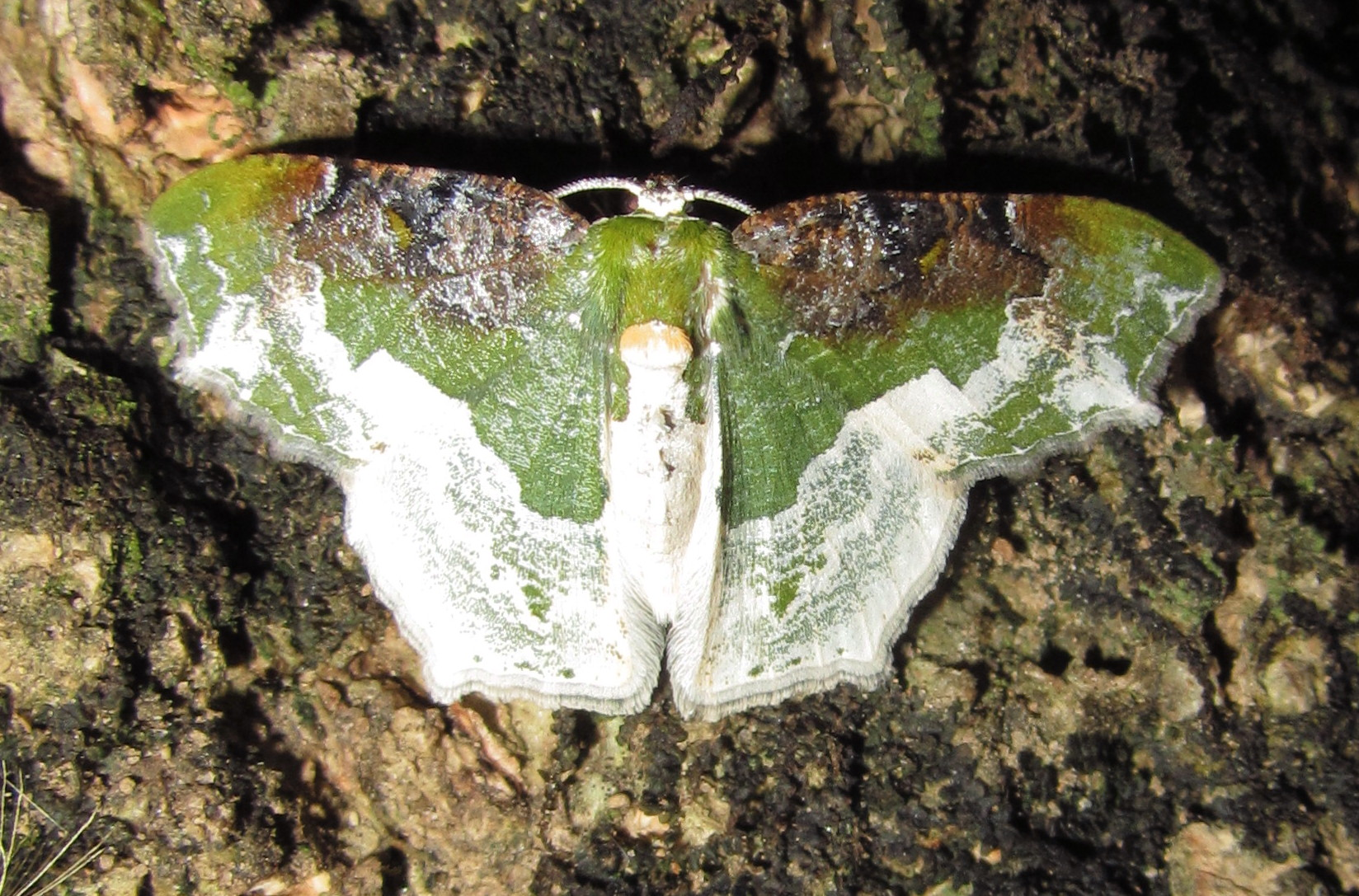
