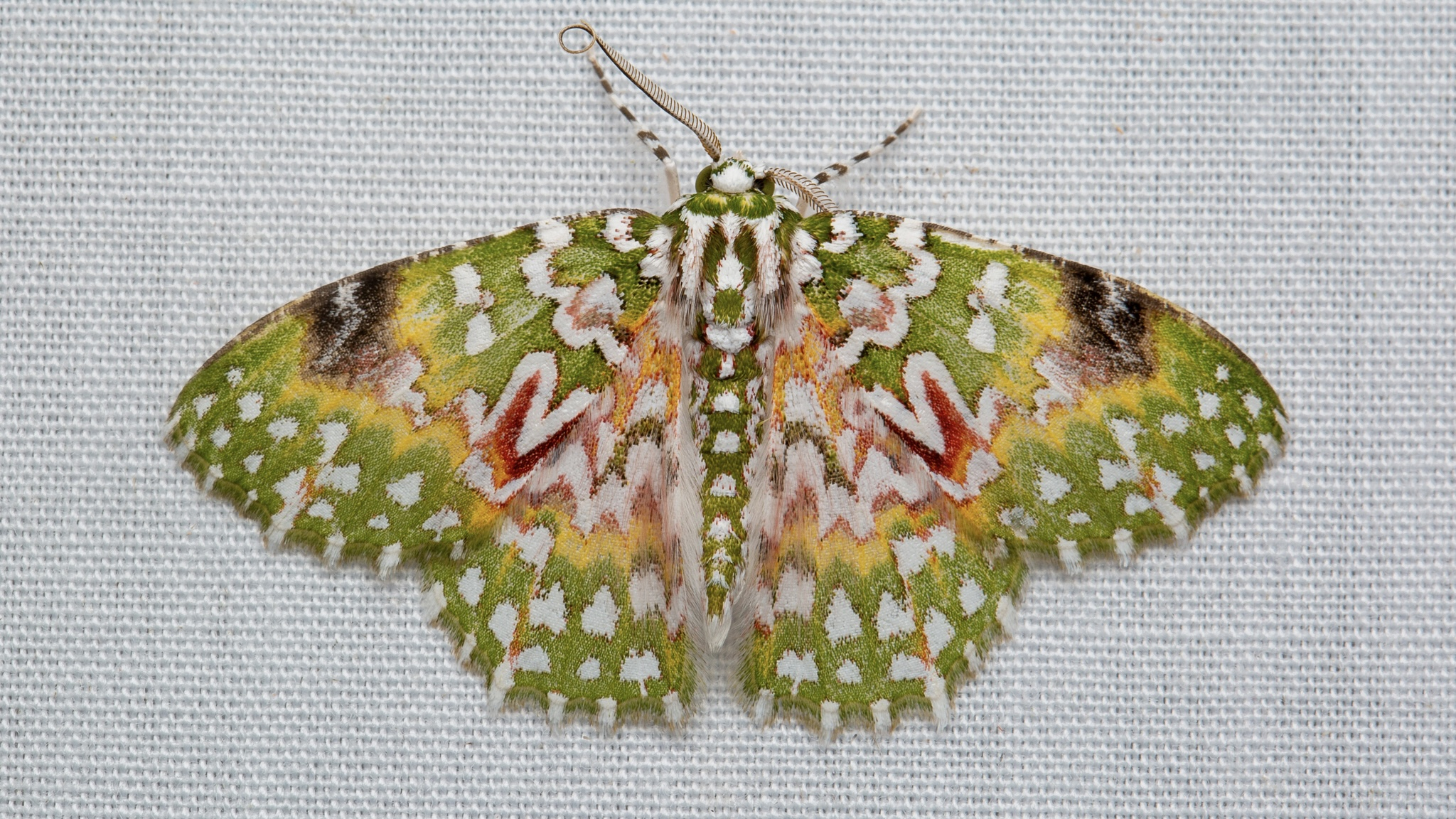

Scientific classification
- Kingdom: Animalia
- Phylum: Arthropoda
- Class: Insecta
- Order: Lepidoptera
- Family: Geometridae
- Genus: Eucyclodes
- Species: E. gavissima

Binomial name
- Eucyclodes gavissima (Walker, 1861)

Synonyms
- Comibaena gavissima Walker, 1861; Anisozyga gavissima

= Eucyclodes gavissima =

Species of moth

Eucyclodes gavissima, the Oriental orange banded green geometer moth, is a species of moth of the family Geometridae described by Francis Walker in 1861. It is found in the Indian subregion, Sri Lanka, Bhutan, western China, Taiwan, Vietnam, Sumatra and Borneo.

== Description ==
The wingspan of the male is 34 mm. Hindwings with veins 3, 4 and 6, 7 stalked. Forewings with vein 11 from the cell. Forewings with veins 3, 4 from angle of cell. Hind tibia of male with two spur pairs, and dilated with a fold containing a tuft of long hair. Antennae of male bipectinate (comb like on both sides). It is generally a yellowish-green moth. Palpi and vertex of head whitish. Thorax and abdomen marked with white. Wings with white markings. Forewings with basal and sub-basal spots. Waved antemedial band with spot found on its inner edge below cell. Two spots at end of cell. There is a waved postmedial band dentate on inner area and merging in to a large purplish-fuscous patch on costal area. Two sub-marginal and a marginal series of spots. Hindwings with white spots on the basal area. A highly waved medial band and postmedial, sub-marginal, and marginal white spot series present. Ventral side whitish with black-brown patches near apex of each wing, which is largest found on hindwings.

The wingspan of the female is 40 mm. The female has some crimson specks on the thorax and abdomen. Wings with rufous edges to the white markings. Forewings with rufous edges to the white markings. Forewings with a crimson patch beyond the postmedial line on inner area. Hindwings with yellowish and crimson basal area.

Larva mottled light brown, brown, white and tinged irregularly rufous. The larvae feed on the flowers of Memecylon species. Pupa bone colored, suffused pink and speckled with black.

== Subspecies ==
- Eucyclodes gavissima gavissima
- Eucyclodes gavissima aphrodite (Prout, 1933) (western China, Taiwan)
