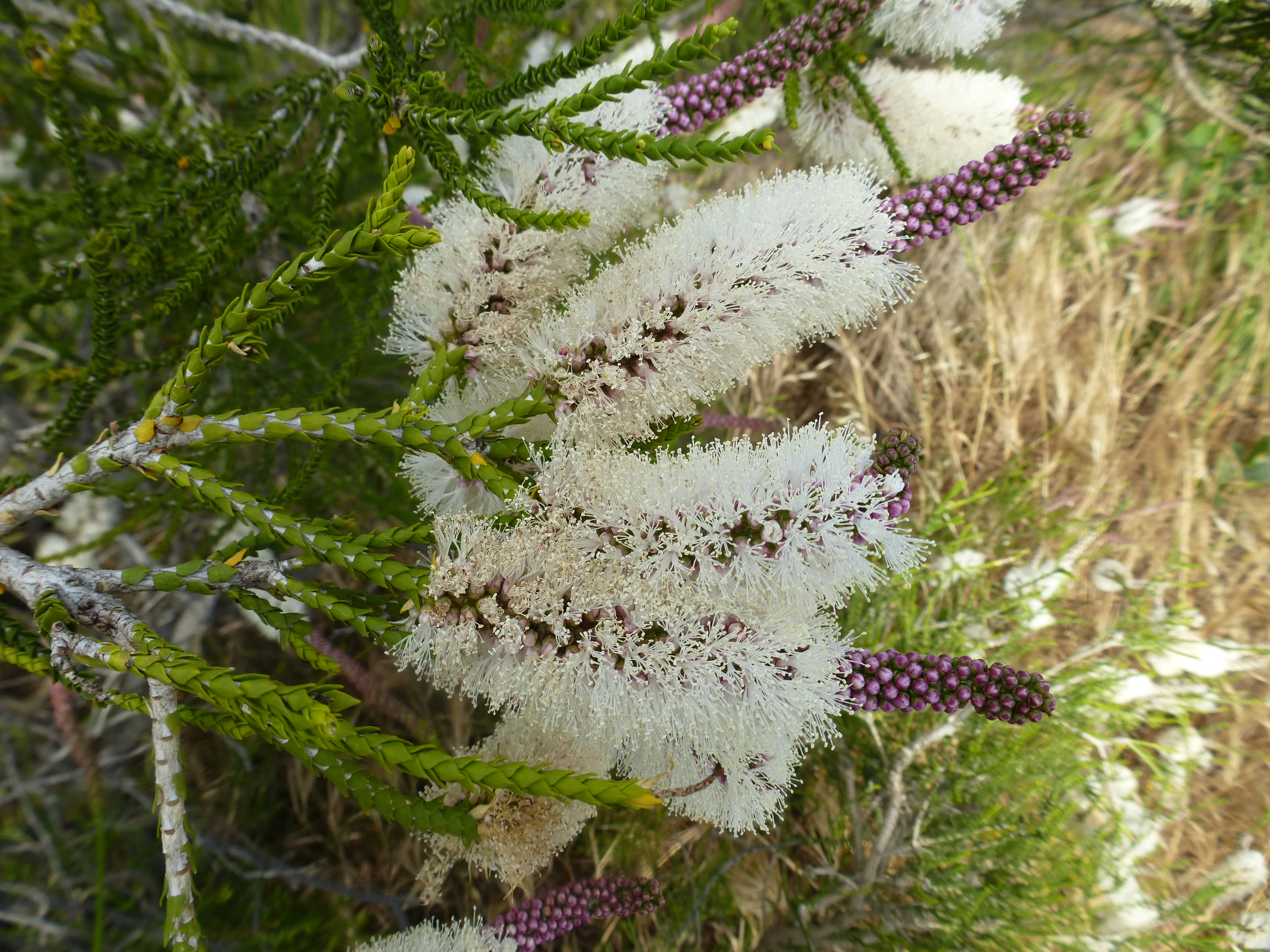
- Melaleuca huegelii

Conservation status
- Least Concern (IUCN 3.1)

Scientific classification
- Kingdom: Plantae
- Clade: Embryophytes
- Clade: Tracheophytes
- Clade: Spermatophytes
- Clade: Angiosperms
- Clade: Eudicots
- Clade: Rosids
- Order: Myrtales
- Family: Myrtaceae
- Genus: Melaleuca
- Species: M. huegelii

Binomial name
- Melaleuca huegelii Endl.

Synonyms
- Myrtoleucodendron huegelii (Endl.) Kuntze

= Melaleuca huegelii =

Chenille honey-myrtle

Species of flowering plant

Melaleuca huegelii, commonly known as chenille honey-myrtle, is a plant in the myrtle family, Myrtaceae and is endemic to the south-west coastal areas of Western Australia. It has small, almost scale-like leaves and flower spikes sometimes more than 100 millimetres (4 in) long on the ends many of its branches.

== Description ==
Melaleuca huegelii is a large shrub, sometimes a small tree up to 5 m (20 ft) tall, with dark-coloured bark and branches that are usually covered with fine, soft hairs, at least when young. Its leaves are 1.3–10 mm (0.05–0.4 in) long, 1–2.5 mm (0.04–0.1 in) wide, roughly egg-shaped and taper to a point.

The flowers are white, cream-coloured or a shade of pink and arranged in spikes on the ends of branches which continue to grow after flowering and sometimes also in the upper leaf axils. The spikes are up to 100 mm (4 in) long and sometimes longer, up to 25 mm (1 in) in diameter and contain up to 140 groups of flowers in threes. The petals are 1.5–3 mm (0.06–0.1 in) long and fall off as the flowers age. The stamens are arranged in bundles of five around the flower, with 6 to 13 stamens in each bundle. Flowering occurs between August and January and is followed by fruit which are woody, cup-shaped capsules 2.3–2.8 mm (0.09–0.1 in) long and wide in clusters along the stem.

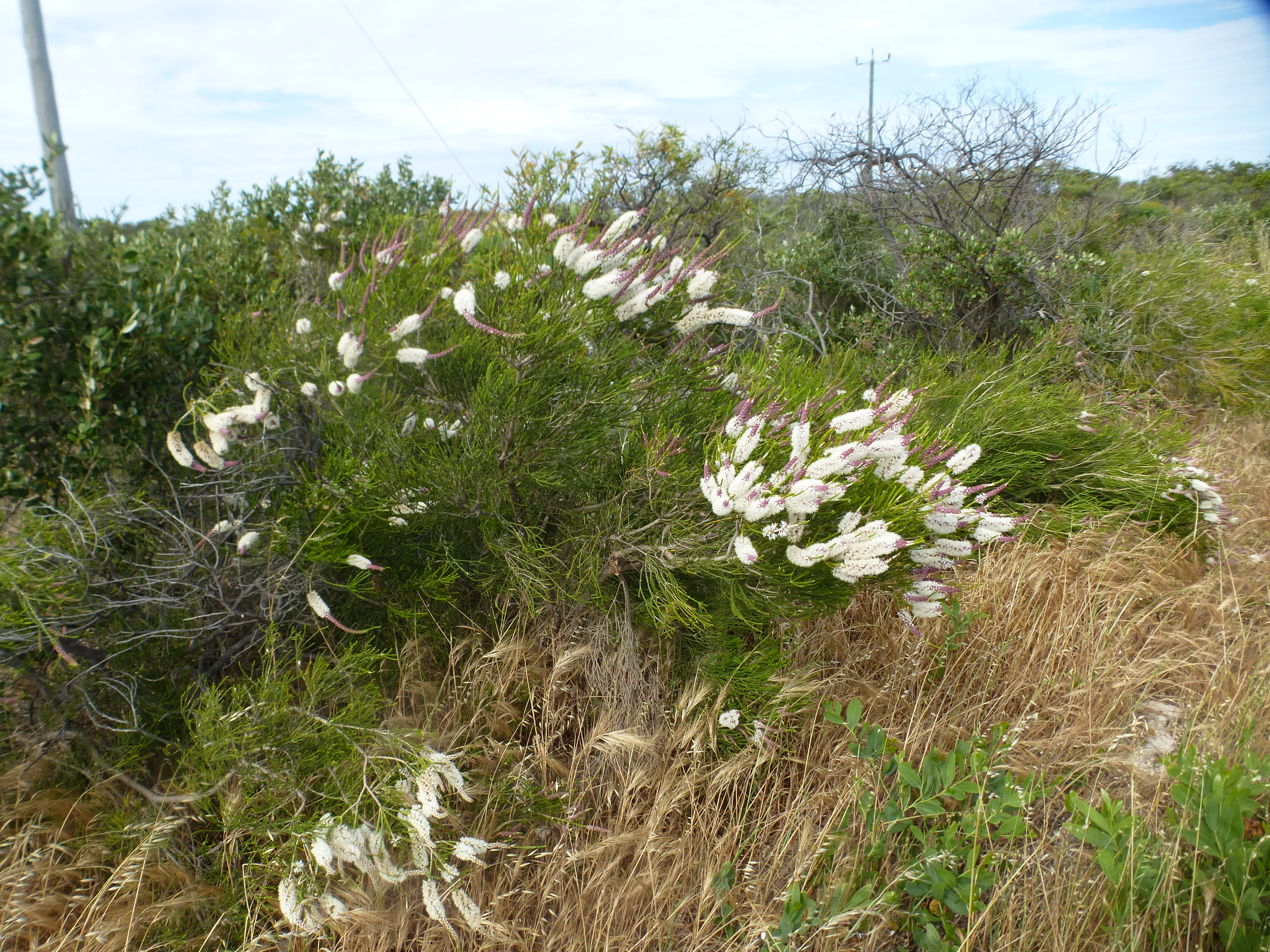
Habit near Ledge Point

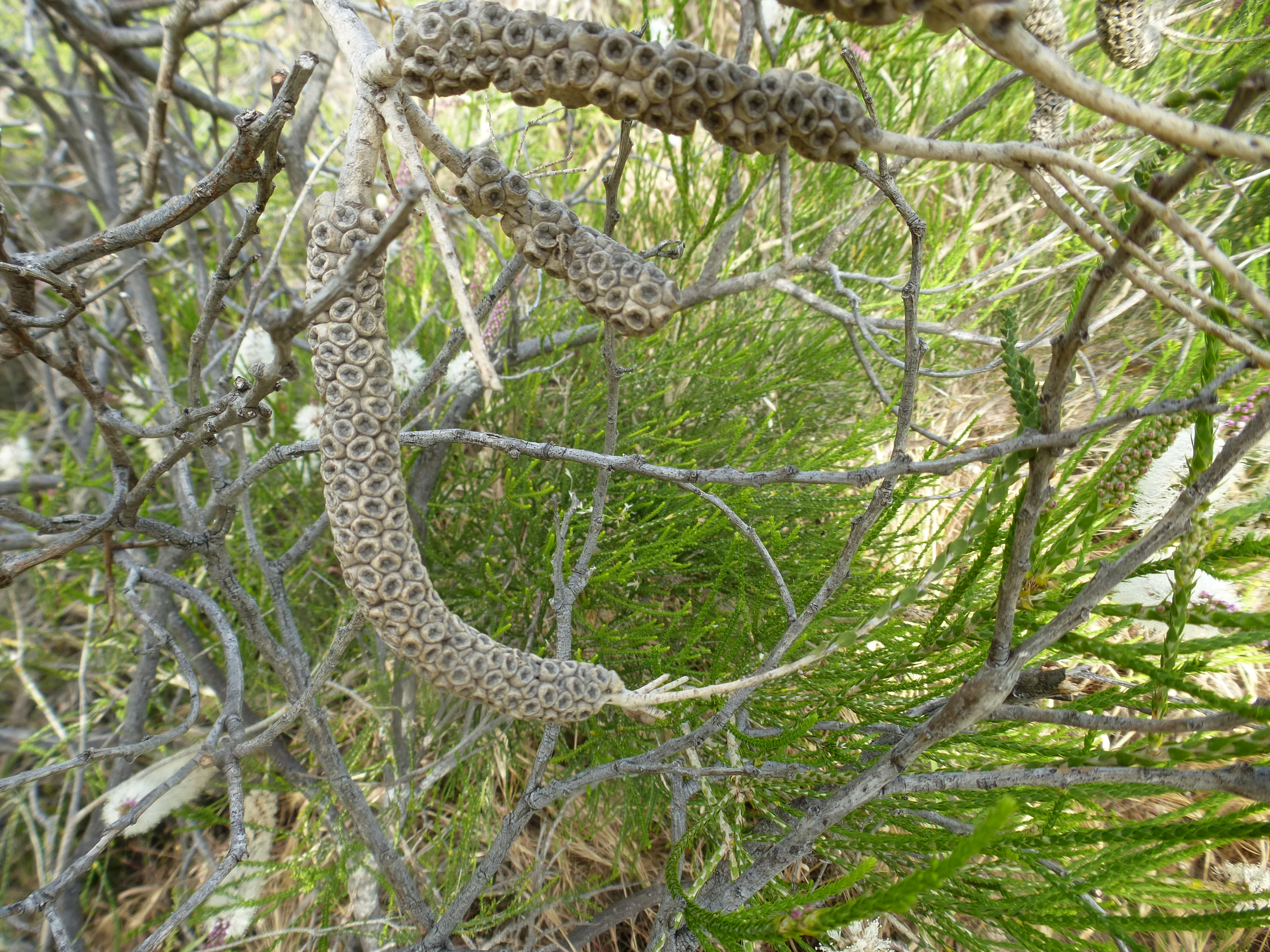
Fruit

== Taxonomy and naming ==
Melaleuca huegelii was first formally described in 1837 by Stephan Endlicher in Enumeratio plantarum quas in Novae Hollandiae ora austro-occidentali ad fluvium Cygnorum et in sinu Regis Georgii collegit Carolus Liber Baro de Hügel. The specific epithet (huegelii) refers to Carl von Huegel, collector of the type specimen, who found the species growing at Fremantle in 1833.

There are two subspecies:

- Melaleuca huegelii Endl. subsp. huegelii occurs from the Walkaway district to the Augusta district in the Geraldton Sandplains, Jarrah Forest, Swan Coastal Plain and Warren biogeographic regions;
- Melaleuca huegelii subsp. pristicensis Barlow occurs in the Shark Bay district in the Yalgoo biogeographical region. The name pristicensis is from the Ancient Greek pristis meaning "shark" in reference to the distribution of the subspecies.

== Distribution and habitat ==
Melaleuca huegelii occurs along the coast of Western Australia from the Shark Bay district to the Augusta district. It occurs in coastal areas on limestone cliffs, dunes and plains.

== Conservation status ==
This species is classified as not threatened by the Government of Western Australia Department of Parks and Wildlife although the subspecies pristicensis is classified as "Priority Three" meaning that it is poorly known and known from only a few locations but is not under imminent threat.
