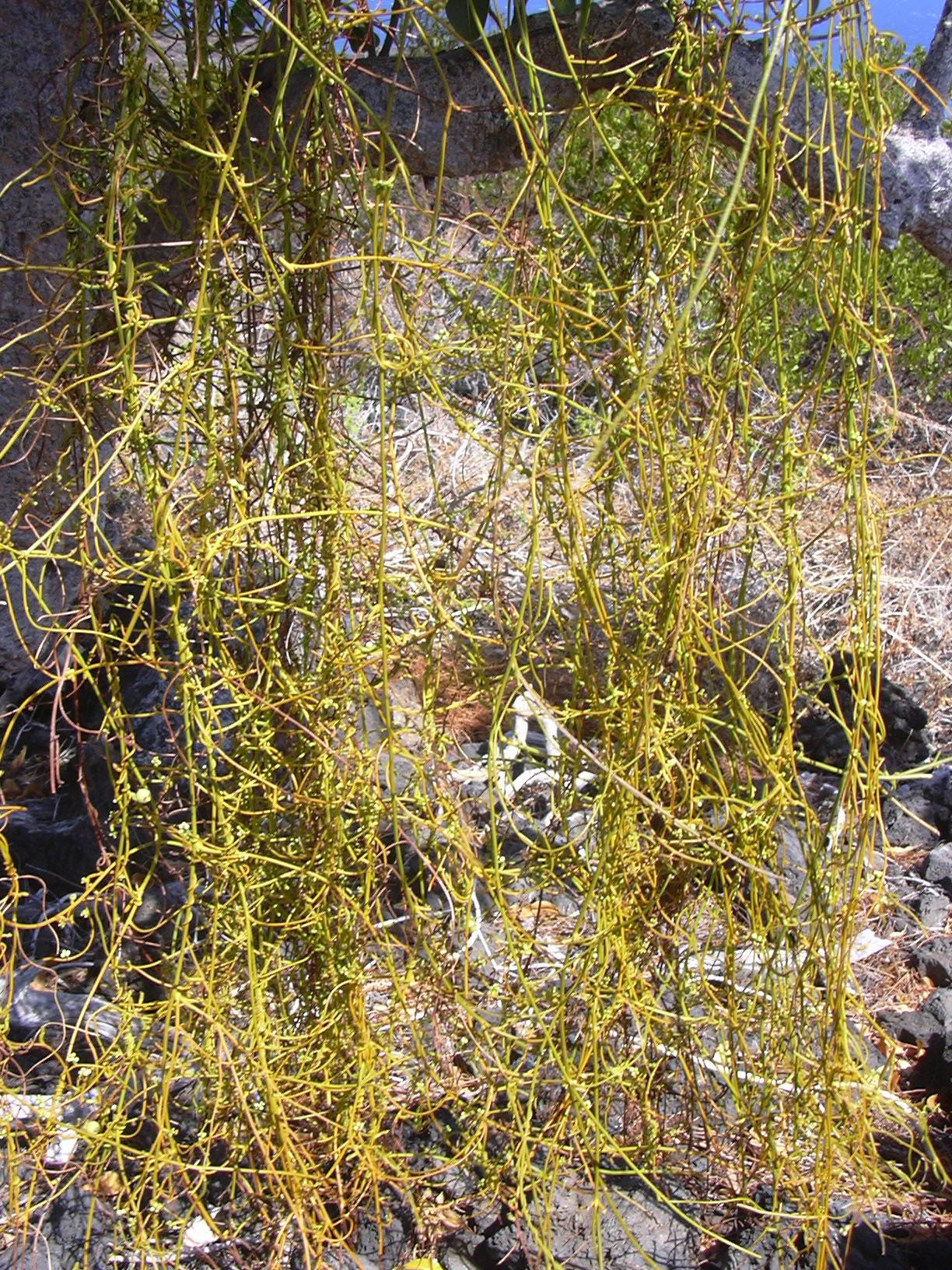
- C. filiformis at Kanaio; Beach, Maui, Hawaii
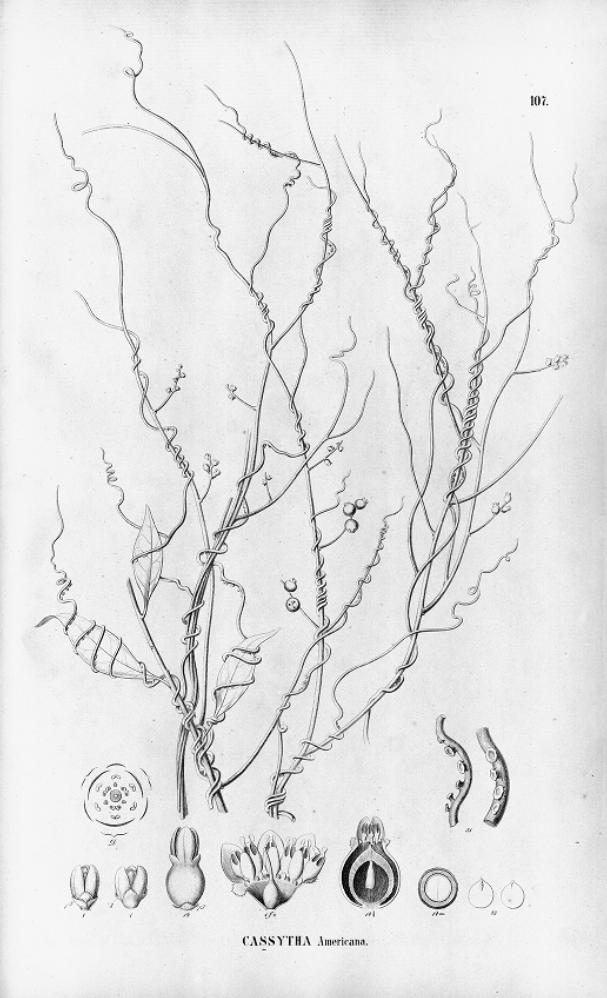

Conservation status
- Apparently Secure (NatureServe)

Scientific classification
- Kingdom: Plantae
- Clade: Embryophytes
- Clade: Tracheophytes
- Clade: Spermatophytes
- Clade: Angiosperms
- Clade: Magnoliids
- Order: Laurales
- Family: Lauraceae
- Genus: Cassytha
- Species: C. filiformis

Binomial name
- Cassytha filiformis L.

Synonyms
- List: Calodium cochinchinense Lour.; Calodium cochinchinensis Lour.; Cassytha americana Nees; Cassytha americana var. brachystachya Meisn.; Cassytha americana var. brasiliensis (Mart. ex Nees) Meisn.; Cassytha americana var. puberula Meisn.; Cassytha aphylla Raeusch.; Cassytha archboldiana C.K.Allen; Cassytha brasiliensis Mart. ex Nees; Cassytha corniculata Burm.f.; Cuscuta reflexa Roxb.; Cassytha cuscutiformis F. Muell.; Cassytha dissitiflora Meisn.; Cassytha filiformis var. pseudopubescens Domin; Cassytha filiformis f. pycnantha Domin; Cassytha guineensis Schumach. & Thonn.; Cassytha lifuensis Guillaumin; Cassytha macrocarpa Guillaumin; Cassytha novoguineensis Kaneh. & Hatus.; Cassytha paradoxae Proctor; Cassytha senegalensis A.Chev.; Cassytha timoriensis Gand.; Cassytha zeylanica Gaertn.; Rumputris fasciculata Raf.; Spironema aphylla Raf.; Volutella aphylla Forssk.

= Cassytha filiformis =

Species of flowering plant

Cassytha filiformis or love-vine is an orangish, wiry, parasitic vine in the family Lauraceae. It is found in coastal forests of warm tropical regions worldwide including the Americas, Indomalaya, Australasia, Polynesia and tropical Africa.

It is an obligate parasite, meaning it cannot complete its life-cycle without another host plant. Research in Florida (in southeast United States) has found that love-vine inhibits gall wasps by attacking the galls (small growths on plants) that the wasps create for their young.

== Description ==
=== Vines ===
Cassytha filiformis is a twining vine with yellow or orange to pale green hollow stems with a length between 3–8 metres long. The stems attach to host plants by growing shoots from the base of its root, they have haustoria that fold inside the hosts' phloem and xylem membranes to absorb water and nutrients. The young shoots are slightly thicker and slightly darker than the unrelated dodder, but otherwise remarkably similar.

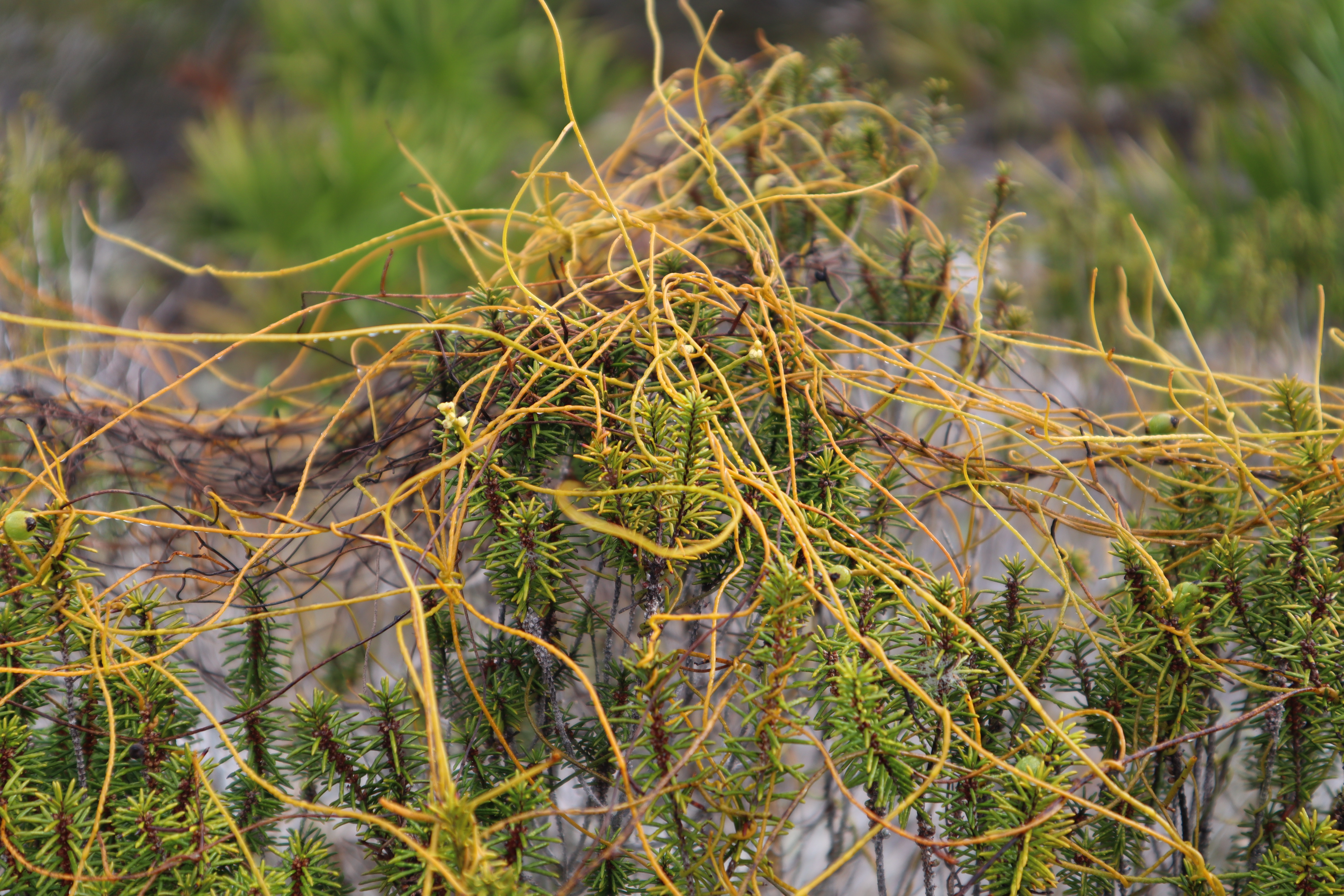
Clump of C. filiformis on Florida Rosemary, southwest Florida.

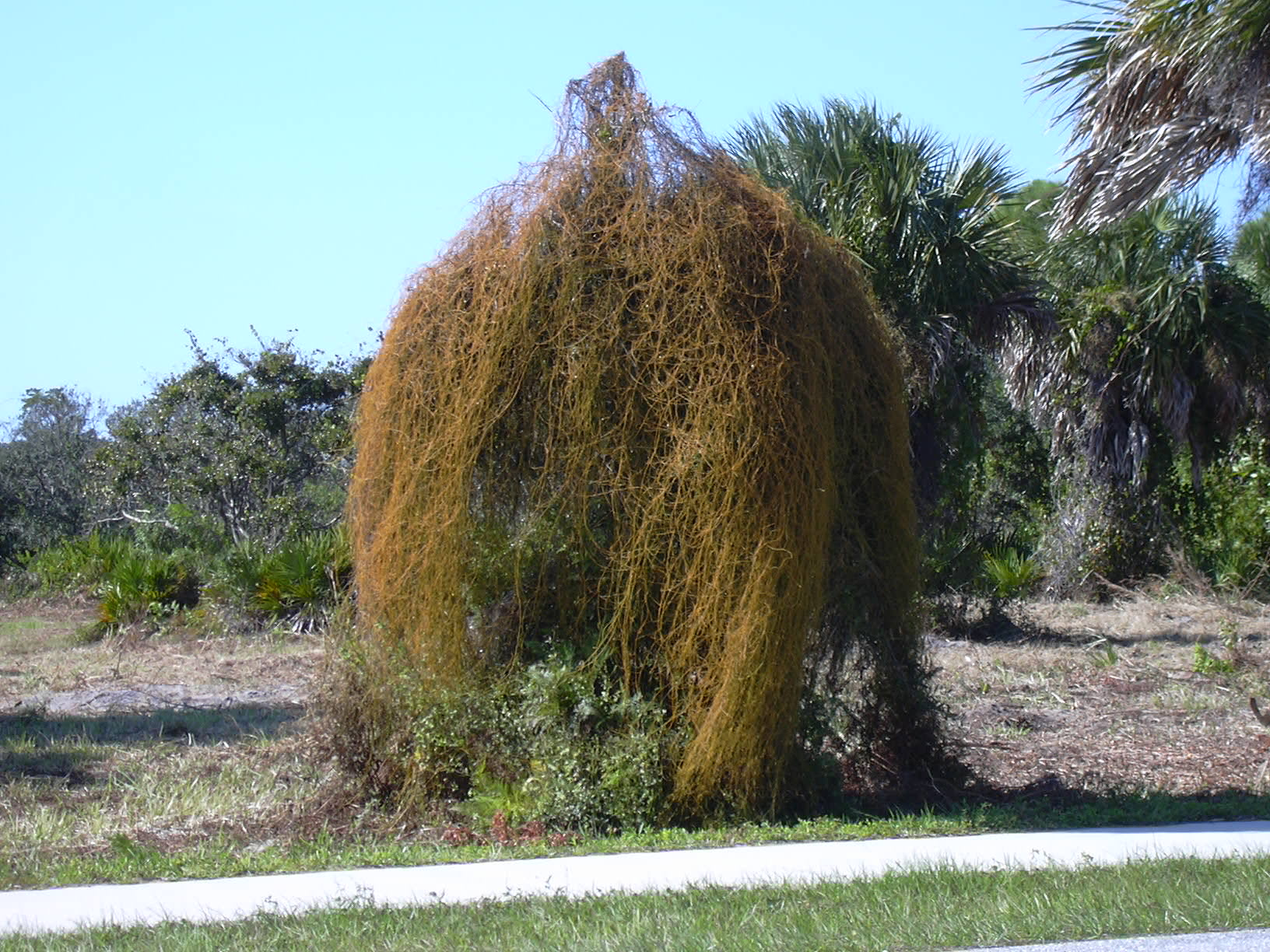
C. filiformis covering a tree,
Caspersen Beach, west Florida

Leaves are reduced to scales about 1 mm long and can be seen near stem ends.

=== Flowers and fruit ===
Flowers are borne in spikes 1–2 cm long from short stalks or sometimes solitary. There are six curved inward tepals made of 3 outer oval ones 1 mm long and three inner ones 2.5 mm long. Each one has smooth (glabrous) and broad stamens with short pointy ends forming into a beak shape.

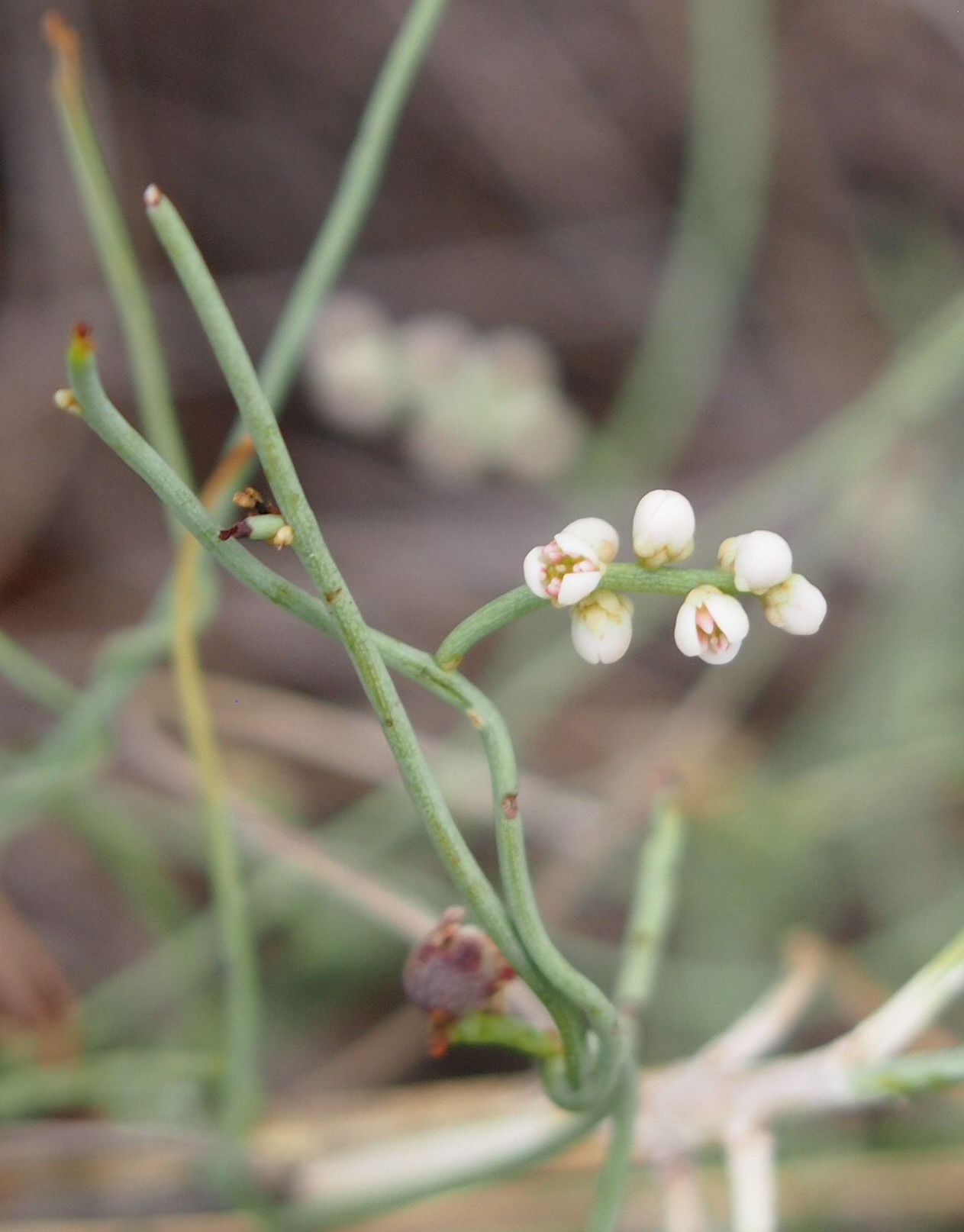
C. filiformis flowers

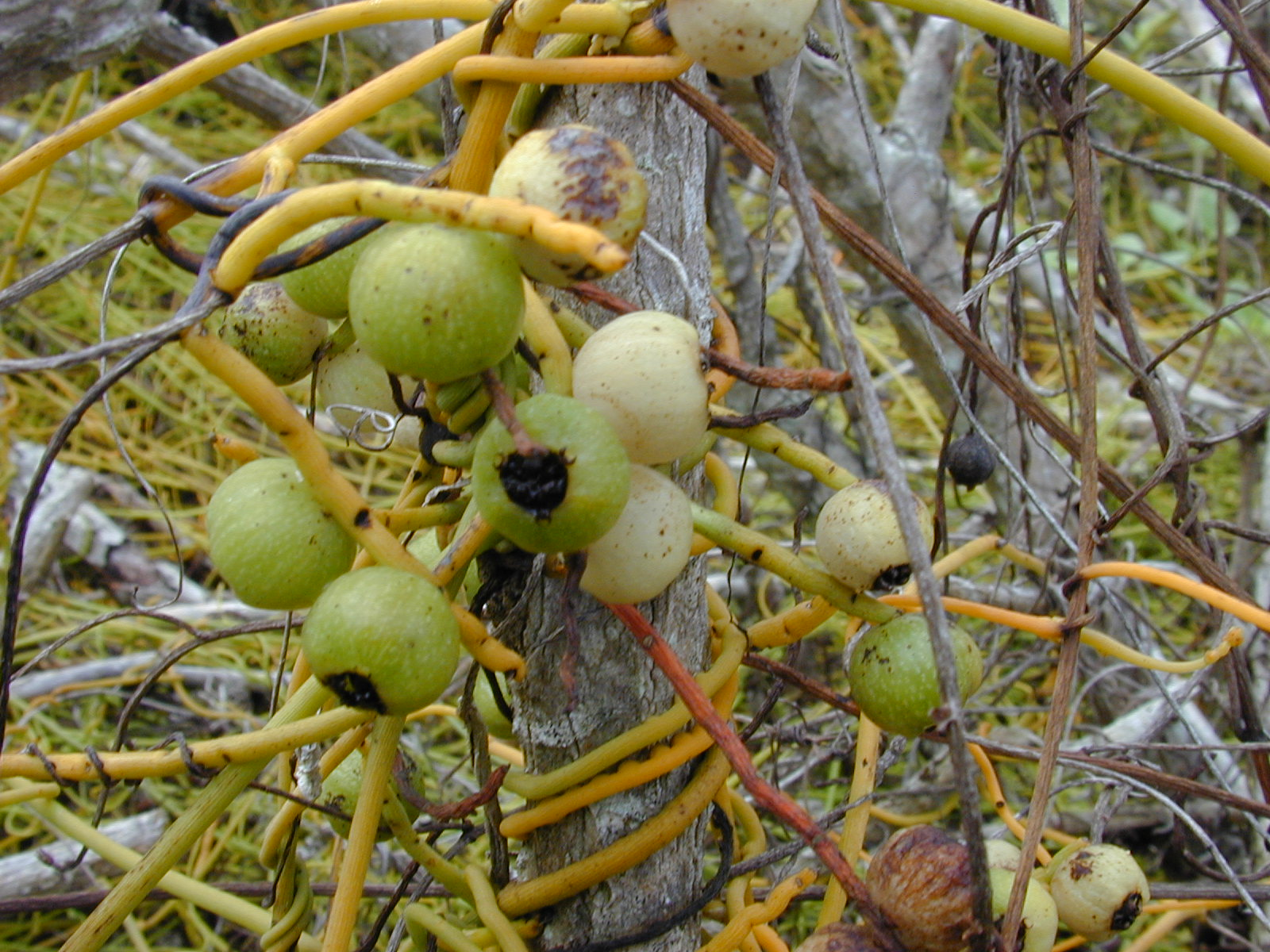
C. filiformis fruit, Hawaii

Fruit is a round and green or whitish drupe about 7 mm in diameter. Its juicy flesh is eaten and dispersed by birds.

== Uses and relationship with humans ==
In the Malay Peninsula, the stems are dried and powdered to make a liquid substance to stimulate hair growth.

Pregnant women in Polynesia drink juice from the vines for 4 weeks before their babies' due date to reduce pains giving birth.

In the Caribbean region, it is one of several plants known as "love vine" because it has a reputation as an aphrodisiac.

The 1889 book 'The Useful Native Plants of Australia records that the "This and other species of Cassytha are called 'Dodder-laurel'." The emphatic name of "Devil's guts" is largely used. It frequently connects bushes and trees by cords, and becomes a nuisance to the traveller. "This plant is used by the Brahmins of Southern India for seasoning their buttermilk. (Treasury of Botany?)".

== Gall wasps ==
A 2018 study revealed how a southern Florida subspecies of this widespread species is involved in a newly discovered form of trophic interaction involving gall-forming cynipid wasps. New tendrils will actively seek out galls made by the gall wasp, Belonocnema treatae, on leaves of a host oak tree, Quercus geminata. The findings show that galls attacked by haustoria were associated with a 45% less survival rate for the wasps, suggesting that C. filiformis has an important negative impact on gall wasp survival. In the study, other species of plant and wasp galls are parasitised by this plant in the southern Florida area too.

== Alkaloids ==
Launobine

A norapophine alkaloid contained in Cassytha americana is called Launobine [20497-21-6].
