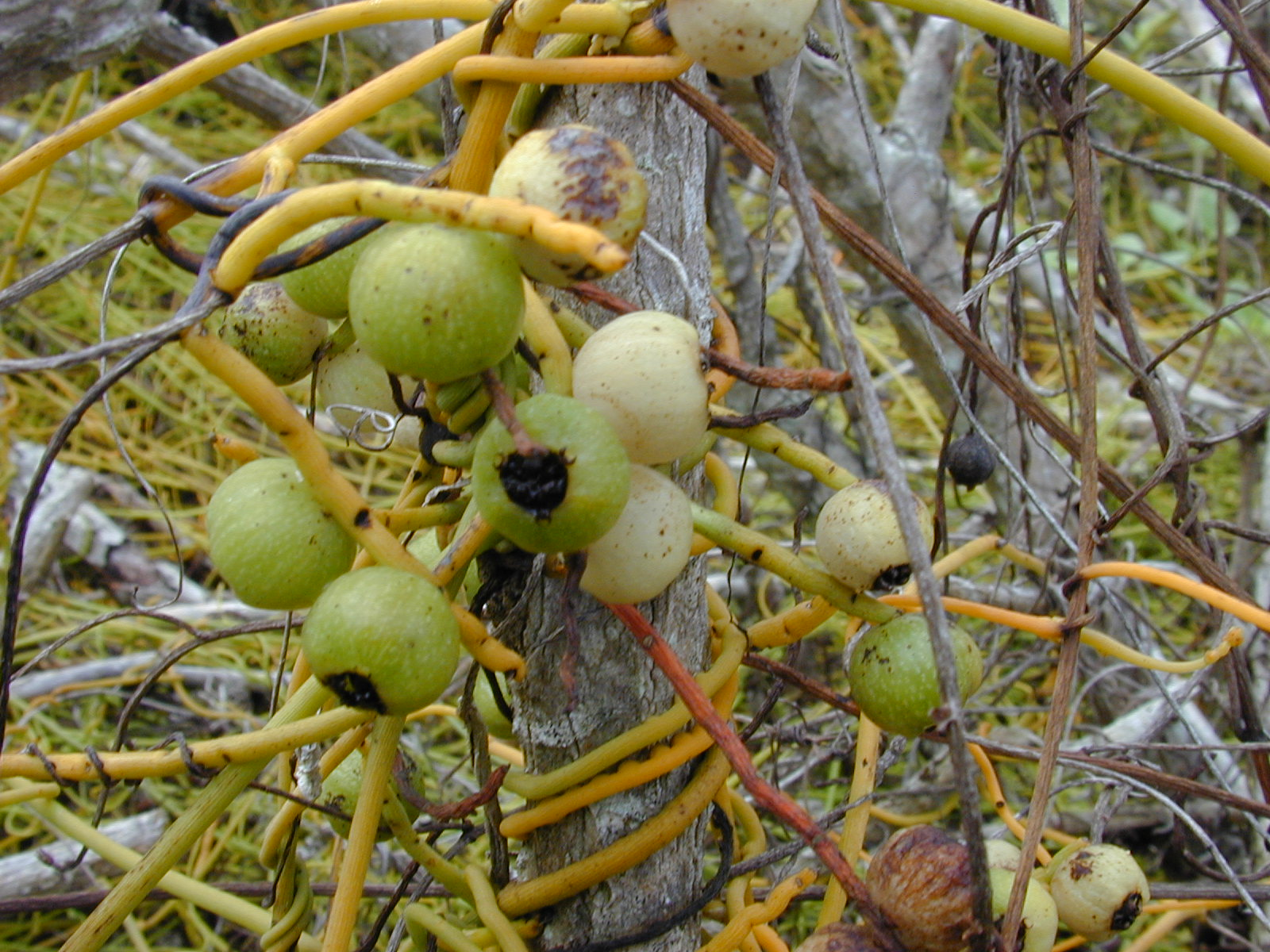
- Cassytha filiformis

Scientific classification
- Kingdom: Plantae
- Clade: Tracheophytes
- Clade: Angiosperms
- Clade: Magnoliids
- Order: Laurales
- Family: Lauraceae
- Genus: Cassytha; L.

Type species
- Cassytha filiformis L.

Species
- See here

Synonyms
- Calodium Lour.; Ozarthris Raf.; Rombut Rumph. ex Adans.; Rumputris Raf.; Spironema Raf.; Volutella Forssk.

= Cassytha =

Genus of flowering plants

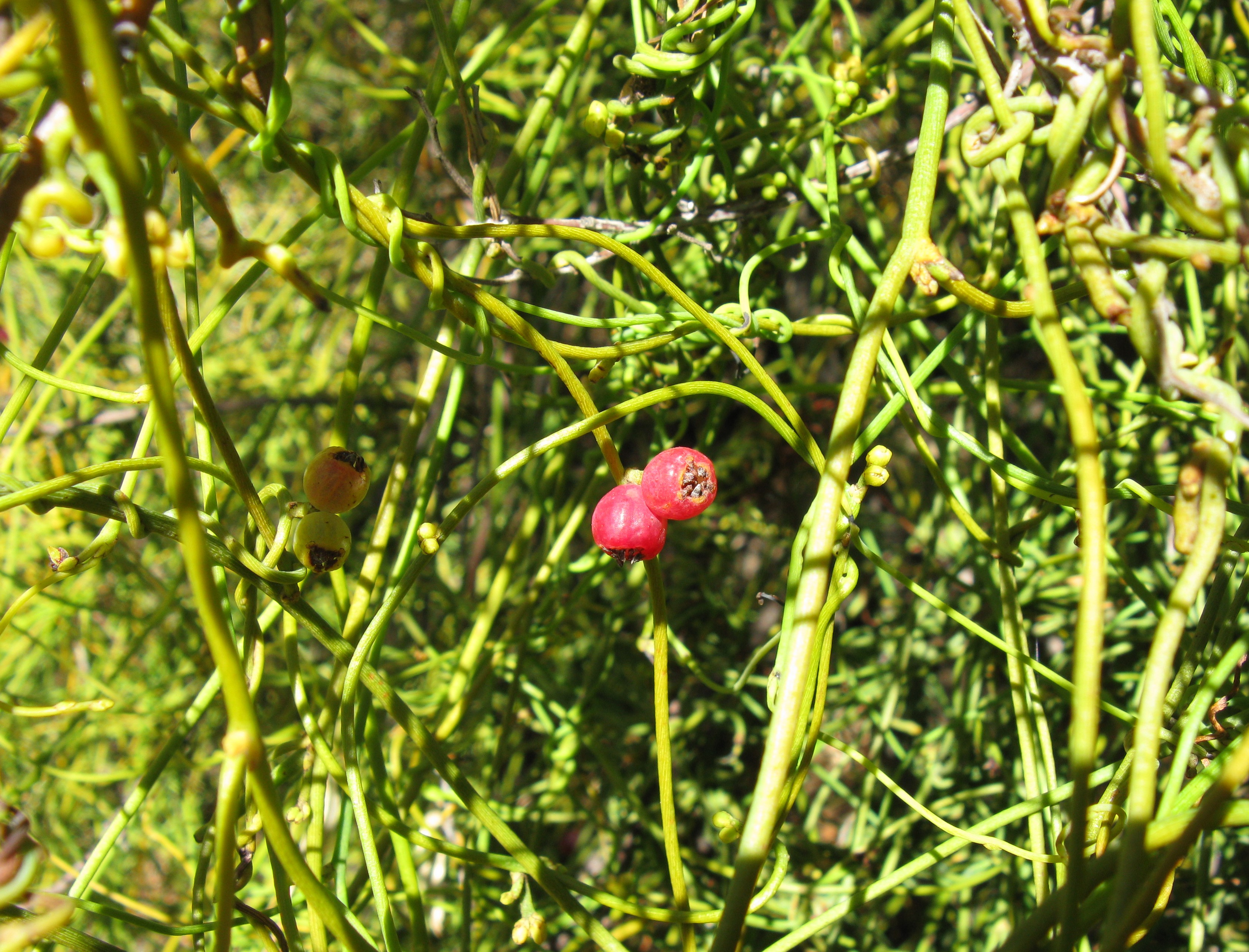
Cassytha ciliolata, showing flower buds, flowers, fruit, and haustoria both on its own stems and host bark

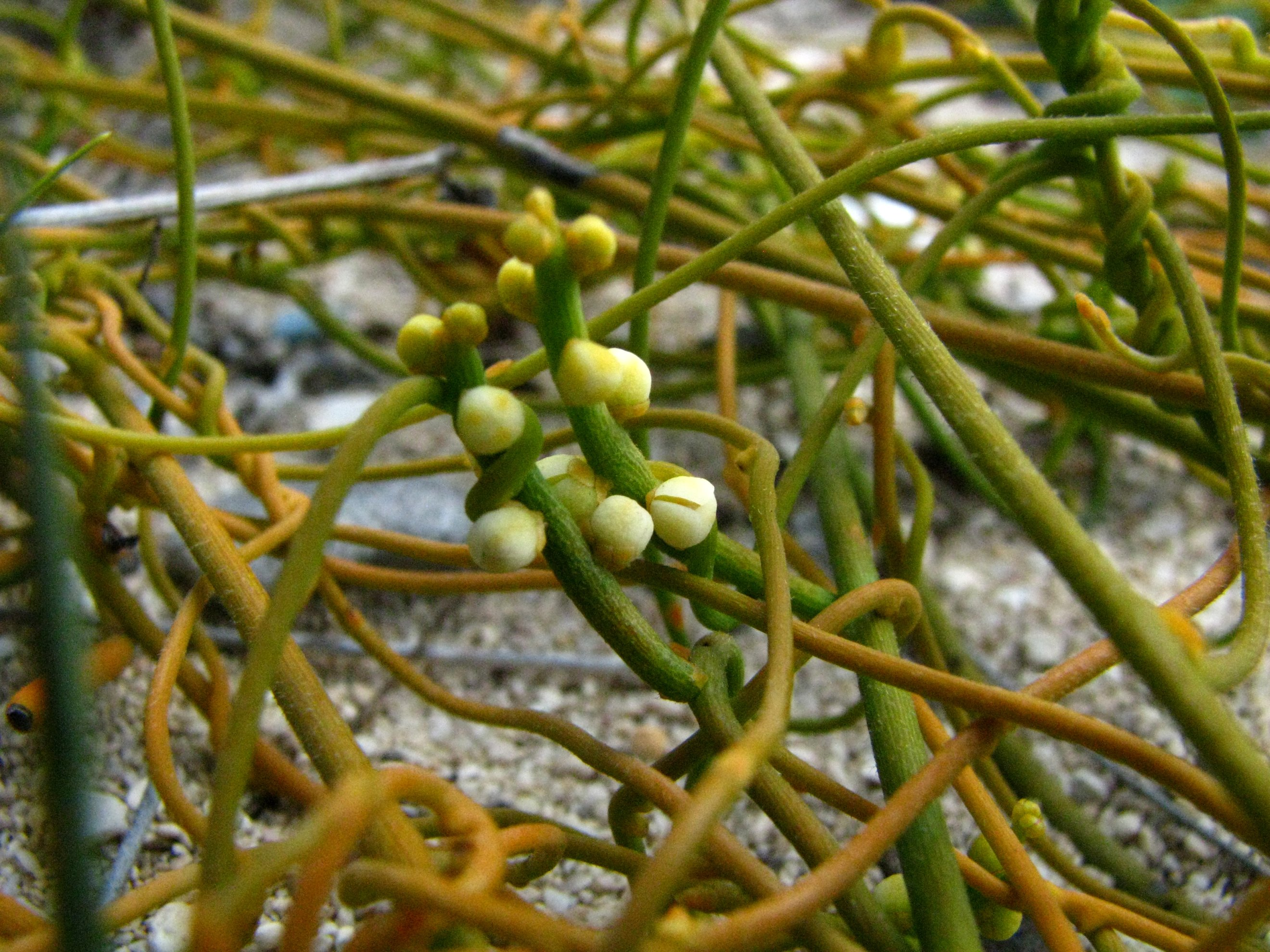
Cassytha filiformis buds and opening flower

Cassytha is a genus of some two dozen species of obligately parasitic vines in the family Lauraceae. Superficially, and in some aspects of their ecology, they closely resemble plants in the unrelated genus Cuscuta, the dodders. When fruit and flowers are absent in the field, the physical resemblance is so close that few people without technical training can discern the difference. In this respect and in their ecology the two genera present a spectacular example of convergent evolution. Nonetheless, Nickrent comments that "Cassytha is uneqivocally assigned to Lauraceae based on (both) morphological and molecular data." In its divergence from habits typical of the Lauraceae, Cassytha also presents examples of mosaic evolution

Several species of Cassytha are regarded as pests in various regions, though as a rule they are not as serious a problem as the true dodders. Some even yield a welcome harvest of fruit, or are valued for their perceived medicinal or aphrodisiac properties, partly because, like many members of the Lauraceae, some are fragrant when bruised. Their stems make useful strings for construction of thatched roofs and certain styles of lei and the like.

== Description ==
Cassytha are obligately parasitic, scandent, herbaceous plants with thread-like or wiry stems, which twine around the hostplant clockwise as seen from the source of growth. The vines generally turn yellowish once they have established themselves on a productive host because they then reduce or stop their production of chlorophyll. Cassytha species are stem parasites, adhering to their hosts by uniseriate haustoria that generally are small and oblong. Their leaves are without stipules, alternate, simple, and easily overlooked, being minute and scale-like.

Various species of Cassytha bear flowers in racemes, spikes, or heads. Depending on the species, the flowers are sessile or pedicellate. The individual flowers are hermaphroditic and bracteolate, each being attended by a bract and two smaller bracteoles. In general, the flowers are small, so much so that in many species they are inconspicuous.

The perianth has six tepals, the three outer tepals smaller than the inner. The 12 stamens are in four whorls. The receptacle of the fertilised fruit gradually envelops the ovary, becoming the fleshy part of the ripe fruit, which often retains the dried remnants of the perianth at its tip. In effect, the resulting fruit structure is a tiny drupe. The endocarp is bony and plays an important part in the reproductive process, both in protecting the seed while the fruit is eaten and in inhibiting germination until the endocarp decays, thereby permitting long-lived soil seed banks to accumulate.

== Taxonomy ==
The genus was described by Carl Linnaeus in 1753 in his monumental work, Species Plantarum with Cassytha filiformis L. as the type species. The taxon authorship is sometimes also given to Pehr Osbeck, but Linnaeus supplied the description, and not Osbeck, so the authorship should be given to Linnaeus.

Due to its herbaceous and parasitic habit, distinguishing the genus from all other Lauraceae, Cassytha has historically presented a problem for classification. Most early systems of classification based on morphological characters divided the Lauraceae into two subfamilies: Cassythoideae and Lauroideae; however, more recent molecular data disputes this division.

Based on the trnK intron, a common phylogenetic marker for classifying angiosperms, Rohwer and Rudolph (2005) created a phylogeny of the Lauraceae. They nested Cassytha within the family, more closely related to Caryodaphnopsis, and placed both as sister to the tribe Cryptocaryeae, one of the three tribes of the Lauroideae. More recently, embryological evidence, specifically the development of the anther tapetum, substantiated the close relationship of the two genera, but nested them within the tribe Cryptocareae. Ultimately, the exact phylogeny of Cassytha is still in dispute; however, its non-basal placement within the Lauraceae is undoubtedly accurate.

=== Etymology ===
The genus name Cassytha is derived from the Greek name for the genus Cuscuta, which it closely resembles.

=== Species ===
As of September 2026, Plants of the World Online accepts the following 23 species:

- Cassytha aurea J.Z.Weber – southwest Australia
- Cassytha candida (J.Z.Weber) J.Z.Weber – northern Australia
- Cassytha capillaris Meisn. – Assam, Sri Lanka, Vietnam, Borneo, Lesser Sunda Islands, Maluku Islands, New Guinea, northern Australia
- Cassytha ciliolata Nees – South Africa
- Cassytha filiformis L. – The Americas, Australasia, Indomalaya, tropical Africa and Polynesia
- Cassytha flava Nees – southwest Australia
- Cassytha flindersii (J.Z.Weber) J.Z.Weber – South Australia
- Cassytha glabella (Nees) J.Z.Weber – Australia
- Cassytha larsenii Kosterm. – Thailand
- Cassytha melantha R.Br. – western and southern Australia
- Cassytha micrantha Meisn. – southwest Australia
- Cassytha nodiflora Meisn. – southwest Australia
- Cassytha paniculata R.Br. – eastern Australia
- Cassytha pedicellosa J.Z.Weber – Tasmania
- Cassytha peninsularis J.Z.Weber – South Australia
- Cassytha pergracilis (Hatus.) Hatus. – Ryukyu Islands
- Cassytha phaeolasia (F.Muell.) Benth. – southeastern Australia
- Cassytha pomiformis Nees – Western Australia
- Cassytha pondoensis Engl. – southern tropical Africa and South Africa
- Cassytha pubescens R.Br. – Australia, New Zealand, Okinawa
- Cassytha racemosa Nees – southwest Australia
- Cassytha rufa J.Z.Weber – Queensland

Some species of the cactus genus Rhipsalis once were assigned to Cassytha in an error arising from the resemblance in habitus. An unfortunate consequence has been that the homonym Cassytha Mill. (1768) is often mentioned as a synonym of the genus Rhipsalis, although this perception is incorrect, since the generic name Cassytha had already been applied to a completely different genus in a different plant family.

The morphology and ecology of Cassytha are so atypical of the family Lauraceae, they have been the subject of molecular genetic research to confirm their taxonomic relationships. Though special aspects to their phylogeny certainly are under debate, their assignment to the Lauraceae generally is regarded as undoubtedly correct.

== Common names and confusion ==
Probably the most useful common names for Cassytha species are laurel dodder or dodder laurel, because they look like dodder and are fragrant members of the laurel family, Lauraceae. The name love vine has merit because some species, in particular C. filiformis, are regarded as aphrodisiacs in the Caribbean region. In practice, the confusion between the various species of Cassytha and Cuscuta is so unavoidable that their common names are more or less interchangeable. Practically all the common names for dodder accordingly are widely applied in error to Cassytha as well, but as a matter of convenience in Florida at least, where members of both groups of plants are present as agricultural pests, a publication of the Department of Agriculture adopts the names woe vine for Cassytha and dodder for Cuscuta.

== Context and distribution ==
Though the Lauraceae constitute a large family, with thousands of species in tens of genera, Cassytha is its only known parasitic genus, and its climbing habit also is atypical of the family; most Lauraceae are woody shrubs or trees. The genus at one time was assigned its own family, Cassythaceae, but currently agreement on its inclusion into the Lauraceae is general.

As currently defined, Cassytha has a wide distribution for a genus of so few species. Most are native to Australia (including temperate regions, where they are the only native members of the family), but a few are indigenous to Africa, southern Asia, various islands, and regions in the Americas. Some species seem to have been spread inadvertently by humans and probably by birds as well, and now occur on several continents. C. filiformis, for example, grows in Hawaii (where it is said to be indigenous), the Australasian realm, northern South America, Central America, southern Florida, Japan, and South Africa. It also appears to have been transported to many major islands, and now is effectively pantropical.

== Reproduction and ecology ==
Cassytha fruits are ecologically valuable to some fruit-eating birds. The birds either regurgitate the seeds or pass them through their gut. Mammals, for example Australian macropods, also transport the seeds in their gut. The bony endocarp that protects the seed in its passage through animal gut also prevents the seed from immediate germination even if conditions are favourable. Instead, the seeds survive on or in the ground till decay weakens the endocarp sufficiently to permit moisture to enter and germination to begin. This process is not deterministic, so some of the seeds might remain inactive in the soil seed bank for many years before they germinate at unpredictable intervals. Accordingly, once soil is infested with large numbers of seeds, eradication of the population generally requires considerable time. On germination, the seedlings behave as aggressive parasites; they twist about till they find a host, and those that fail to locate hosts soon die, typically in months.

Seedlings and actively growing shoots are green at first. Once their haustoria are fully established on a suitable host, the plants lose most of their chlorophyll and generally become yellowish or orange, and the Cassytha plant abandons its connections with its root, which soon dies.

Cassytha species are perennials; although they attack practically whatever host plants they encounter, including suitable annuals. They seem to show some preference for woody perennial hosts. Consequently, they often find themselves on seasonally dormant host species. When that happens and the supplies from the host largely dry up, the stems of most species of Cassytha turn green until the host once again becomes productive. This suggests that such species are at least marginally photosynthetic, but do not invest resources unnecessarily when photosynthesis is not required. Cassytha species do produce some of their own nutrients while green, so their chlorophyll production is both actual and functional.

Technically, Cassytha could be regarded as hemiparasitic rather than holoparasitic, but their own autotrophic contributions are plainly limited to what it takes to tide over temporary shortages. When all the hosts of a plant die, so does the parasite, so whatever the details of their biology, Cassytha species certainly are unconditionally obligately parasitic. No doubt their lack of a persistent root system dooms any Cassytha plants whose hosts supply insufficient water and mineral nutrients.

The effects of Cassytha on host plants varies. They are not very selective and they parasitise hosts from many plant families, often overwhelming a host so drastically as to kill it. Even when host plants survive, a heavy infestation commonly causes drastic reduction in vigour and reproductive capacity. Accordingly, some species of Cassytha have been examined as potential weed control agents, and others are regarded as agricultural pests in their own right.

Although Cassytha species are vigorous parasites, they are less aggressive, and correspondingly less serious agricultural pests, than Cuscuta species; Cuscuta species generally grow several times faster, produce more seed, and germinate more rapidly, though their seeds are less persistent in the soil.

Among their various ecological effects, Cassytha species act as vectors, though not exclusive vectors, for various plant diseases. They may pass various fungi, Agrobacterium species, viruses, and other pathogens to host plants, or from one host plant to another.

== Uses ==
Cassytha is best known for its parasitic habit, and the various species are neither prominent as crop plants, nor as beneficial plants. Species within the genus do have minor uses in rural communities globally. For example, the fruit of various species are eaten, both by birds and by humans, and C. melantha in particular has been documented as a wild-harvested Australian indigenous food. The flesh of fruit is very sticky and chewy, and has a taste reminiscent of feijoa. In the Caribbean region, C. filiformis is one of the plant species known as love vine, because it has a reputation as an aphrodisiac.

Plants in the genus contain low concentrations of several alkaloids that have not yet been shown to be of great value, but do have biochemical properties worthy of investigation. Together with the fragrant essential oils in some species, the alkaloids might be relevant to the wide application of Cassytha species in folk medicine and in traditional teas.

Though they are not of commercial interest as fibre crops, suitably prepared vines from some Cassytha species are of value in rural communities as a source of cord. They may be used for binding bundles of materials such as thatch, or for stringing decorative festoons.
