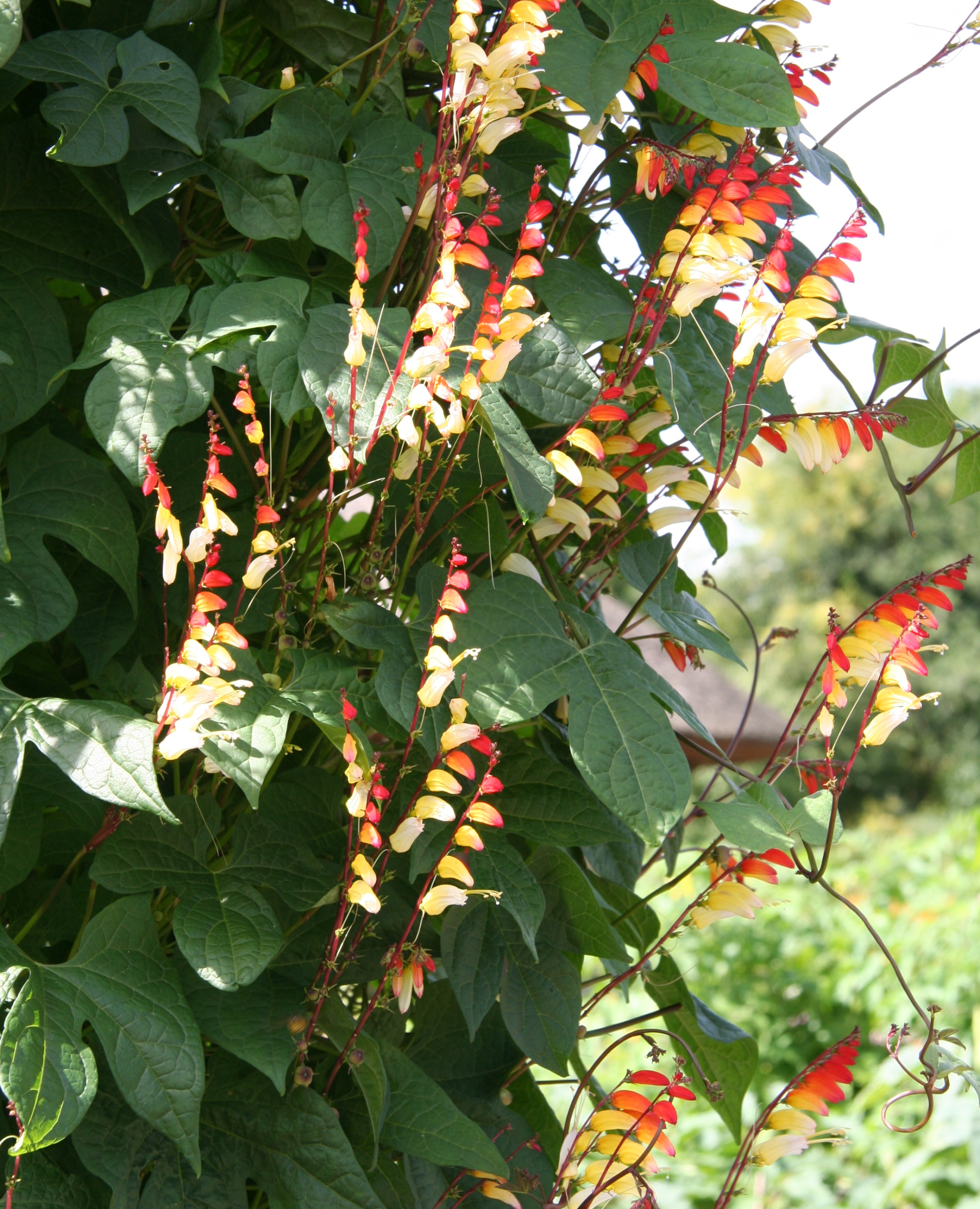
- I. lobata, Dresden Botanical Garden

Scientific classification
- Kingdom: Plantae
- Clade: Tracheophytes
- Clade: Angiosperms
- Clade: Eudicots
- Clade: Asterids
- Order: Solanales
- Family: Convolvulaceae
- Genus: Ipomoea
- Species: I. lobata

Binomial name
- Ipomoea lobata (Cerv.) Thell.

Synonyms
- Ipomoea versicolor Meisn.; Mina lobata Cerv.; Quamoclit lobata

= Ipomoea lobata =

Species of flowering plant

Ipomoea lobata, the fire vine, firecracker vine or Spanish flag (formerly Mina lobata), is a species of flowering plant in the family Convolvulaceae, native to Mexico and Brazil.

Growing to 5 m (16 ft) tall, Ipomoea lobata is a perennial climber often cultivated in temperate regions as an annual. It has toothed and lobed leaves (hence lobata) and one-sided racemes of flowers, opening red and fading to yellow, cream and white. These colours are graded down the length of the flower spike. The effect is like a firework, hence one of its popular names "firecracker vine". The colours vaguely resemble the red and gold of Spain's national flag, hence its other common name "Spanish flag".

Ipomoea lobata requires a minimum temperature of 5 °C (41 °F), and a warm, sheltered spot in full sun (either equatorial-facing or west-facing). It has gained the Royal Horticultural Society's Award of Garden Merit.

It is closely related to two other popular, award-winning climbing plants, Ipomoea indica (blue dawn flower) and Ipomoea tricolor (morning glory).

The name "Spanish flag" is also used for Lantana camara, an ornamental shrub.
