= List of Bohol flora and fauna =

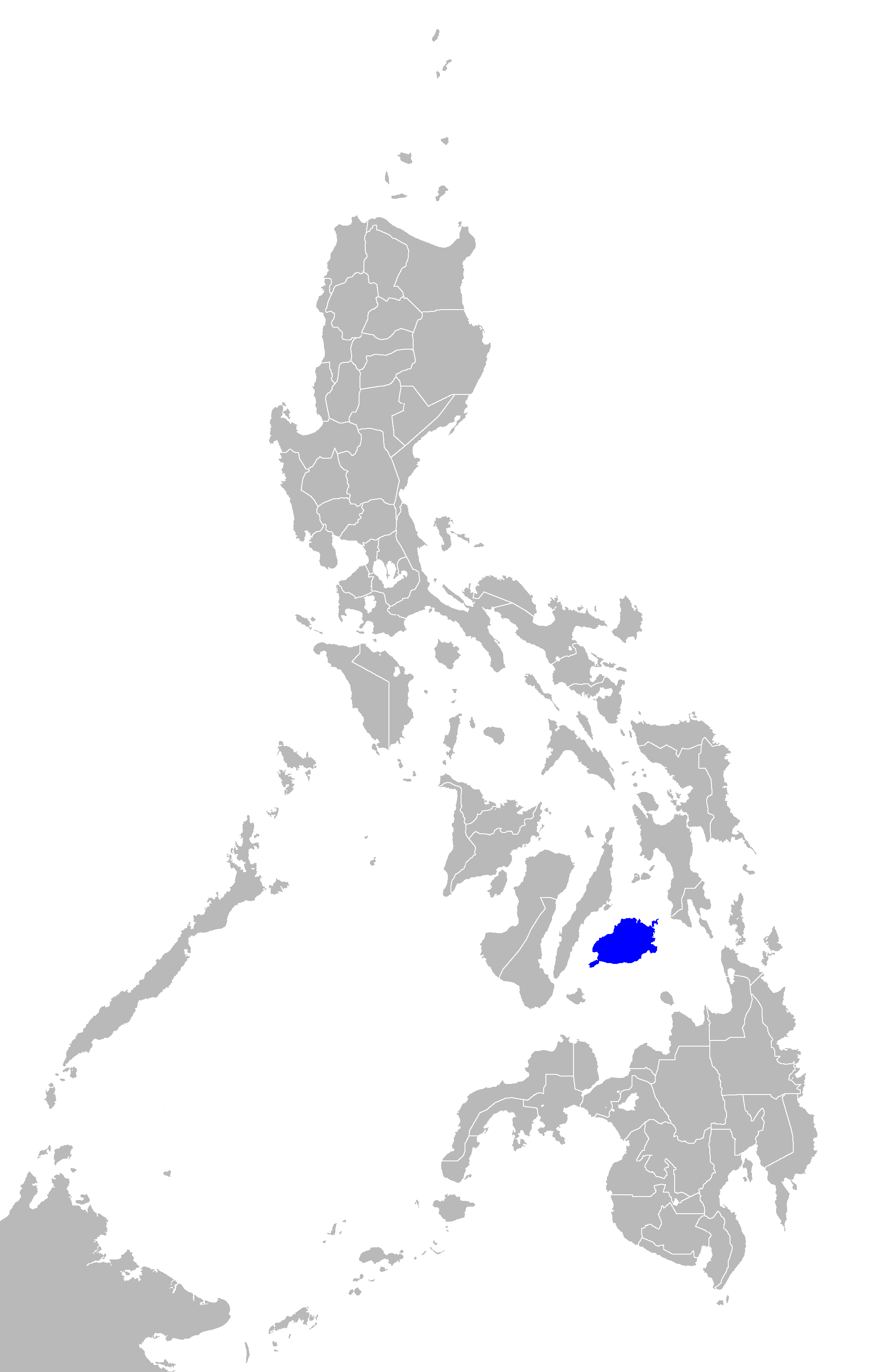
locator map of Bohol

The Philippines supports a rich and varied flora with close botanical connections to Indonesia and mainland Southeast Asia. Forests cover almost one-half of the land area and are typically tropical, with the dominant family, Dipterocarpaceae, representing 75% of the stands. The forest also has vines, epiphytes, and climbers. Open grasslands, ranging up to 2.4 m (8 ft) in height, occupy one-fourth of the land area; they are man- made, the aftermath of the slash-and-burn agricultural system, and most contain tropical savanna grasses that are nonnutritious and difficult to eradicate. The diverse flora includes 8,000 species of flowering plants, 1,000 kinds of ferns, and 800 species of orchids.

Seventy to eighty percent of non-flying mammals in the Philippines are found nowhere else in the world. Common mammals include the wild hog, deer, wild carabao, monkey, civet cat, and various rodents. There are about 196 breeding species of birds, among the more numerous being the megapodes (turkey-like wildfowl), button quail, jungle fowl, peacock pheasant, dove, pigeon, parrot, and hornbill. Reptilian life is represented by 190 species; there are crocodiles and the larger snakes include the python and several varieties of cobra.

The fauna on Bohol is almost identical to that on Mindanao, Samar, and Leyte, but not that on nearby Negros. Scientists believe that the floral and faunal biodiversity unique to the Philippines is caused by the Ice Age. They also believe that the country has the most severely endangered plant and animal communities on earth.

Bohol is an island province in the Philippines and its 10th largest island. It is located in the Central Visayas region and has a population of 1,137,000 (2000 census) with an area of 4,117.3 km. This is a list of the most common species and varieties of flora and fauna specific to the province of Bohol in the Philippines, endemic or otherwise

== List of Bohol Flora ==
=== Hardwood and other tree species ===
1. abihíd-Spondias pinnata
2. Acacia – Rain tree; Samanea saman Merr.; Other scientific names: Mimosa saman Jacq.; Inga saman Willd.; Pithecolobium saman Benth.; Enterolobium saman Prain
3. almáciga – Agathis philippinensis
4. bagakay
5. Bagalñga (C. Bis.) – Lygodium japonicum; Paraiso Bagalunga – Melia dubia
6. bago-Gnetum gnemon
7. balete – India rubber tree; Ficus elastica
8. bánaba – Lagerstroemia speciosa; queen's flower or crepe myrtle and the pride of India;
9. bangkal – Nauclea orientalis; Leichhardt tree, yellow cheesewood
10. bangkaw – Nauclea subdita; bulobangkal, bongkol
11. Batinô – Alstonia macrophylla
12. bitaóg – Calophyllkum blancoi; Calophyllum wallichianum Vidal
13. bujangjang – Prayer beads; Arbus precatorius Linn.; saga
14. bulí – Corypha elata Roxb.; buri
15. kawayan – Bambusa spinosa; Bambusa vulgaris
16. dapdap – Erythrina variegata Linn. var. orientalis (Linn.); Indian coal tree
17. Date palm – Palmae (INTRODUCED)
18. dorol – also called doldol; kapok (Tag.); Ceiba pentandra
19. Eucalyptus – Eucalyptus globulus (INTRODUCED)
20. Gemilina – Gmelina arborea (INTRODUCED)
21. Ipil-ipil – Leucaena leucocephala Linn. (INTRODUCED)
22. lauaan – Diptecarpus thurifer white lauan – Shorea contorta
23. lubí – niyóg – Coconut – Cocos nucifera
24. madre de cacao – kakawate; Gliricidia sepium (INTRODUCED)
25. mahogany – Philippine Mahogany; Swietenia mahagoni (Meliaceae) (INTRODUCED)
26. mangga – Mango; Mangifera indica (Anacardiaceae); Bohol mangga
27. mangrove – Rhizophora mangle; red mangrove; pagatpat; manggal
28. mangrove – Avicennia nitida; black mangrove
29. mangrove – Sonneratia
30. mangrove – Brugiera; red mangrove
31. mangrove – bakhawan babae-Rhizophora mucronata; bakhawan lalake-Rhizophora apiculata
32. mangrove – piyapî
33. mangrove – piyag-aw; bigî or tabigi; Xylocarpus moluccensis
34. mangrove – Bigî (Tagb.); Tabigi-Xylocarpus granatum
35. maribojoc – agoho; Casuarina equisitofolia
36. molave – Vitex parviflora; tugás
37. narra – Philippine cedar; Pterocarpus indicus; Pterocarpus santalinus
38. Neem tree – Azadirachta indica (INTRODUCED)
39. ninô or linô – Indian mulberry; Morinda citrifolia; apatot (noni juice)
40. nipâ – Nypa fruticans; nipâ palm
41. nitô – Lygodium japonicum
42. oliva – olive; Cycas revoluta
43. pitogo – Cycas
44. papuwá – annatto; Bixa orellana Linn.; suetes; atsuete (INTRODUCED)
45. rattan – Calamus
46. Rubber tree – Hevea brasiliensis (Euphorbiaceae) (INTRODUCED)
47. teak – Philippine teak; Tectona philippinensis
48. tipó – Antipolo; Artocarpus blancoi Merr.
49. talisay – Terminalia catappa; almond
50. yakál – Dipterocarpus plagutus-Shorea astylosa

Note: very highly regulated species in the Philippines: lauaan, narra, Philippine mahogany

=== Fruit trees/plants ===
1. alibangbang – Bauhinia malabarica; butterfly-shaped leaves from a tree used for souring
2. atis – sugar apple; Annona squamosa Linn.; anonas (INTRODUCED)
3. Avocado – Persea americana; avocado (INTRODUCED)
4. balingbing – star fruit; Averrhoa carambola Linn.; also Averrhoa pentandra Blanco (INTRODUCED)
5. batuan – Garcinia morella, a small sour green fruit with a large seed
6. bayabas – Guava; Psidium guajava (INTRODUCED)
7. boongon – pomelo; Citrus maxima
8. bugnay – Antidesma bunius Linn.; bignay
9. cacao – Theobroma cacao (INTRODUCED)
10. kapeng barako – Philippine coffee; Coffea arabica; Coffea canephora or C. robusta (INTRODUCED)
11. kaimito – caimito; Chrysophyllum caninito Linn.; star apple (INTRODUCED)
12. chico – Achras sapota Linn.; Sapota achras Mill.; Sapota zapotilla Coville (INTRODUCED)
13. chico- Manilkara zapote, a brown sweet fruit with black seeds (INTRODUCED)
14. Chinese holly – Ilex cornuta (INTRODUCED)
15. Curcuma domestica, turmeric (INTRODUCED)
16. dayáp – Citrus aurantifolia, lime (INTRODUCED)
17. duhat – Syzygium cumini, Java plum
18. durian – Durio zibethinus
19. granada – Punica granatum; Pomegranate (INTRODUCED)
20. guyabano – Soursop; Annona muricata Linnaeus or A. muricata L. (Annonaceae); guyabano
21. ibâ – Averrhoa bilimbi; kamias
22. joló; koló – bread fruit; Artocarpus altilis
23. kamátsile – Pithecellobium dulce, kamachille, Madras thorn fruit
24. kapayas or kapajas – Papaya; Carica papaya L. (Caricaceae) (INTRODUCED)
25. kasúy – Anacardium occidentale, cashew (INTRODUCED)
26. lanzones – Lansium parasiticum
27. lemoncito – × Citrofortunella microcarpa, kalamansi a small lime indigenous to the Philippines; also called Calamondin, Chinese orange, Panama orange
28. linga – Sesamum indicum
29. lomboy – black plum; Syzygium cumini; duhat in Tagalog
30. macopa – Syzygium samarangense
31. mangga – mango; Mangifera indica (carabao, pajo)
32. manzanitas – datiles; ratiles; Muntingia calabura; a little cherry-like wild fruit (INTRODUCED)
33. marang – Artocarpus odoratissima
34. nangkâ – Jackfruit; Artocarpus heterophyllus Lam.; langkâ (INTRODUCED)
35. orange – Citrus aurantium; local orange; dalandan in Tagalog (INTRODUCED)
36. orange – Mandarin orange; Citrus reticulata (INTRODUCED)
37. orange – tangerine orange; Citrus nobilis;dalandan (INTRODUCED)
38. orange – local lemon or lime – Citrus; dayap in Tagalog (INTRODUCED)
39. orange – Citrus medica (INTRODUCED)
40. passion fruit – Passiflora incarnata (INTRODUCED)
41. pili nut – Canarium ovatum
42. pinya or pinja – Pineapple; Ananas comosus
43. saging tundan – Banana; Musa; (Musaceae)
44. Saging sab-a – Banana variety; Musa (Musaceae)
45. Saging cavendish; Banana variety; Musa (Musaceae)
46. Saging senyorita; Banana variety; Musa (Musaceae)
47. Saging morado
48. sambag – Tamarindus indica; tamarind; sampalok (INTRODUCED)
49. Santol – Sandoricum koetjape Merr. (INTRODUCED)
50. siriguelas; sineguelas in Visayan or sigarilyas in Tagalog Spondias sp
51. suwâ-suwâ – Triphasia trifolia P. Wils.
52. tambis – Syzygium malaccense; Malay apple; Tersana rose apple
53. tisâ
54. Tree fern – Cyathea spp. spp.
55. watermelon – Curcubita citrullus Linn.; also Citrullus vulgaris Schrad.; pakwan (INTRODUCED)

=== Vegetables ===
1. ahos – Garlic; Allium sativum; bawang
2. Alugbati – Malabar nightshade; Basella rubra Linn.
3. batong – string beans; Bataw; Dolichos labiab Linn.
4. carrot – karot; Daucus carota L.
5. kabasâ – kalabasâ; squash; Cucurbita maxima Duchesne; Curcubita sulcata Blanco
6. kamatis – Tomato; Solanum lycopersicum or Lycopersicum esculentum
7. kamunggay – malunggay; Moringa oleifera
8. katuray – Sesbania grandiflora, a white flower used in salads
9. kinstsay – Apium graveolens, Chinese celery
10. kolis – Pisonia alba, lettuce tree, also called maluko in Tagalog
11. kulitis – Amaranthus viridis, slender amaranth
12. kundol – Benicasa hispida; wax gourd
13. kutsay – Allium odorum; Chinese chives
14. Lagundî; Vitex negundo
15. laurel – Antidesma bunius; Chinese laurel
16. luy-a – ginger; Zingiber officinale; luya
17. munggos – munggo; Phaseolus aureus; green mung bean
18. mustasa – Brassica juncea v. integrifola; mustard greens
19. okra – Abelmoschus escuclentus Linn.; also Hibiscus esculentis Linn.
20. pandan -Pandanus odoratissimus; screw pine
21. paliyá or palijá – Bitter melon; Momordica charantia; Ampalaya
22. patola – Luffa cylindrica; sponge gourd
23. patola – Luffa acutangula; Loofah
24. pechay – Brassica chinensis; pakchoy; bokchoy
25. pipino – cucumber; Cucumis sativus
26. pipino – Cucumber; zucchini; Cucurbita pepo
27. radish; Raphanus
28. repolyo – cabbage; Brassica oleracea
29. saluyot – Corchorus olitorius; Jew's mallow
30. sayote – Sechium edule; chayote; mirliton pear
31. sibuyas bombay – Onion; Allium cepa
32. sibuyas dahon – Allium sativum
33. sili – Capsicum annuum; chili
34. sili'ng kulikot – Capsicum frutescens; siling labuyo; Cayenne
35. sili- pepper; Solanum capsicum (Solanaceae)
36. singkamas – Pachyrhizus erosus; yambean
37. tangkong or kangkong; Ipomoea aquatica; swamp cabbage, potato vine
38. tawong or talong; eggplant – Solanum melongena
39. Ocimum sanctum – holy basil
40. upo – Lagenaria leucantha; bottle gourd
41. Corindrium sativum – coriander leaf

=== Flowering plants ===
1. adelfa – Oleander; South sea rose; Nerium indicum Mill.; Neroum oleander Blanco; Nerium odorum Soland.
2. alas kuwatro
3. antuwanga – gumamela; hibiscus; China rose; shoeflower; Hibiscus × rosa-sinensis
4. Asparagus (genus) – green fern, for bouquets; Asparagus plumosus
5. Aster
6. bahug-bahug – Vernonia cinerea; bulak-manok; billy goat weed
7. banaba – Lagerstroemia speciosa
8. bangka-bangkaan – Rhoeo discolor
9. bird of paradise (plant) – Strelitzia reginae
10. bombil – bougainvillea; Bougainvillea
11. Bromeliad
12. bunga – Areca nut; Areca catechu; Areca alba (lubi lubi)
13. caballero – peacock flower; Caesalpinia pulcherrima Linn.; bulaklak ng paraiso
14. Comfrey – Symphytum officinale L (tambal sa nuka)
15. cosmos – Cosmos (genus)
16. cosmos (bahô) – Tagetes erecta
17. Chrysanthemum – Chrysanthemum sinense; manzanilla
18. daisy
19. dancing lady
20. dandelion- Taraxacum officinale Weber; Leontodon taraxacum Linn.; Taraxacum dens-leonis Desf.
21. Dendrobium
22. duranta – "Duranta repens Linn."; golden duranta
23. Ginseng
24. ground orchids
25. ilang ilang – also known as Ylang-ylang; Cananga odorata
26. Japanese rose – Rosa rugosa
27. kalachuchi – frangipani; Plumeria; Plumeria rubra
28. kataká-taká – Kalanchoe pinnata (synonym: Bryophyllum pinnatum)
29. kalanchoe – Kalanchoe sp.
30. kamantigi – mantigi; Touch me not; Impatiens balsamina
31. kutsaritas – Althernanthera sp.; (Amaranthaceae)
32. kulitis – Amaranthus spinosus; uray
33. kumintang – also tsitsirika; rosy periwinkle; Catharanthus roseus
34. lirio – Crinum latifolim Linn.
35. Maiden's hair plant – Chlorodesmis sp.
36. Marigold – Calendula
37. mayana or majana – Coleus sp.; Coleus blumei
38. Million flower
39. pamintâ – Piper nigrum; black pepper
40. pandong pandong – Celosia cristata Linn.; cock's comb
41. Paragayo – san francisco
42. Poinsettia – Euphorbia pulcherrima
43. quiapo – kiapo; water cabbage; Pistia stratiotes
44. rosál – Gardenia jasminioides; gardenia
45. rose – rose; Genus: Rosa
46. sabila – Aloe vera
47. sagisi – Anahaw
48. sagusahis – used as sandpaper for desks
49. sampaguita – Jasmine; Jasminum sambac Linn.
50. santal ?
51. santan – Ixora sp.
52. sunflower – Helianthus annuus
53. tsampaka – Michelia champaca
54. Verbena – Verbena officinalis
55. violeta – bayolota; violets; Viola odorata L.
56. waling-waling- Vanda
57. yellow bell – kampanilya; Allamanda cathartica

=== Bohol endemic species ===
1. Arygyreia boholensis (Convolvulaceae)
2. Blumea stenophylla (Labiatae)
3. Dendrocalamus sp.- large bamboos; kawayan
4. Dischidias (Asclepiadaceae)
5. Hoyas
6. Imperata cylindrica
7. Ixora littoralis (Rubiaceae)
8. Macrosolena mcgregorii (Loranthaceae)
9. Saccharum spontaneum
10. Several Compositae
11. lukdo – ferns

=== Grasses/Herbs/Weeds ===
1. abacá – Musa textilis; Manila Hemp
2. acapulco – Cassia alata
3. amor seco – Andropogon aciculatus
4. bahô-bahô- Utot-utot; koronitas; kantutay; Lantana camara
5. bilâ bilâ – Eleusine indica
6. bugáng – talahib; Saccharum spontaneum
7. butones butones – Cyperus rotundus
8. cogon – kogon; Imperata cylindrica
9. Euphorbia hirta
10. fern 1 – Athyrium esculentum; pako
11. fern 2 – bird's nest fern; Asplenium nidus
12. fern 3 – Drynaria quercifolia
13. gulasiman – Portulaca oleracea
14. hibî-hibî – makahiya; Mimosa pudica
15. humay – rice; Oryza sativa; palay
16. kana (Bis.) – Cardiospermum halicacabum; Heart Pea; Balloon Vine
17. kanding-kanding – Stachytarpheta jamaicensis
18. maís – corn
19. Oregano – Origanum vulgare; wild marjoram, mountain mint, origanum, wintersweet and winter marjoram
20. oregano – Coleus aromaticus Benth.
21. peppermint – Mentha piperita
22. Quisqualis indica – Chinese honeysuckle; "niyog-niyogan"
23. sábila – Aloe vera;
24. Sambong- Blumea camphora; Blumea balsamifera
25. sinaw sinaw or sida sida – ulasimang Bato; Peperomia pellucida; pansit-pansitan
26. tangad or tanglad – lemon grass; Cymbopogon citratus; Cymbopogon spp.
27. tawá tawá – Euphorbia hirta; boto-botonis; gatas-gatas
28. tubó – sugar cane; Saccharum officinarum
29. tubá-tubá – Jatropha curcas; also known as tubang bakod in Tagalog; Physic Nut in English or interchangeably tubá-tubá or Jatropha (Tuba-Tuba Plant Seeds (Jatropha) to Bio-diesel Fuel)
30. tsaang gubat – Ehretia microphylla;
31. yerba buena – Mentha spicata

=== Root crops ===
1. apale
2. balanghoy – Cassava; Manihot esculenta Crantz; kamoteng kahoy
3. camote – Sweet potatoes; Ipomoea batatas
4. gabi – taro; Colocasia esculenta Linn.
5. patatas – potatoes; Solanum tuberosum
6. singkamas – Pachyrrhizus erosus Linn.
7. Ube kinampay – purple yam; Dioscorea alata
8. Ube- yam; Dioscorea alata
9. other cash crops

=== Seaweeds ===
1. Acetabularia
2. ambáng
3. Chlorella
4. Codium fragile
5. eelgrasses – seagrasses; thalasia
6. guaman – Gracilaria compressa
7. gusô – Eucheuma spinosum
8. kelp – Macrocystis
9. Laminaria
10. latô – Caulerpa racemosa
11. Laurencia
12. lukót
13. Porphyra
14. Samô – Sargassum
15. Ulothrix
16. Ulva – sea lettuce

== Gallery of some Bohol Flora ==
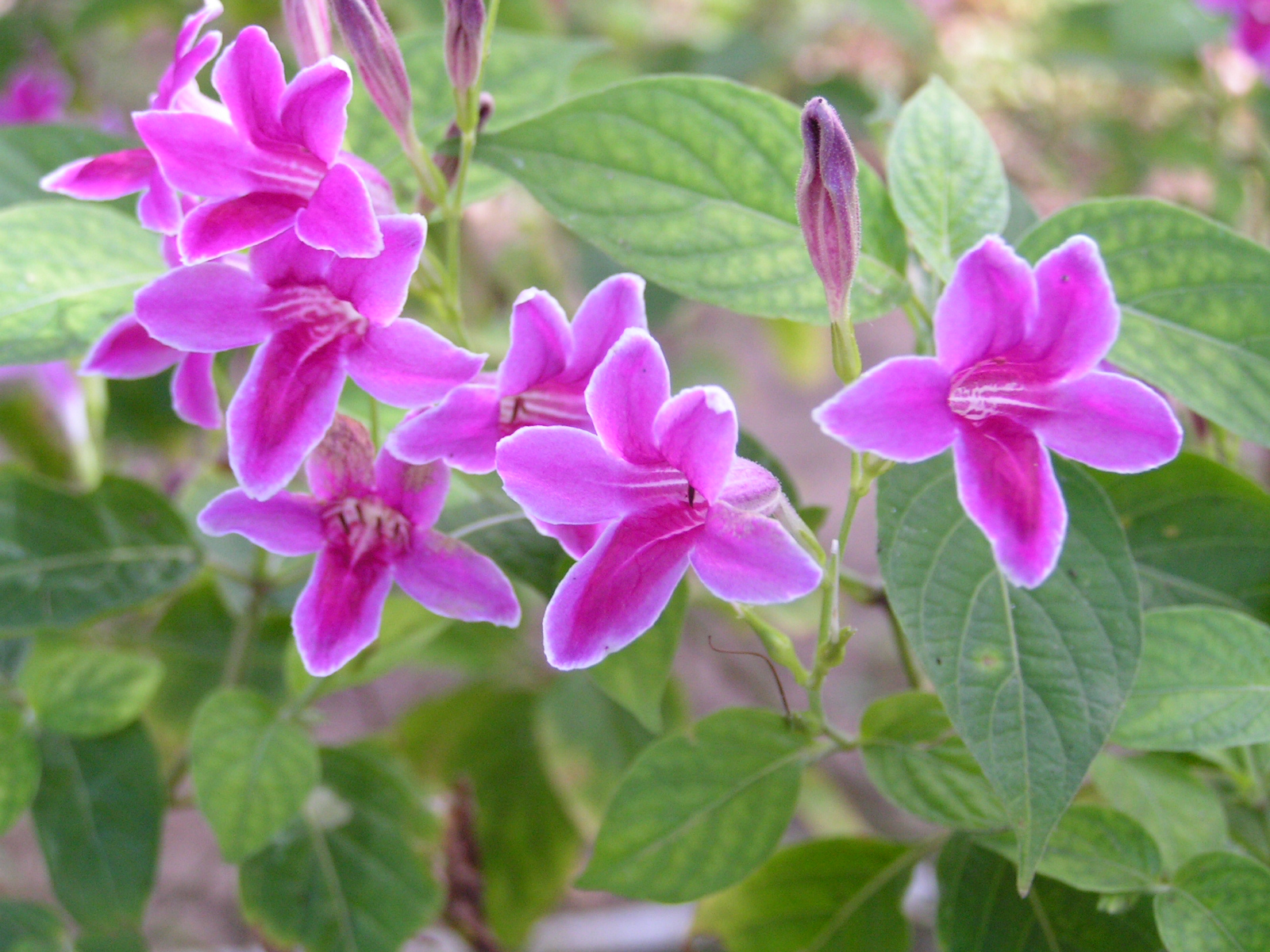
Bohol Flora 1

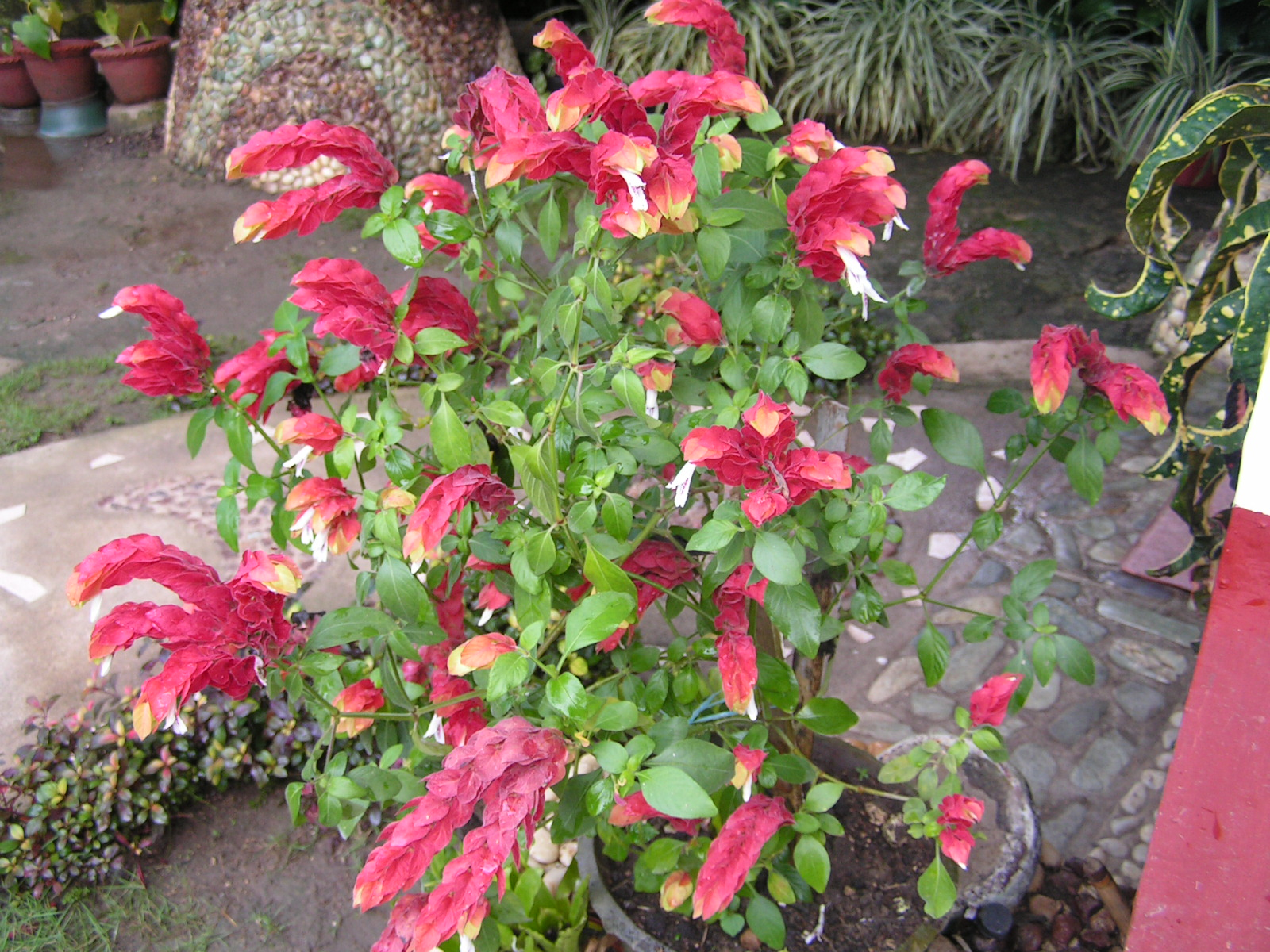
Bohol Flora 2

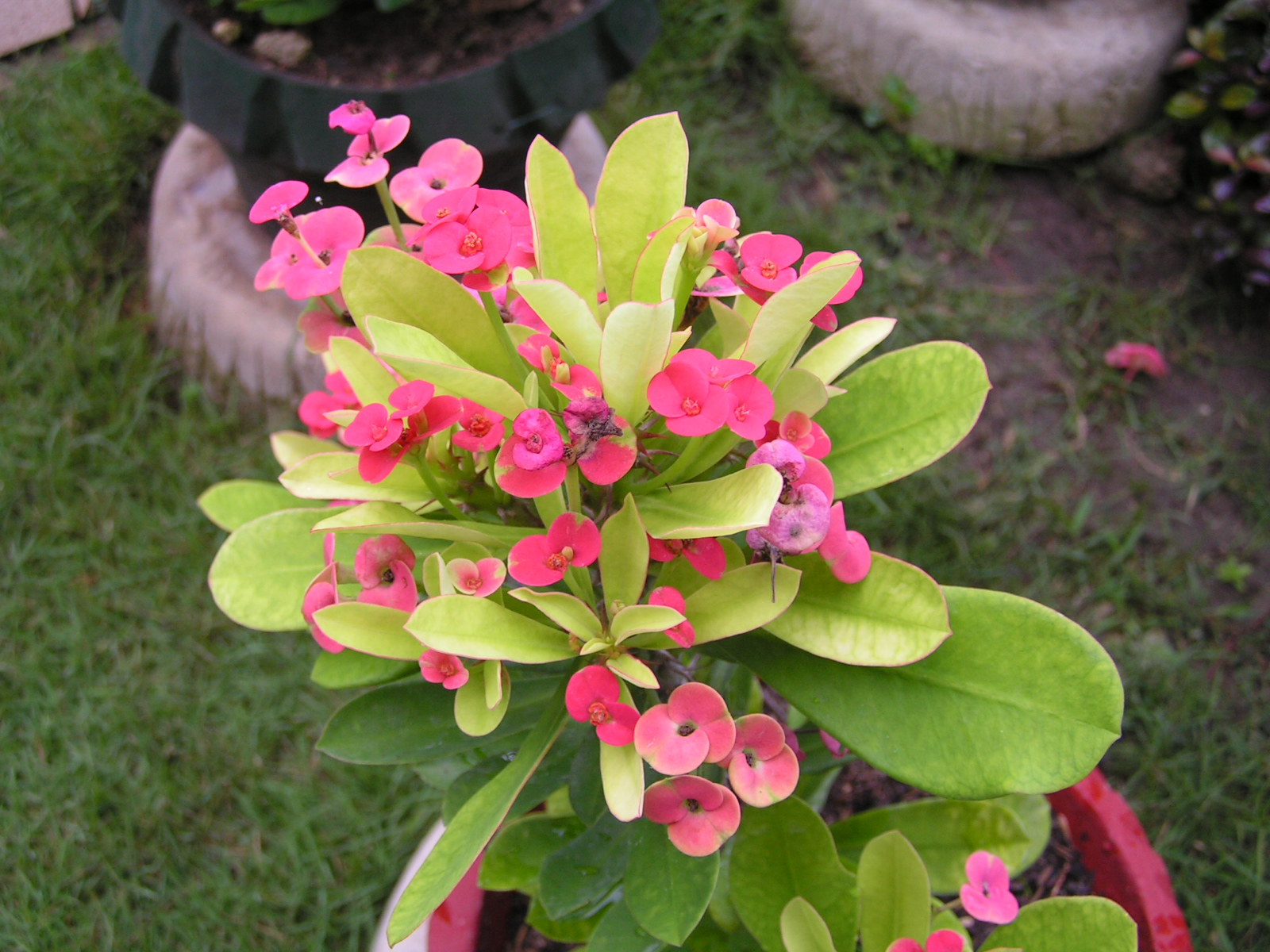
Bohol Flora 3

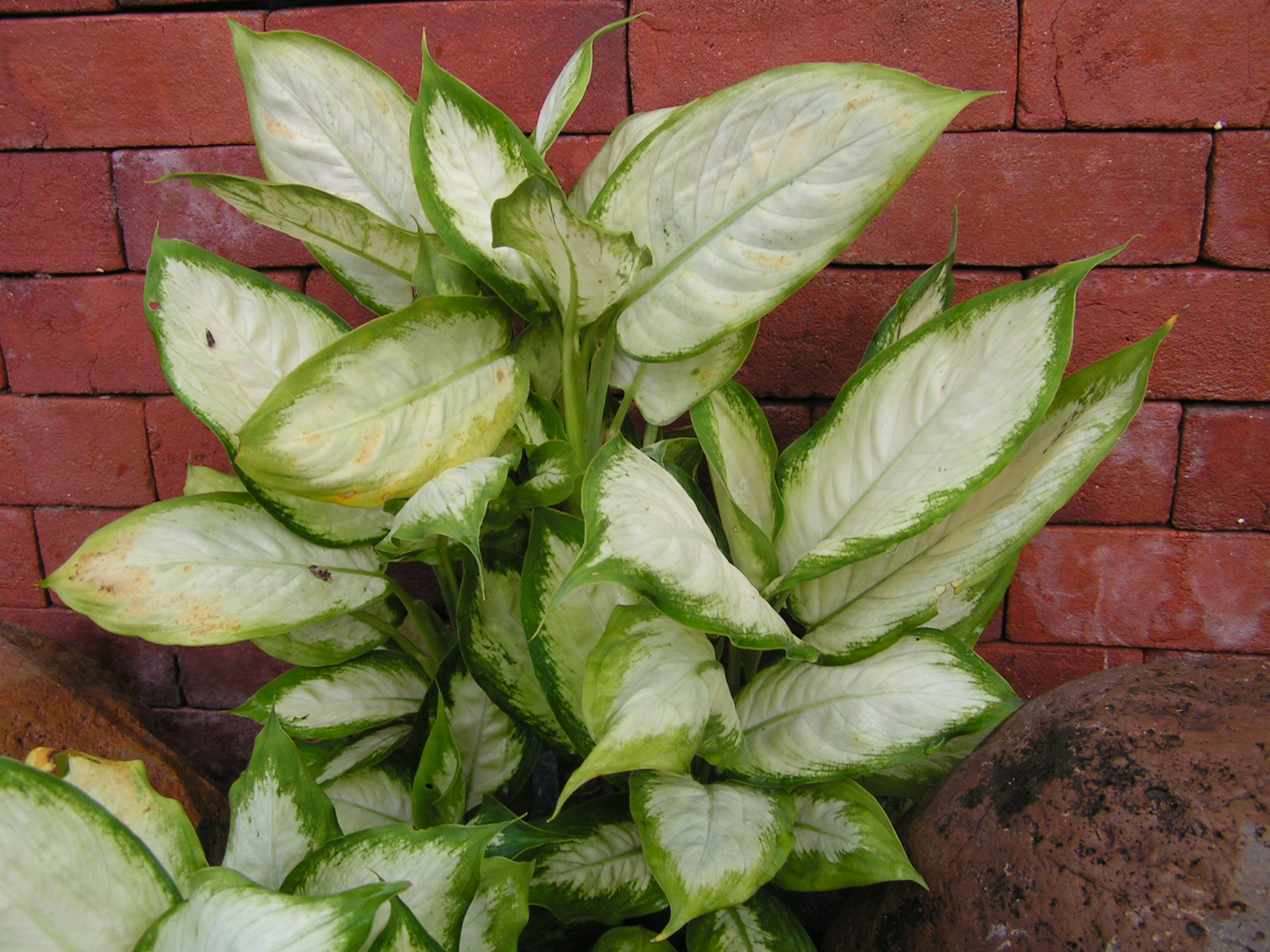
Bohol Flora 4

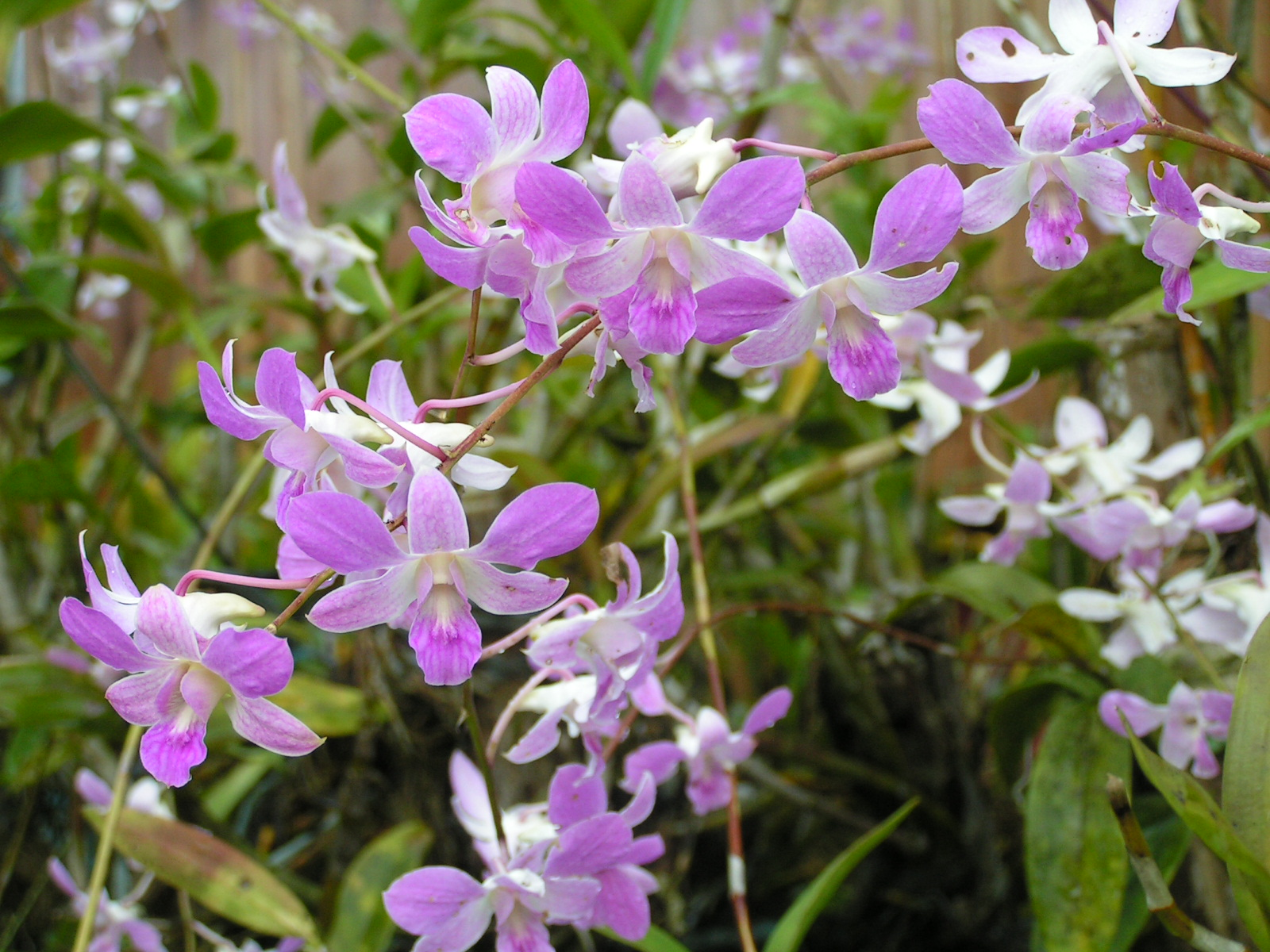
Bohol Flora 5

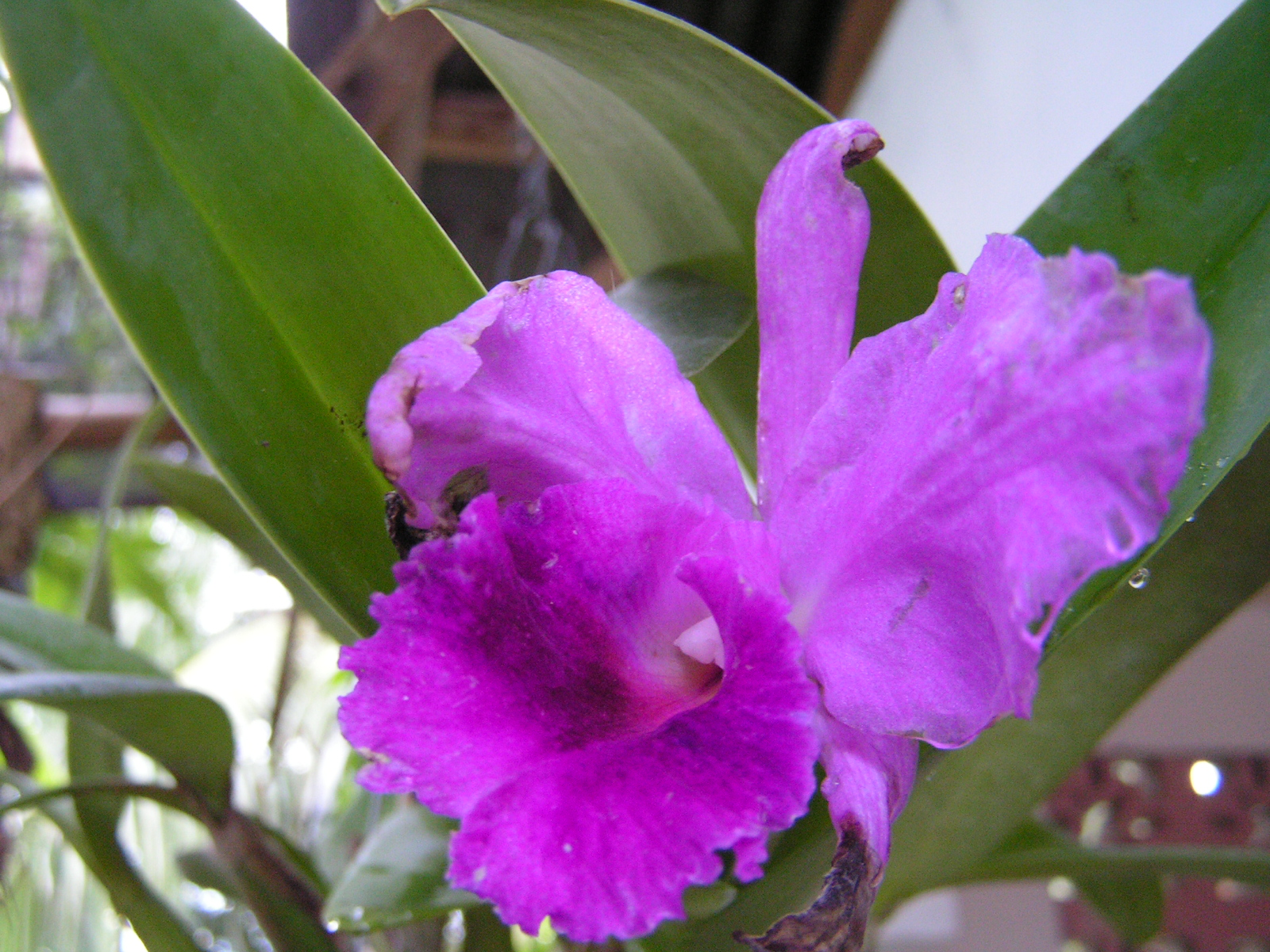
Bohol Flora 6

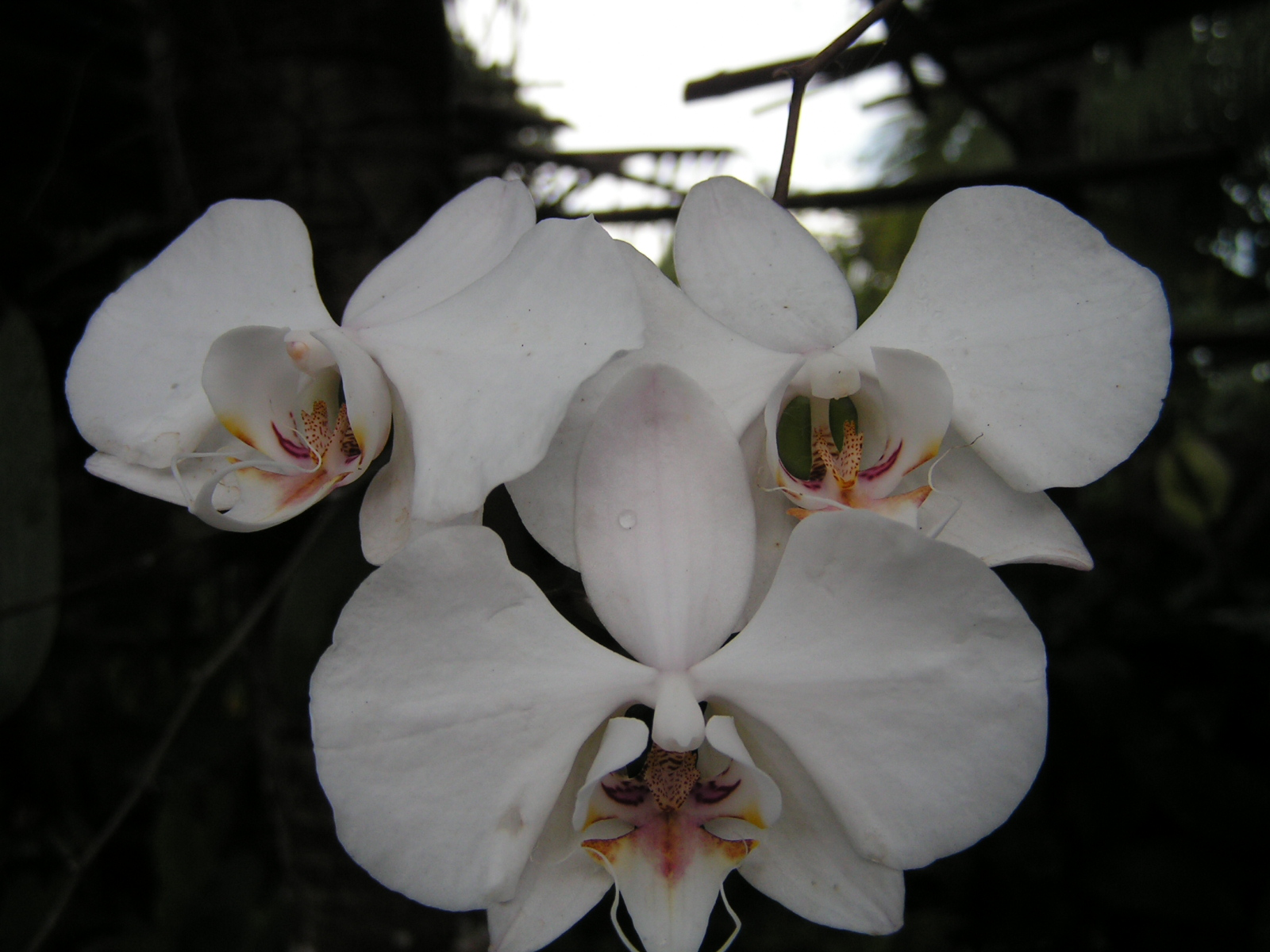
Bohol Flora 7

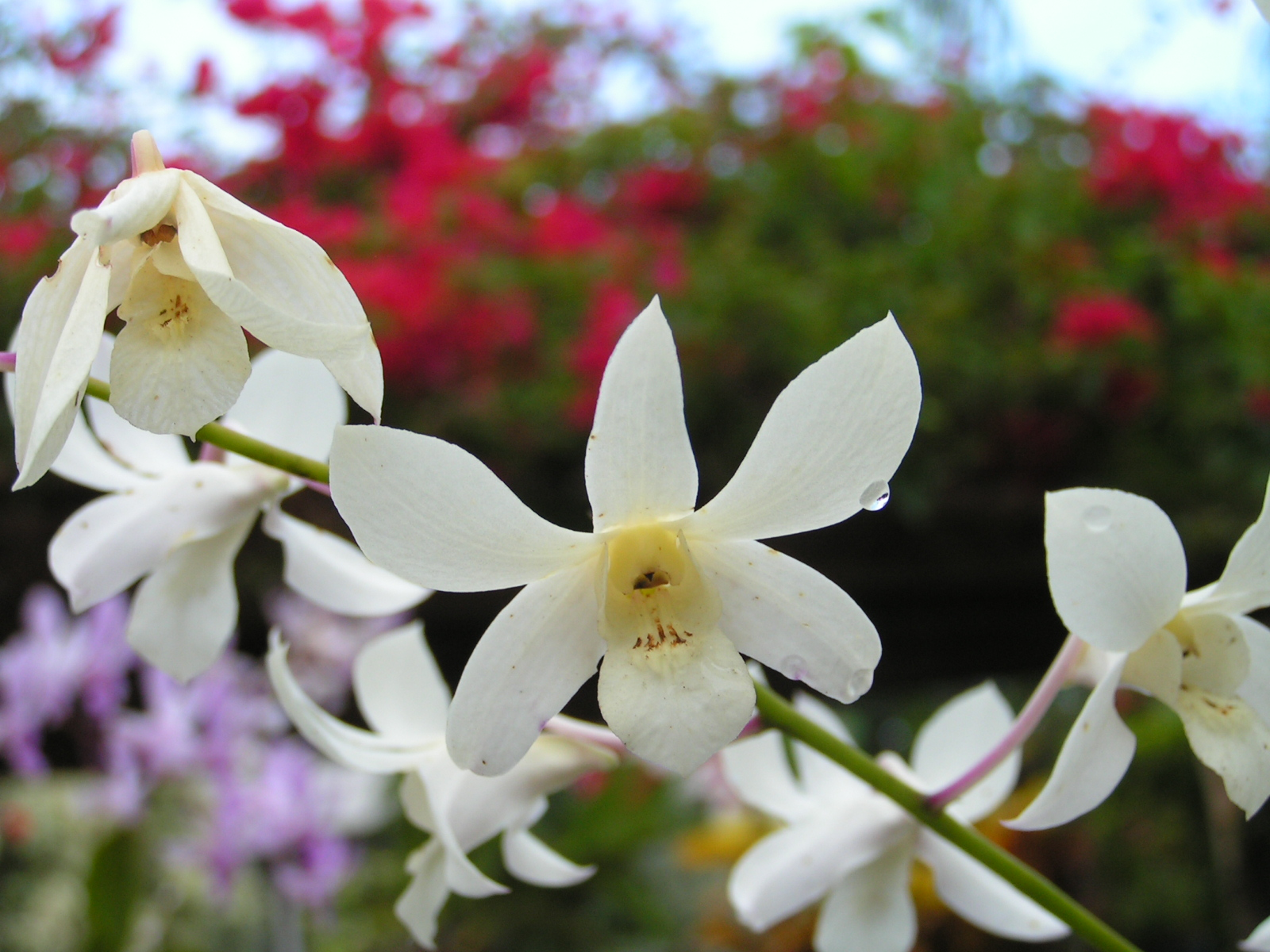
Bohol Flora 8

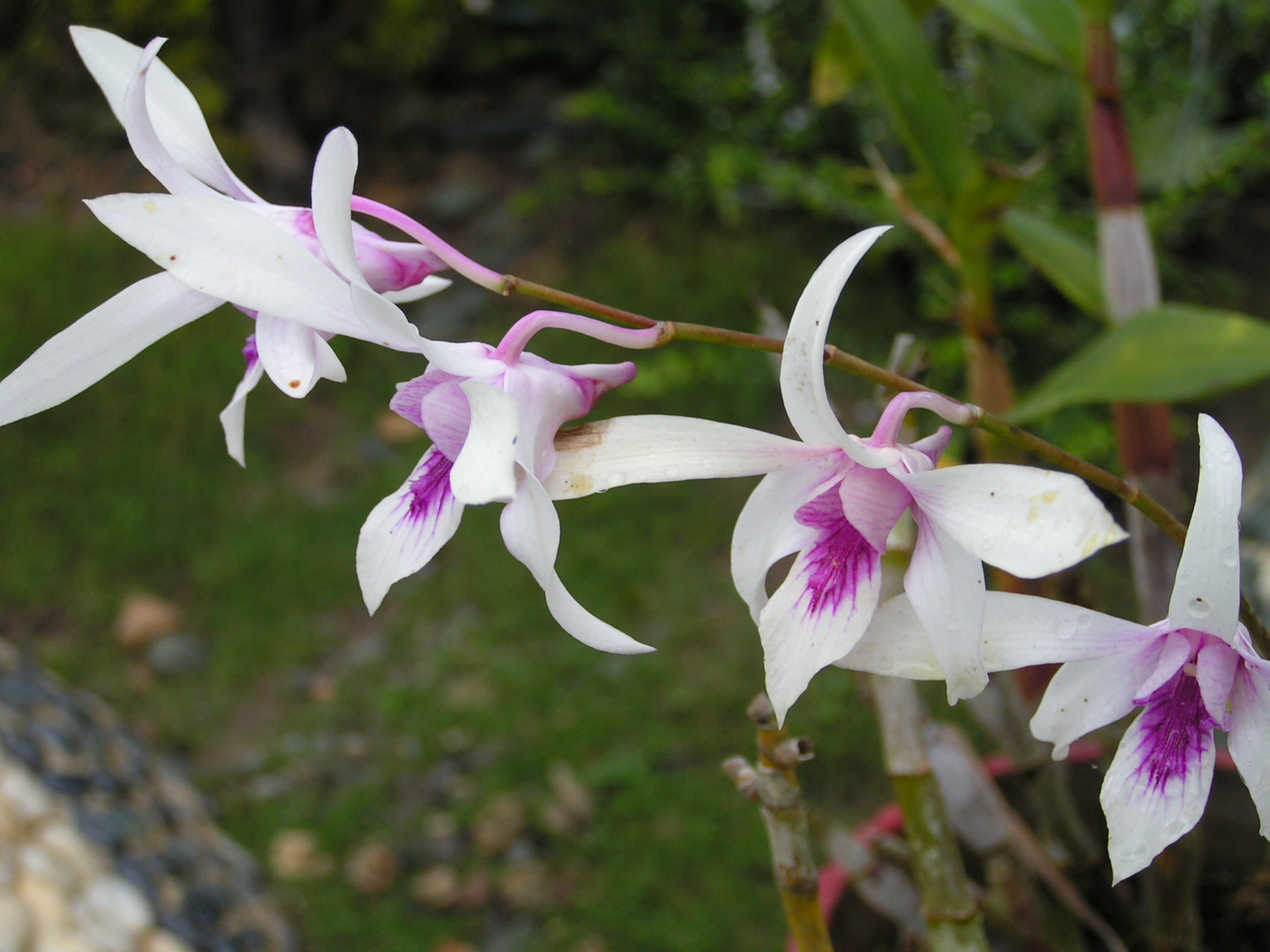
Bohol Flora 9

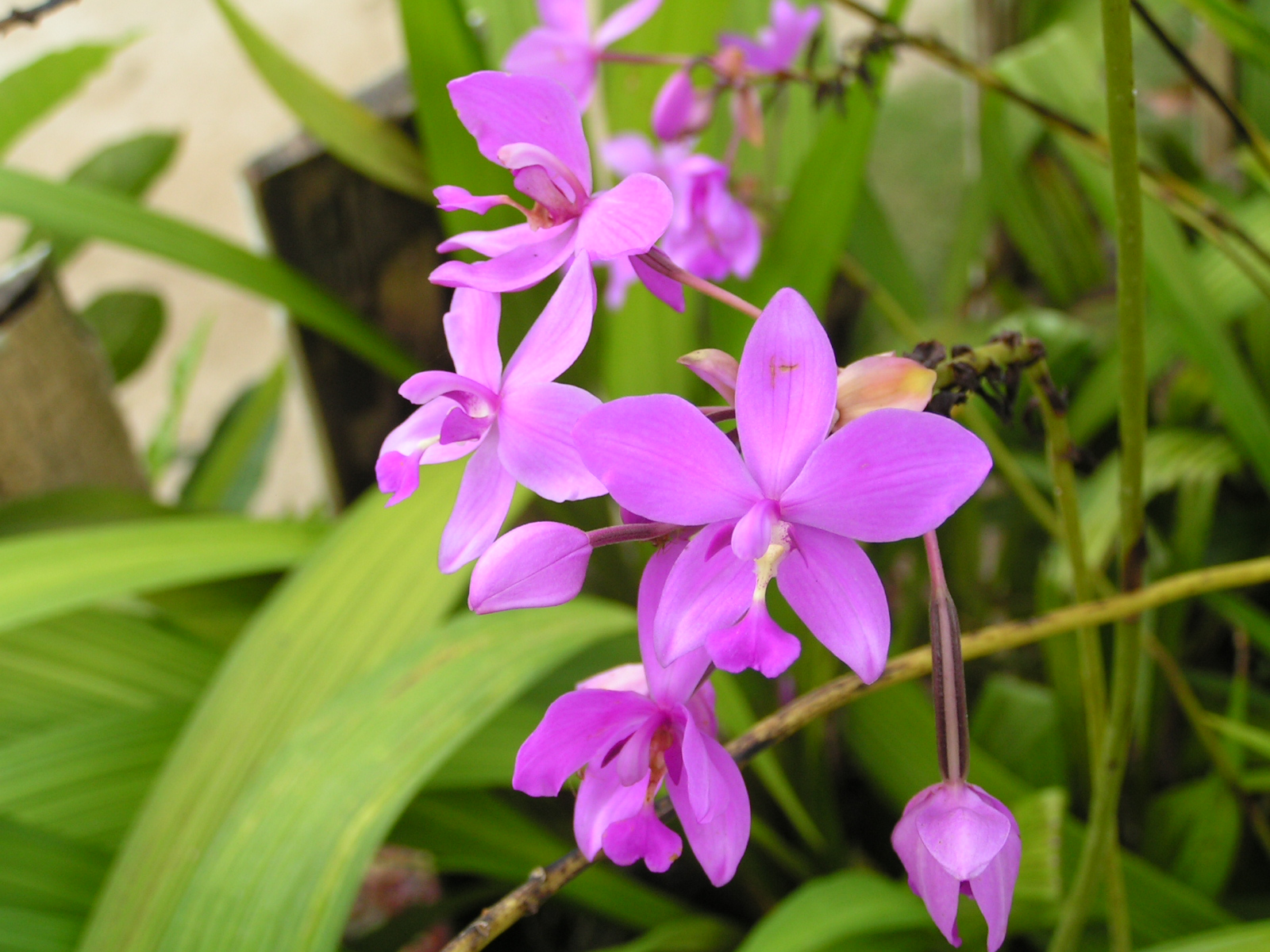
Bohol Flora 10

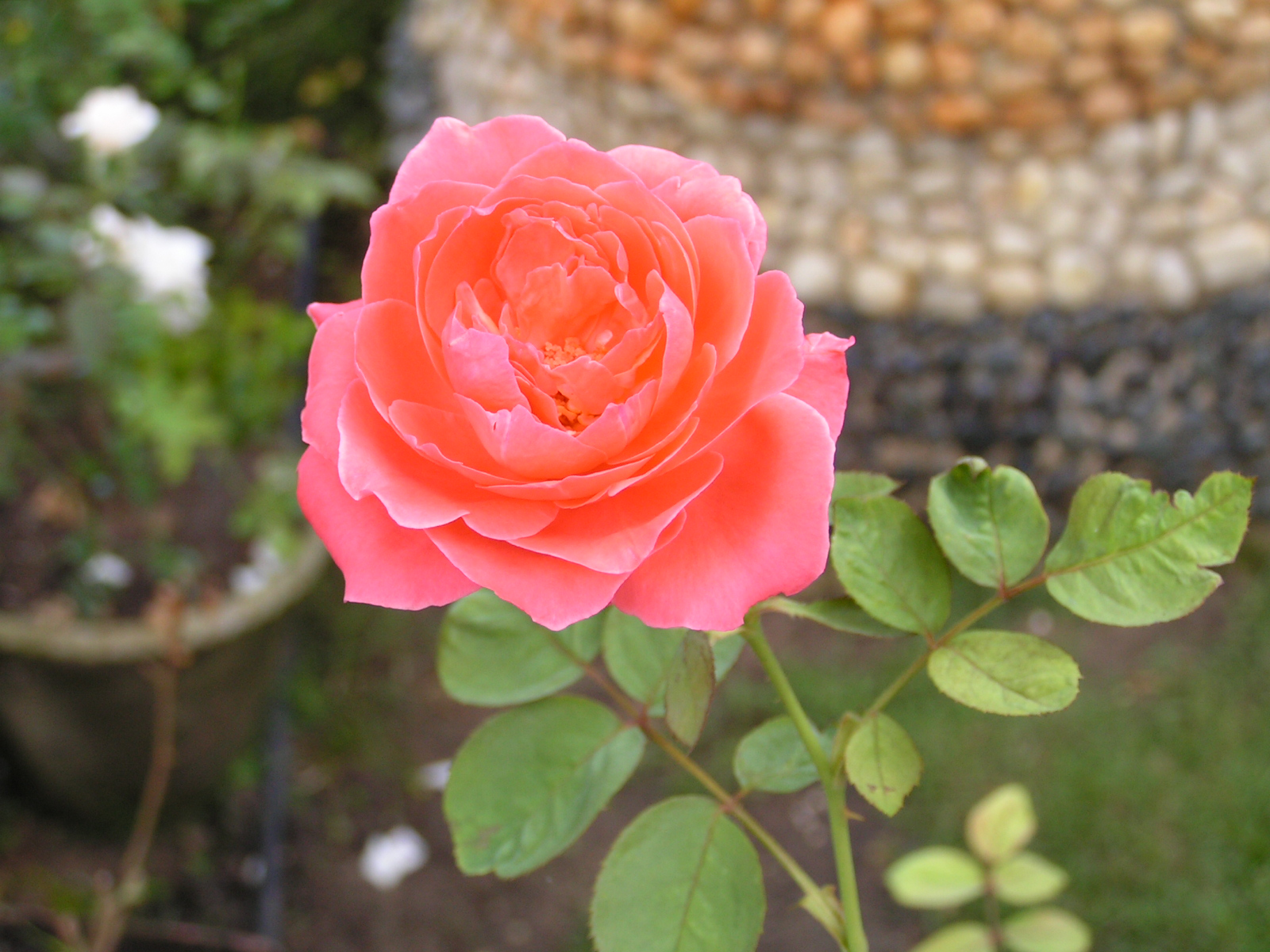
Rose

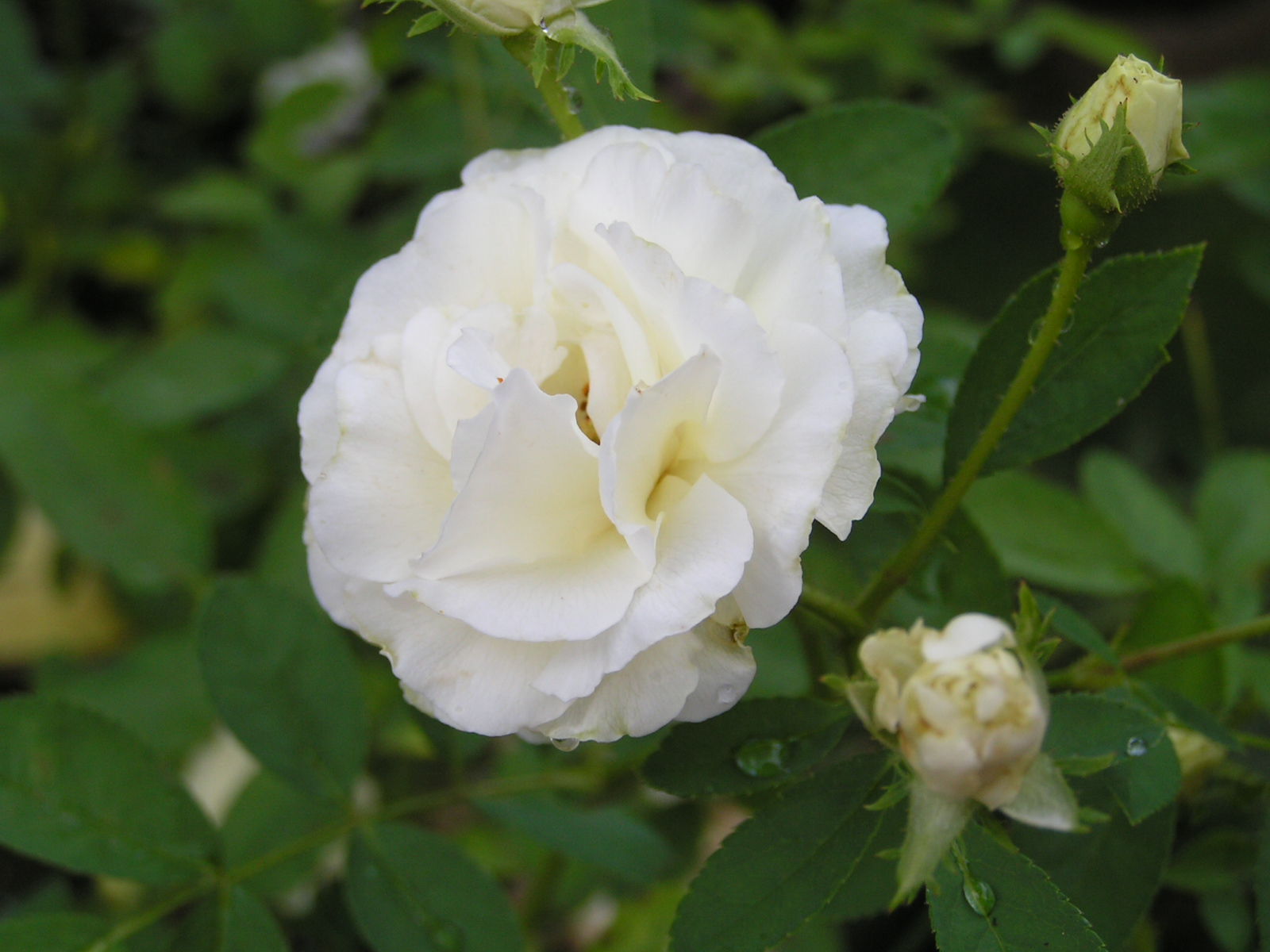
Rose

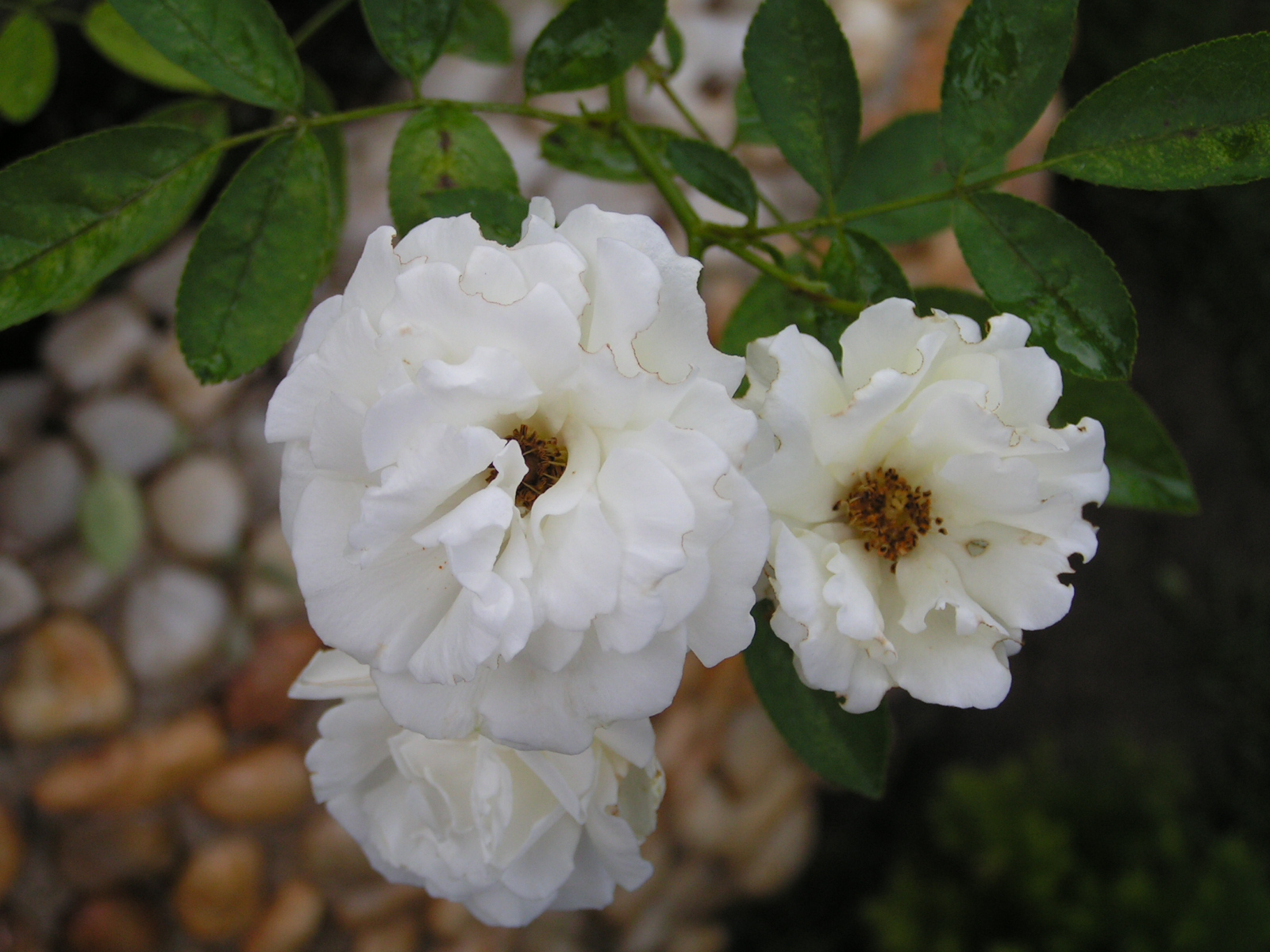
Rose

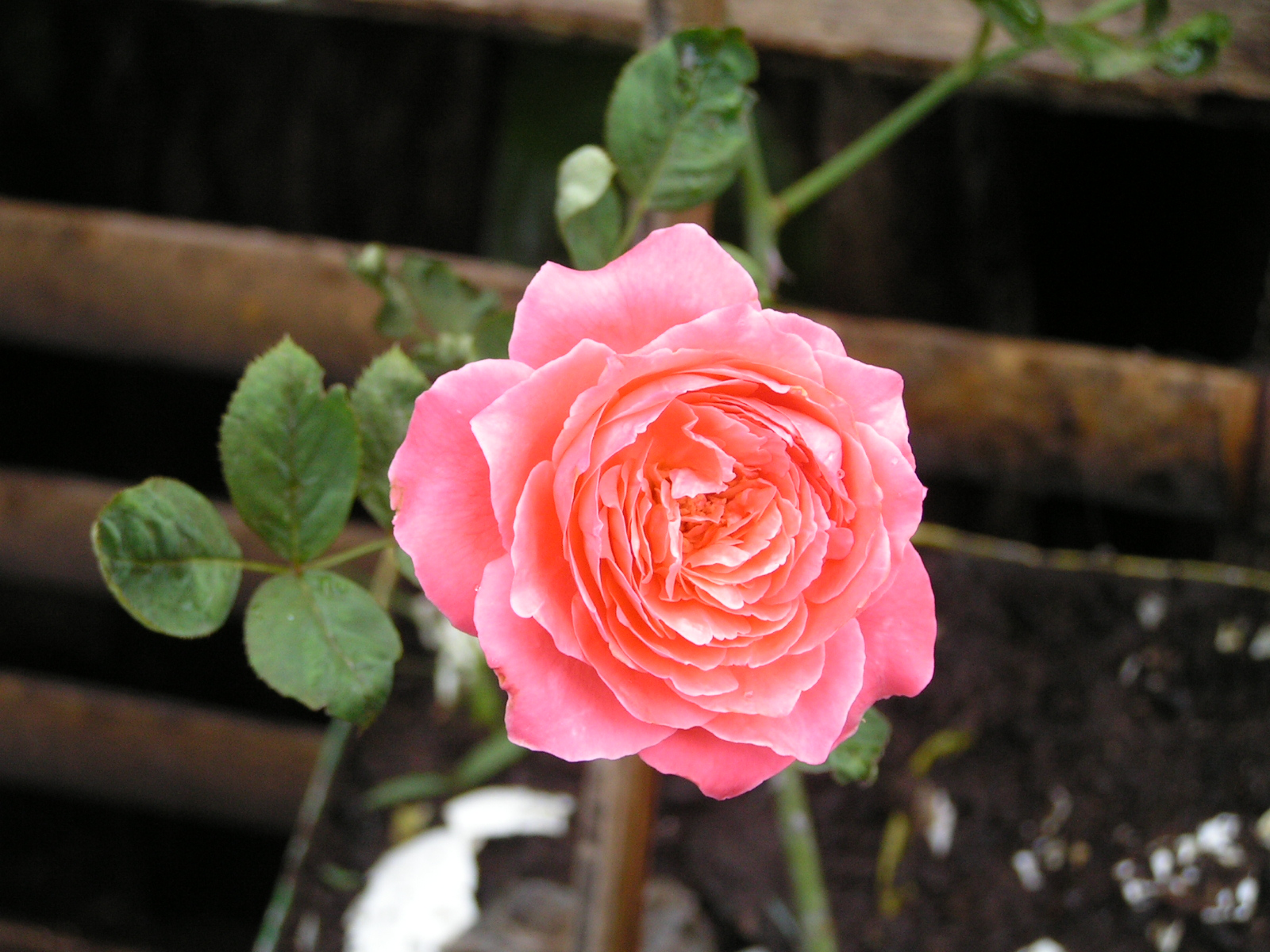
Rose

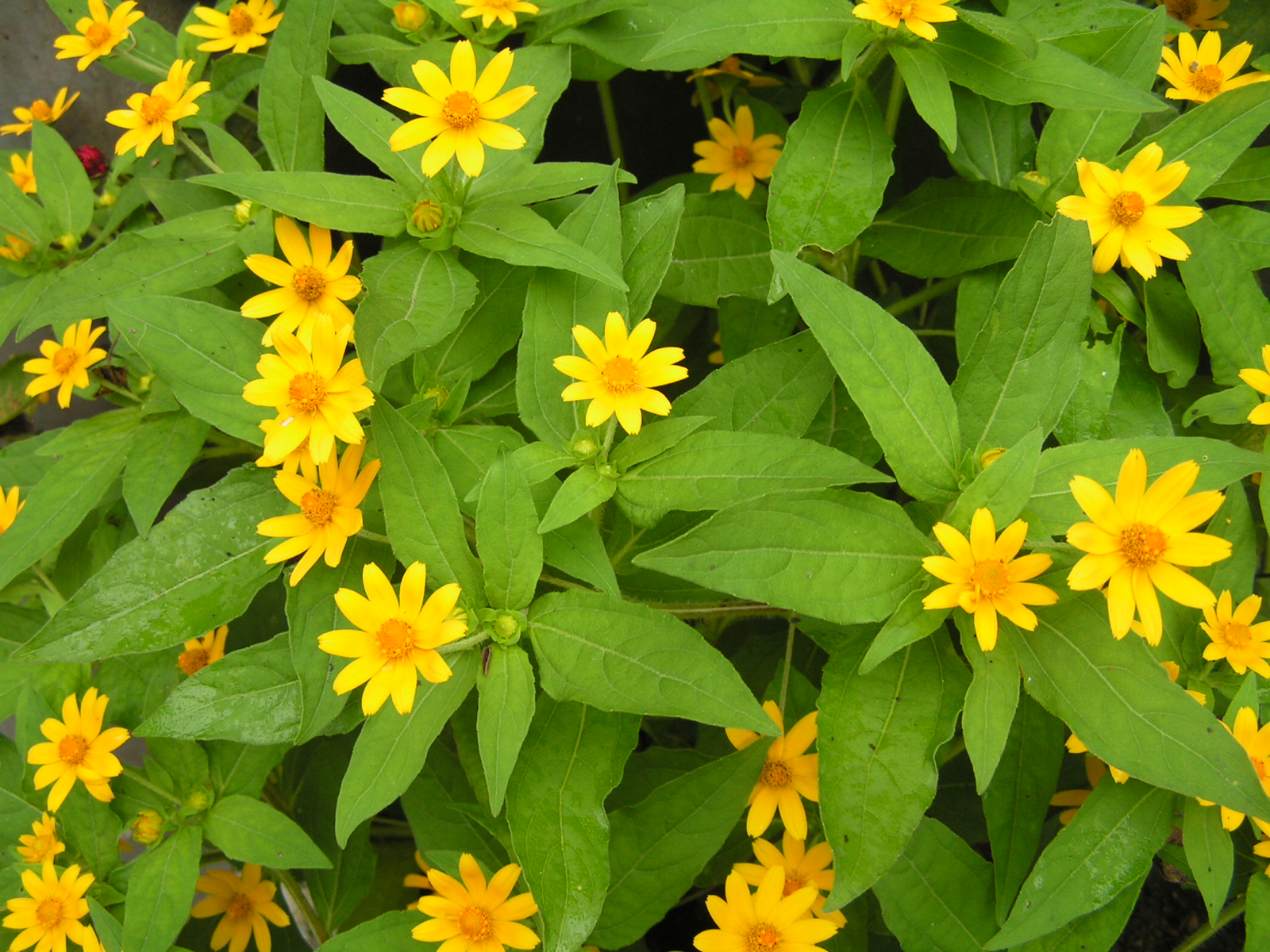
Bohol Flora 15

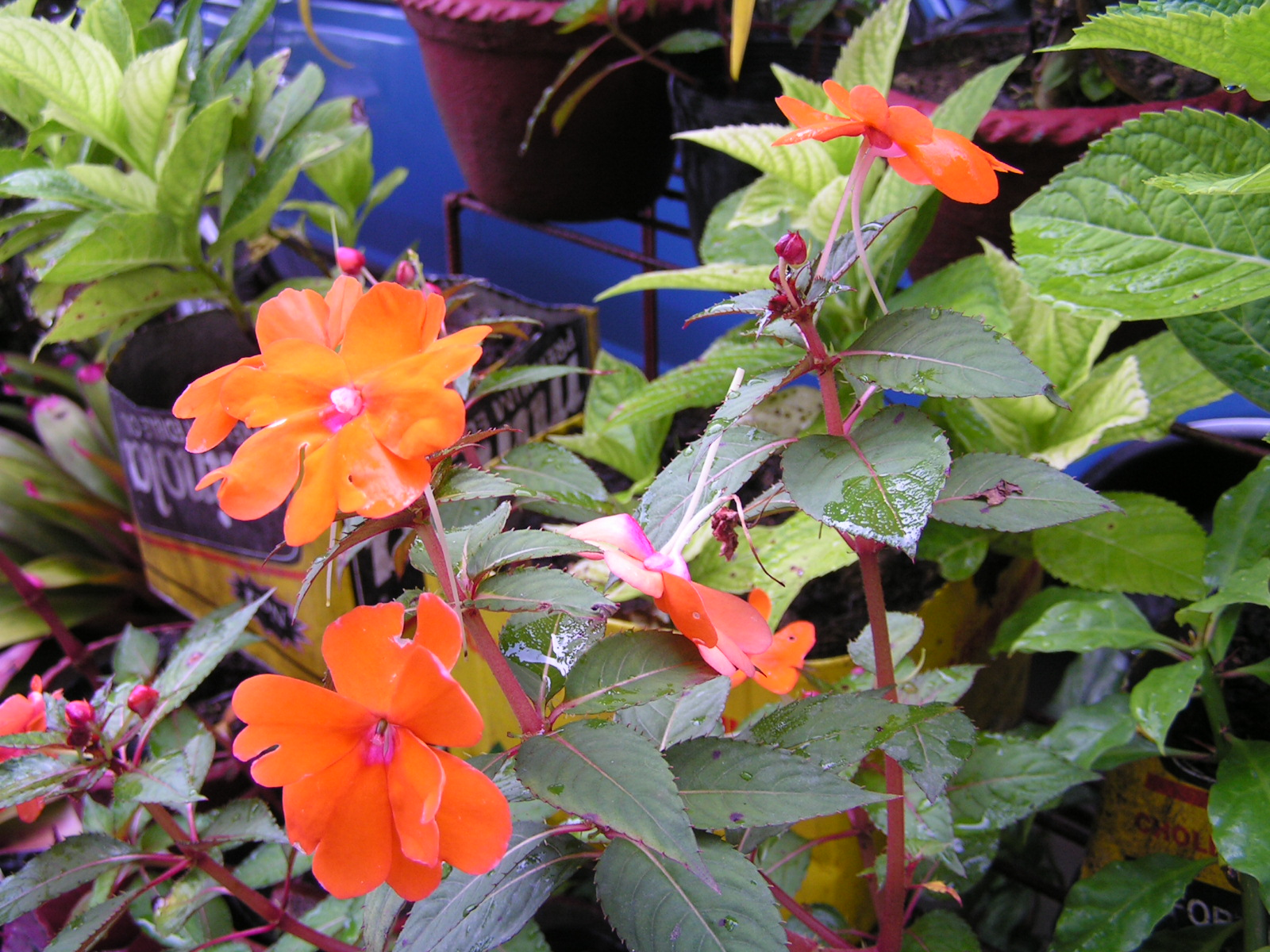
Bohol Flora 16

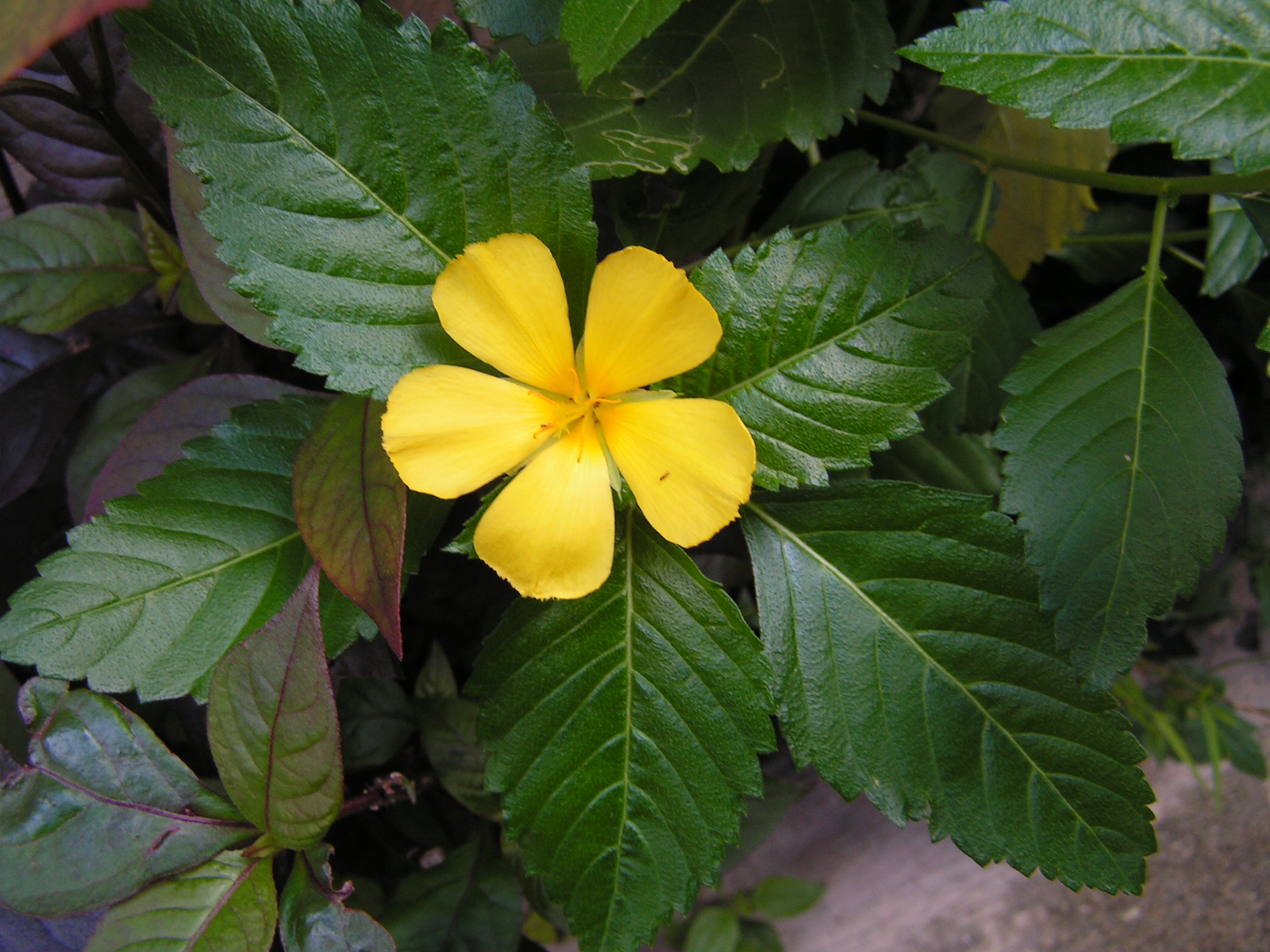
Bohol Flora 17

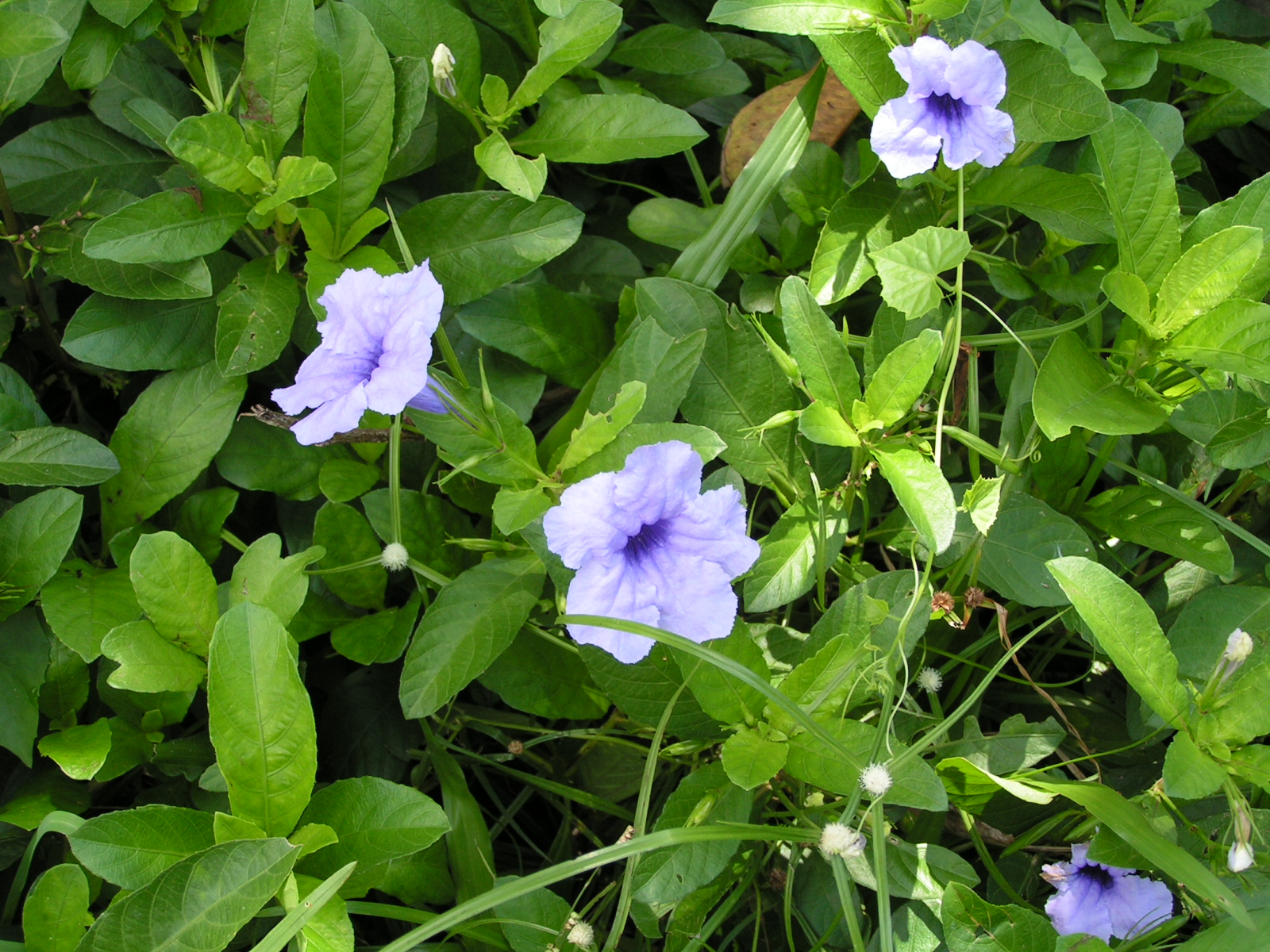
Bohol Flora 18

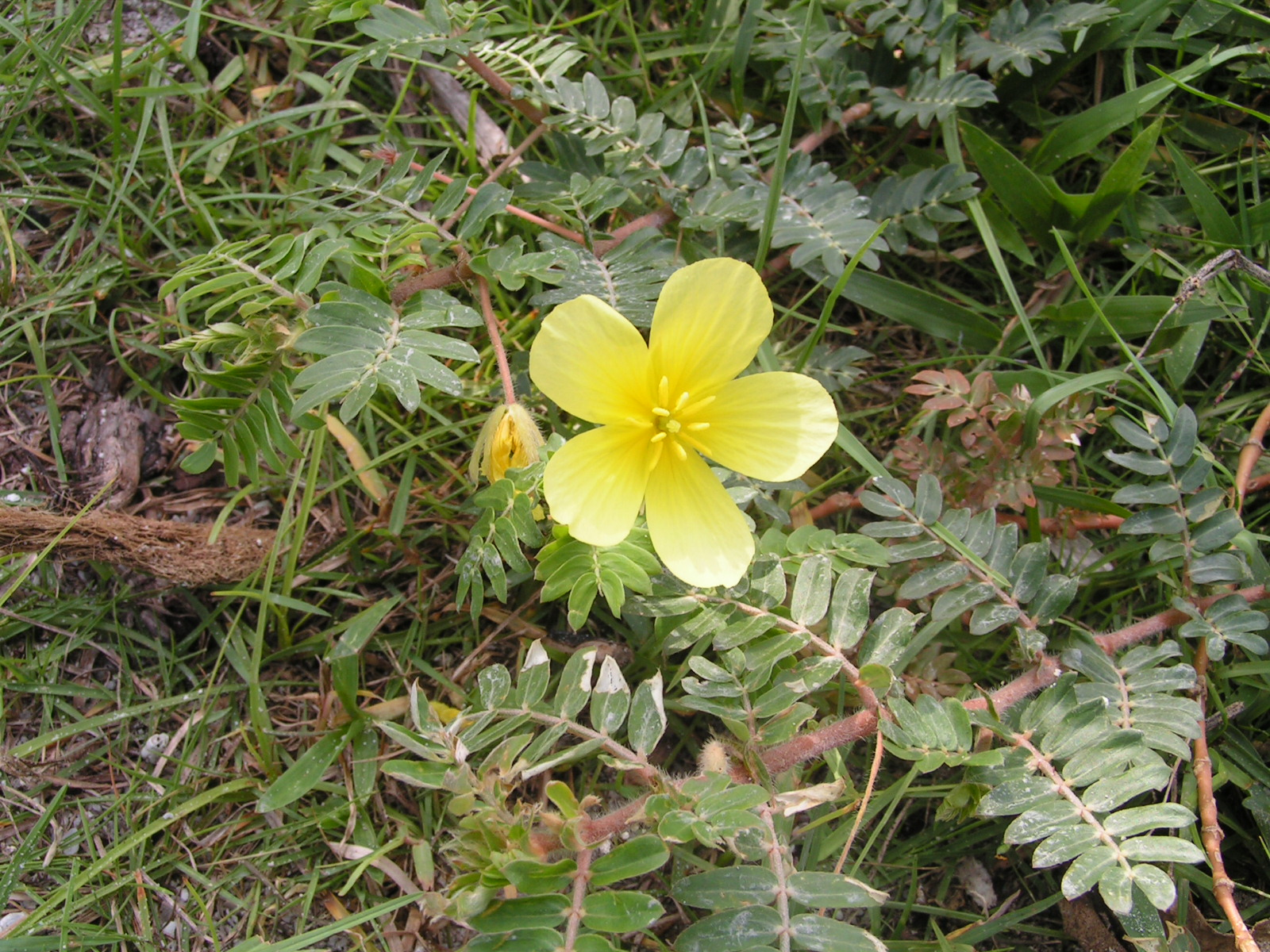
Bohol Flora 19

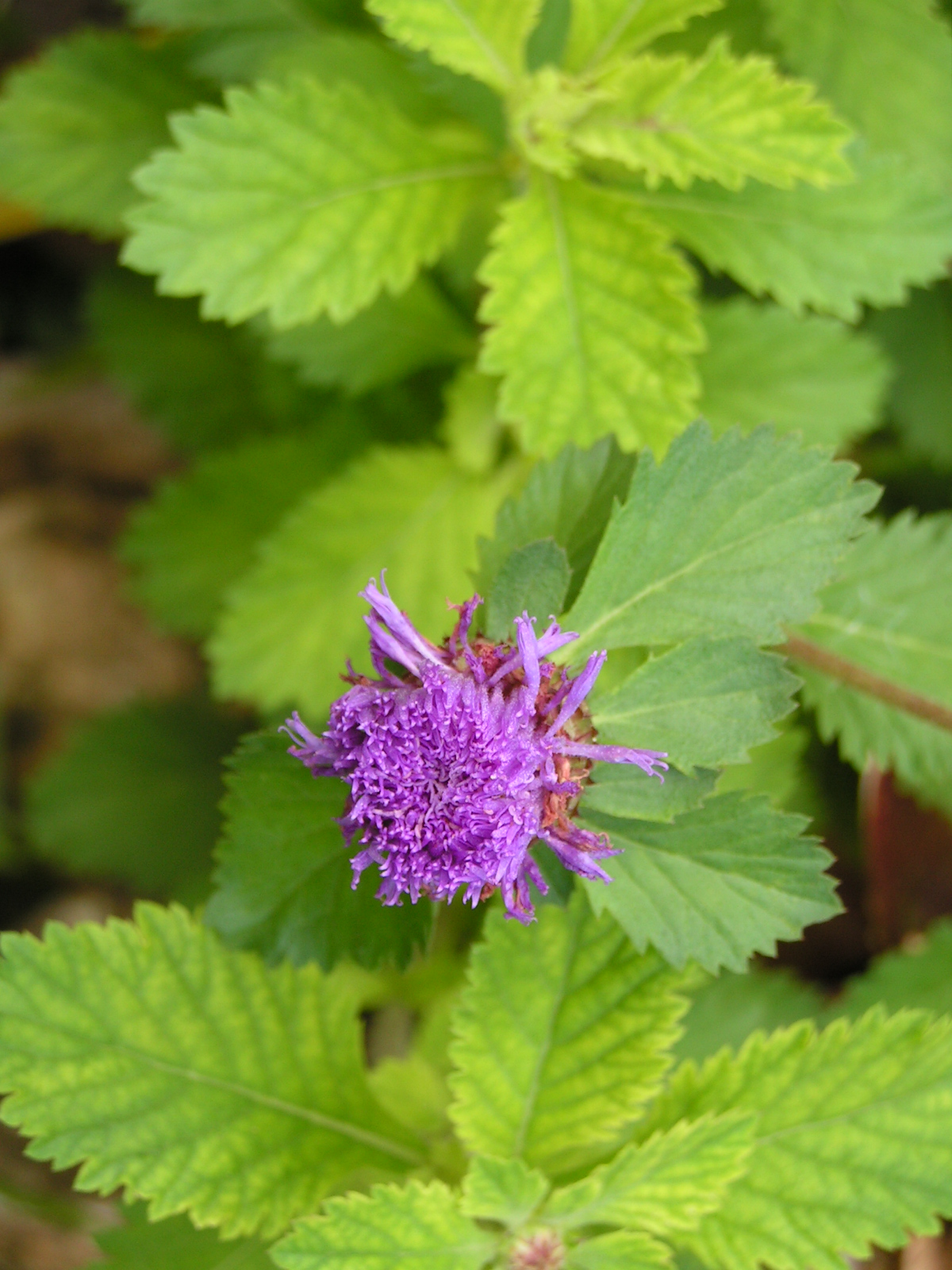
Bohol Flora 20

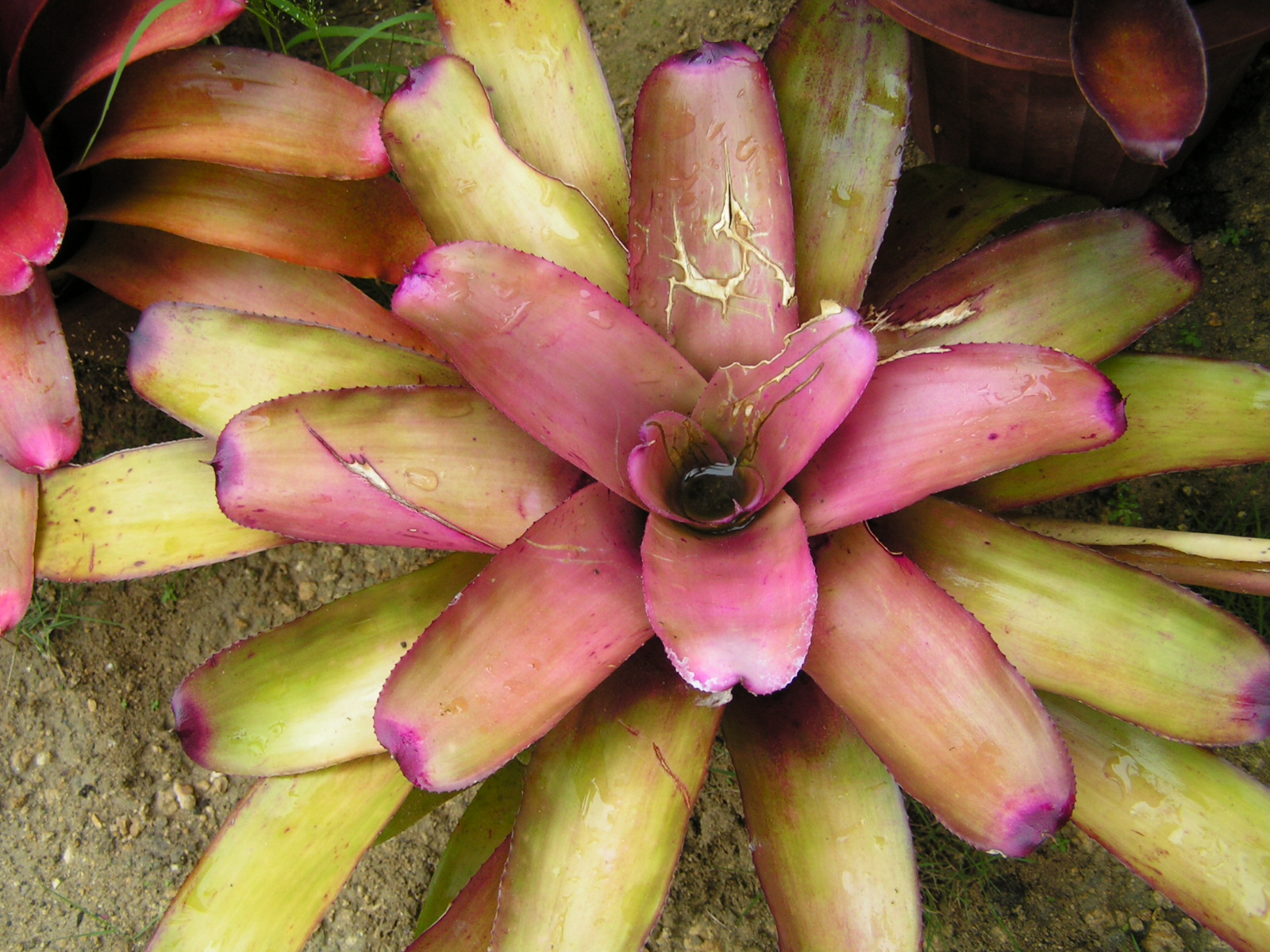
Bromeliad1

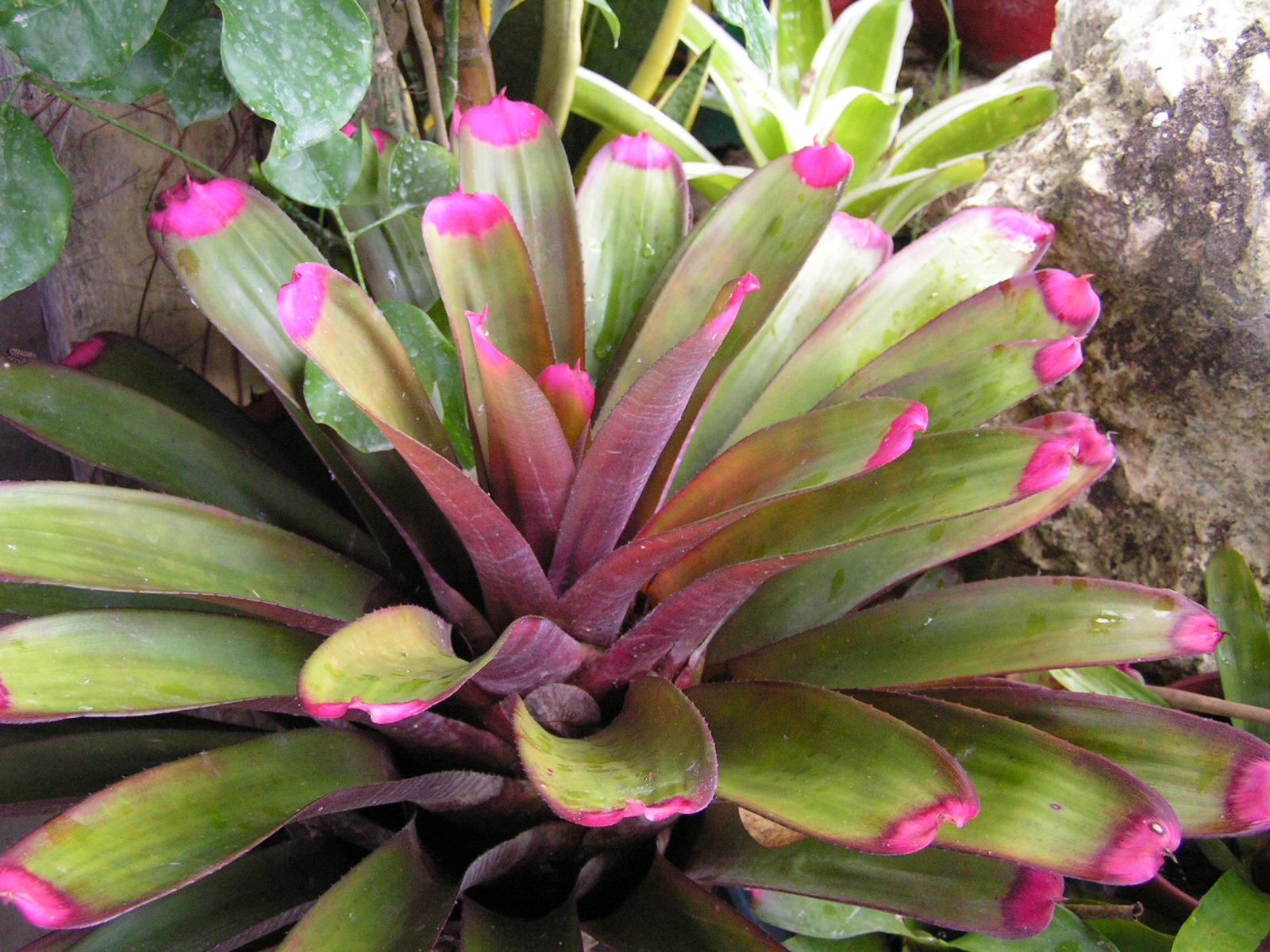
Bromeliad2

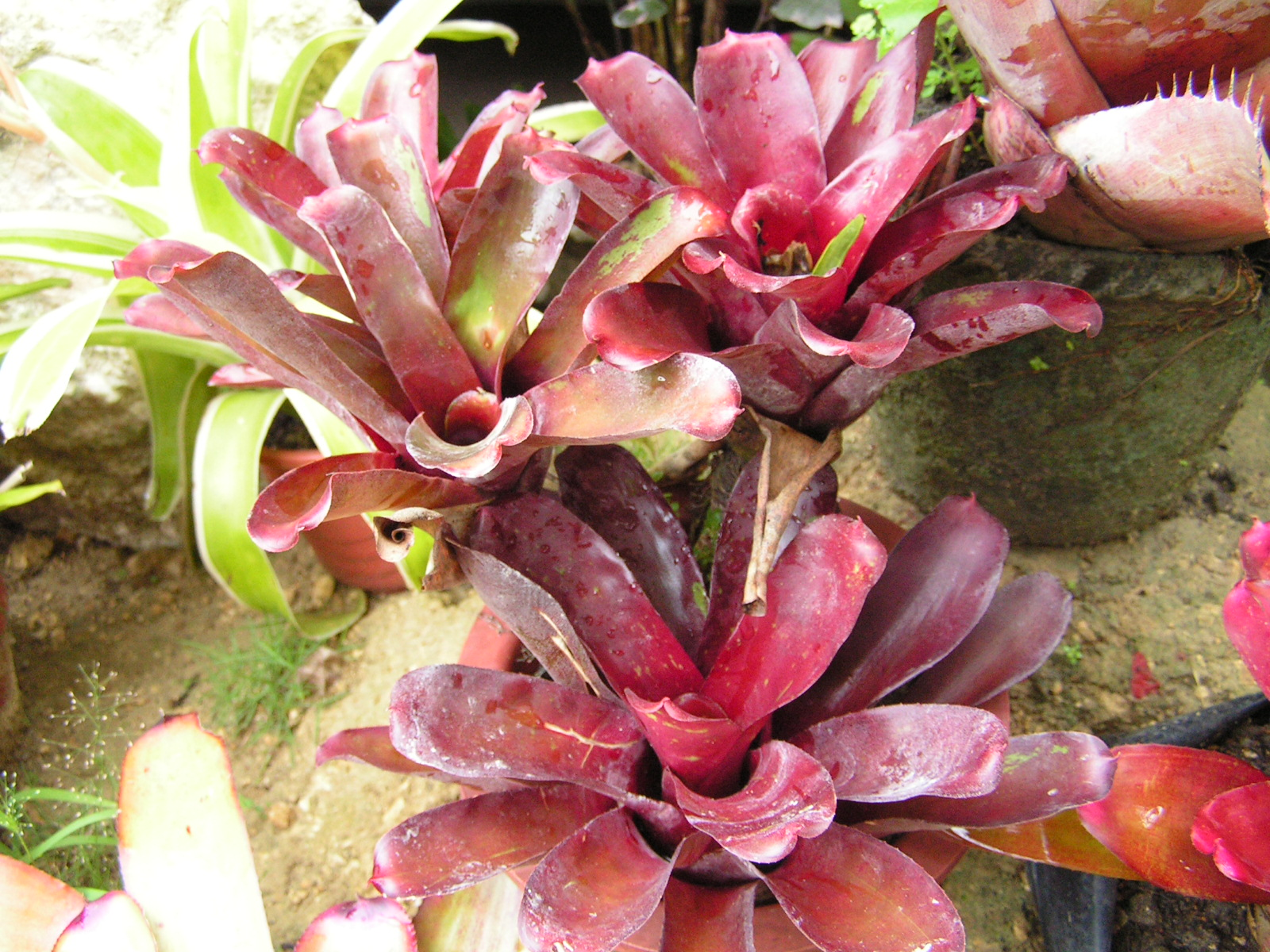
Bromeliad3

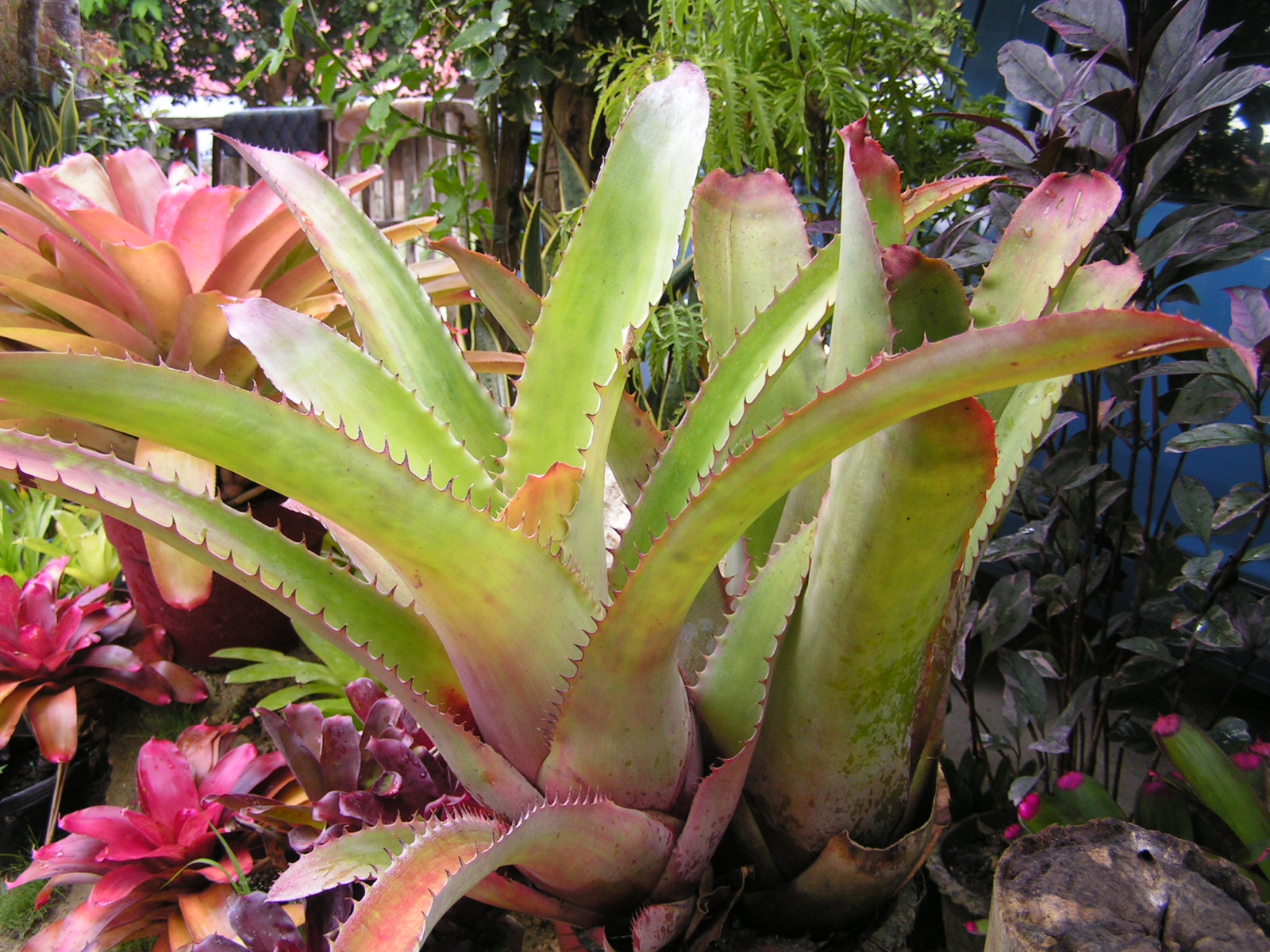
Bromeliad4

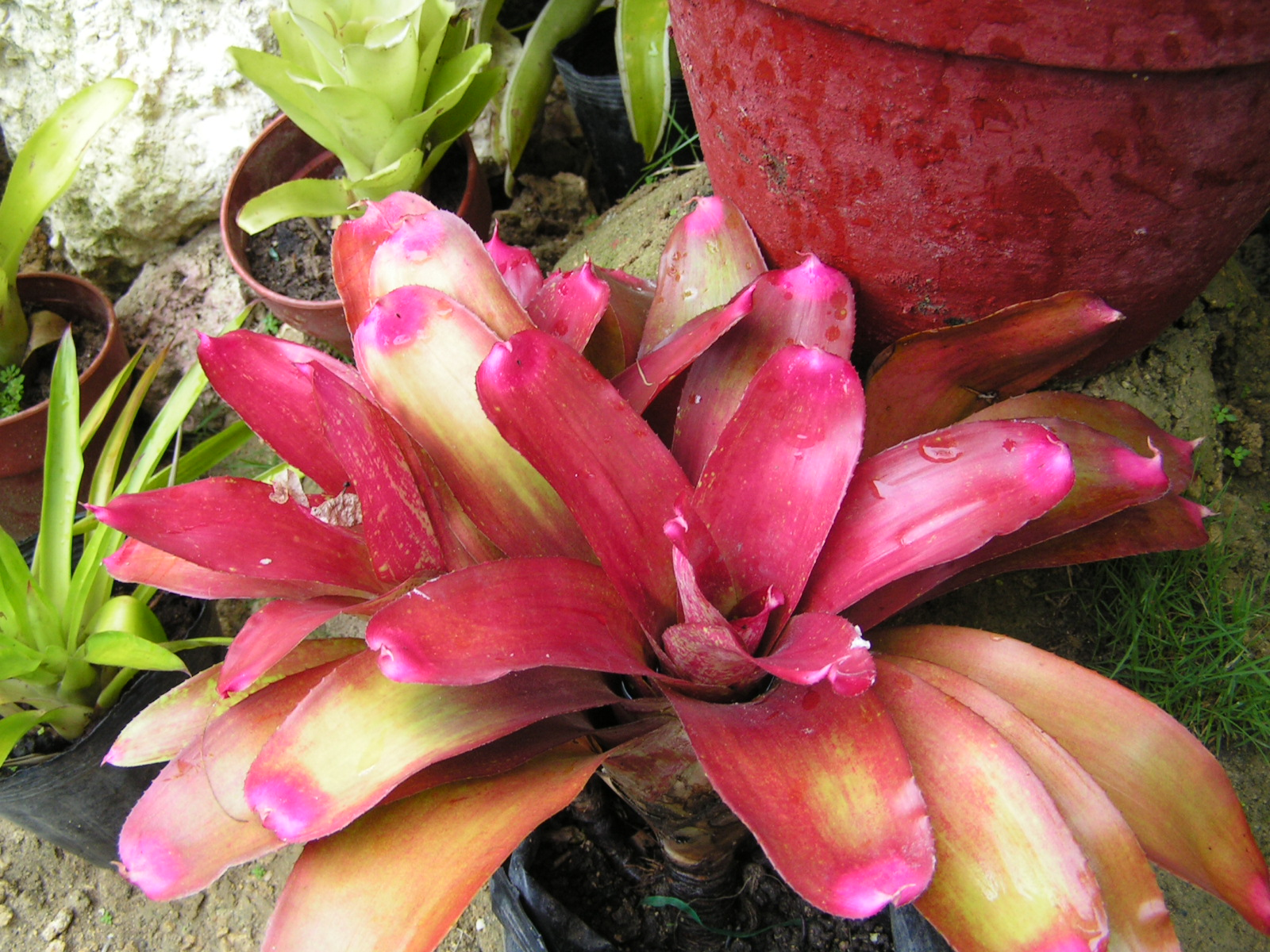
Bromeliad5

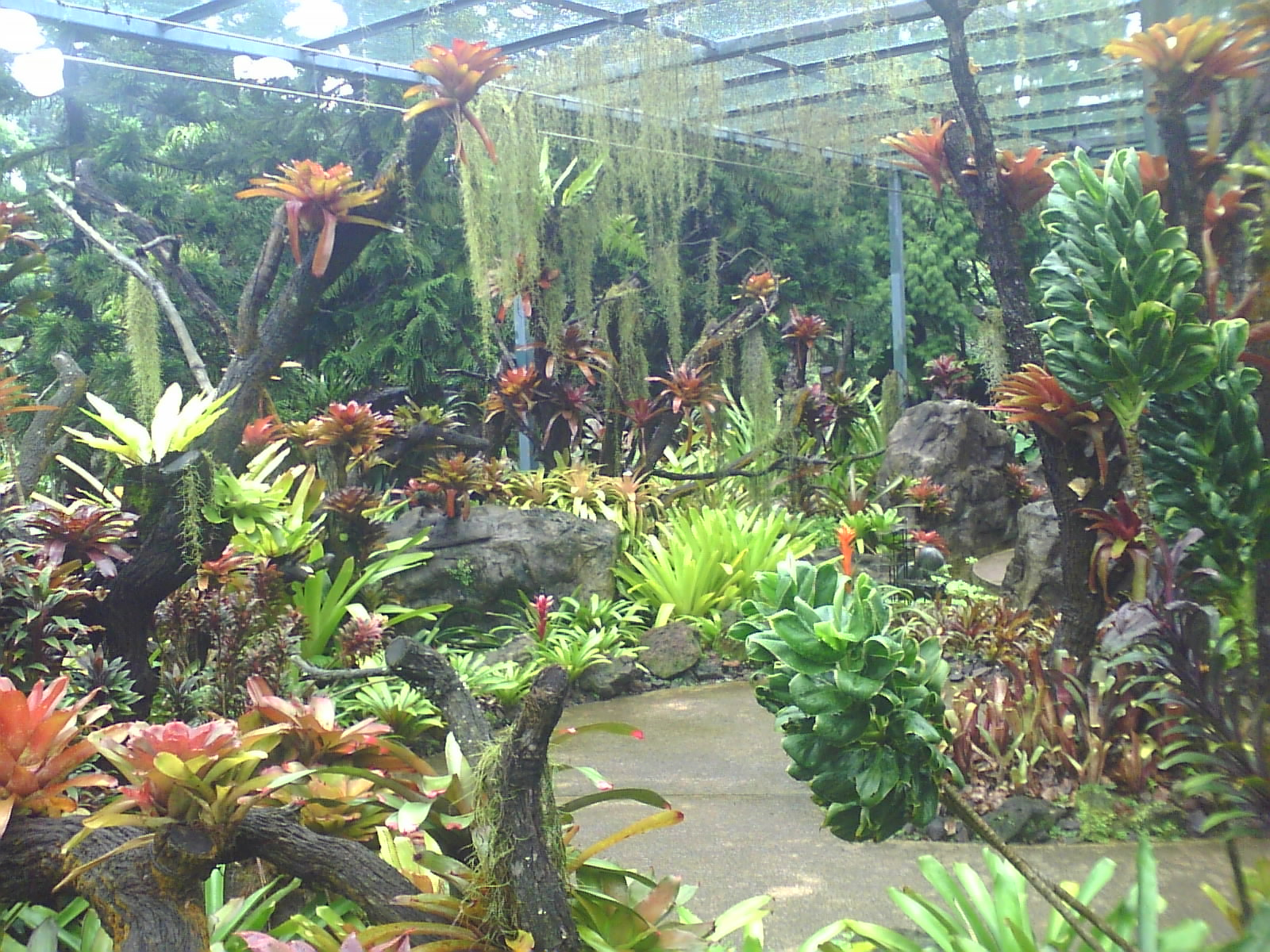
Bromeliad6

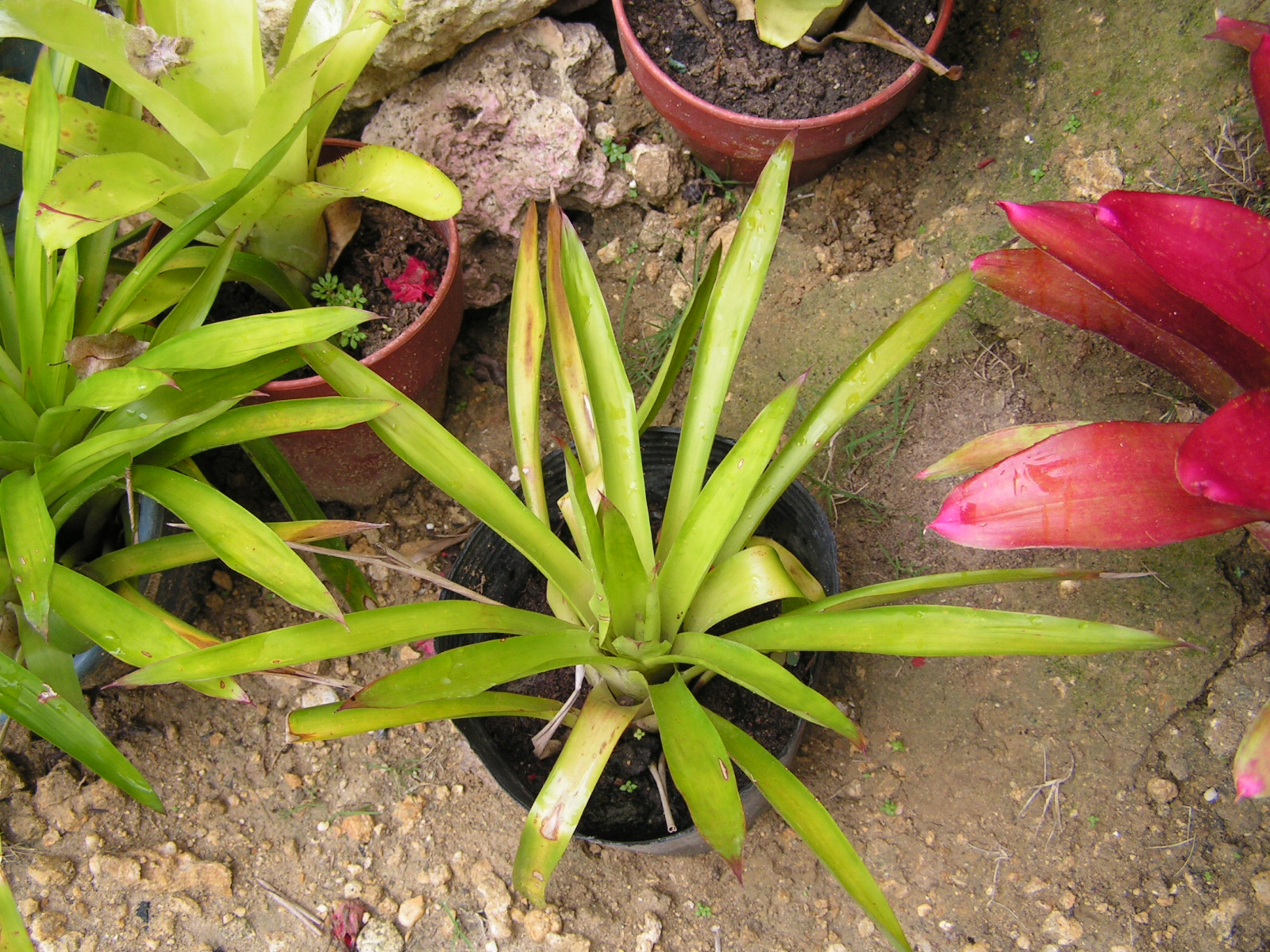
Bromeliad7

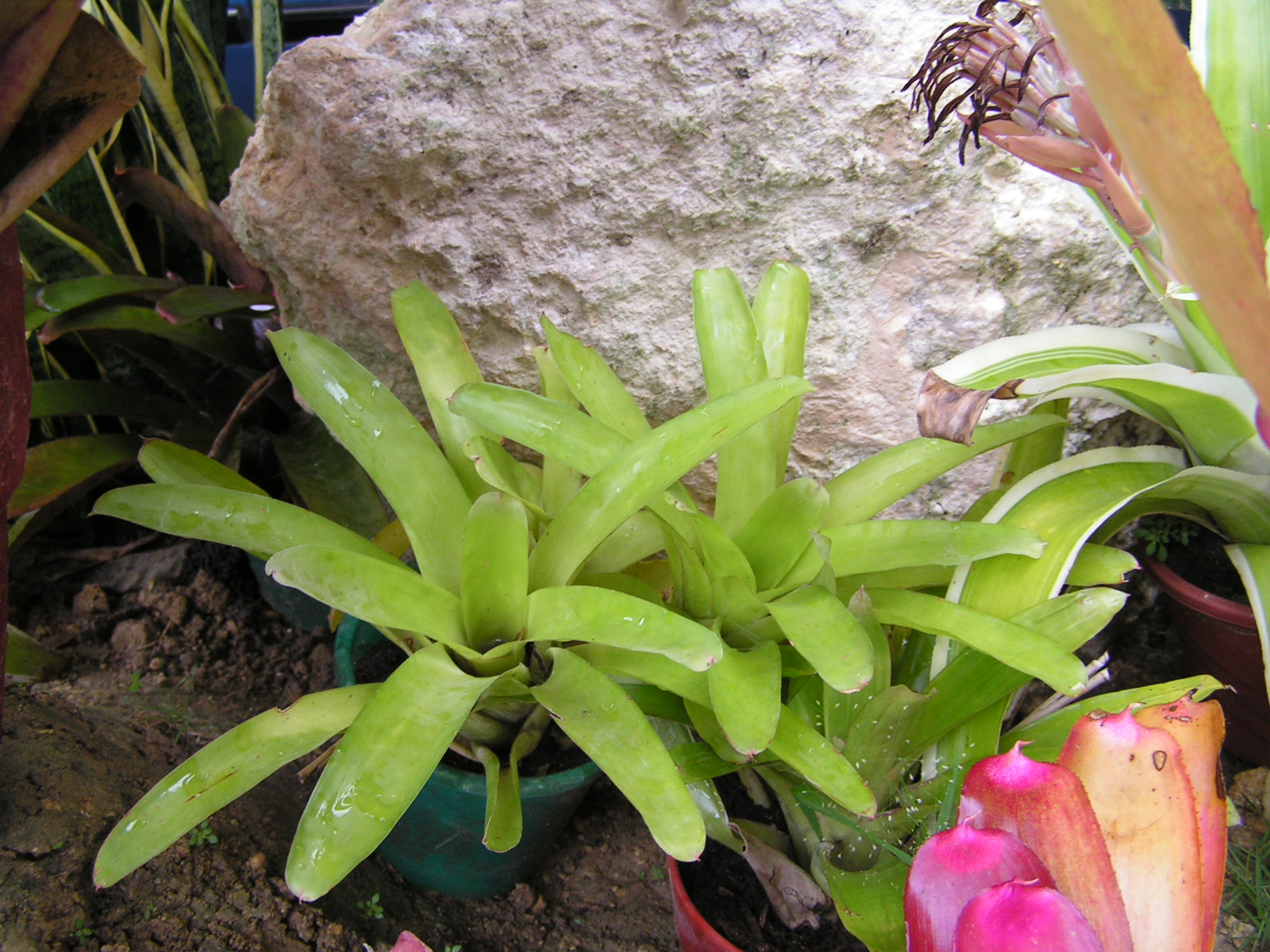
Bromeliad8

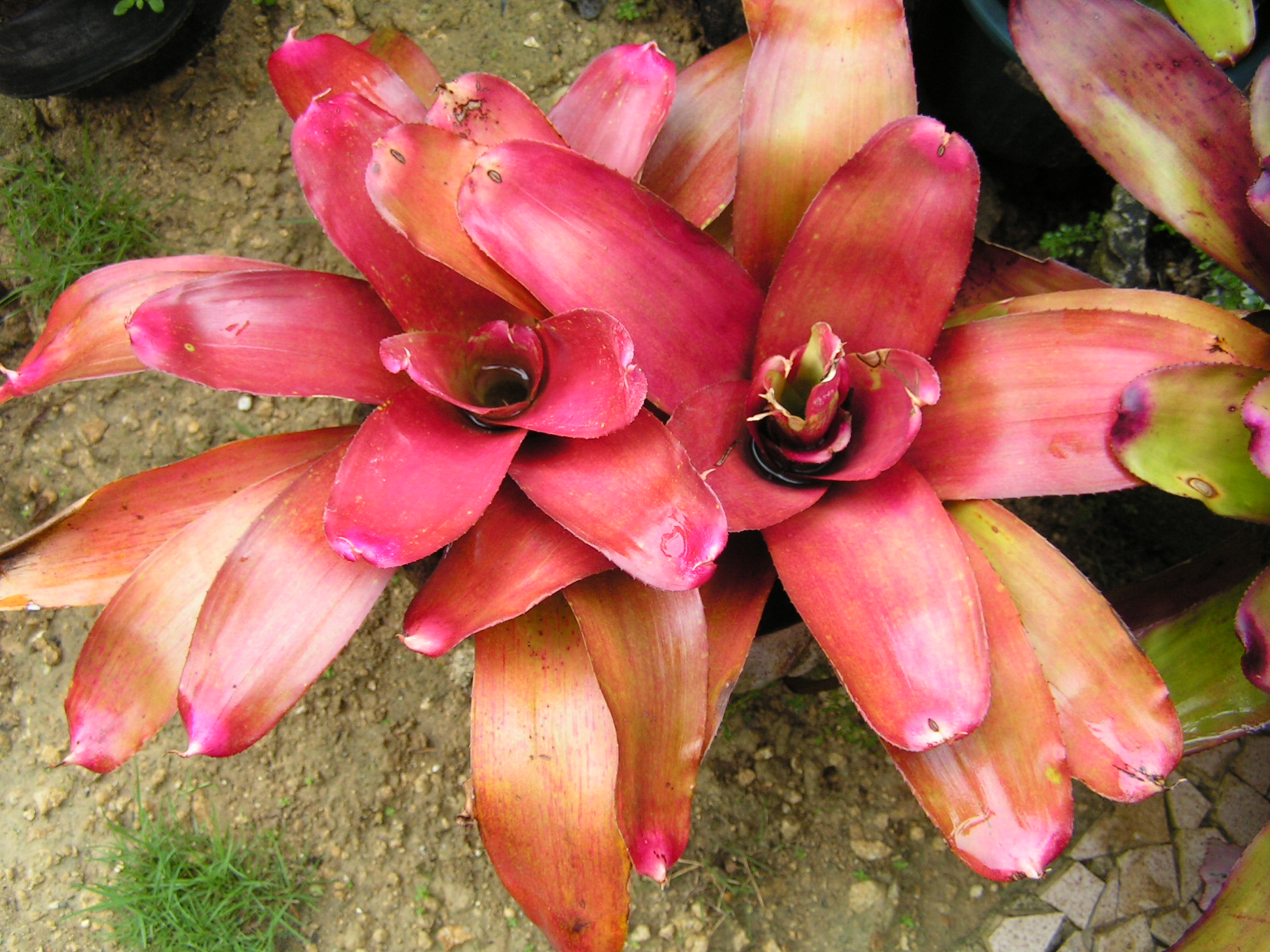
Bromeliad9

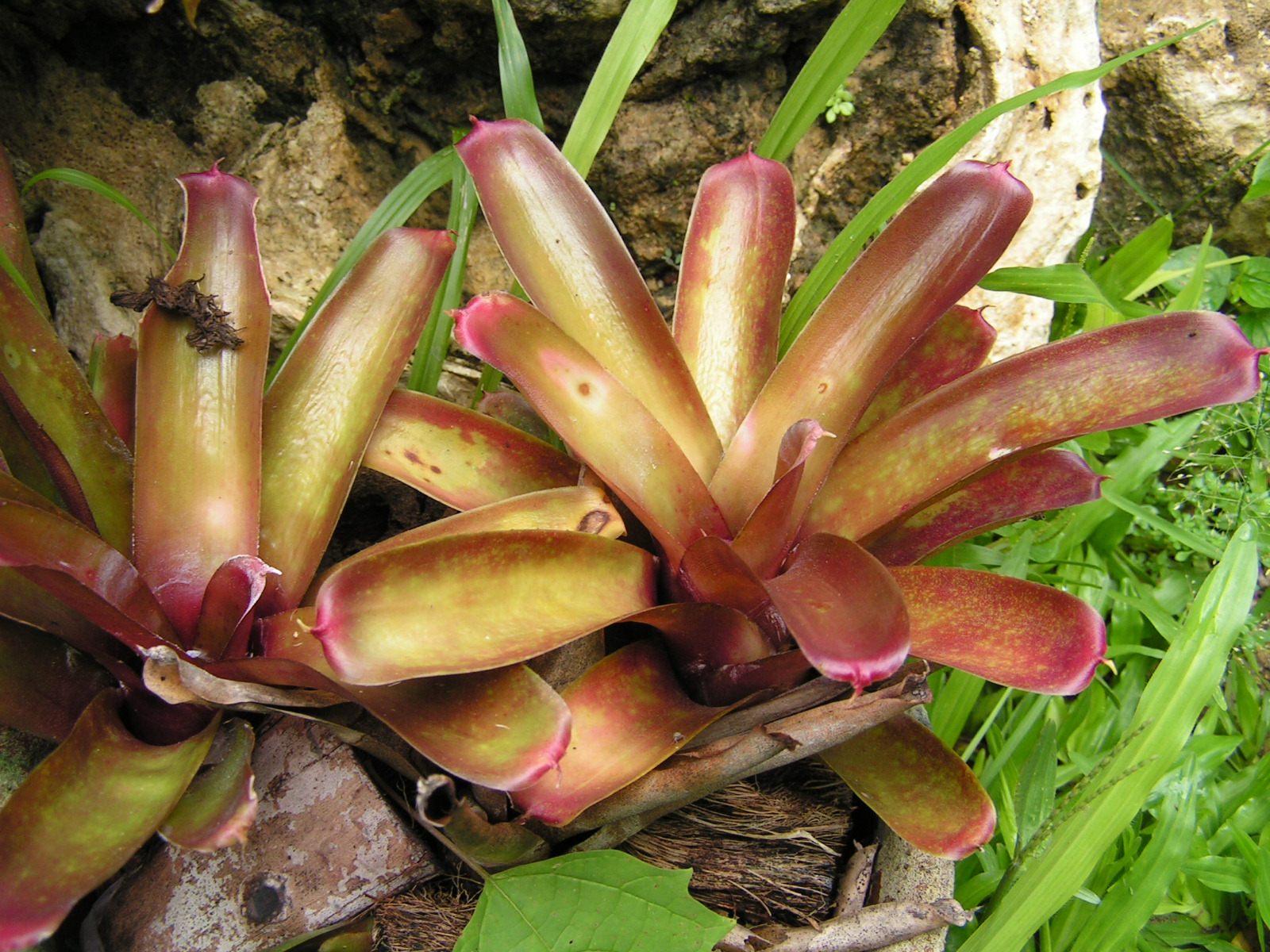
Bromeliad10

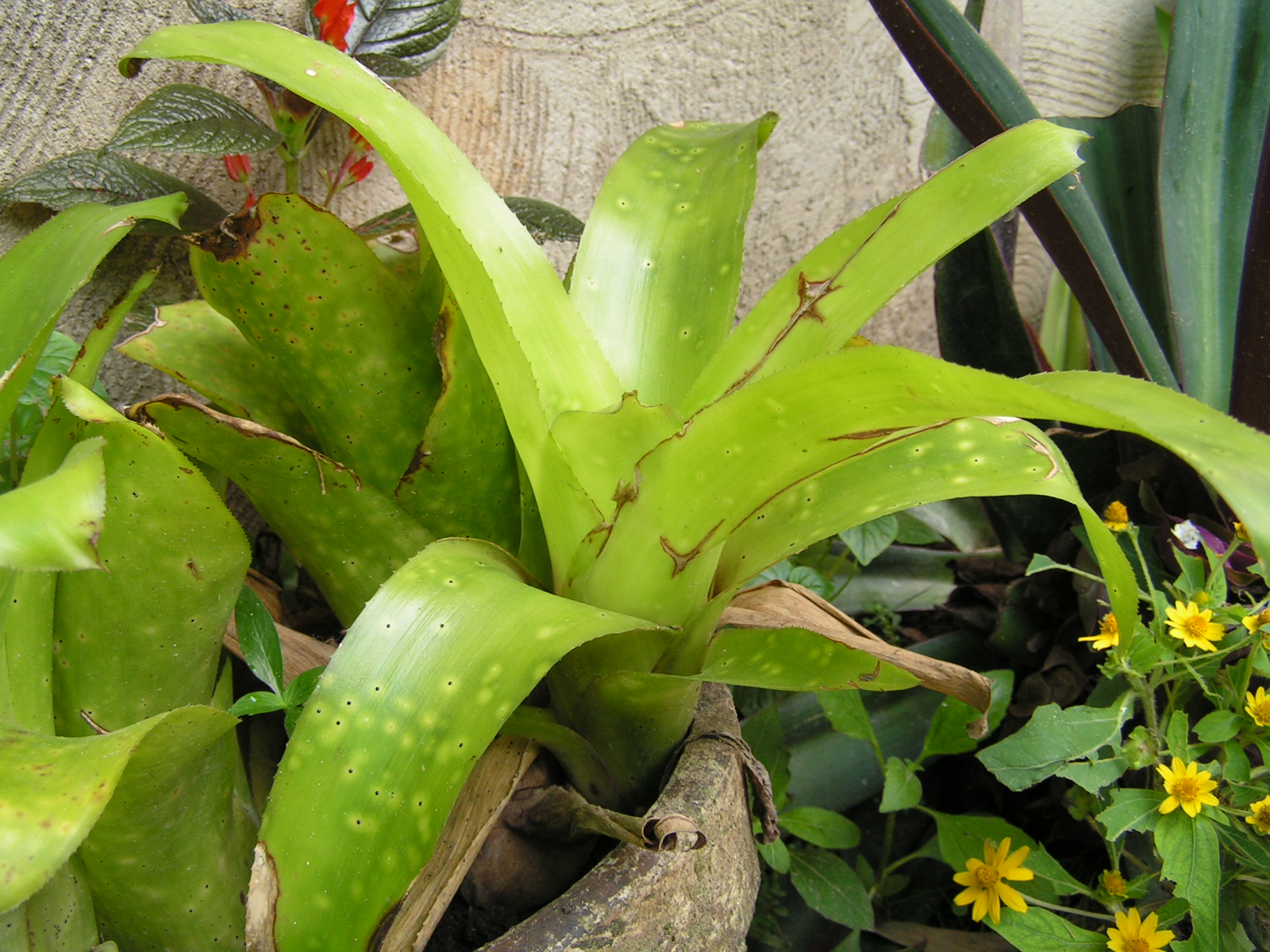
Bromeliad11

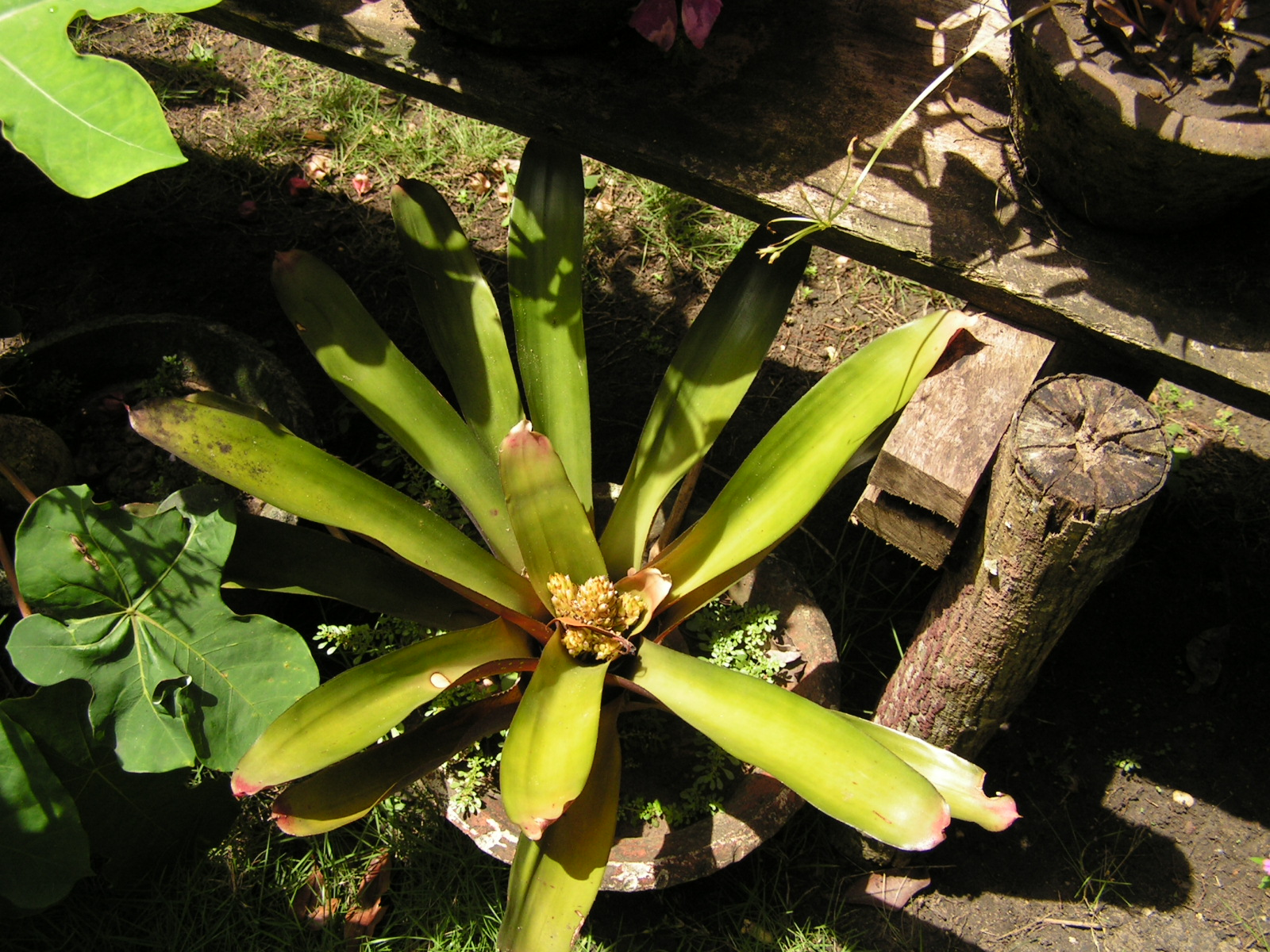
Bromeliad12

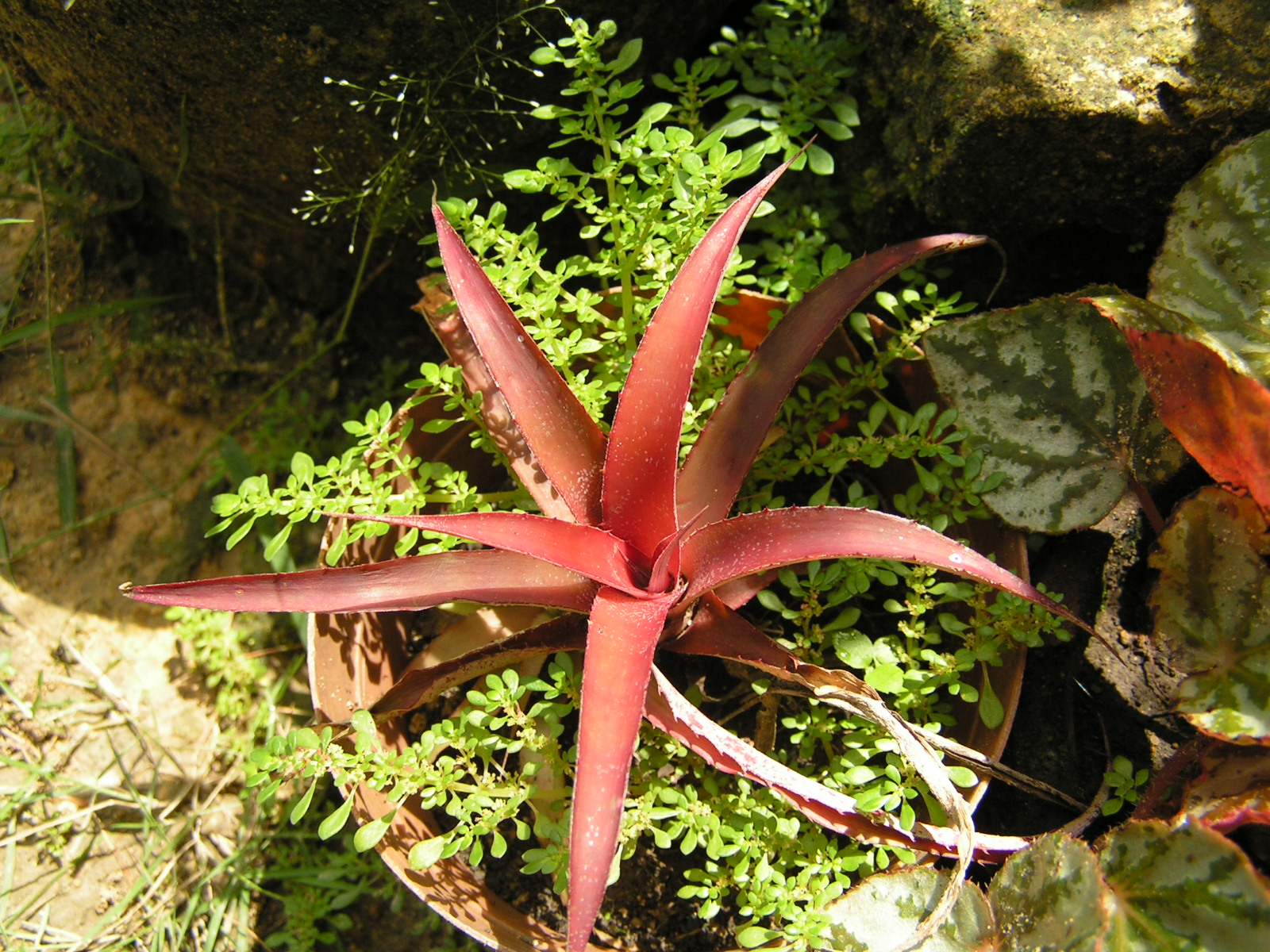
Bromeliad13

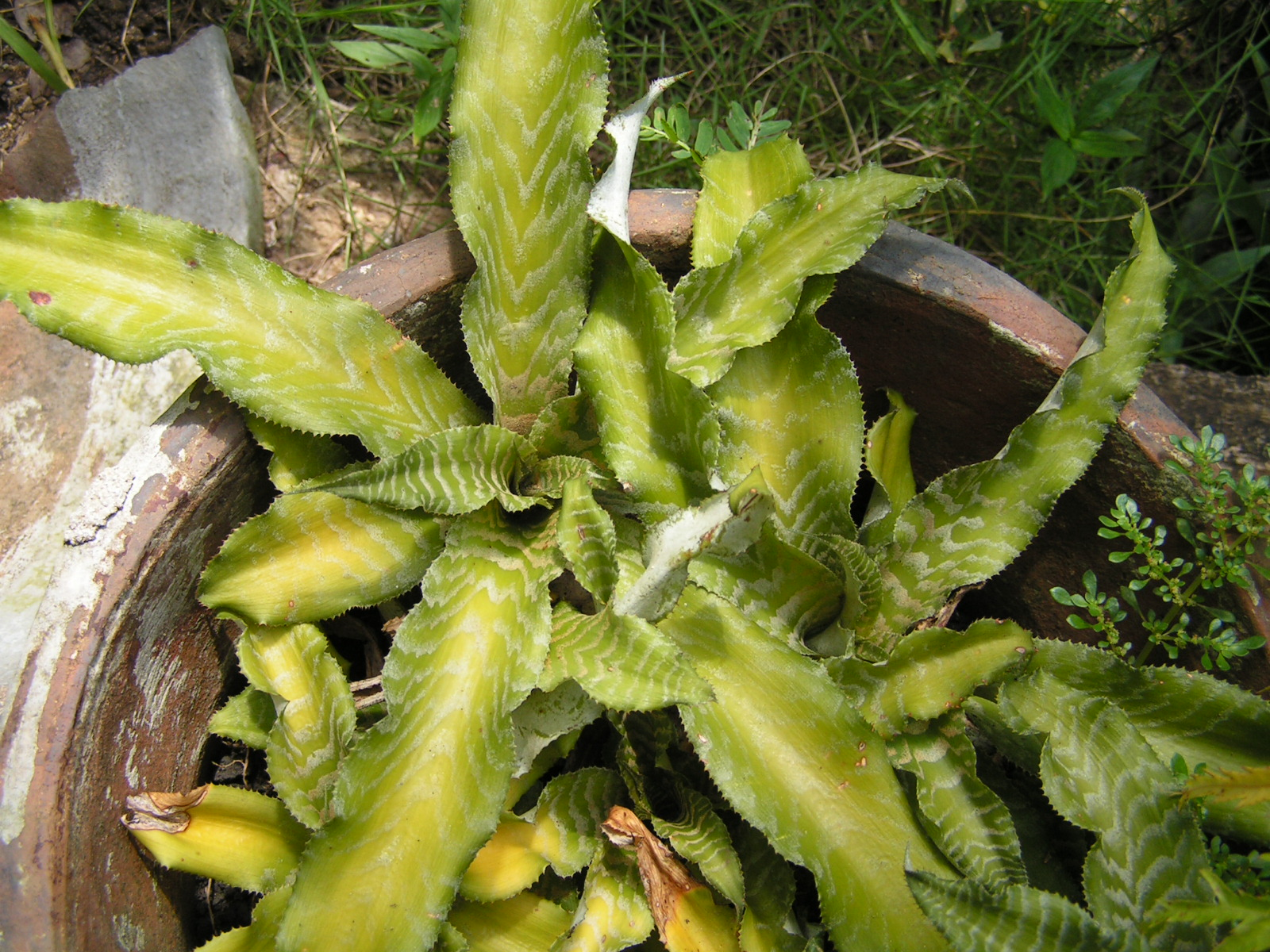
Bromeliad14

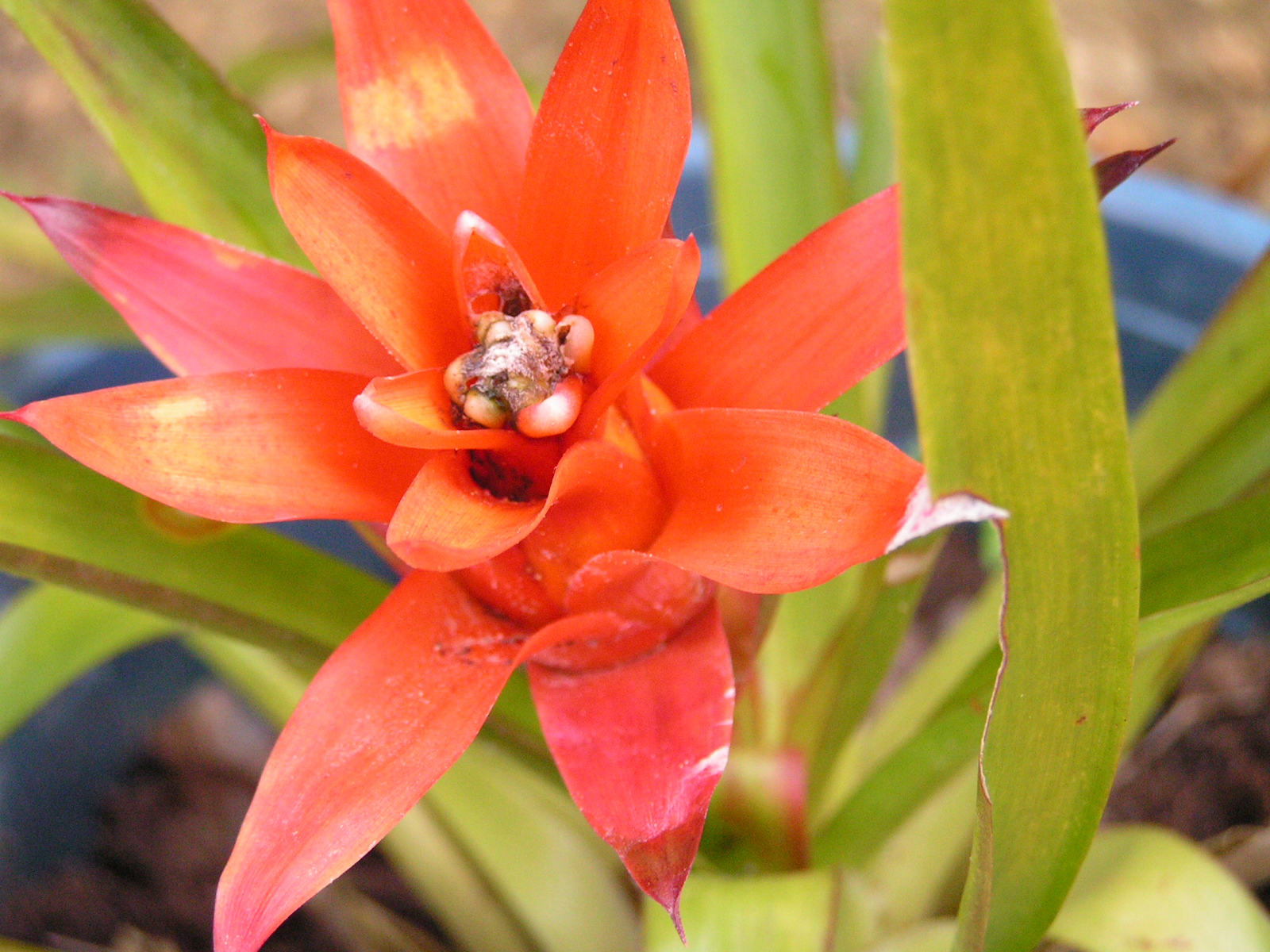
Bromeliad15

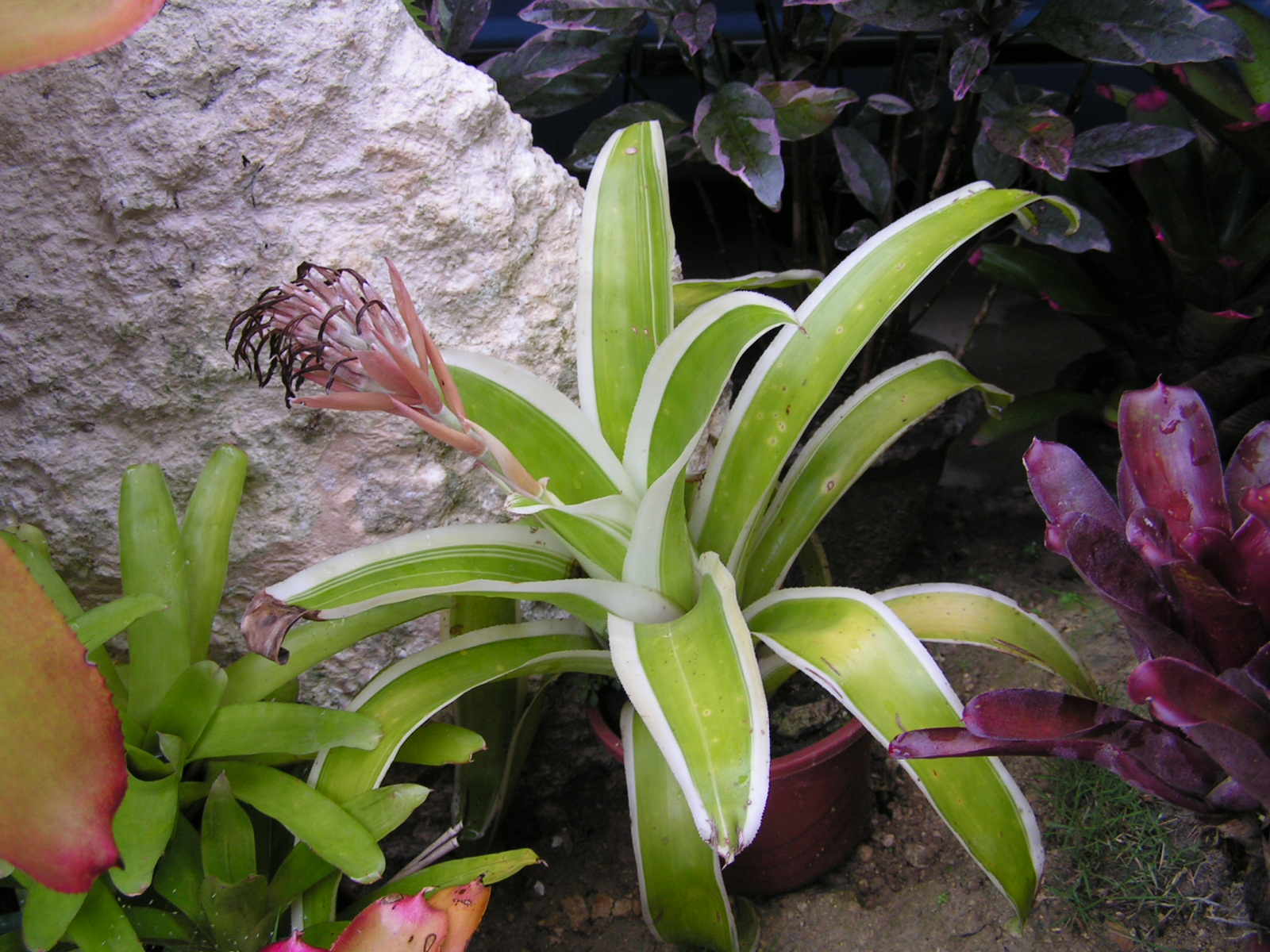
Bromeliad16

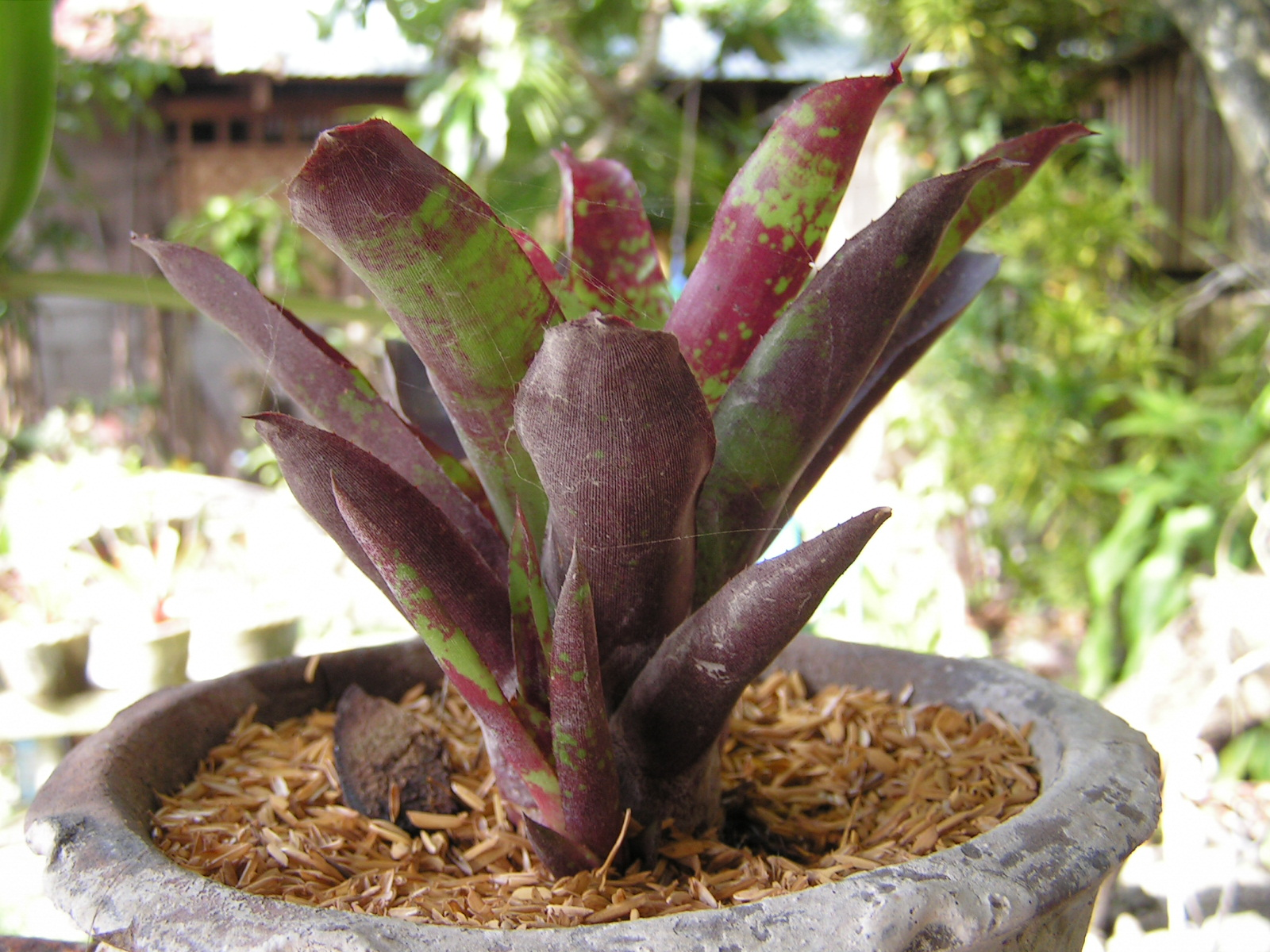
Bromeliad17

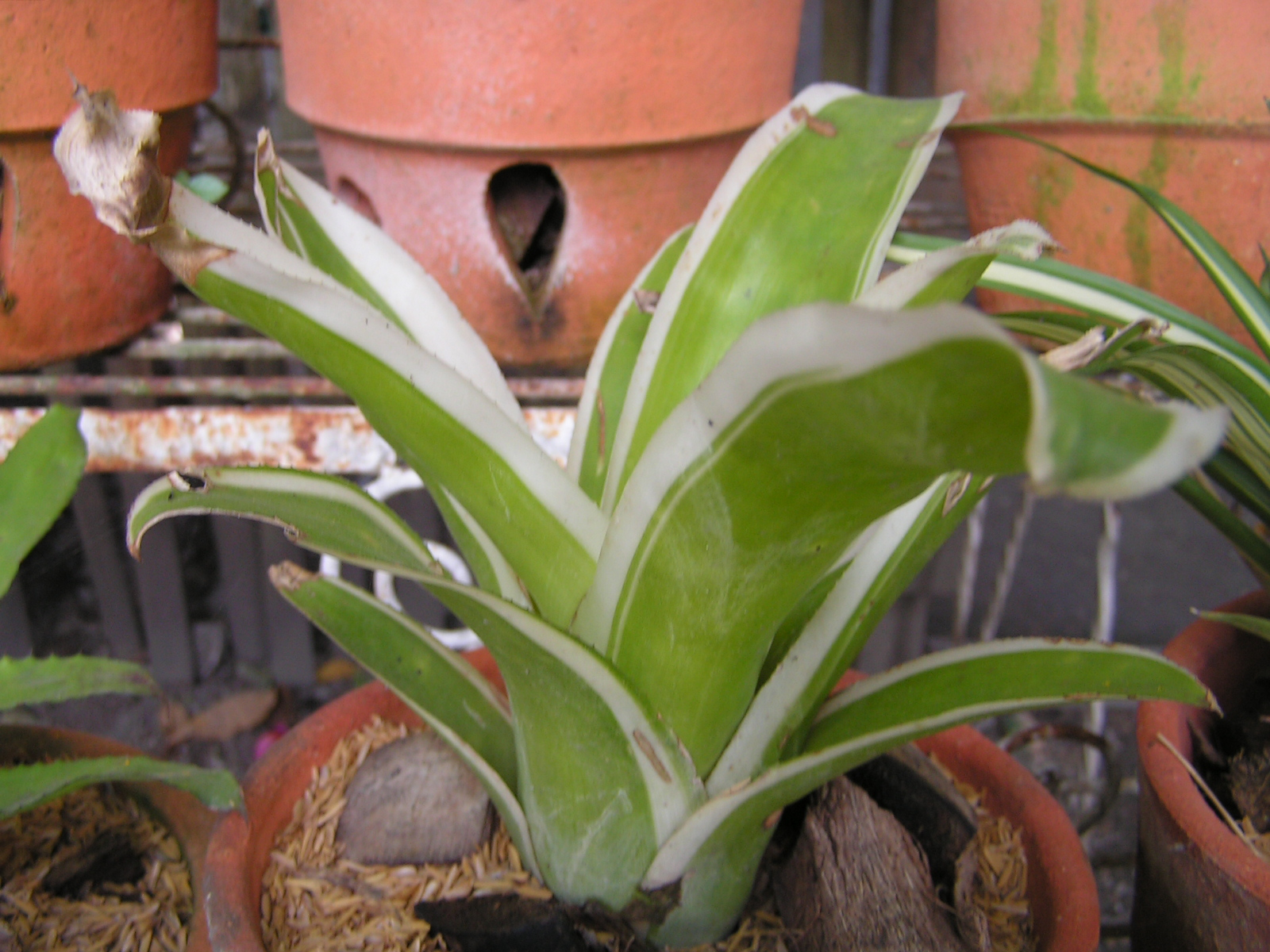
Bromeliad18

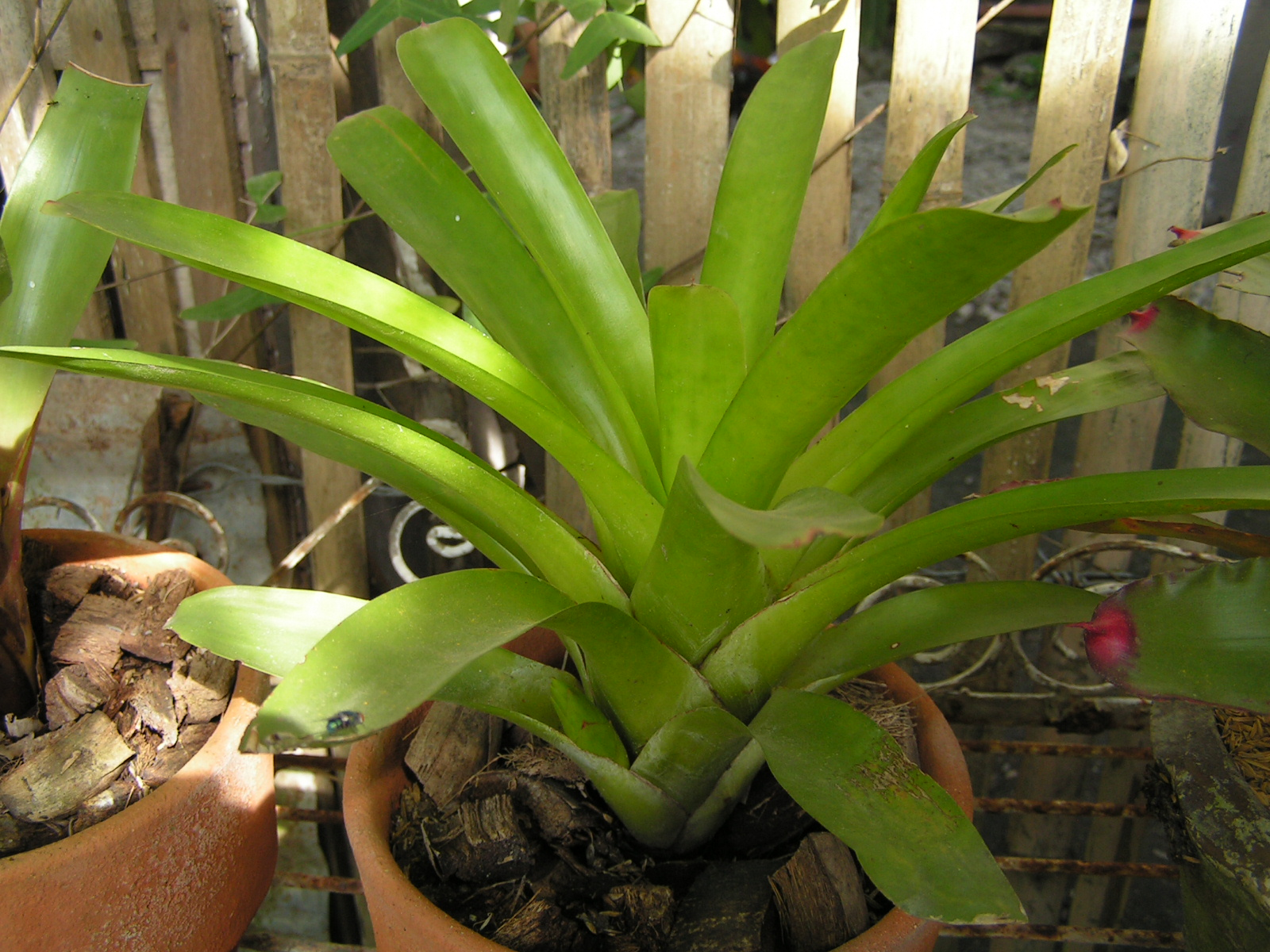
Bromeliad19

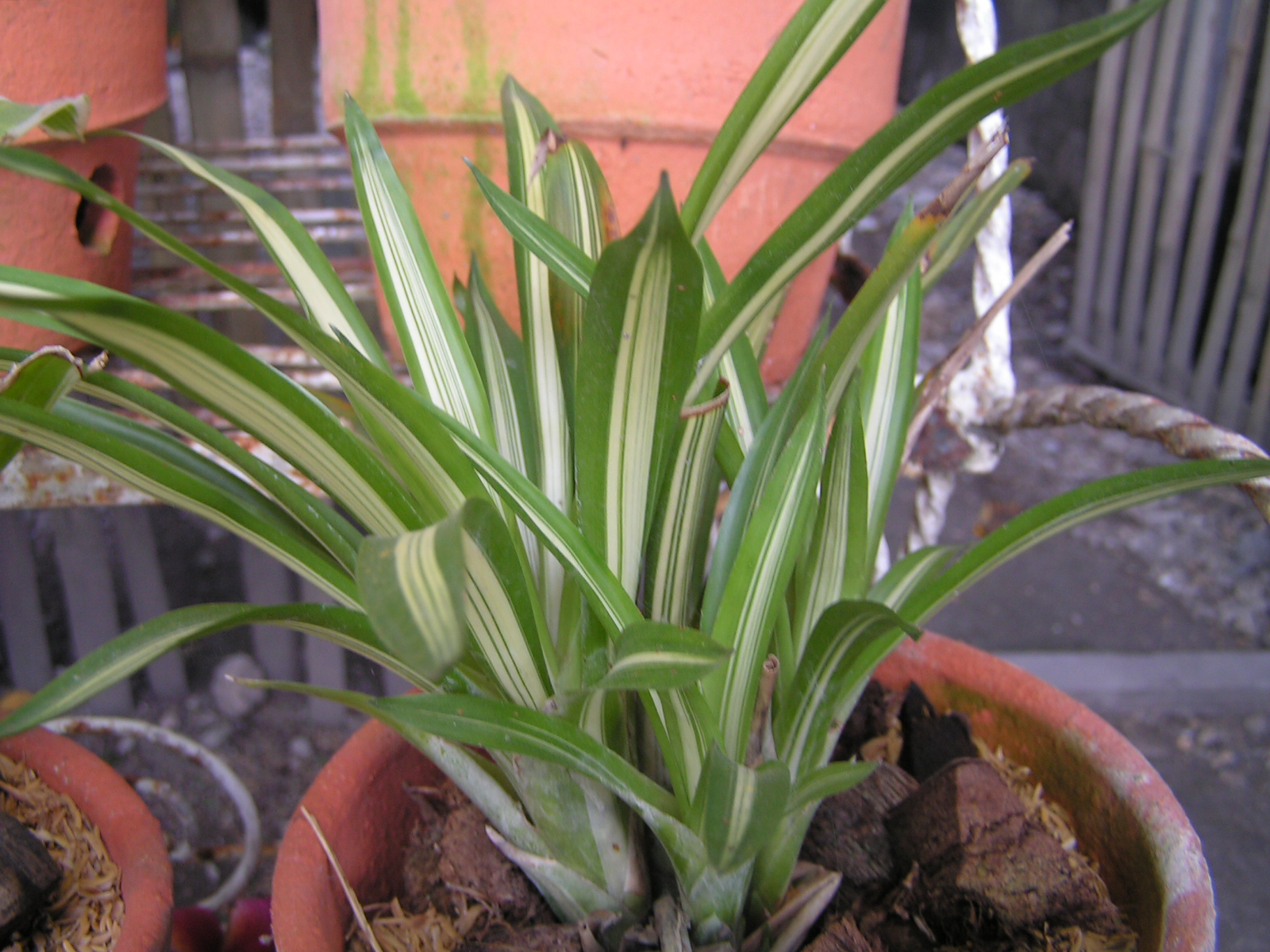
Bromeliad20

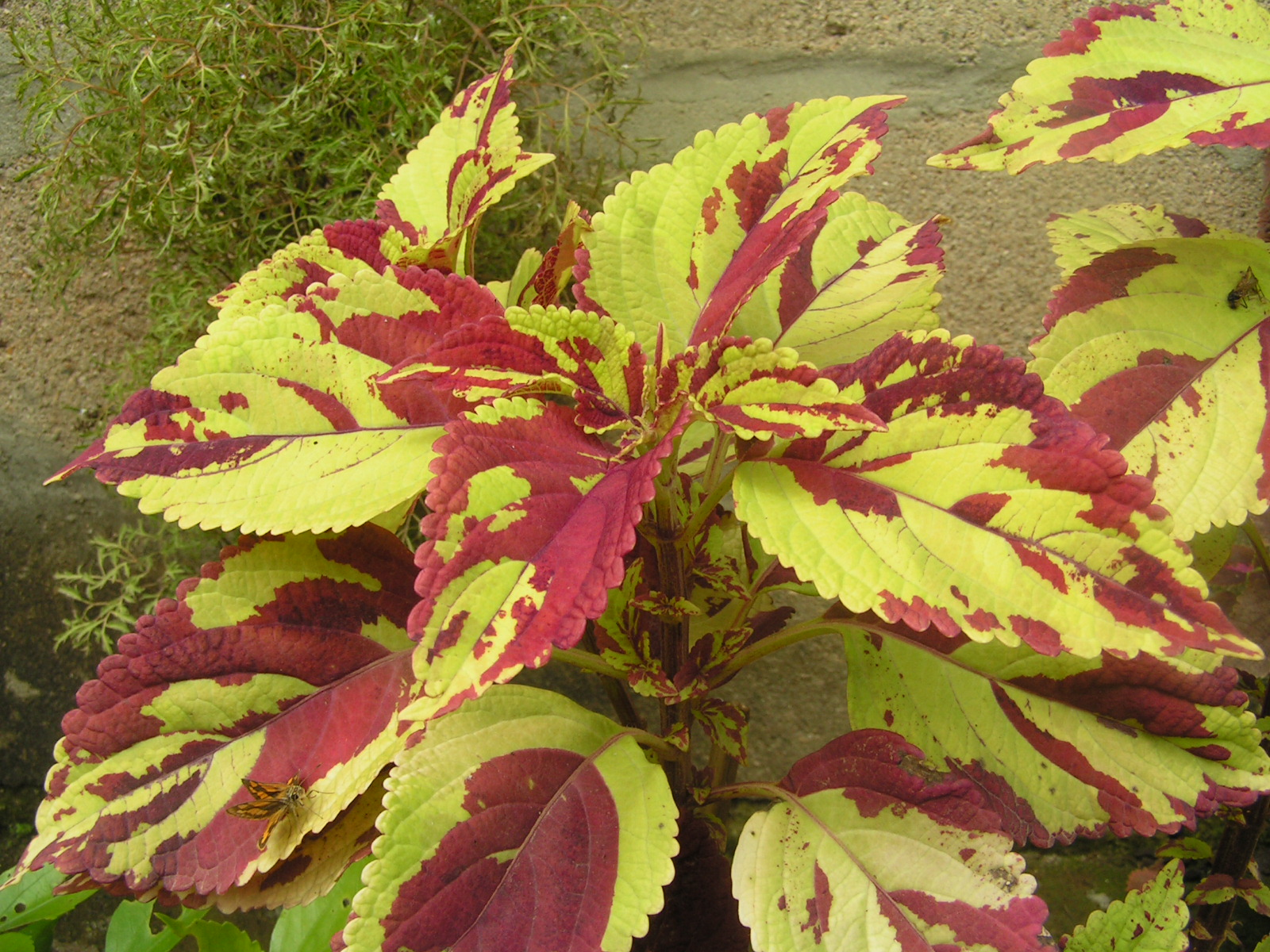
Coleus sp. 1

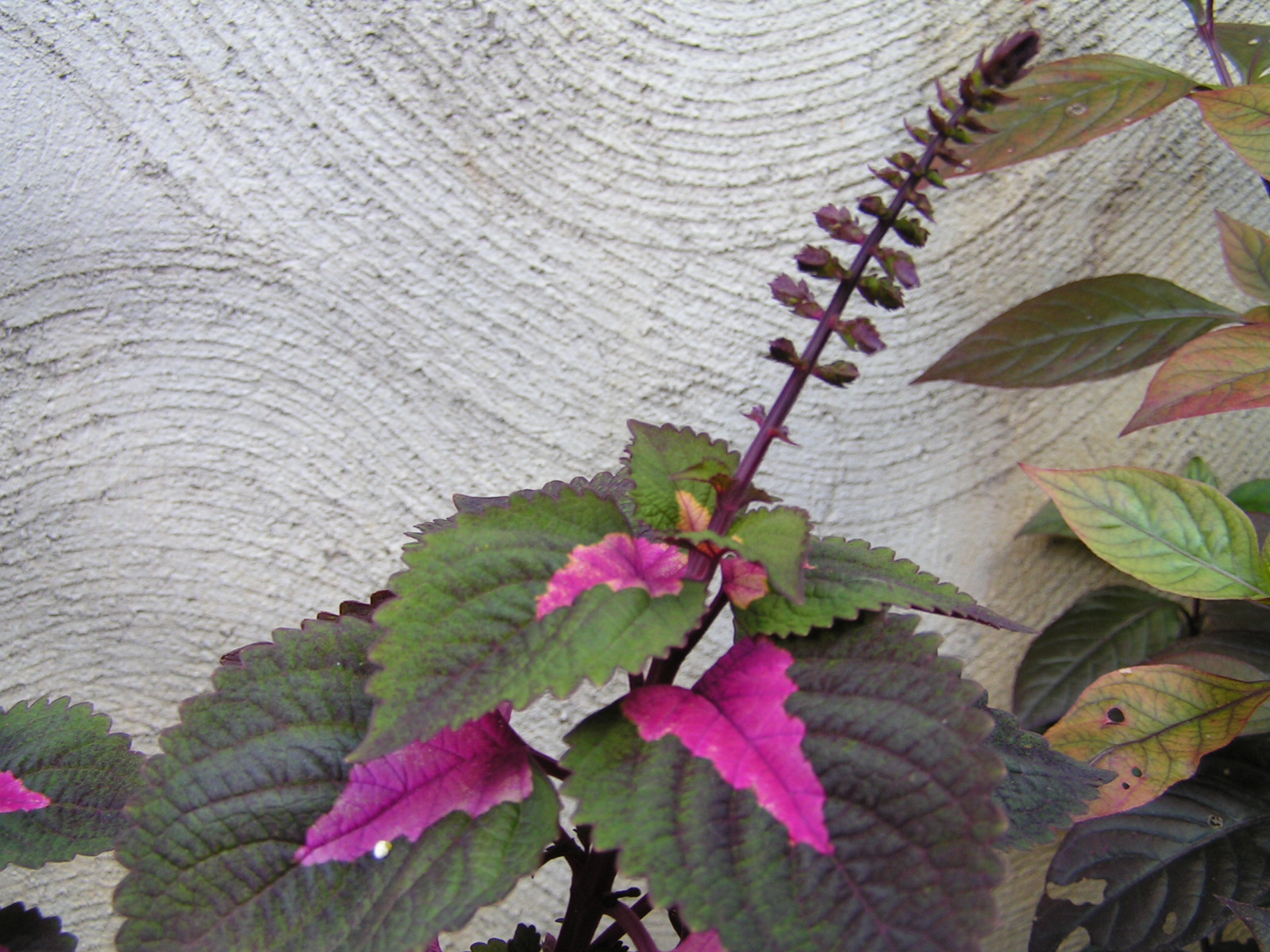
Coleus sp. 2

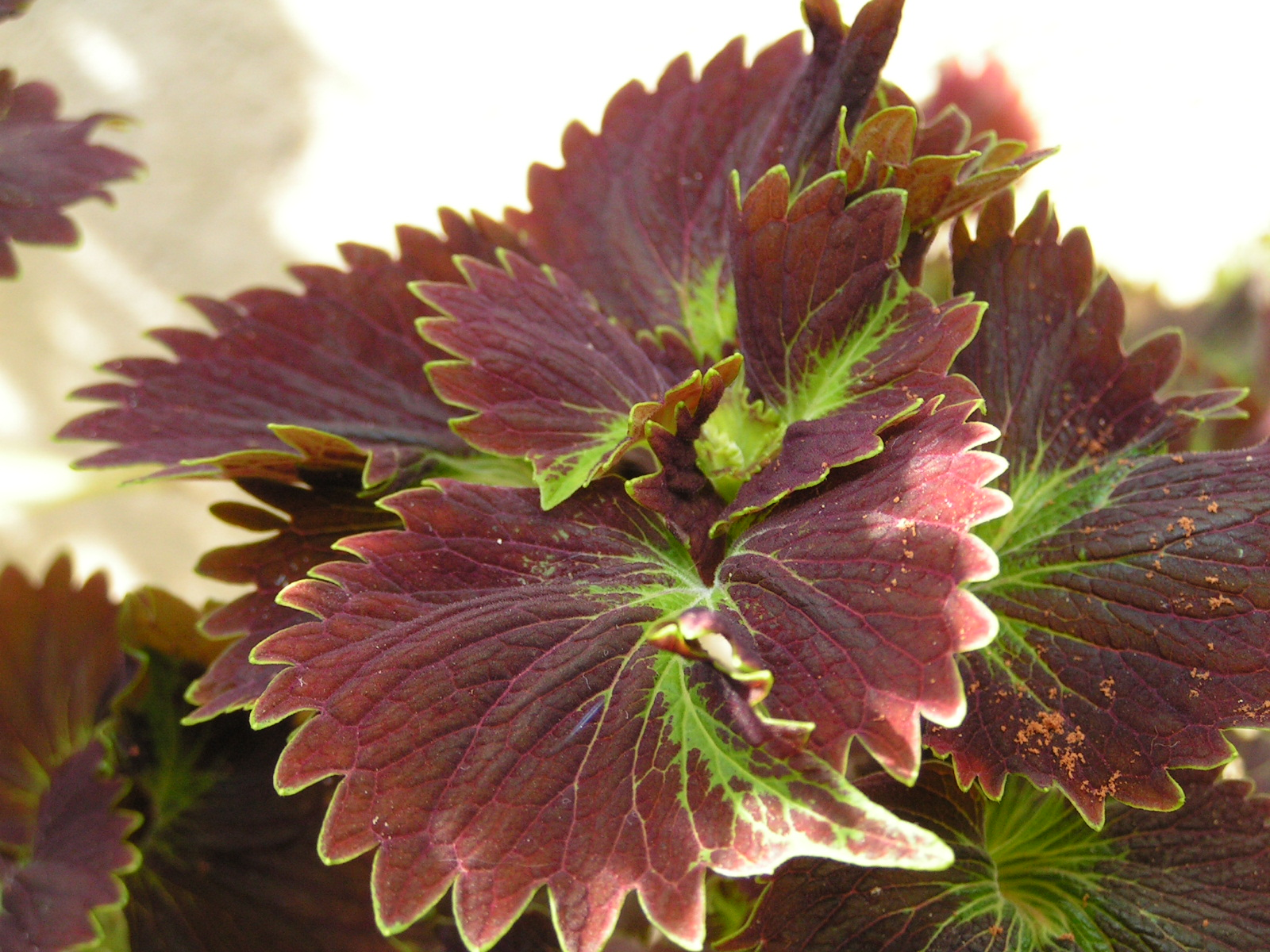
Coleus sp. 3

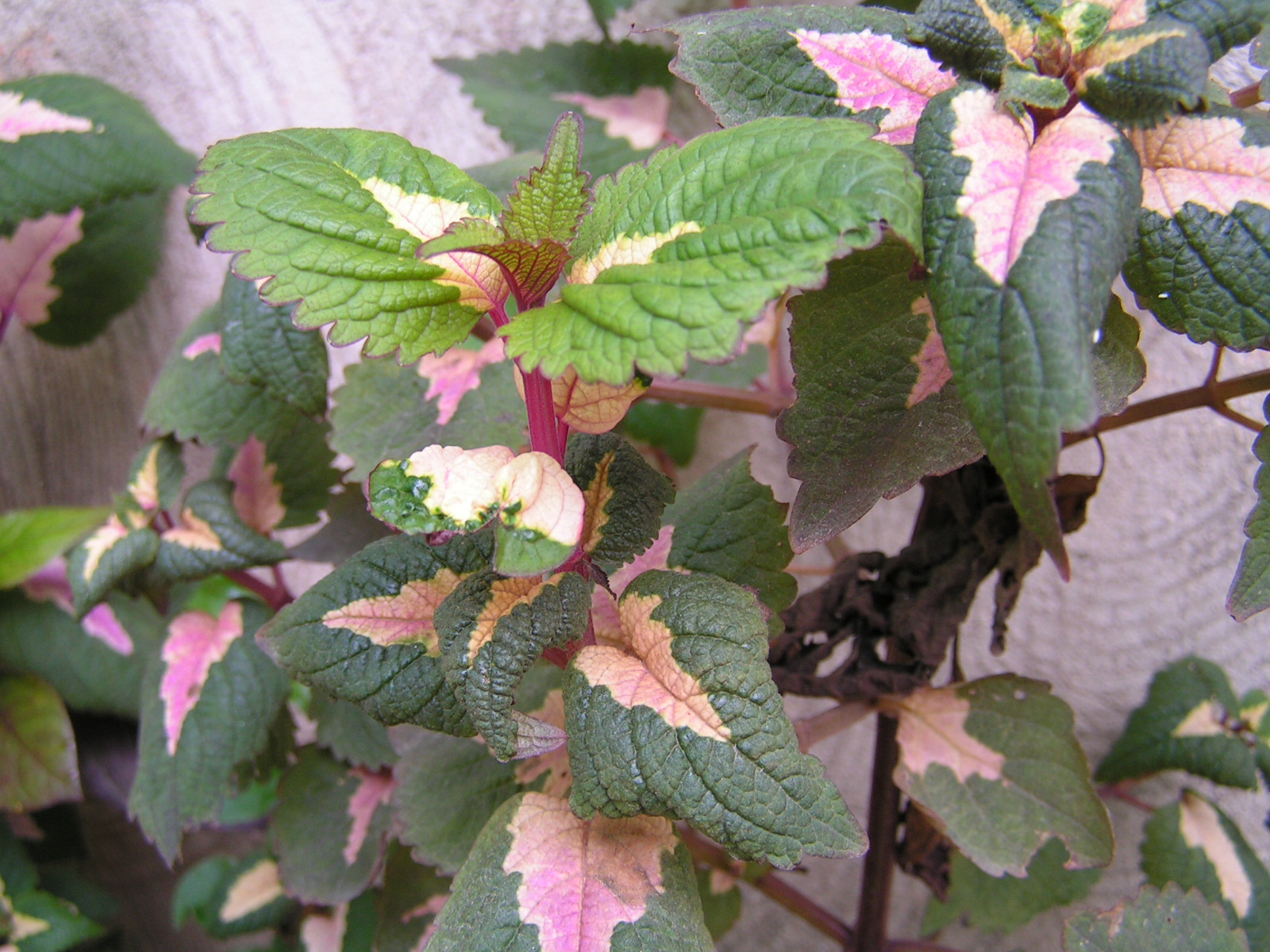
Coleus sp. 4

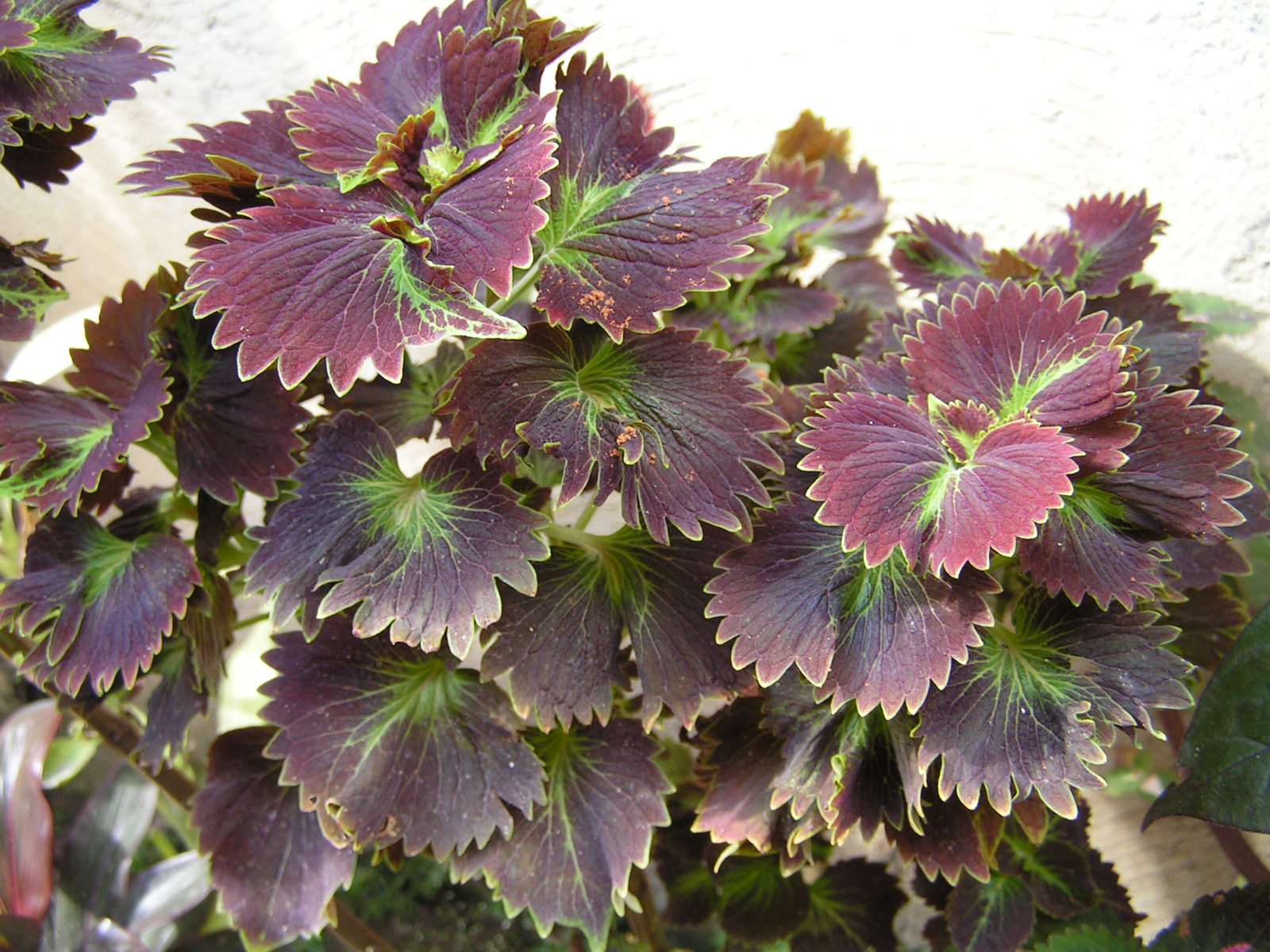
Coleus sp. 5

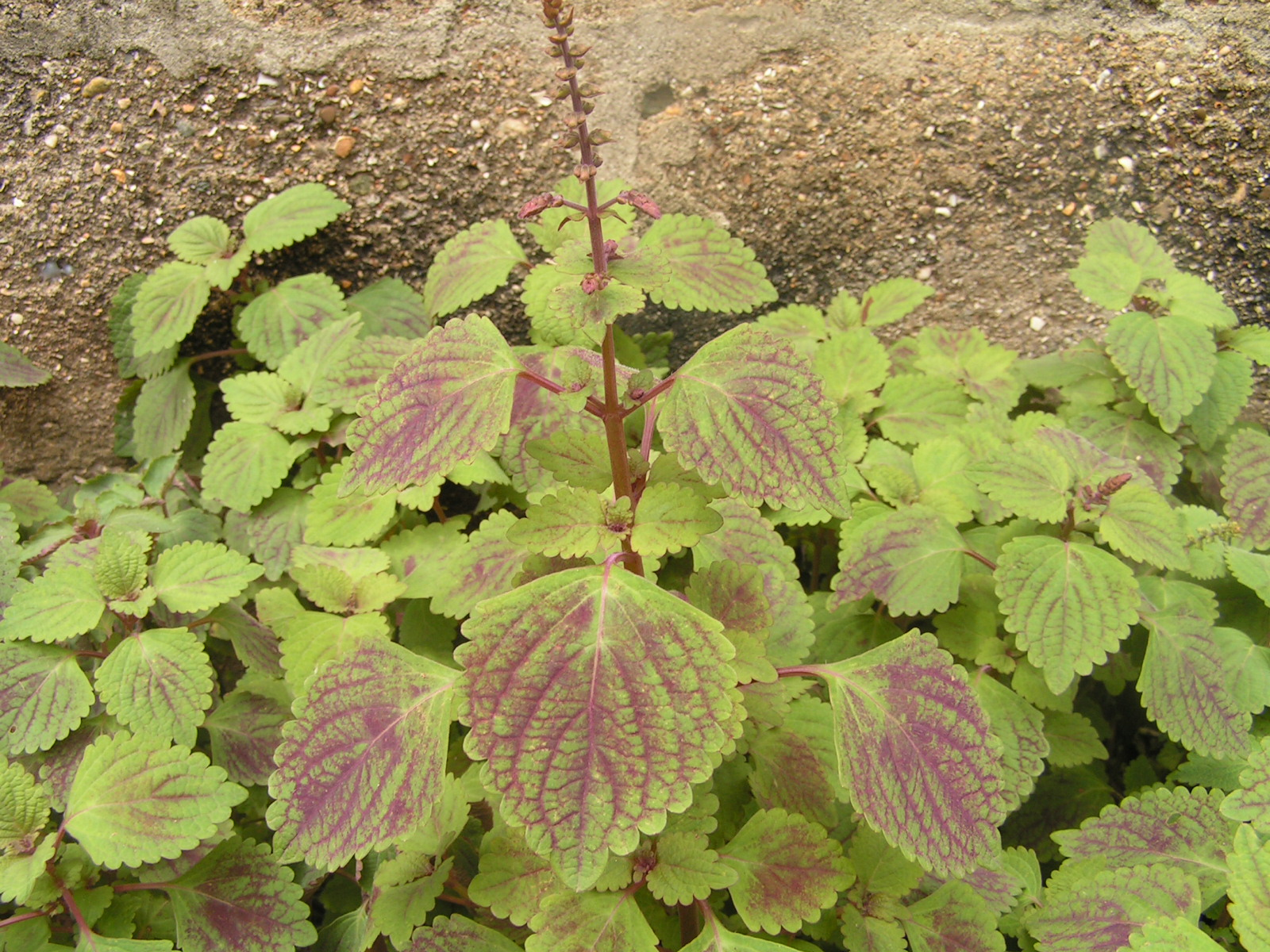
Coleus sp. 6

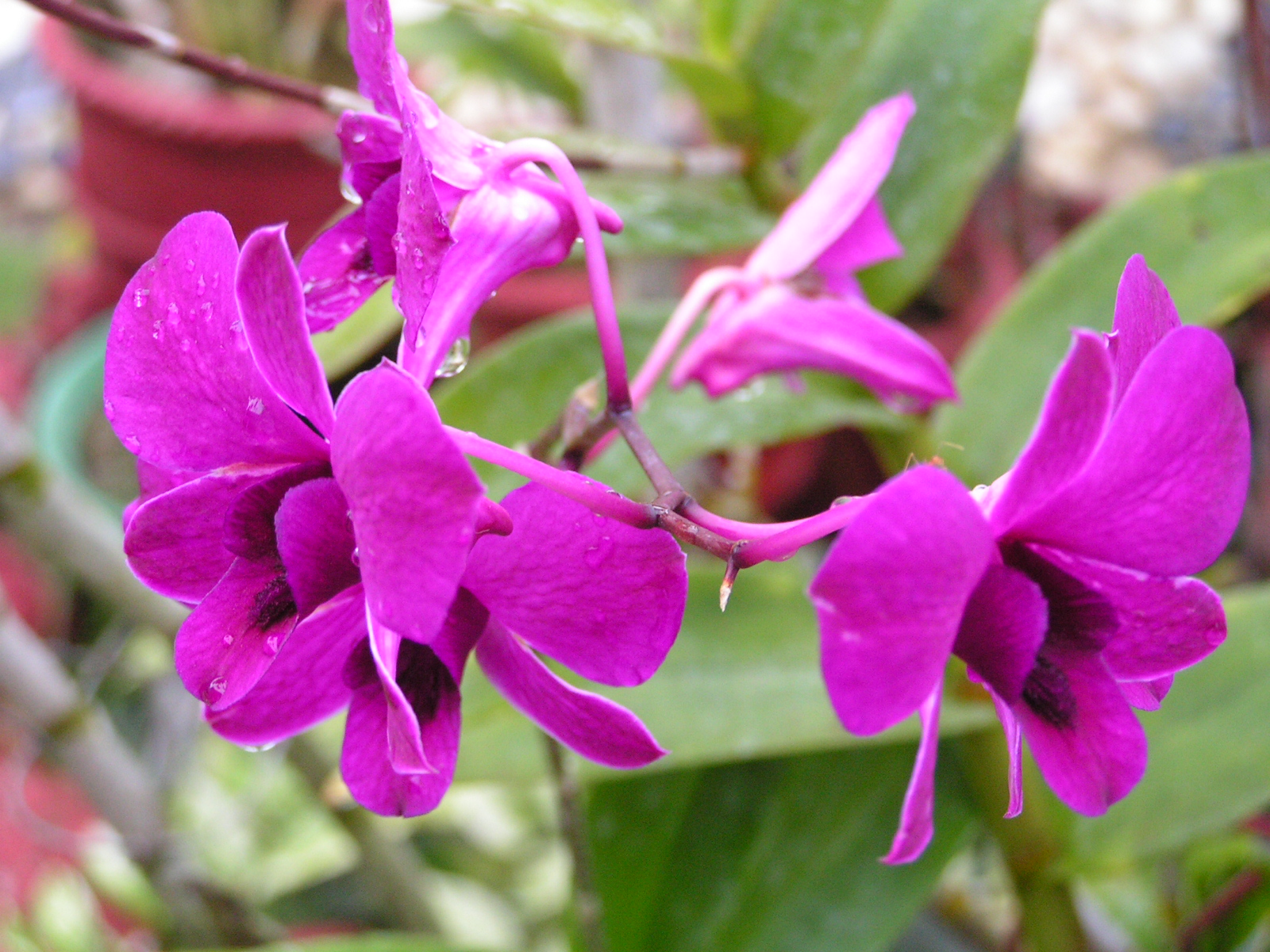
Dendrobium

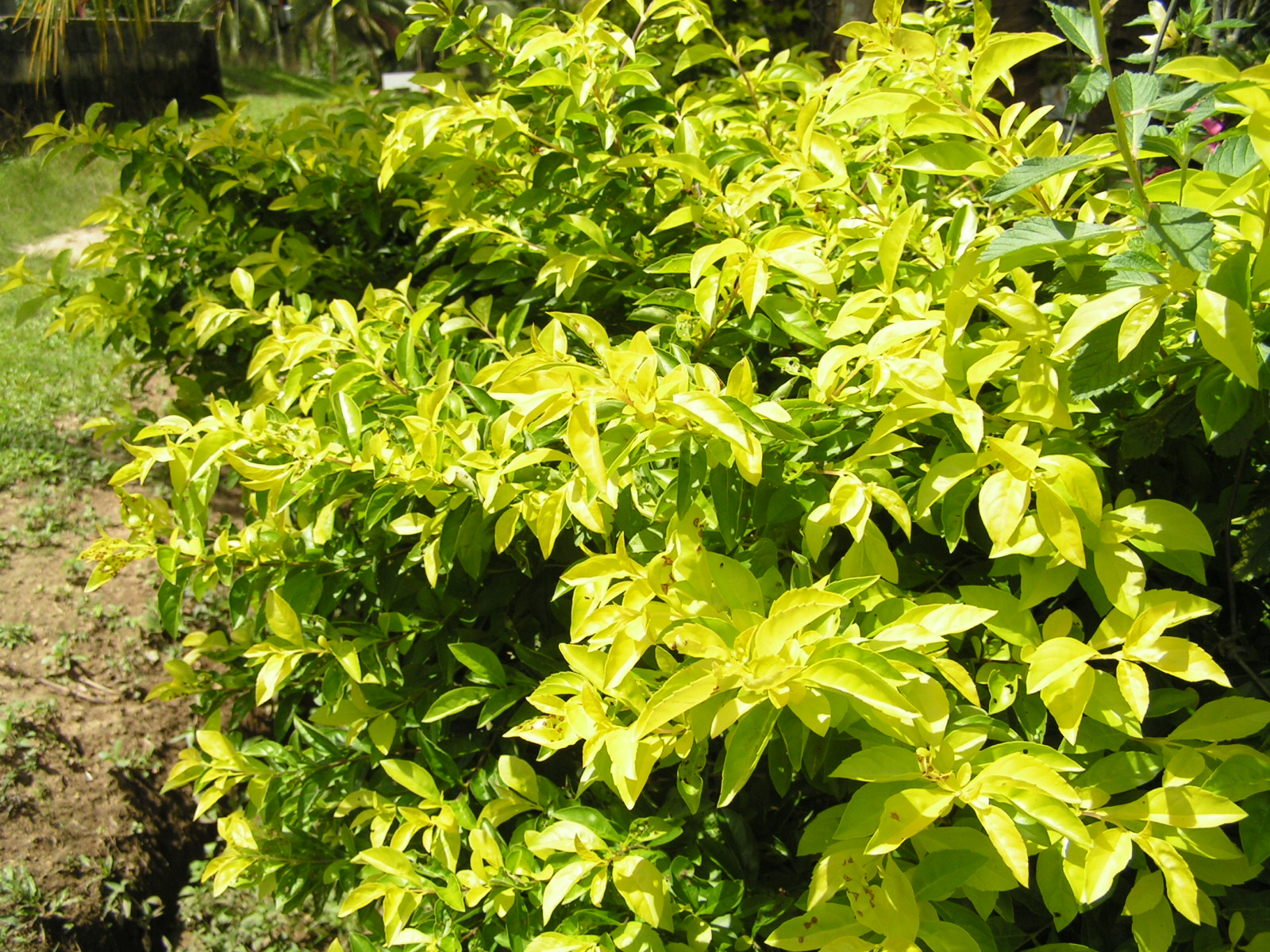
Golden Duranta

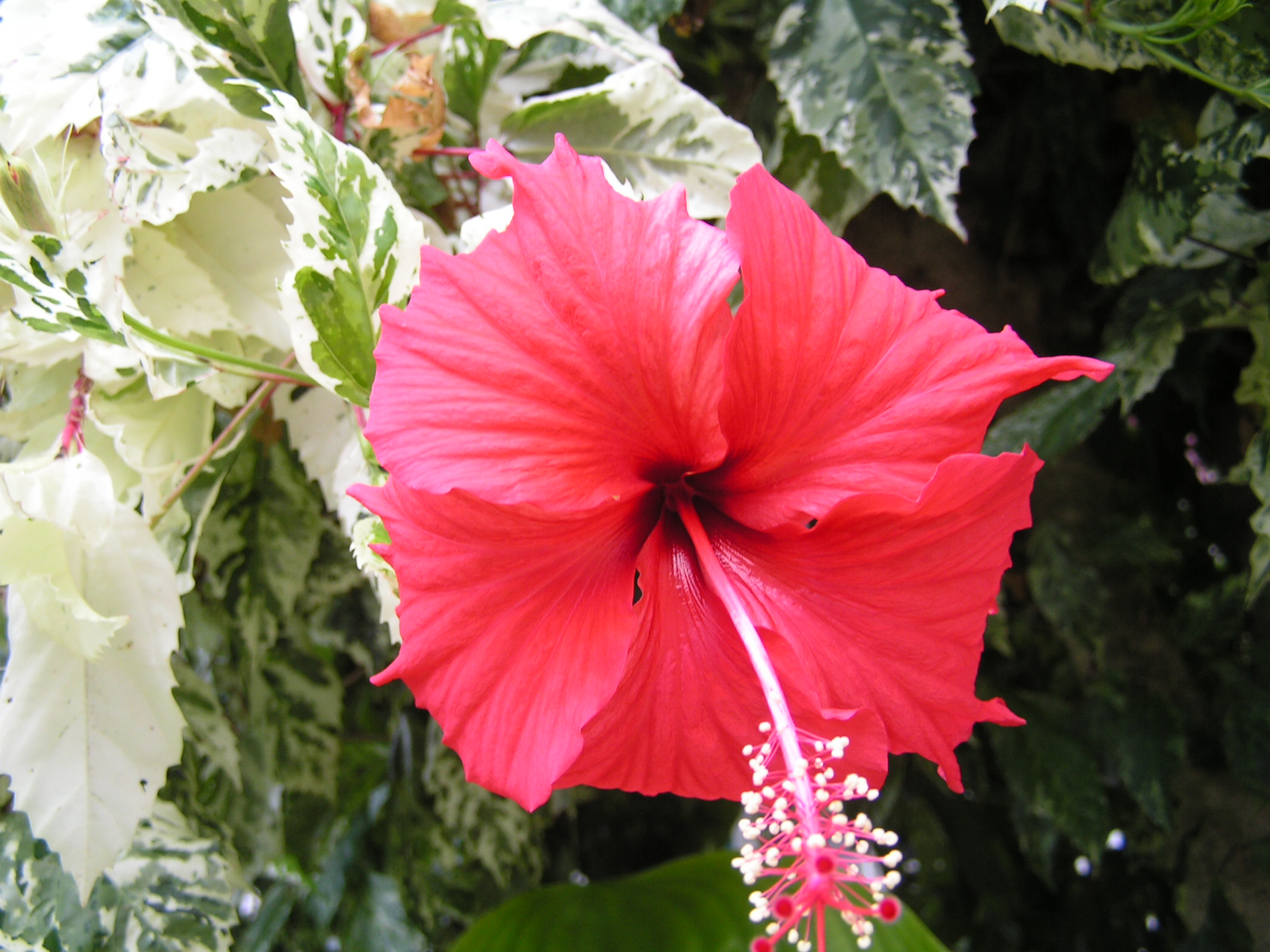
Hibiscus rosa sinensis (Gumamela in Visayan)

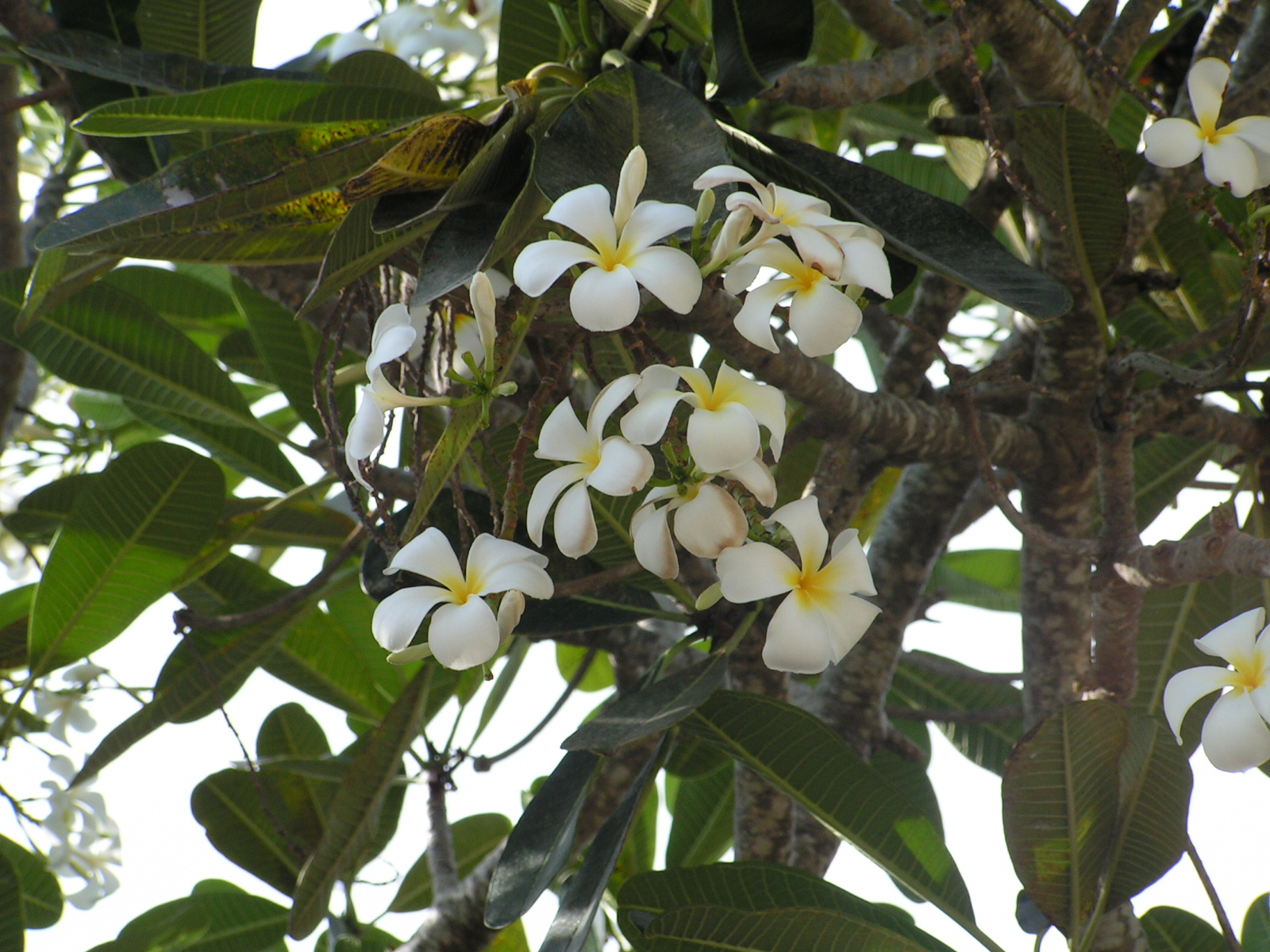
white frangipani (Plumeria or kalachuchi in Visayan)

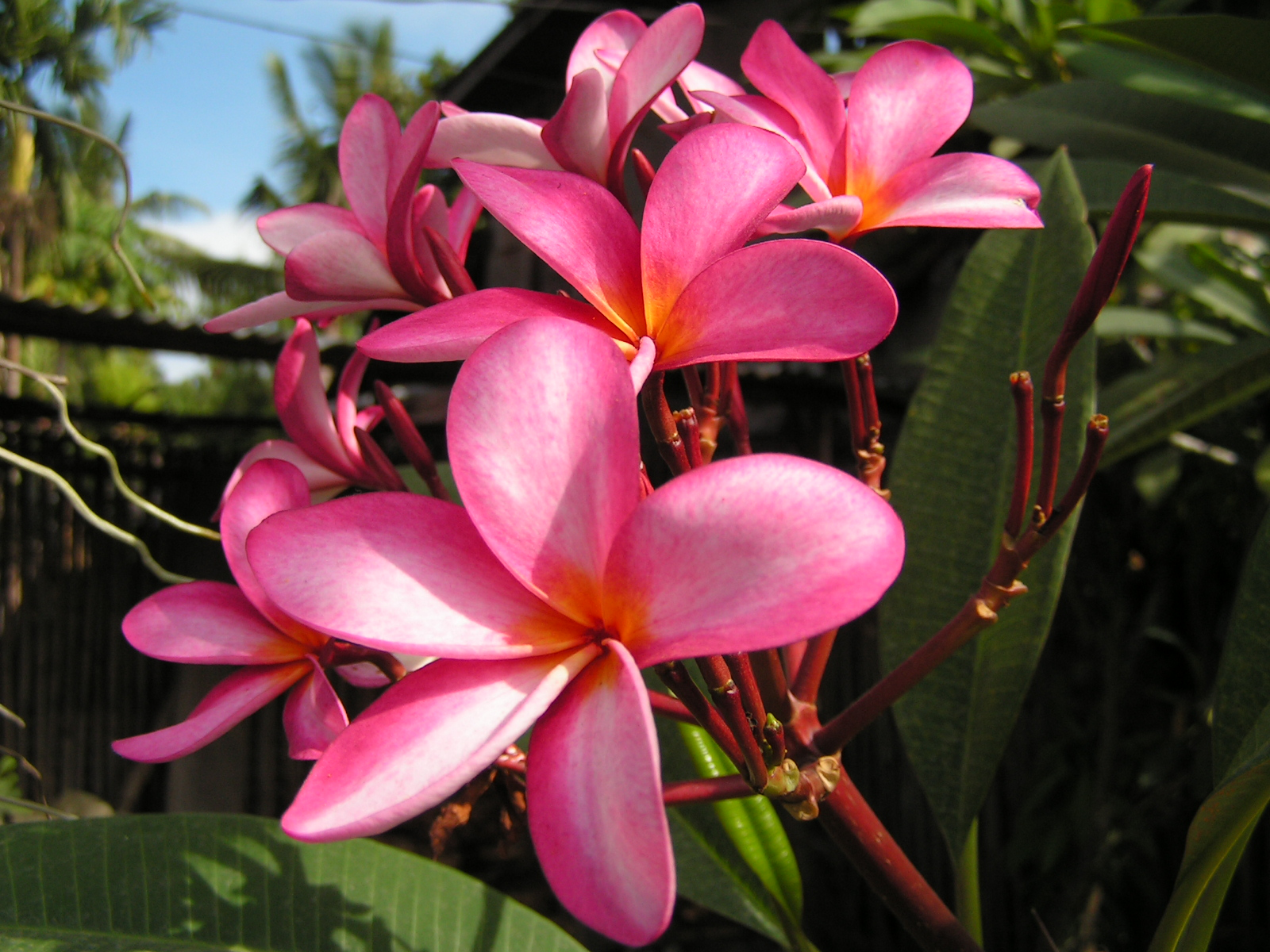
pink frangipani (Plumeria or kalachuchi in Visayan)

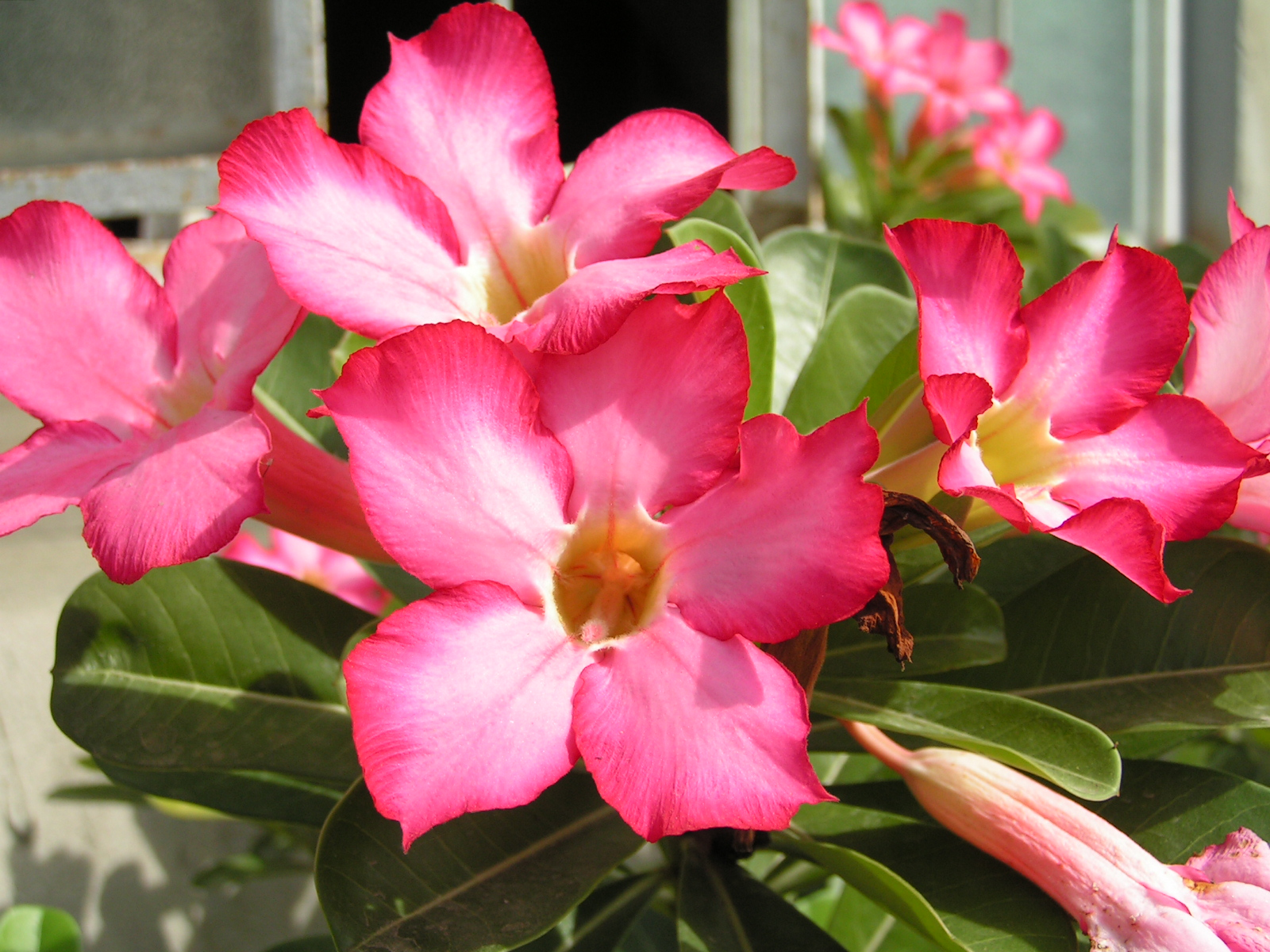
Bangkok kalachuchi

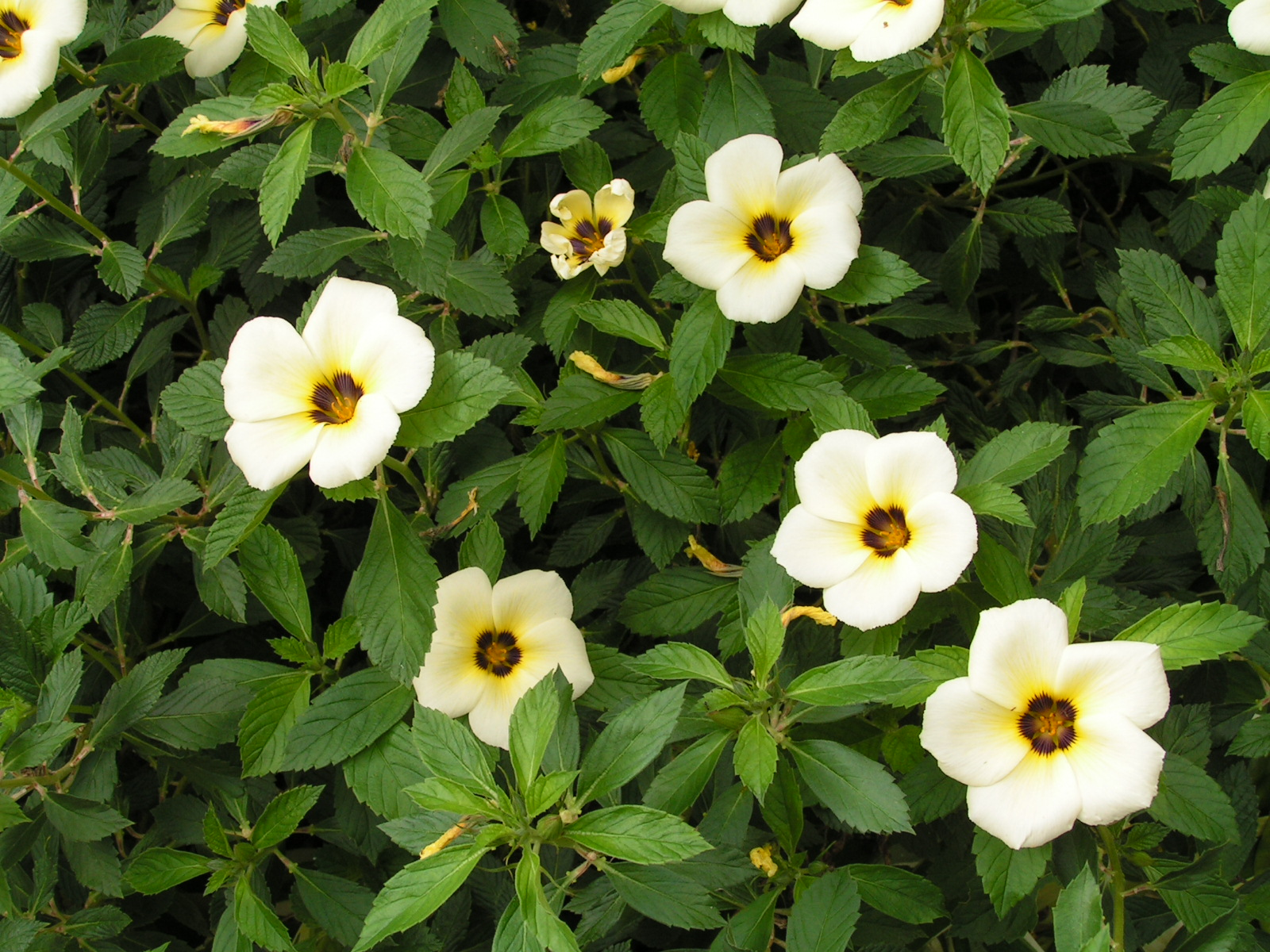
Morning Glory

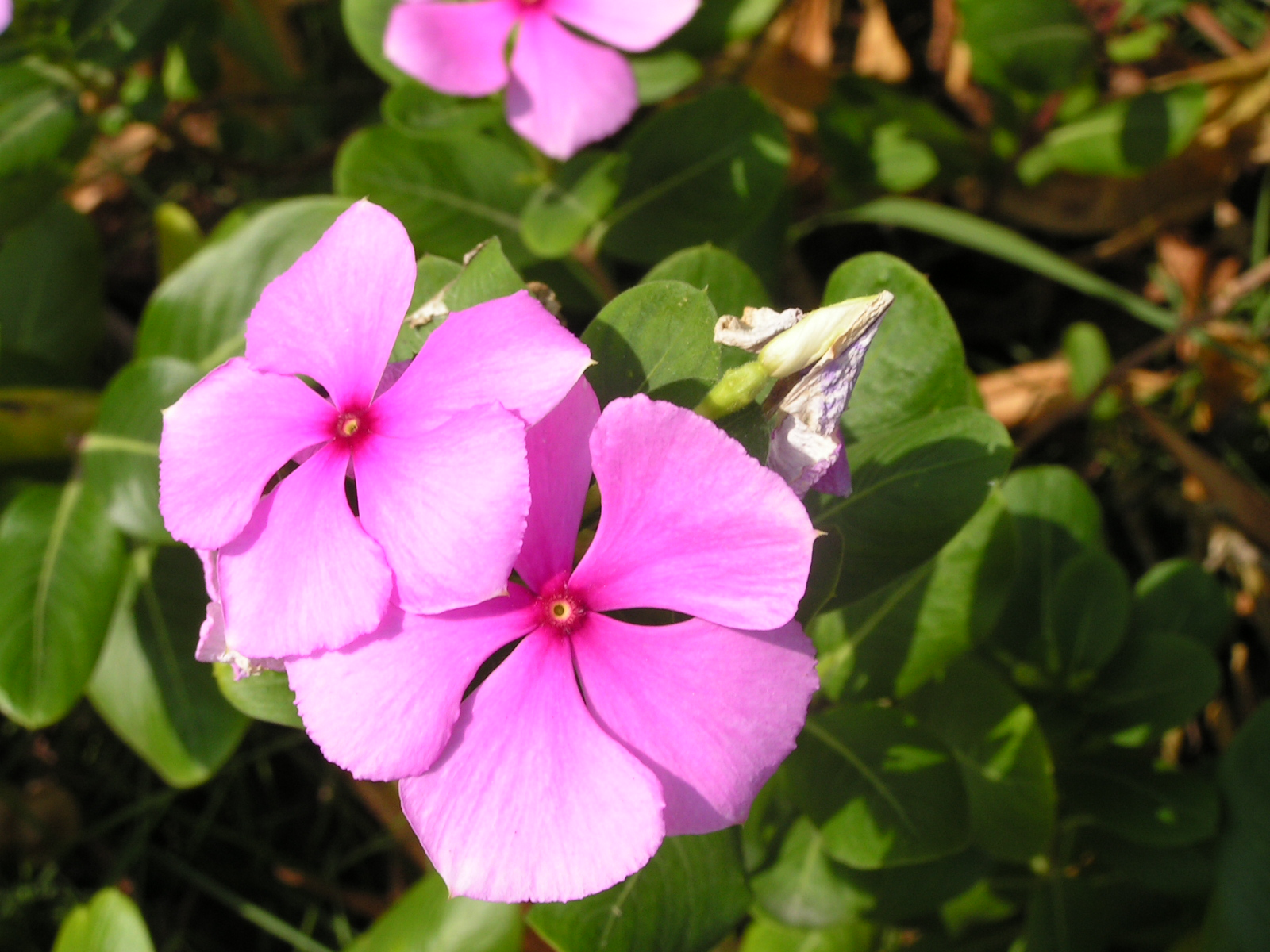
Rosy periwinkle (Catharanthus roseus; kumintang in Visayan)

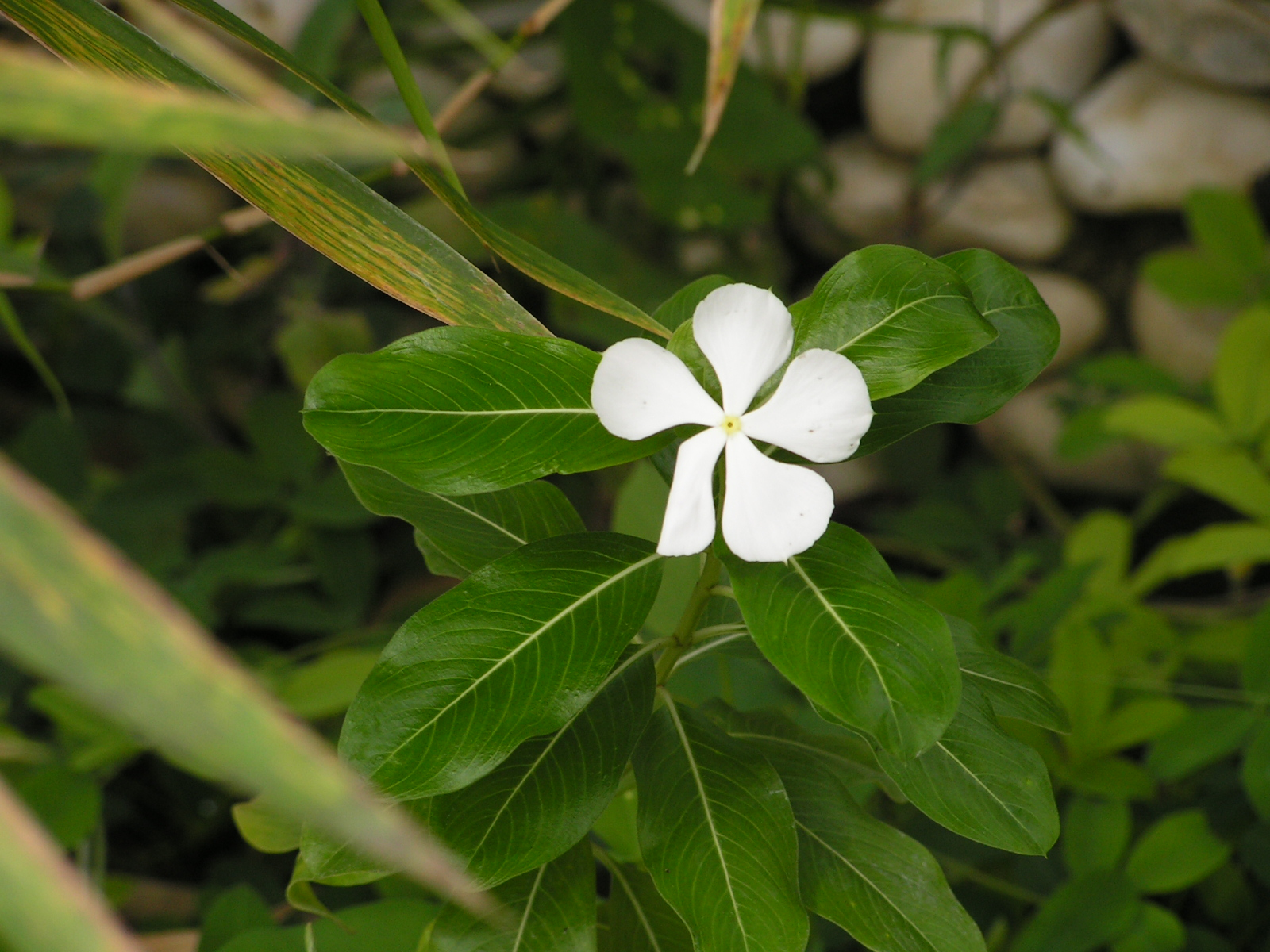
white periwinkle

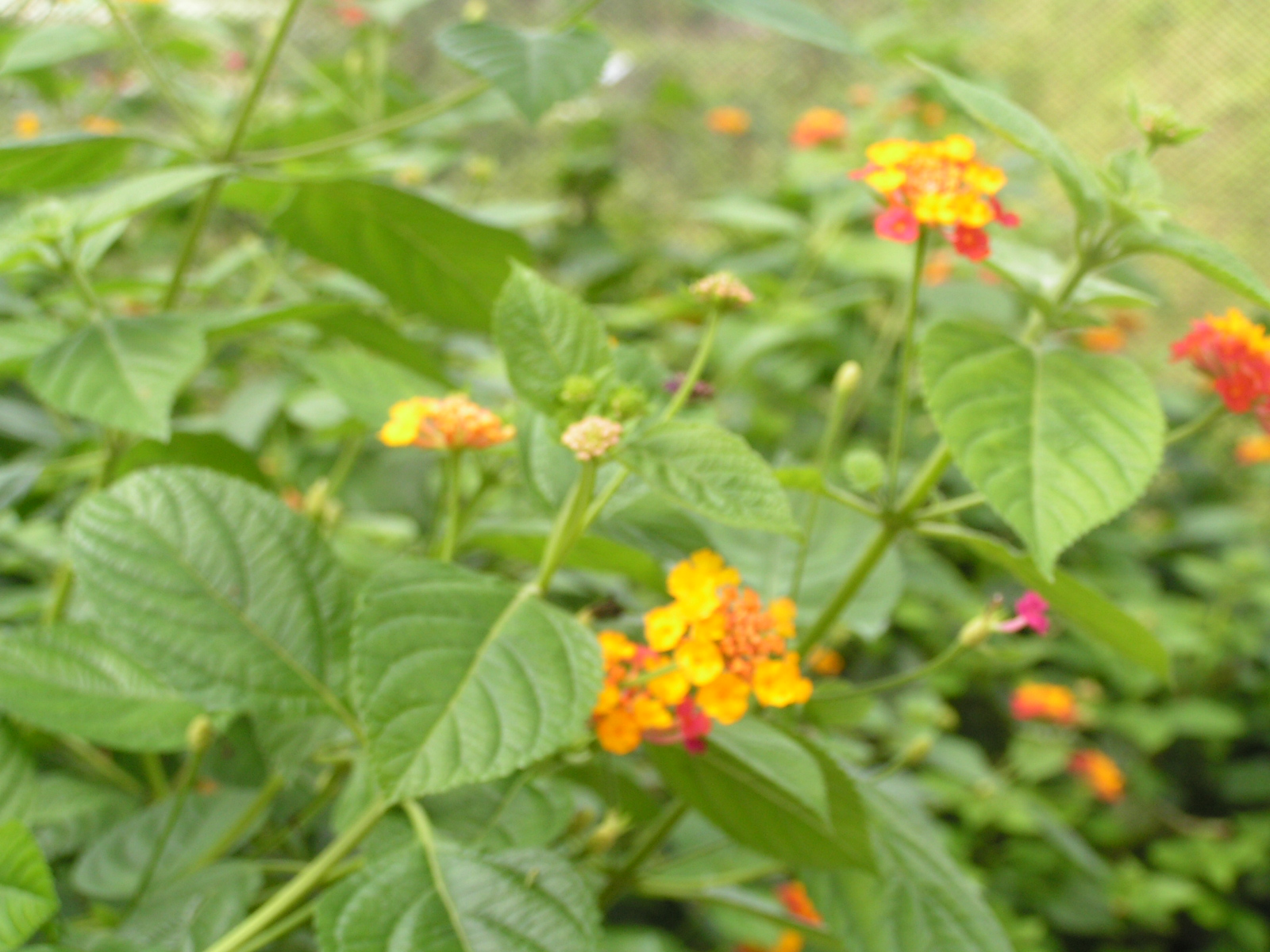
Lantana camara

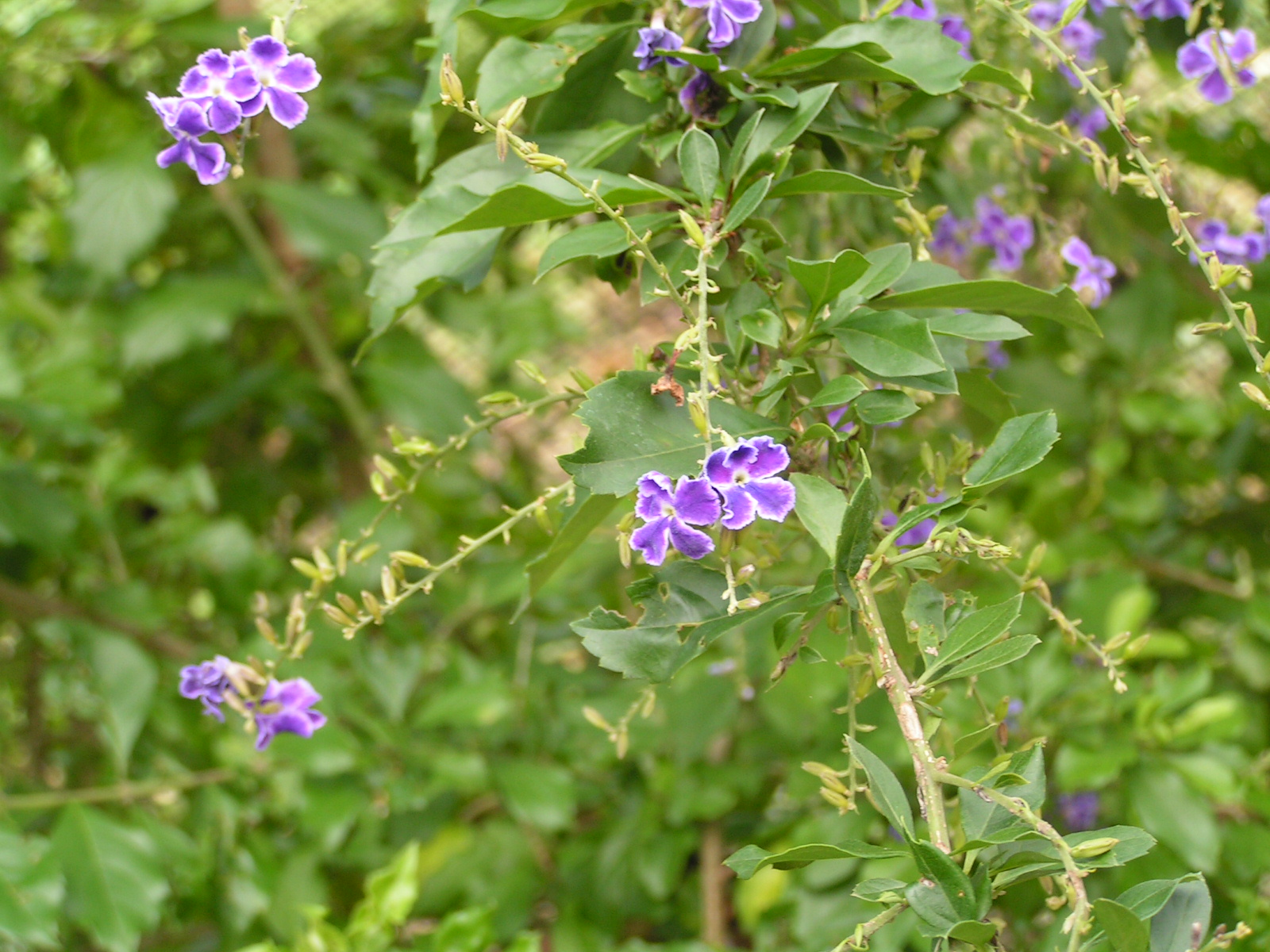
Duranta

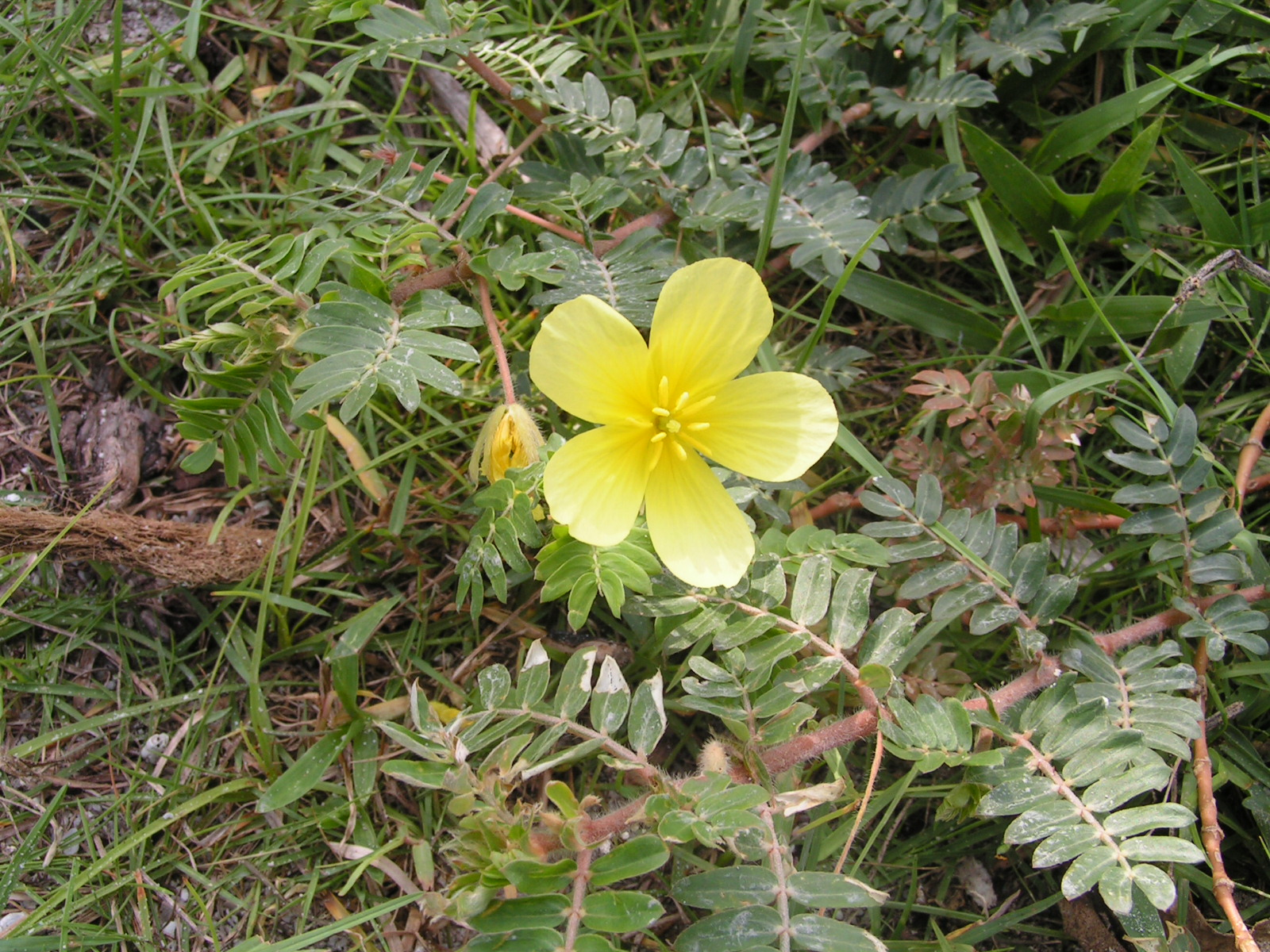
yellow flower

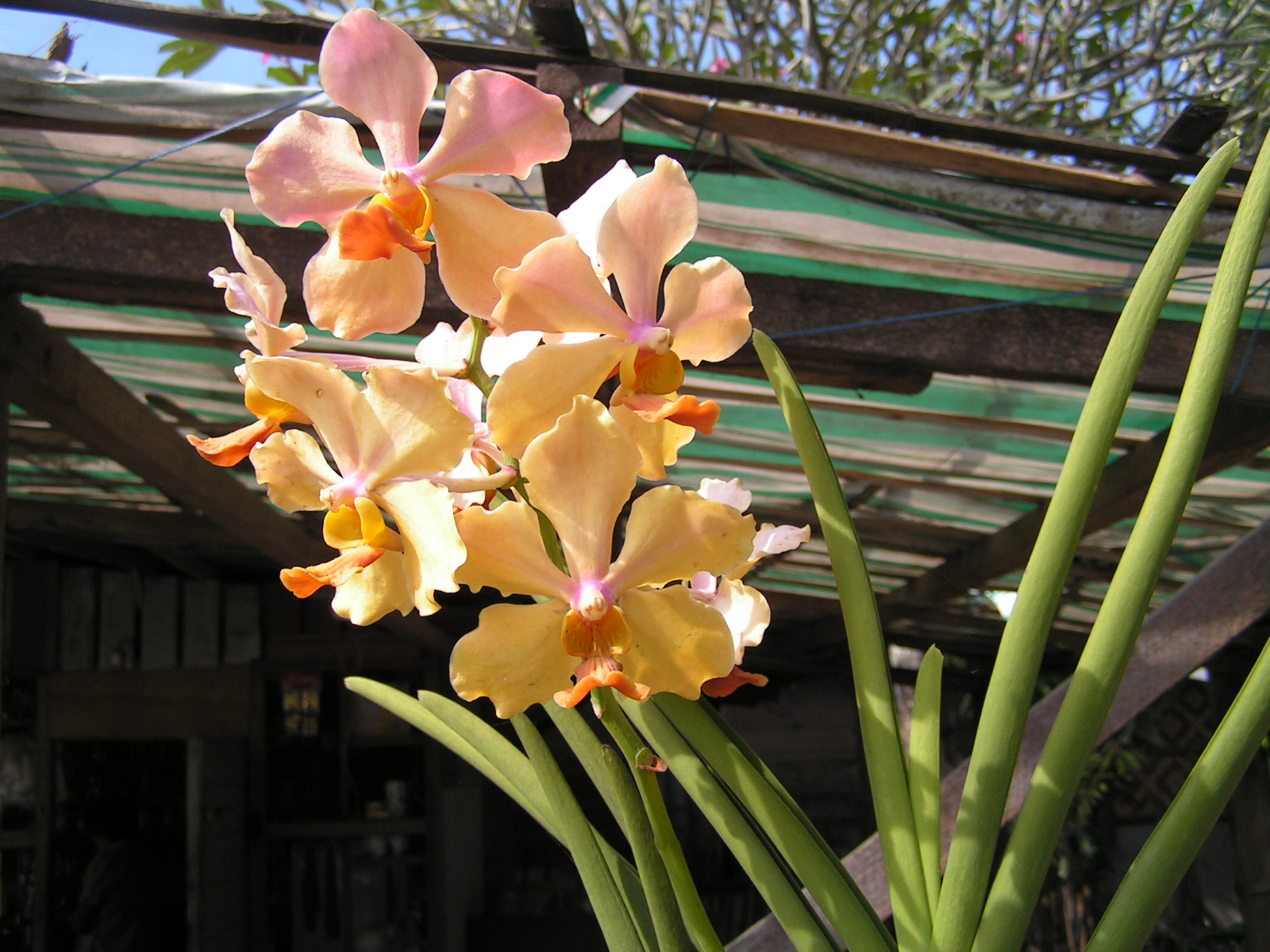
Orchids

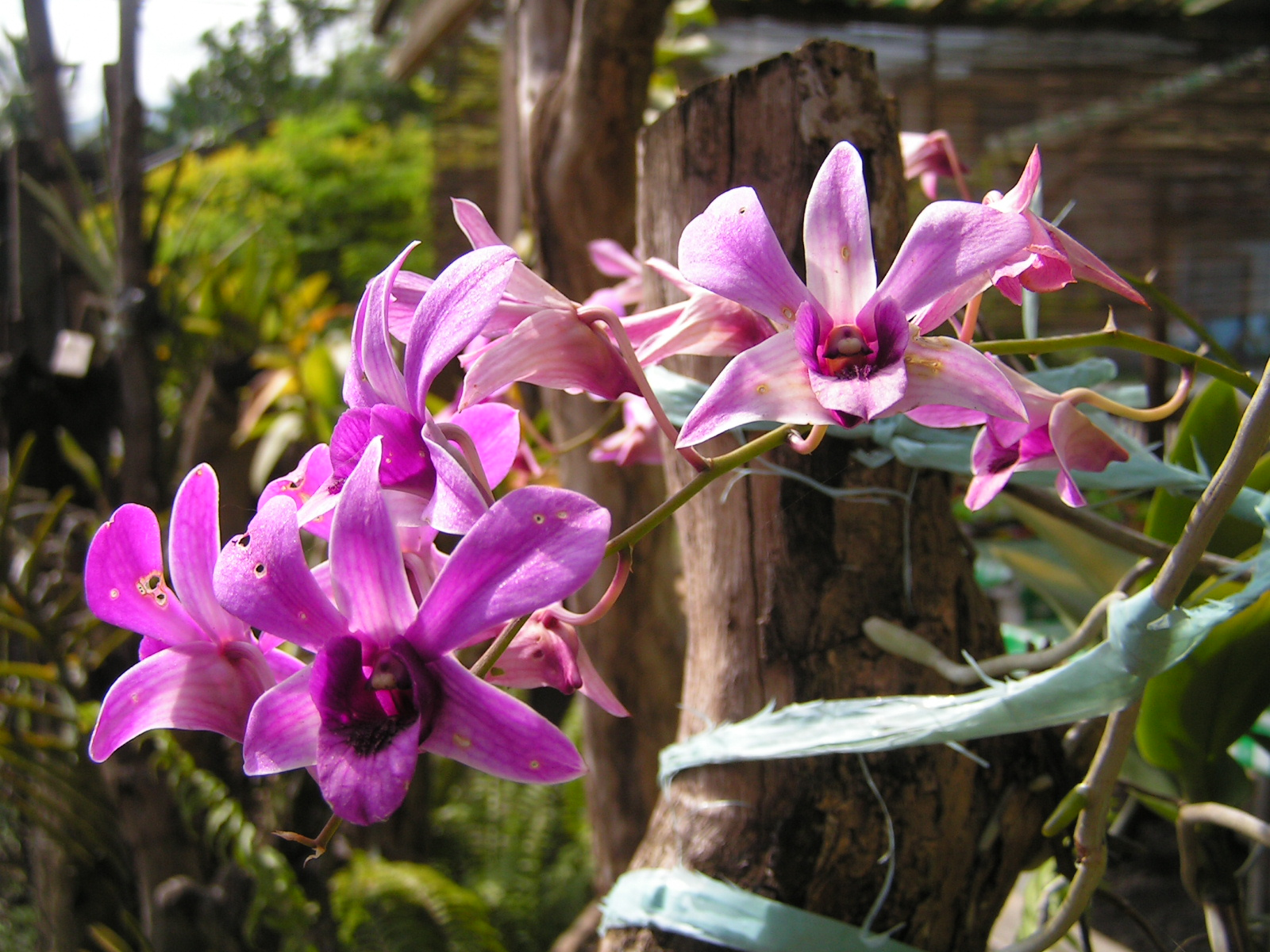
Vanda orchids

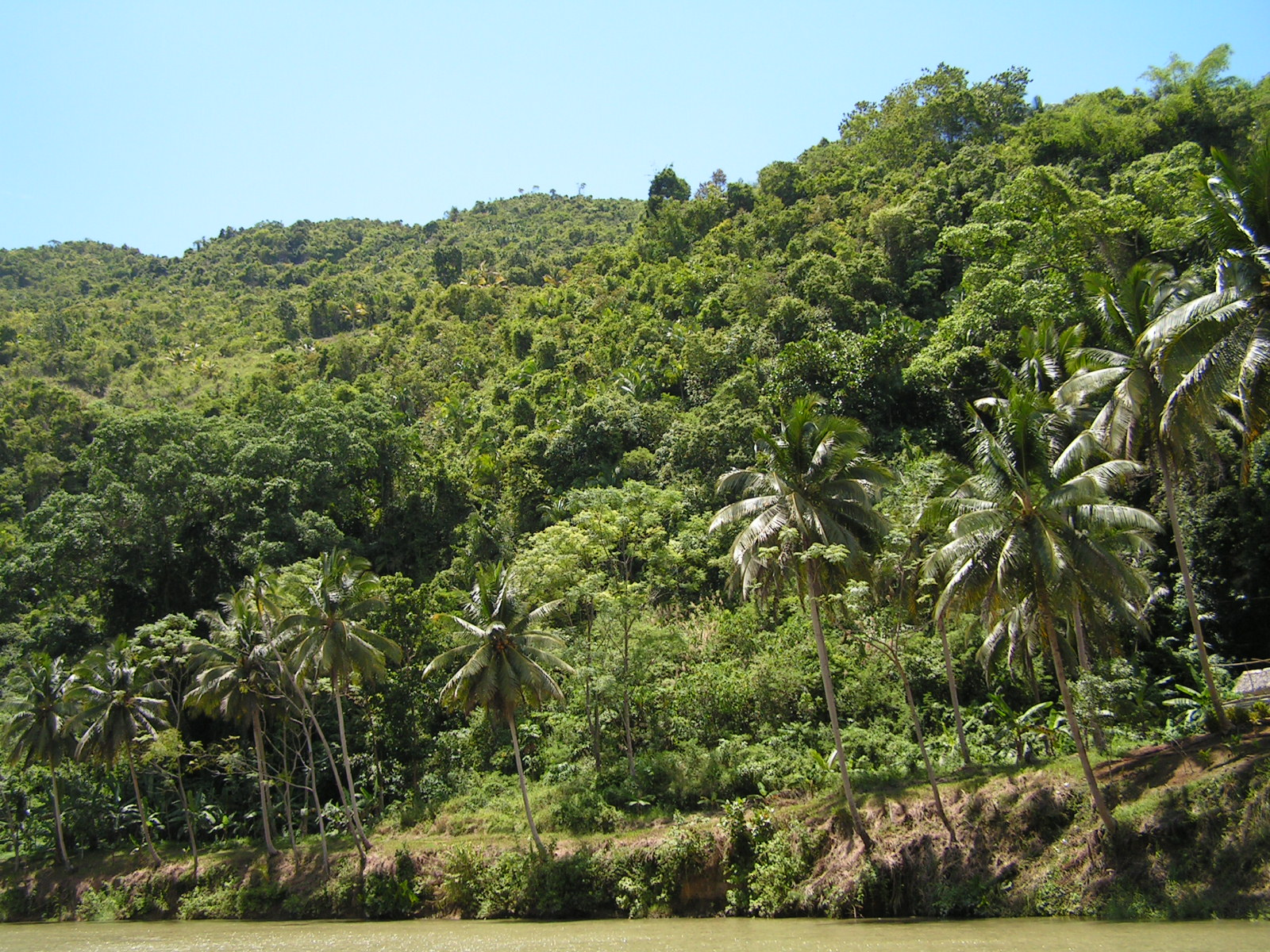
lush vegetation of hills in Loboc, Bohol taken while on a river cruise upstream

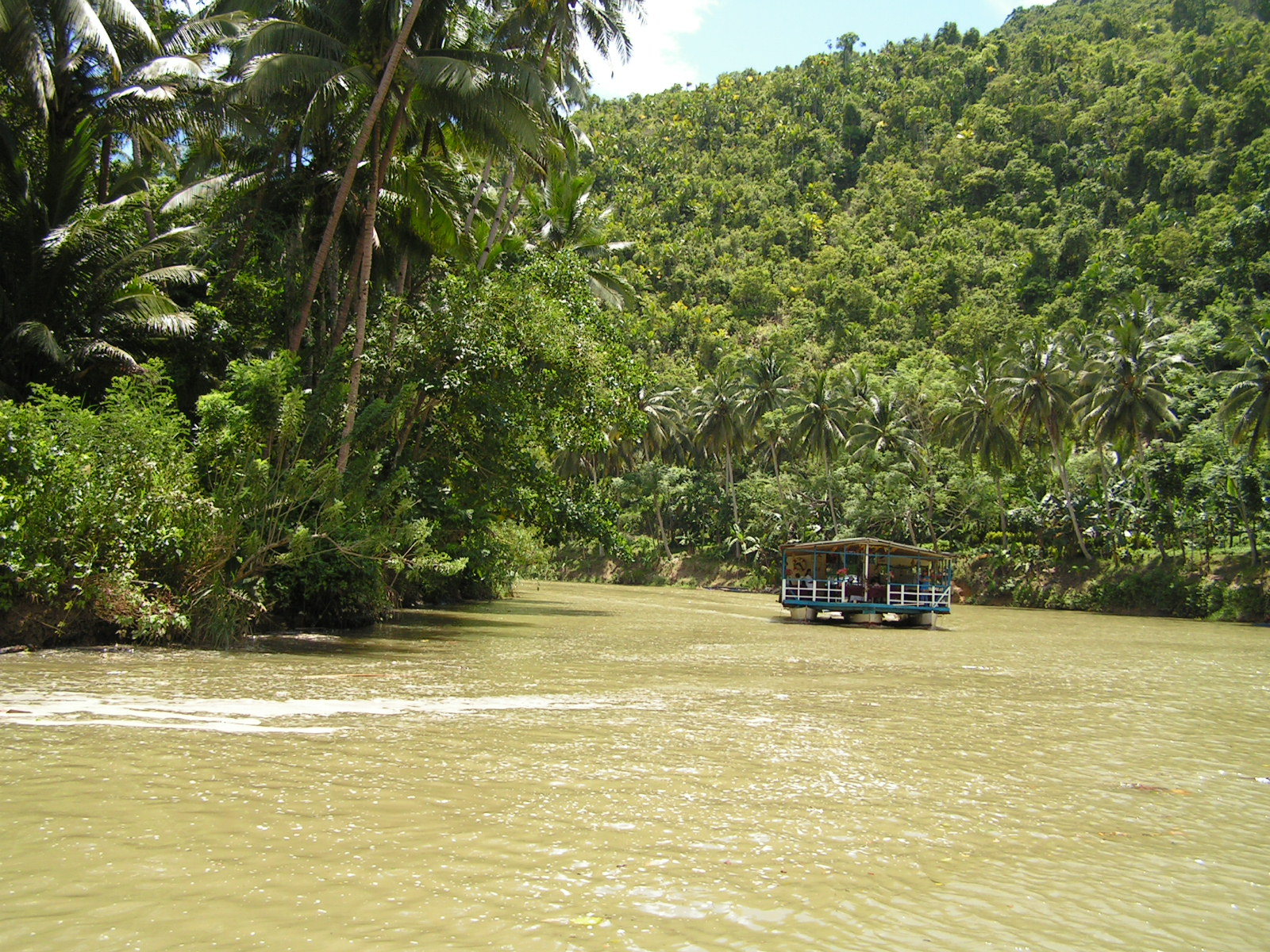
plants along the Loboc, Bohol River banks taken while on a river cruise upstream

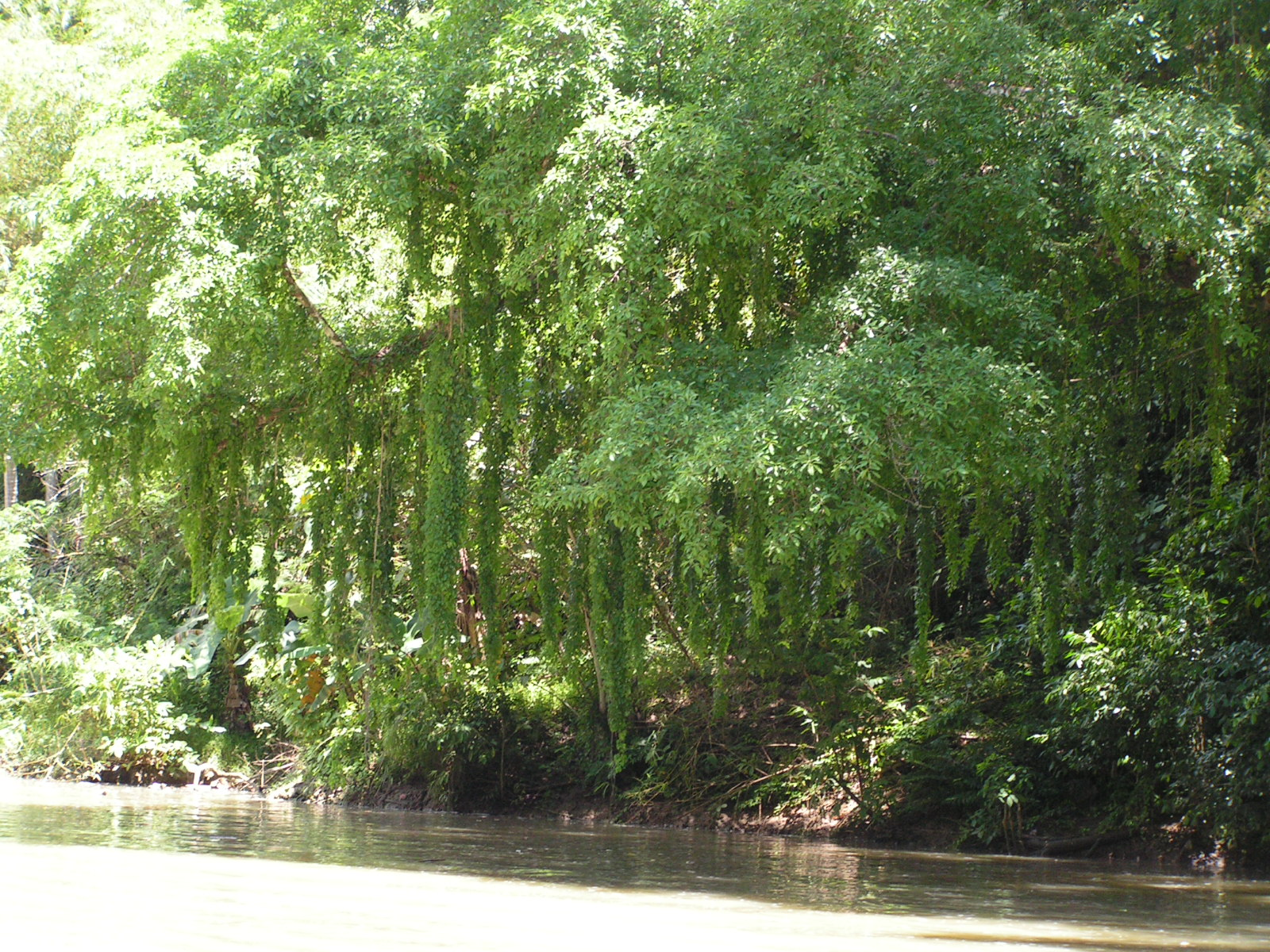
plants along the Loboc, Bohol River banks taken while on a river cruise upstream

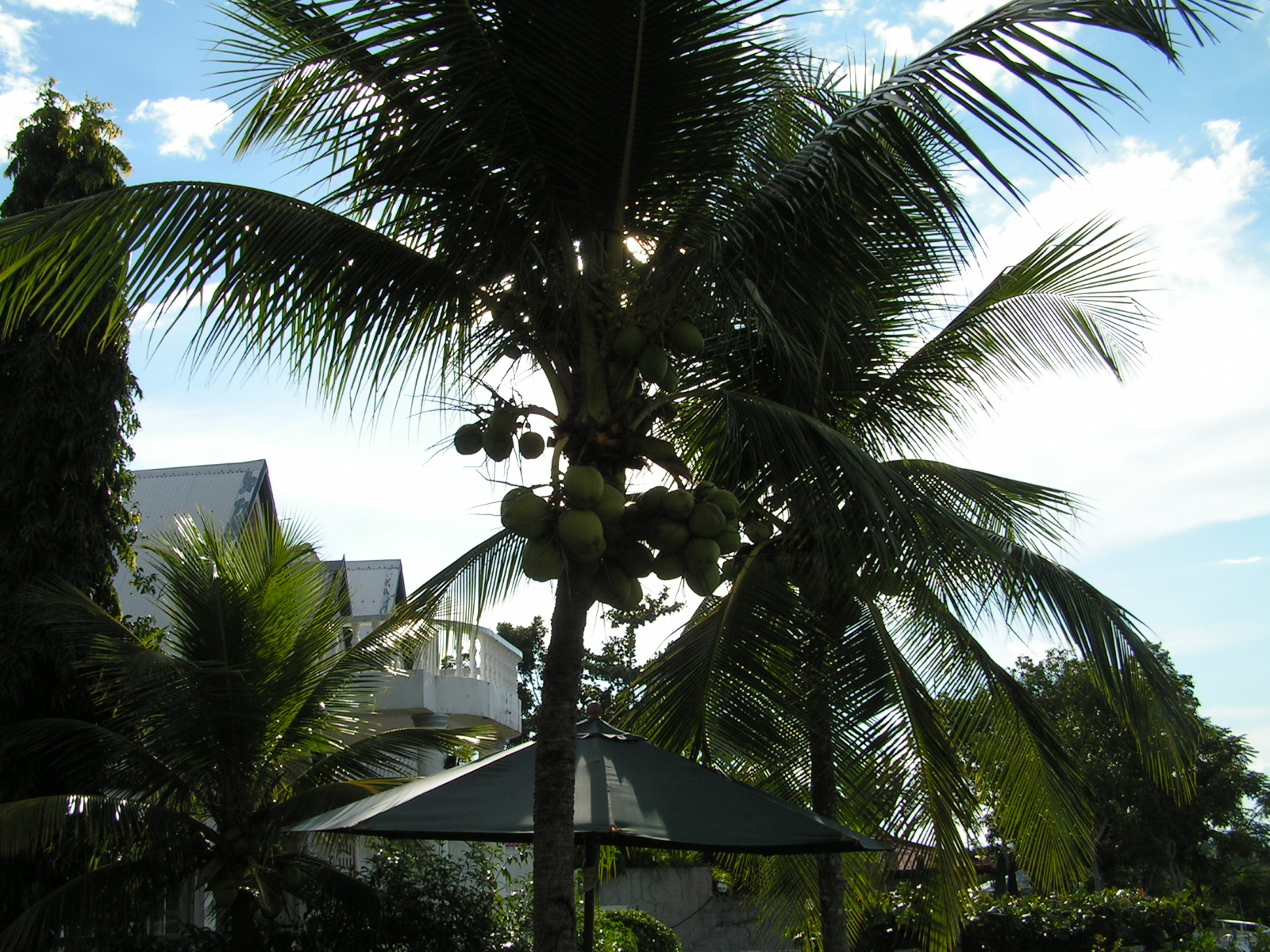
Coconut trees (Cocos nucifera) in Dauis, Bohol, Philippines

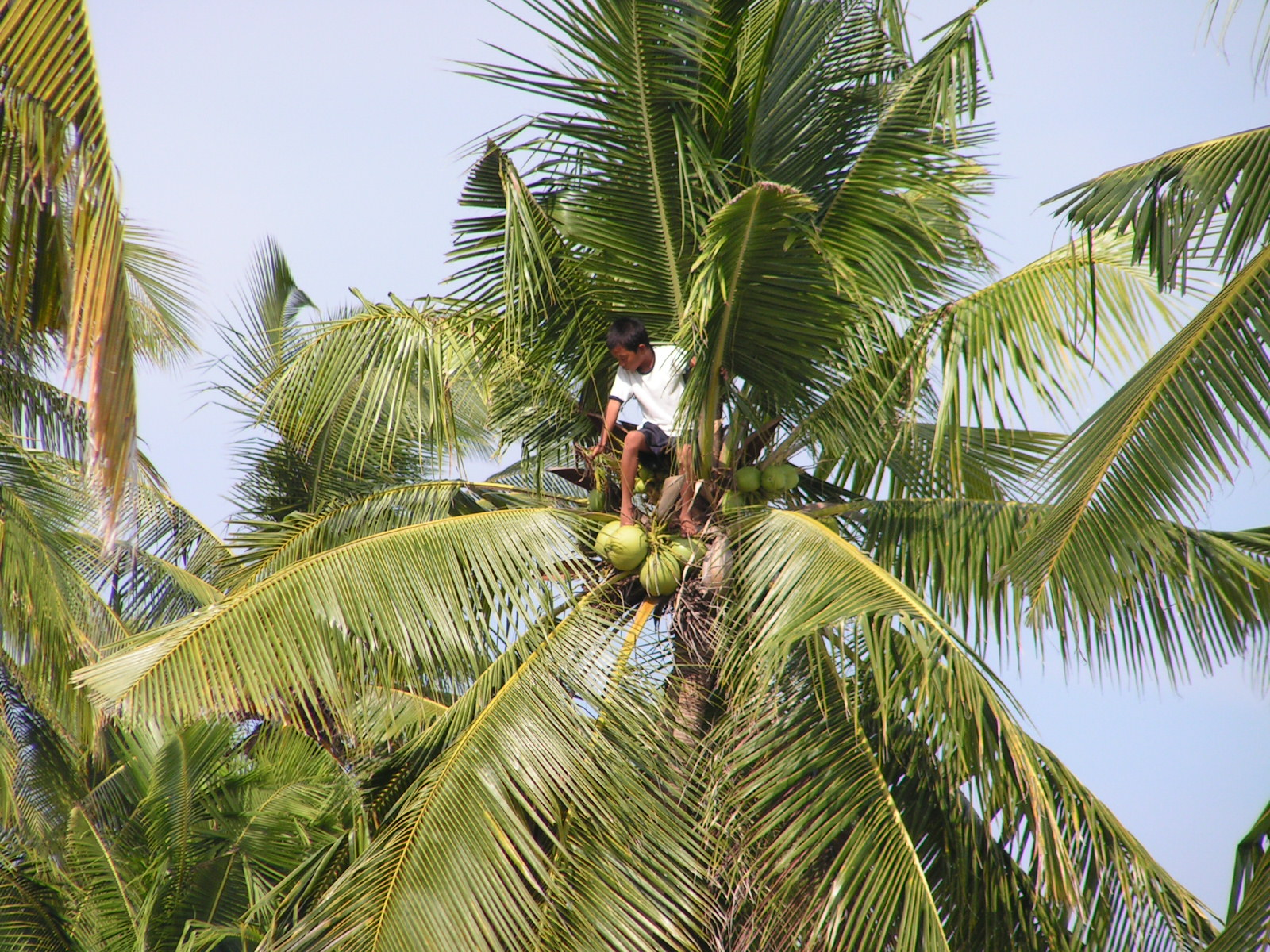
harvesting coconuts from Coconut trees (Cocos nucifera) in Panglao, Bohol, Philippines

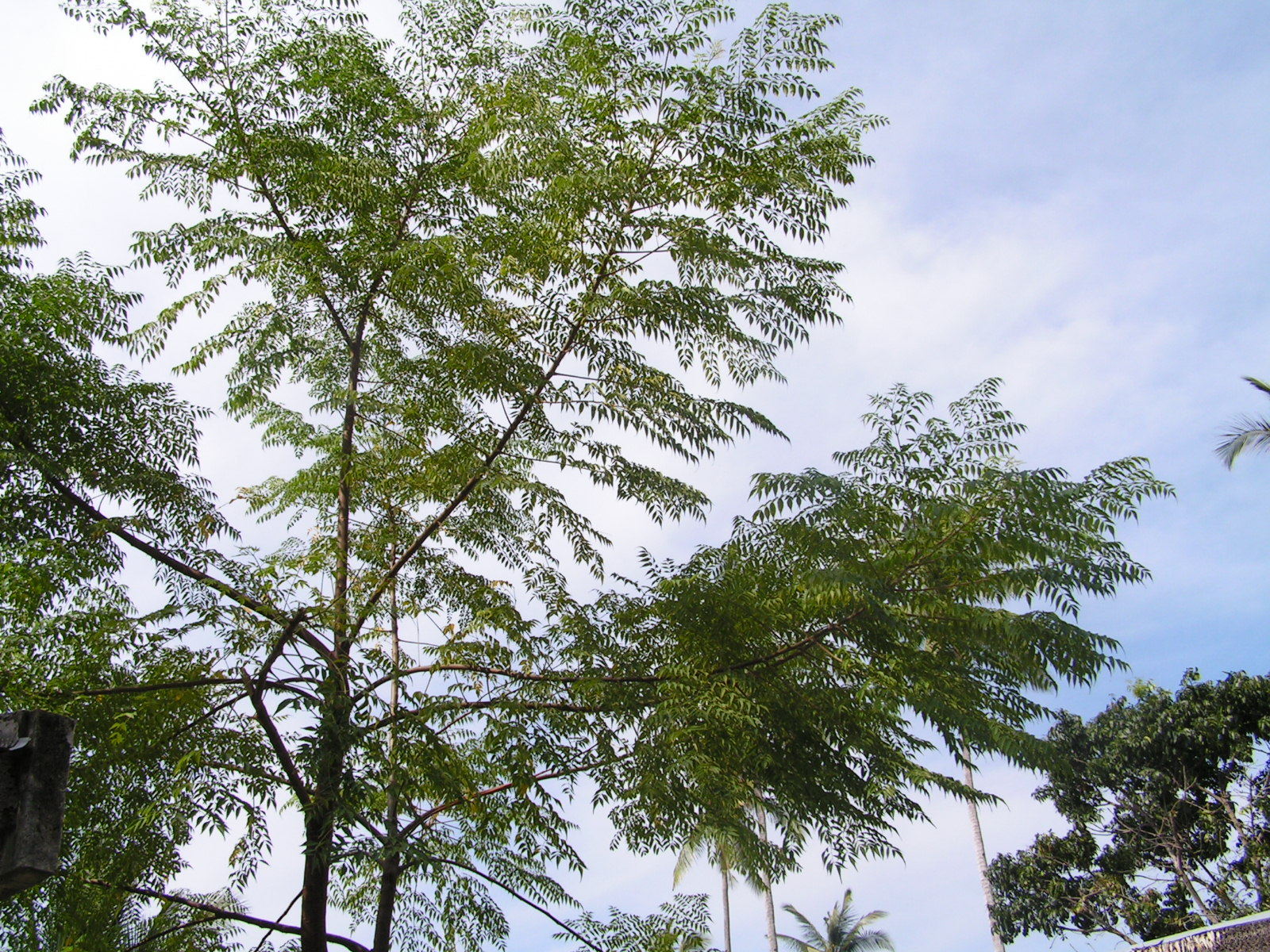
Neem tree in Panglao, Bohol, Philippines

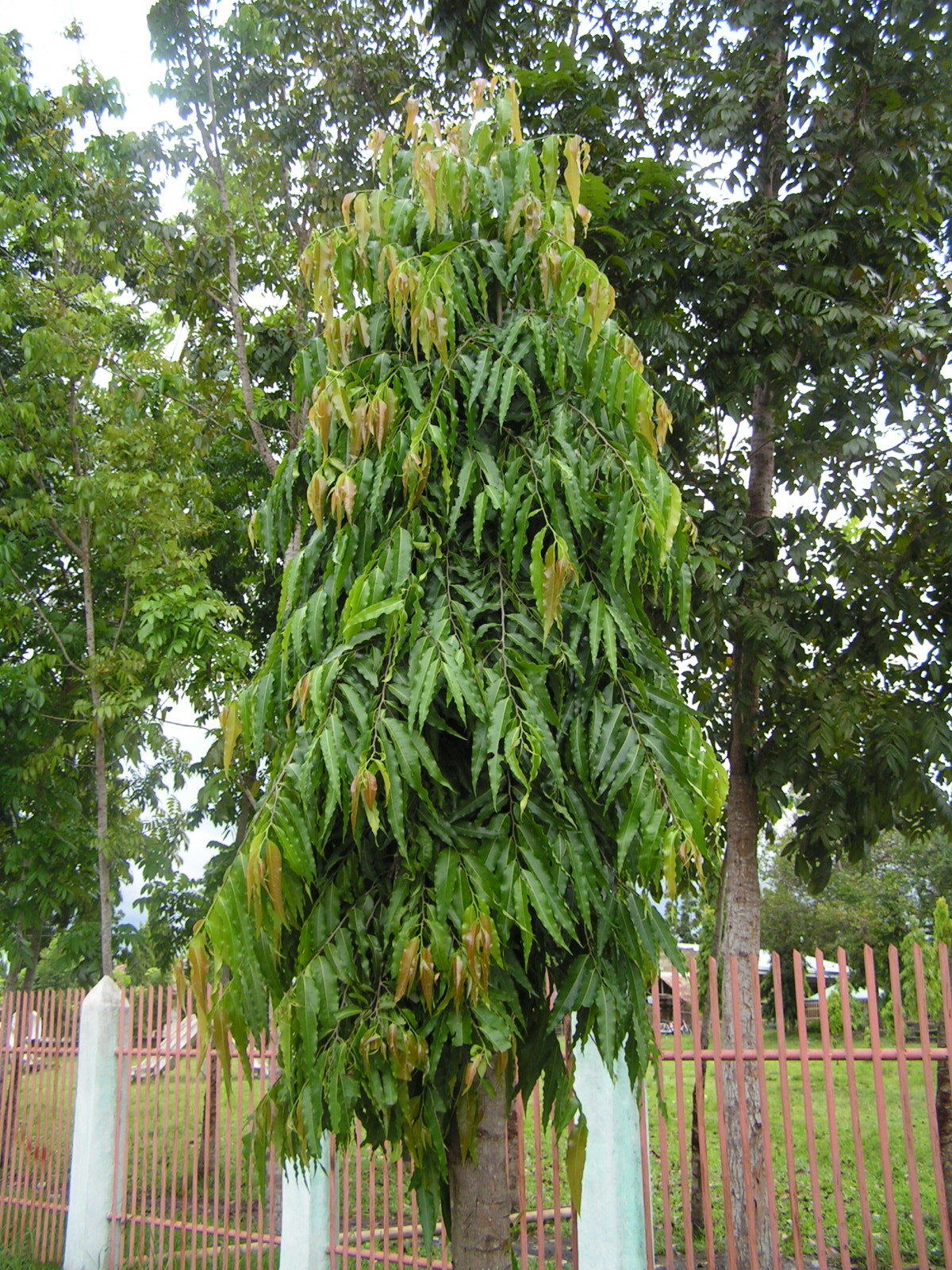
Indian tree in Ubay, Bohol, Philippines

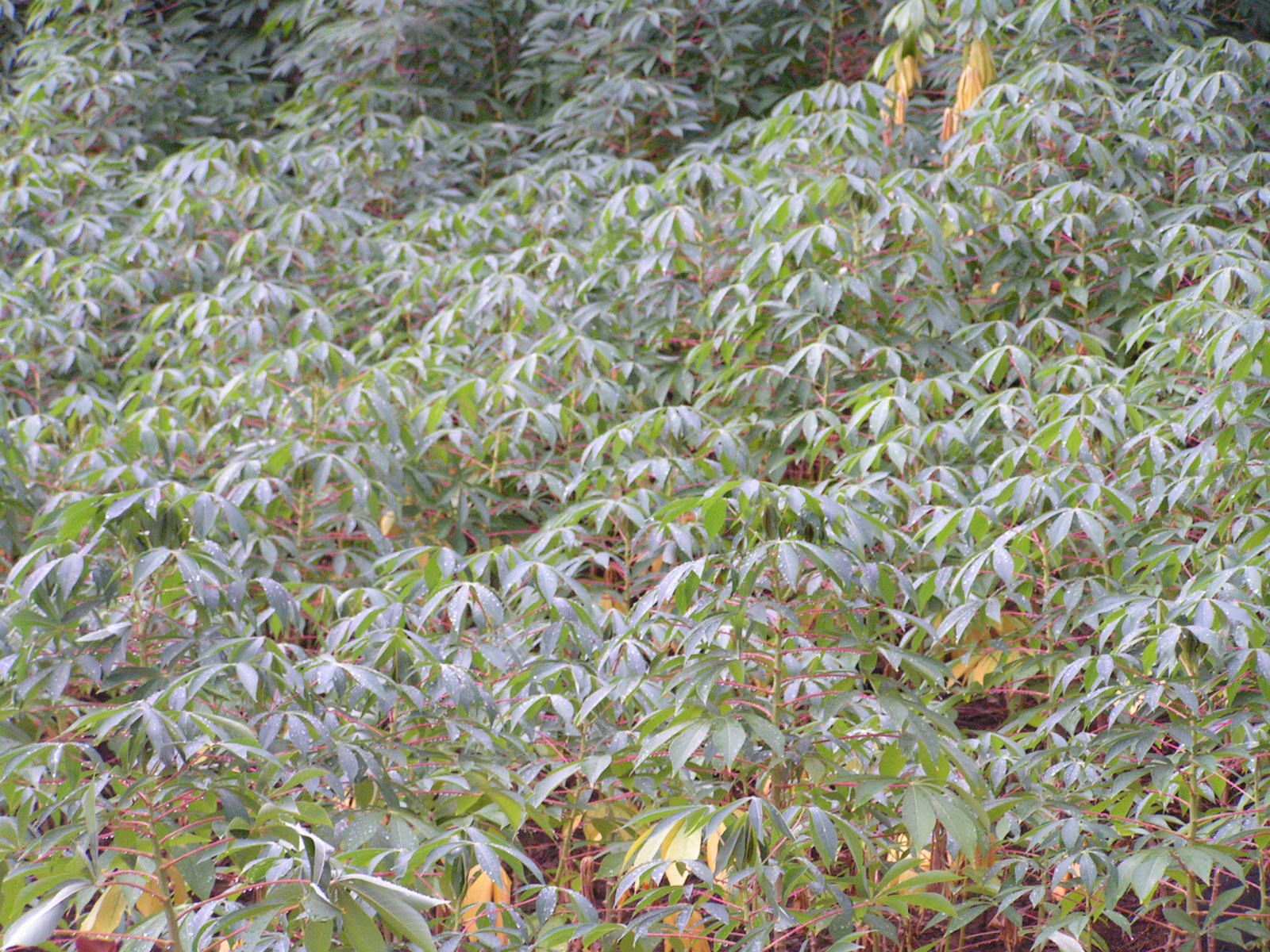
balanghoy (cassava) plantation in Ubay, Bohol, Philippines

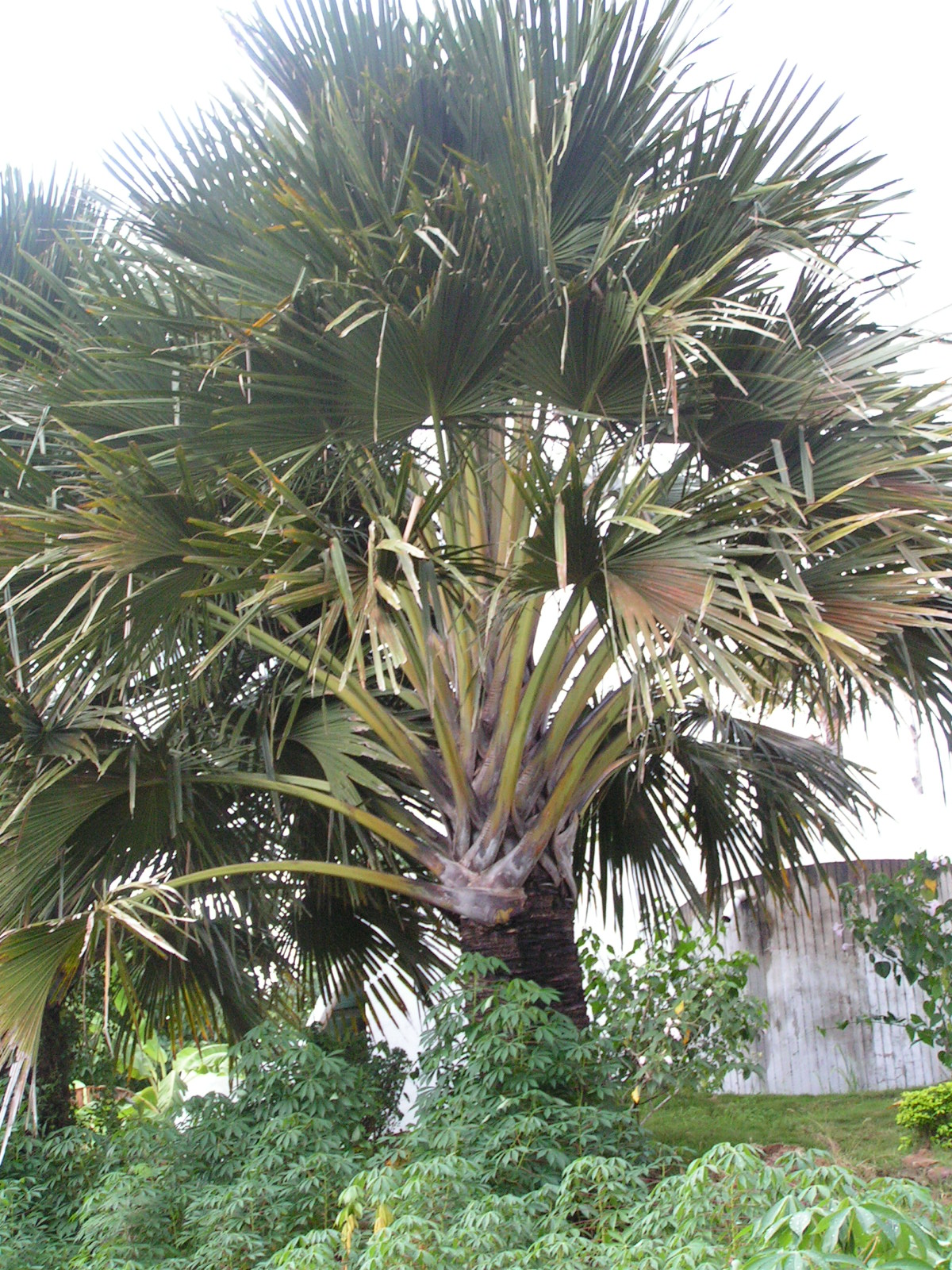
bulí or buri tree in the Philippines

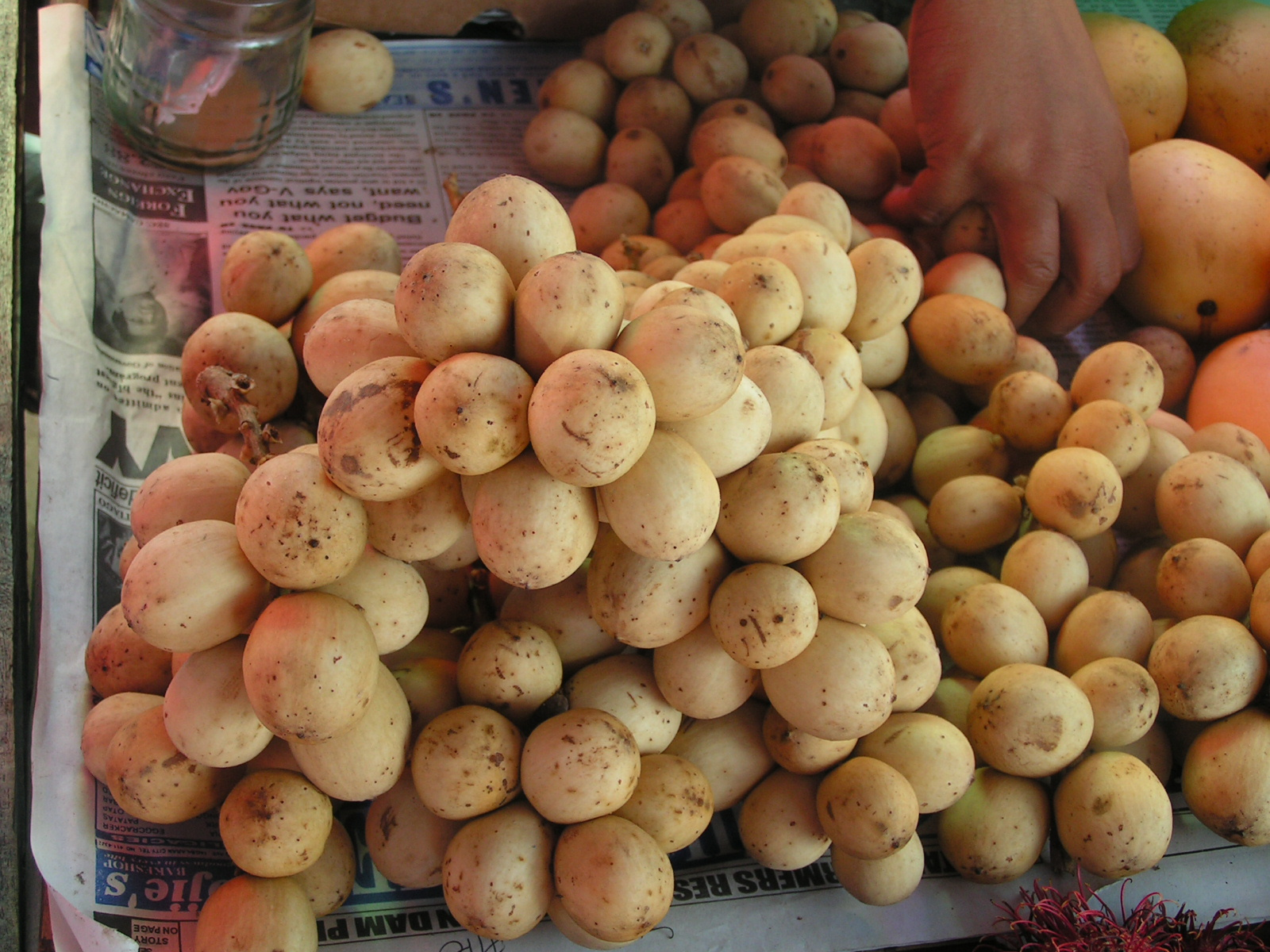
lanzones in Ubay, Bohol, Philippines

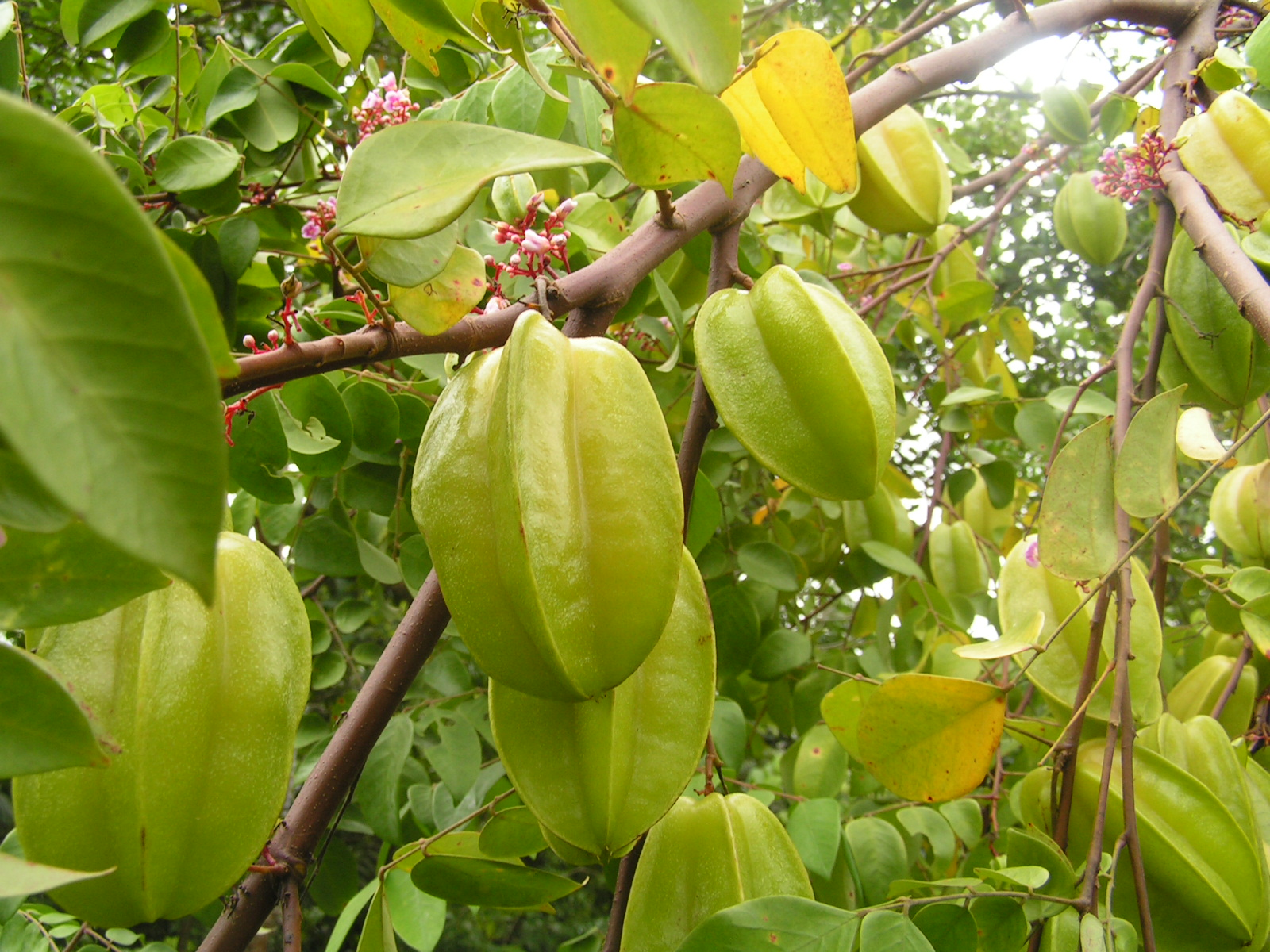
balingbing in Ubay, Bohol, Philippines

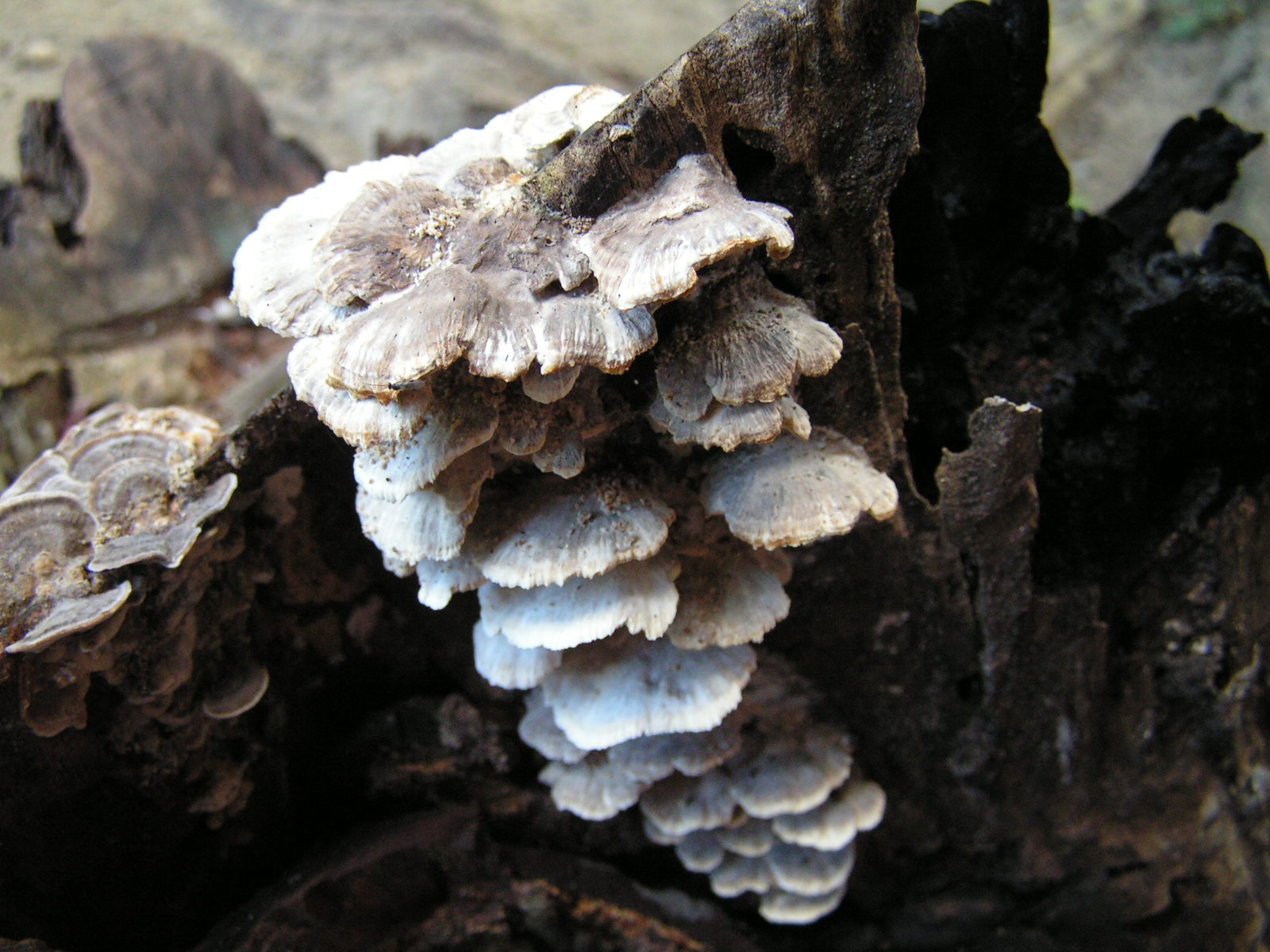
lichens

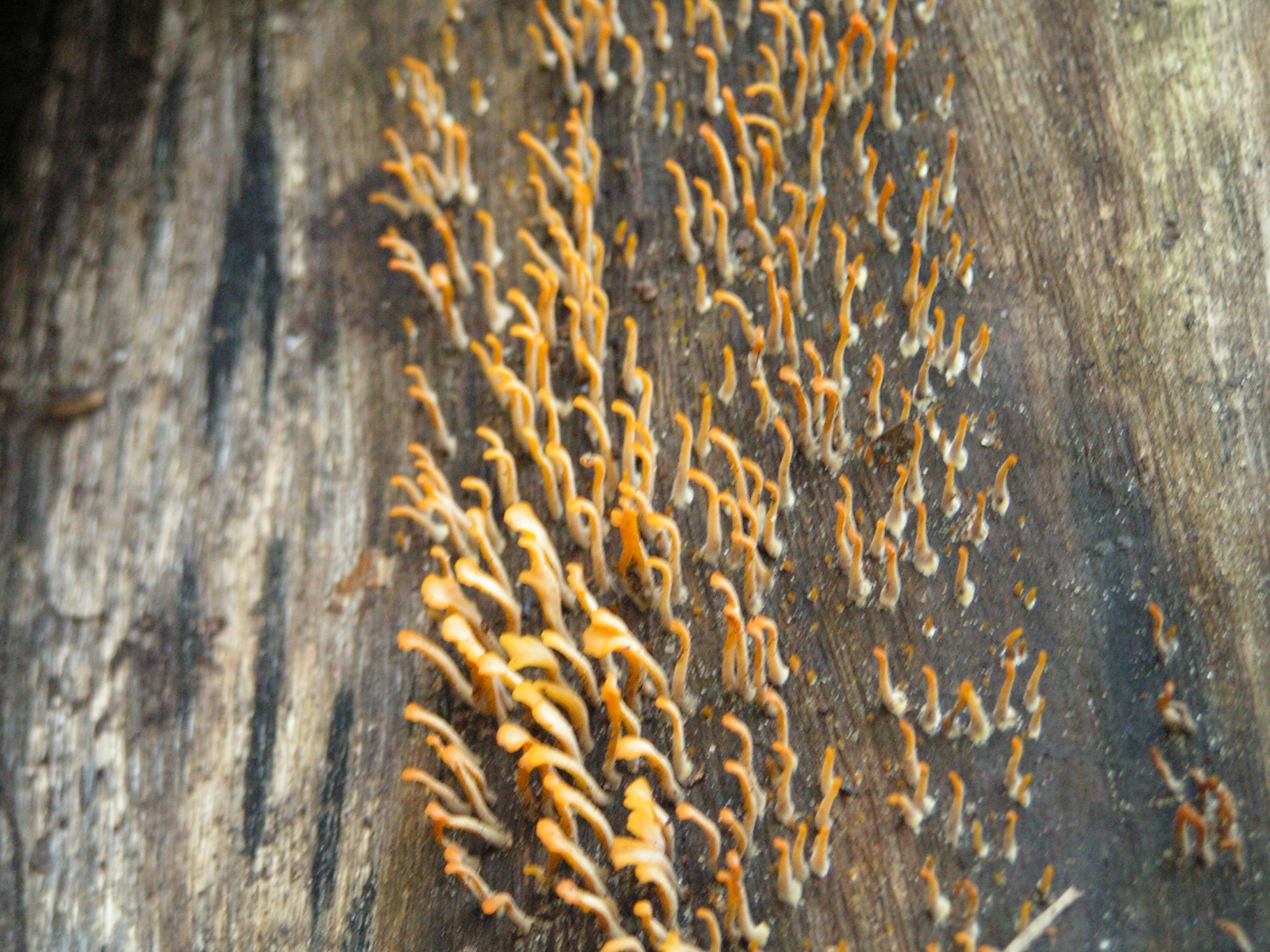
lichens2

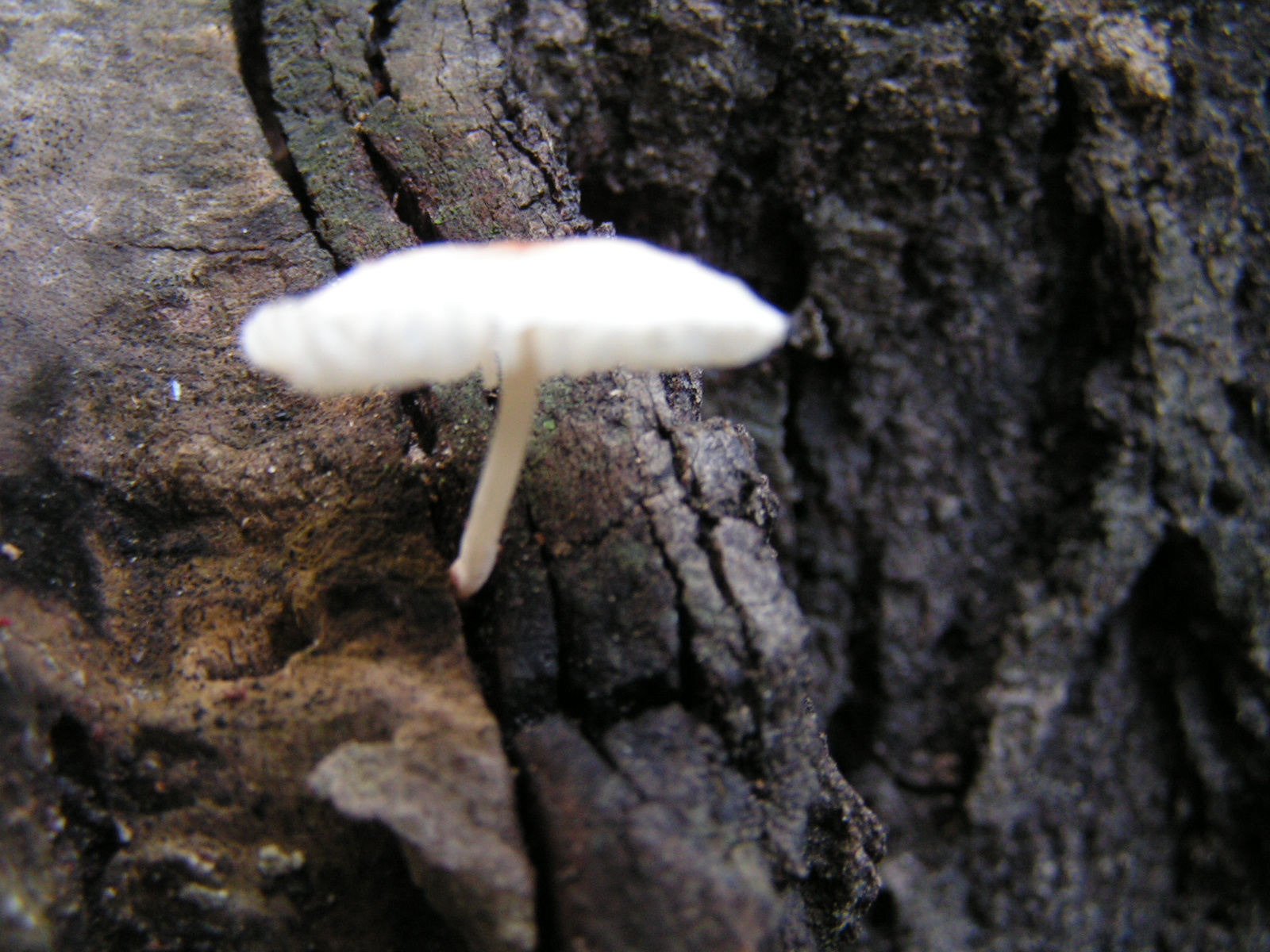
mushroom

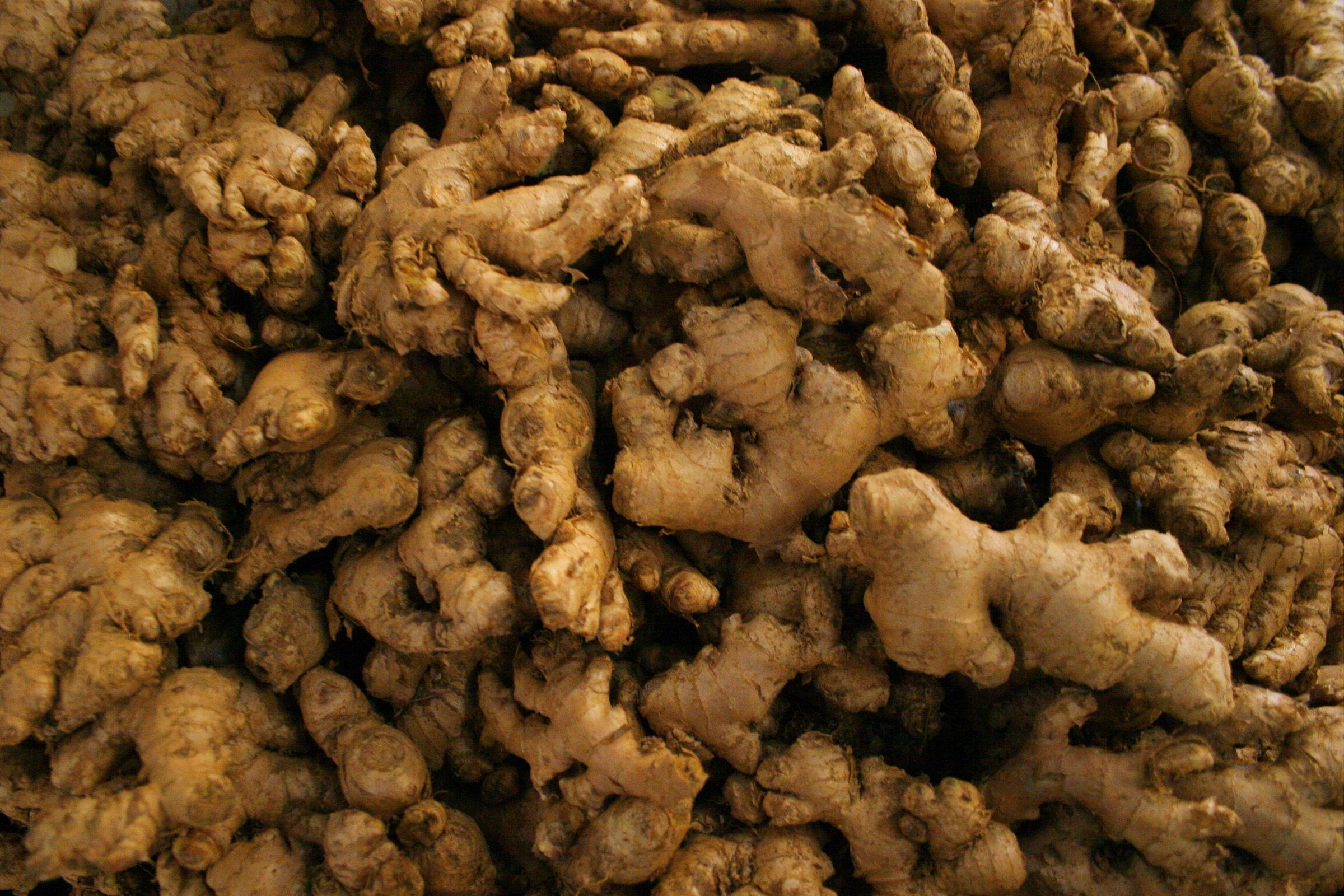
Ginger or luy-a

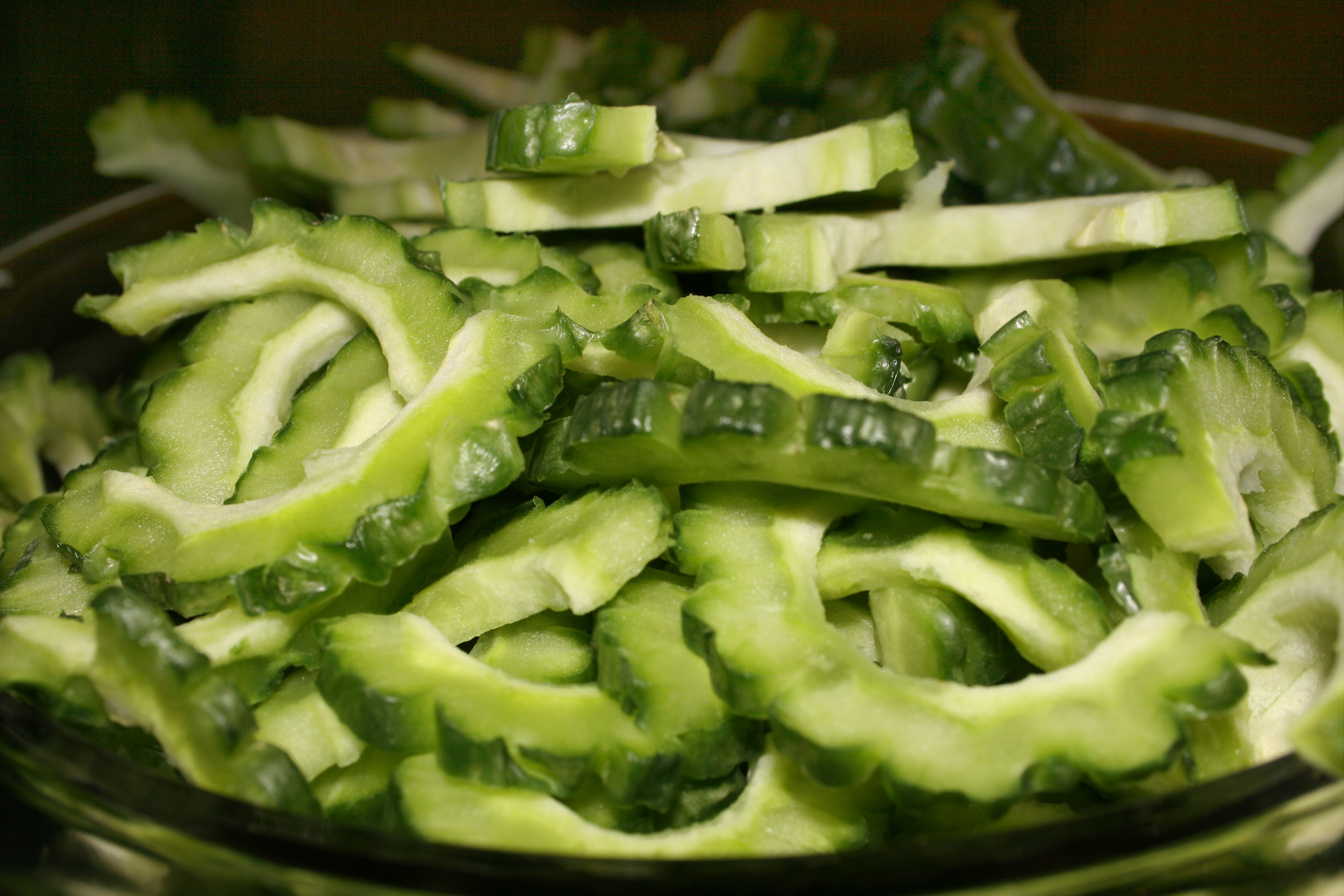
Bitter melon or ampalaya; also paliya or palija

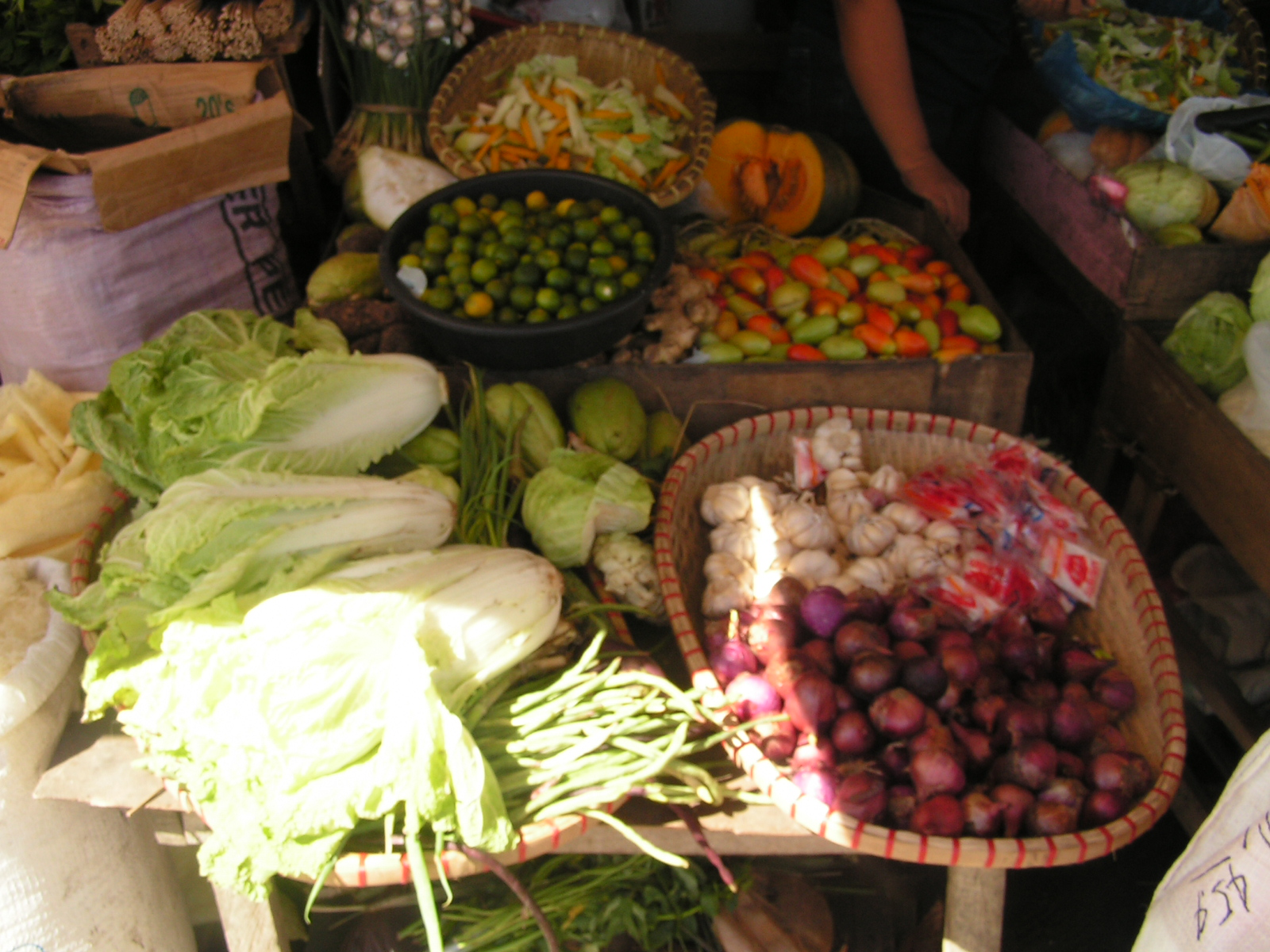
Vegetables at Ubay, Bohol Public Market

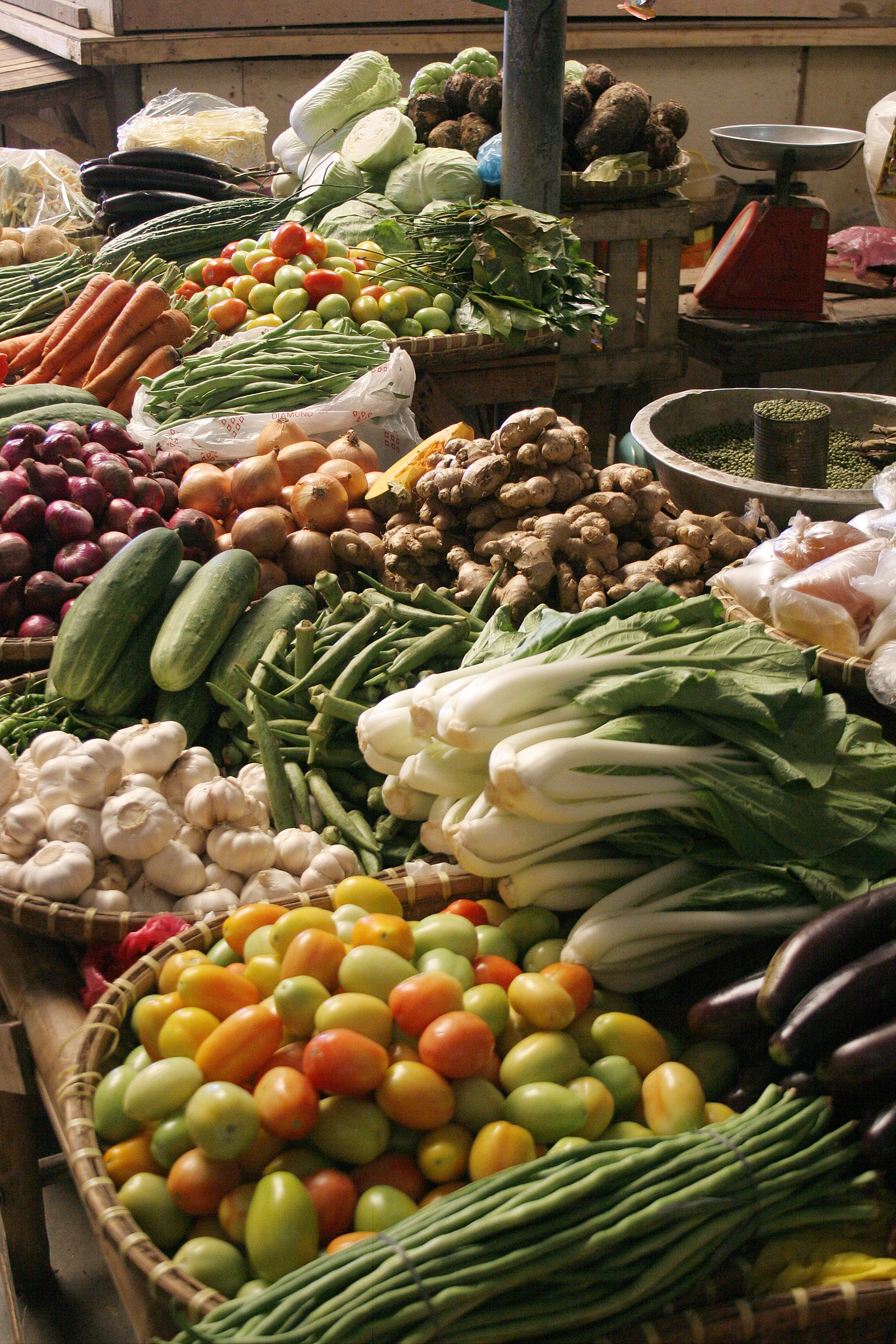
More vegetables at the market

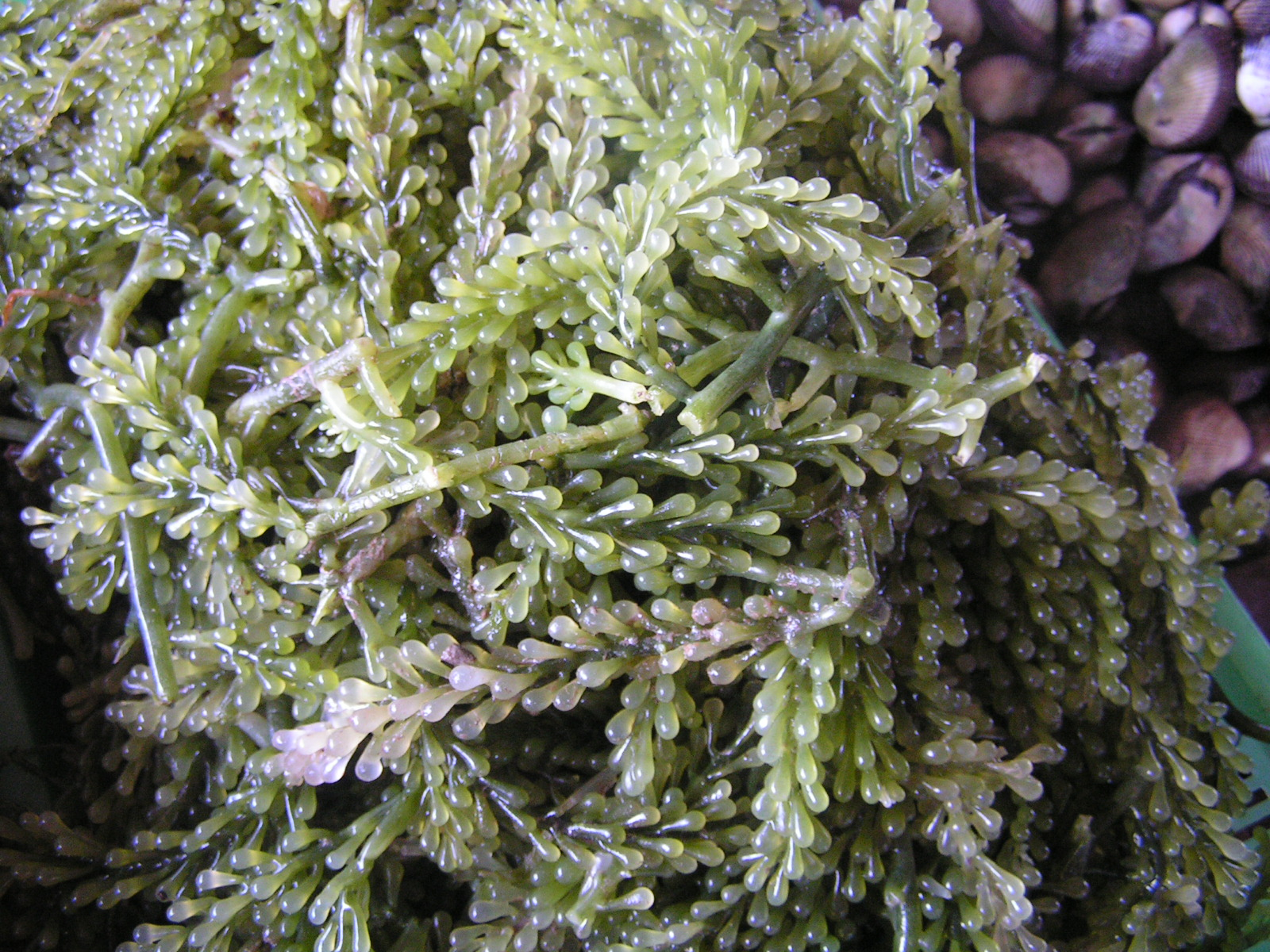
latô (Caulerpa)

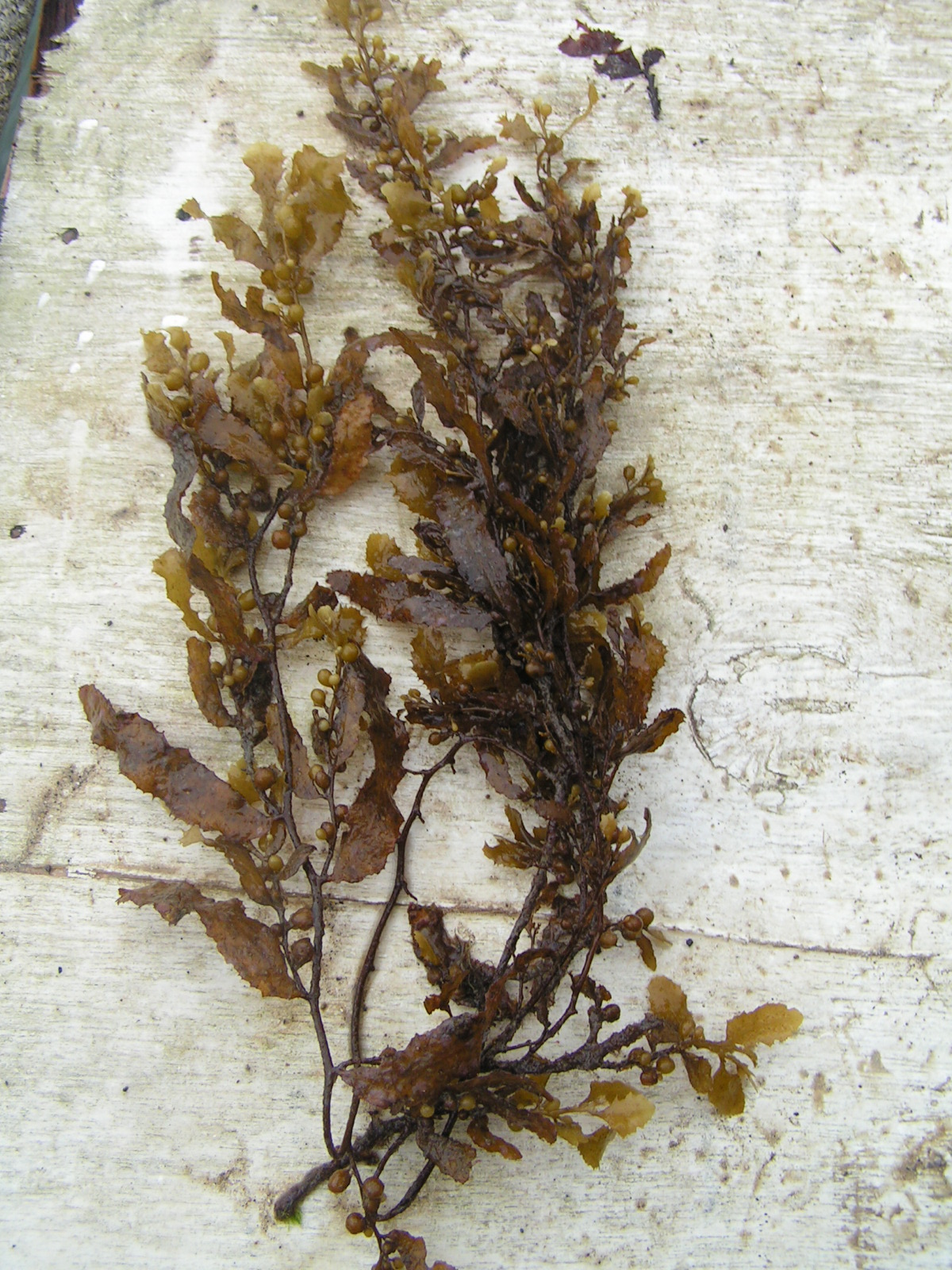
samô (Sargassum)

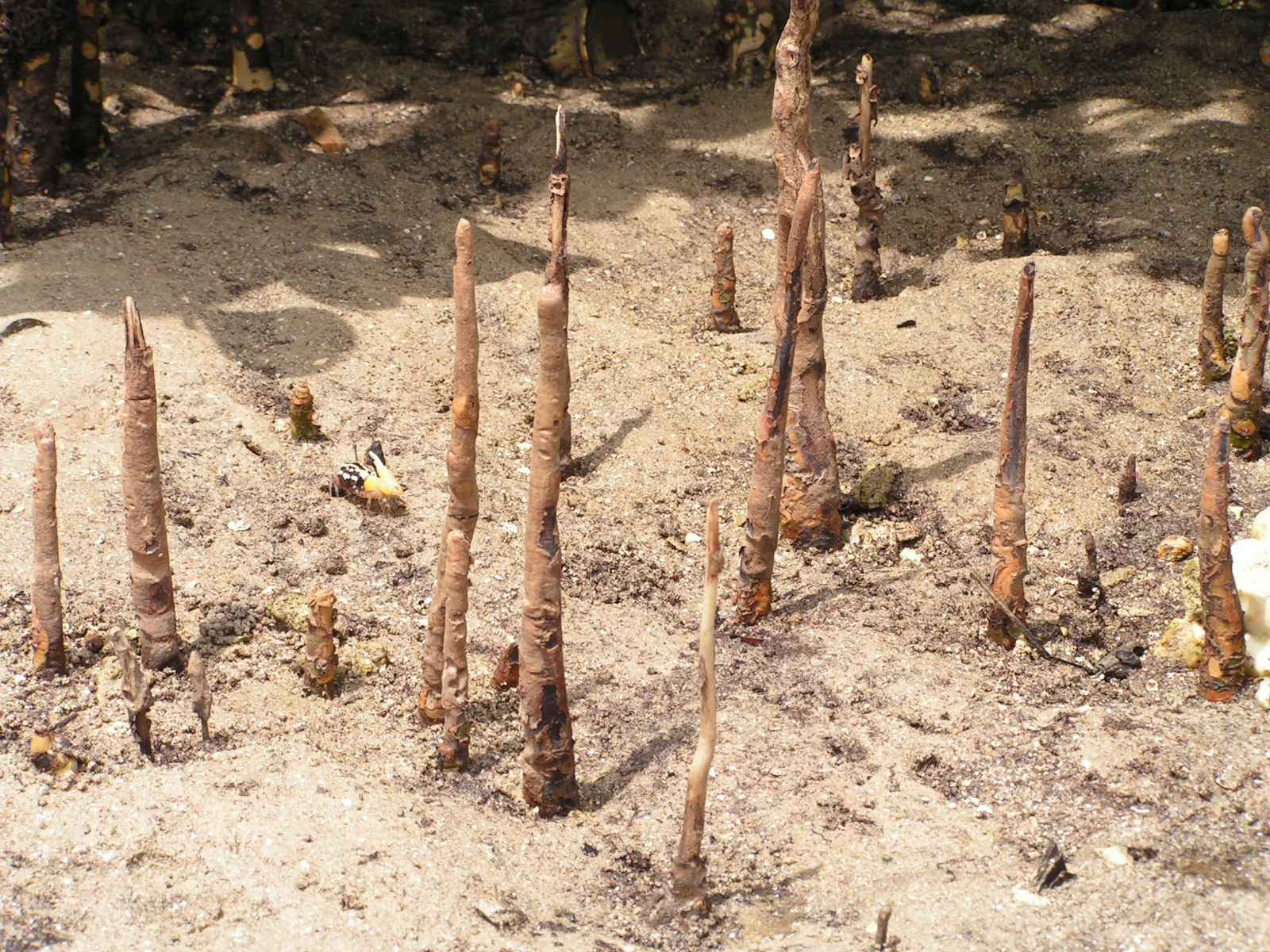
pneumatophores of mangroves in Bohol

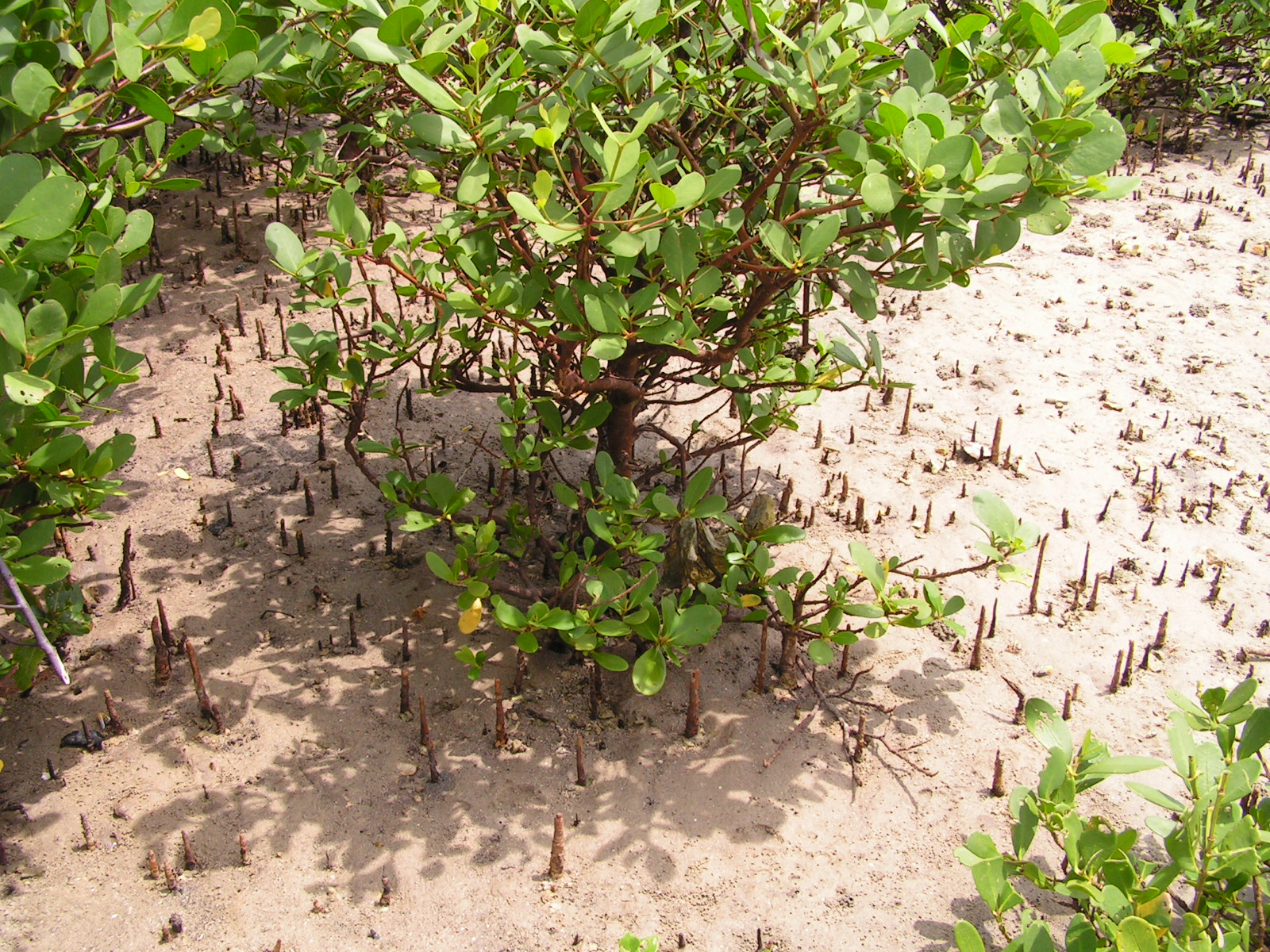
pagatpat or mangrove in Bohol, Philippines

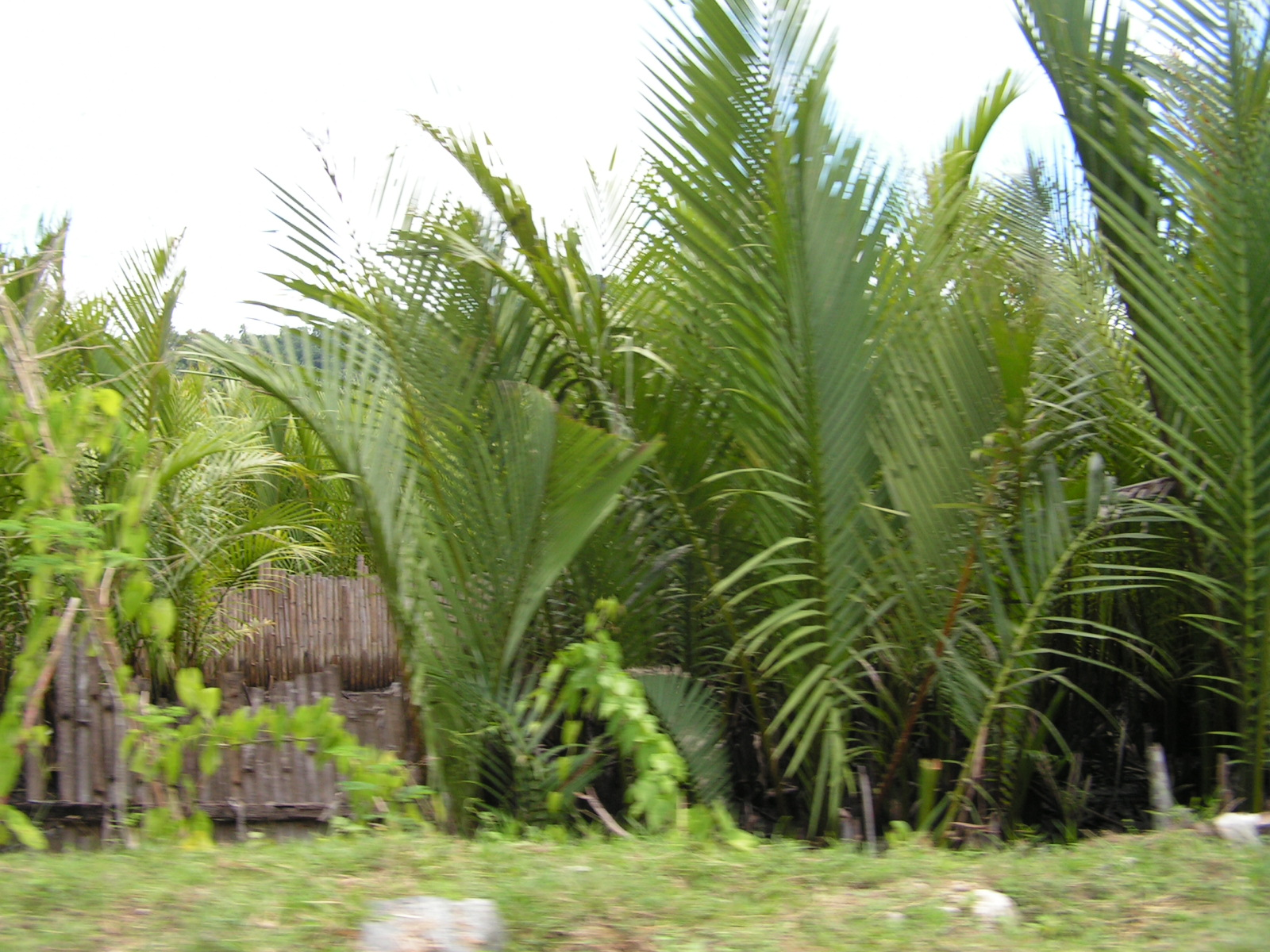
Nipa or Nypa fruticans

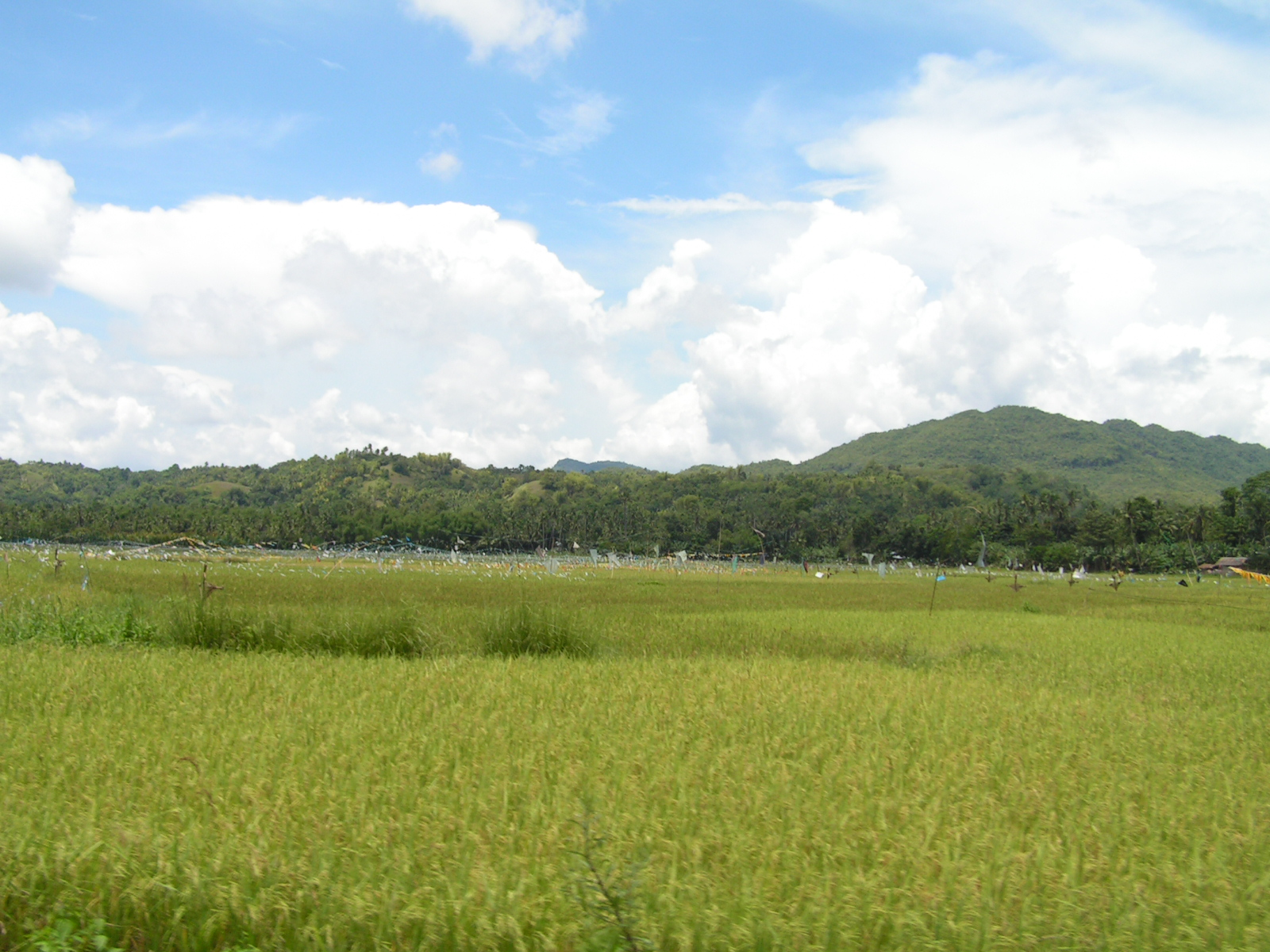
Ricefields in Loboc, Bohol (Oryza sativa)

== List of Bohol Fauna ==
=== Mammals ===
1. baka – Philippine cow; Bos taurus
2. Baboy ihás – baboy damó; wild boar; Sus scrofa
3. bóngcaras – sea cow; Dugong dugon
4. dugong – manatee; Trichechus Linnaeus, 1758
5. kabaw – kalabaw; Carabao; Bubalus bubalis carabanesis
6. mawmag, mamag, tarsius – Philippine tarsier; Tarsius syrichta
7. Kwaknit or kabog – bats; order Chiroptera
8. Kagwang – Philippine flying lemur; Cynocephalus volans
9. Sigbin – kangaroo ?
10. unggoy – monkey; macaque; Philippine long-tailed macaque; Macaca fascicularis philippinensis
11. monkeys
12. milô, musang – common palm civet; Paradoxurus hermaphroditus

=== Annelid ===
1. alimátok – Leech; Hirudo medicinalis
2. earthworm; Lumbricus terrestris

=== Arthropods ===
1. Centipede Class Chilopoda locally known as ulhipan
2. labód- Millipede; Class Diplopoda

=== Reptiles ===
1. Python; Python reticulatus; reticulated python
2. iyón or iwón – Philippine turtle; Chelonia
3. ahas – snake
4. baksan
5. hawo – bayawak; monitor lizard; Varanus salvator
6. Tikî or tabilí – house lizard;
7. Tukô – Gecko gecko
8. tawoto (taloto)
9. ibid
10. buaya
11. baki
12. ambubukad
13. cobra

=== Birds (Ibon) ===
1. agul-ol
2. banog
3. Antolihaw – dimodlaw; oriole; Oriulus chinensis
4. Tamsi – sunbird;
5. Tocmo
6. iling
7. maya
8. Pabo – Turkey; Meleagris gallopavo
9. itik – Pateros duck
10. Pato – Muscovy duck
11. Gansa – Geese
12. Agila – Philippine eagle; Pithecophaga jefferyi
13. Uwák – crow; Corone philippina
14. uwák – Philippine crow; Corvus
15. salampati or pati – dove
16. Pigeon
17. Alimokón
18. Kuwagô – Philippine owl; Bubo bubo
19. Manok bisaya – native chicken; Gallus gallus domesticus
20. sunóy – rooster
21. Manok ugís
22. Philippine serpent eagle Spilornis holospilus
23. brahminy kite
24. woodpecker
25. rocky-tailed blue-headed parrot
26. grass owl
27. scoop owl
28. bubock pigeon
29. water cock
30. parakeets
31. reel

=== Insects ===
1. alibangbang – butterfly
2. lamók – mosquito
3. langaw – flies
4. uk-ok – cockroach; ipis (Tag.)
5. amigas or hulmigas – red ants; langgam (Tag.)
6. sum – black ants (read soom)
7. atitud – small ants
8. anay – white ants
9. aninipot – Fireflies
10. don don or lukton – grasshopper
11. buyóg or bujog – bees
12. gangis – cricket
13. beetle
14. putyukan or putjukan – honey bees

=== Fish (Isdâ) ===
1. andohaw 'mackerel fish'
2. bakasí 'hawig'
3. bakáy
4. baksawan
5. banák – family magulidae, mullet
6. bangsi 'flying fish'
7. bangús – milkfish; Chanos chanos
8. barilis – Neothunnus macropterus; yellowfin Tuna
9. bawô 'needle fish'
10. bolinaw – Encrasicholina oligobranchus; Philippine anchovy
11. botete 'pupper fish'
12. burot burot
13. dalág – Ophicephalus striatus, Murrel
14. danggit – Siganid
15. hasâ hasâ
16. isdâ sa bató
17. ketong [golden rabbit fish]
18. kujóg
19. lapulapu – Family Serranidae; Grouper
20. malasugí
21. mansi
22. molmol [parrot fish]
23. pantat
24. pómpano
25. samín samín
26. sugí
27. sunghanunicorn fish'
28. tambasakan
29. tangigue
30. tilapia – Tilapia; Tilapia zili
31. tulingan frigged tuna
32. tuna
33. blue marlin
34. mackerel
35. salmon
36. silver sea bass – Lates calcarifer;
37. Goby
38. sea catfish – Family Ariidae
39. labajan lupit wrasse – Family Labridae
40. silver perch or therapon, – Leiopotherapon plumbeus
41. pakol 'queen triggerfish'
42. lapad-lapad
43. budboron
44. solid
45. tagotongan porcupine fish
46. dangit '[rabbit fish]'

Note:

- bijud sa isda – fish eggs: caviar
- sanga is banned
- tangkig – dwarf anaconda (sea)

=== Freshwater fish ===
1. ibís – guppy
2. kasili
3. anga

=== Mollusks (Shellfish) ===
==== Univalves ====
1. Saáng
2. Chambered Nautilus
3. bugyong
4. buskay – cowry; Cypraea; varieties: tiger cowry; golden cowry
5. cones – Conus

==== Bivalves ====
1. bebe
2. imbaw
3. tuway
4. aninikád
5. dawo-dawo
6. Amahóng or tahóng – green bay mussels Perna viridis (affected by tide)
7. litob – oyster; Crassostrea gigas
8. clams
9. giant clams
10. abalone
11. scallops

=== Sea animals ===
1. bóngcaras – sea cow
2. iho – shark
3. Whale shark; Rhincodon typus
4. lumód – Dolphin;
5. dugong – manatee; Dugong dugon
6. pawikan – sea turtle
7. pague – manta ray
8. bat or bat tulî – sea cucumber; Holothuria
9. lambay – big Crabs
10. kasag – small crabs
11. agukoy – fiddler crab; Uca sp.
12. pasayan – sapayan; also sapajan; shrimp
13. lukón – prawn
14. nukos – Squid;
15. amûpô – Octopus;
16. crabs – Genus Portunus
17. nipâ nipâ – crablets
18. sugâ sugâ – crablets
19. Lobster
20. Tangkigan
21. Taklâ- crayfish
22. Brittle stars; Ophiurida
23. Sand dollars
24. Starfish – A. typicus
25. tuyóm or tujóm – sea urchins; Diadema
26. swakê –
27. blue crab
28. mud crab
29. uwáng – Ustacidae, crayfish;
30. uwáng – Macrobrachium rosenbergii, giant freshwater prawn
31. sunlutan

=== Exotic species ===
1. Kuhól – golden apple snail; Ampullaria cuprina

== Gallery of Bohol Fauna ==
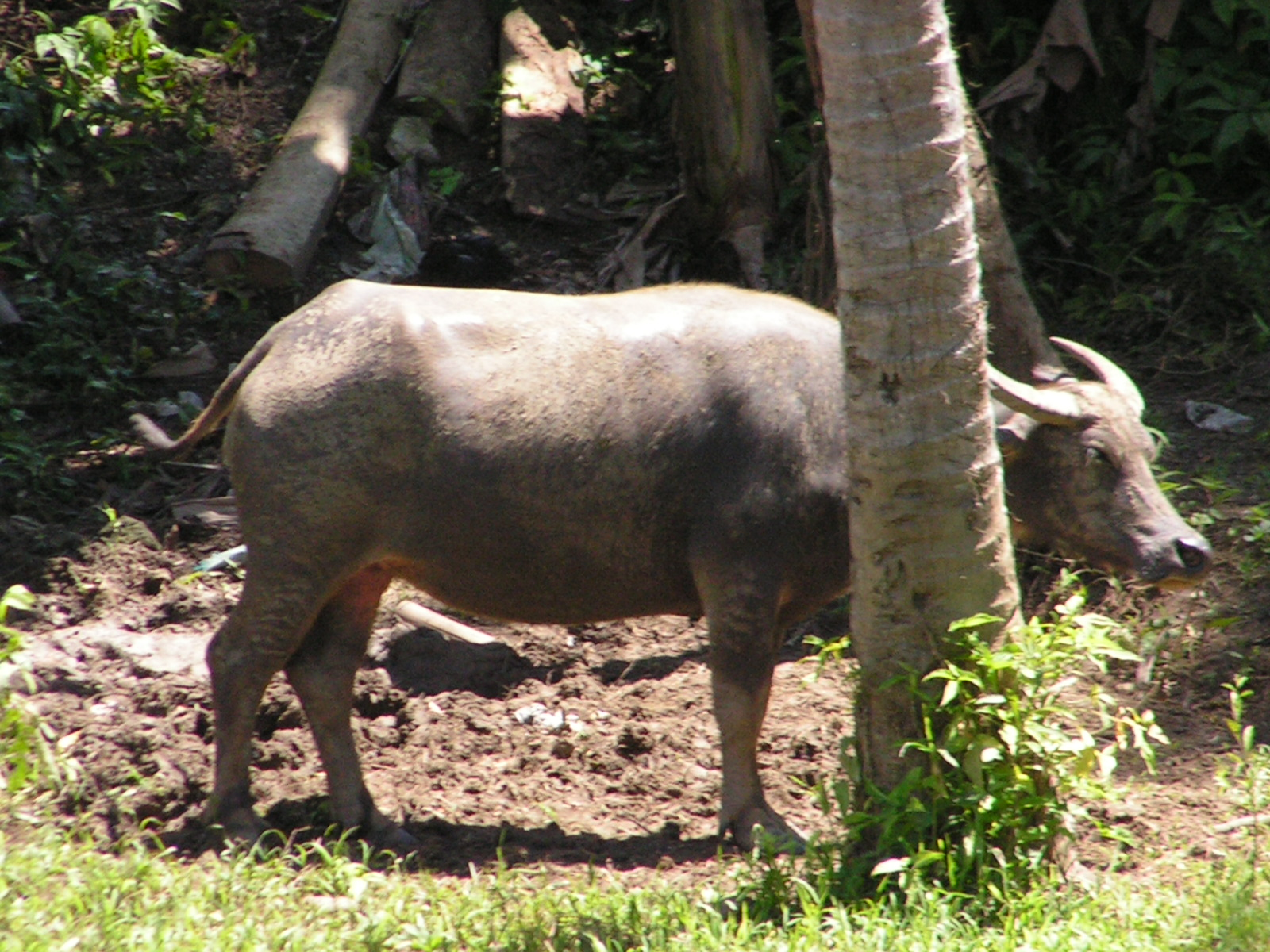
Philippine carabao (Bubalus bubalis;kalabaw in Tagalog; kabaw in Visayan languages)

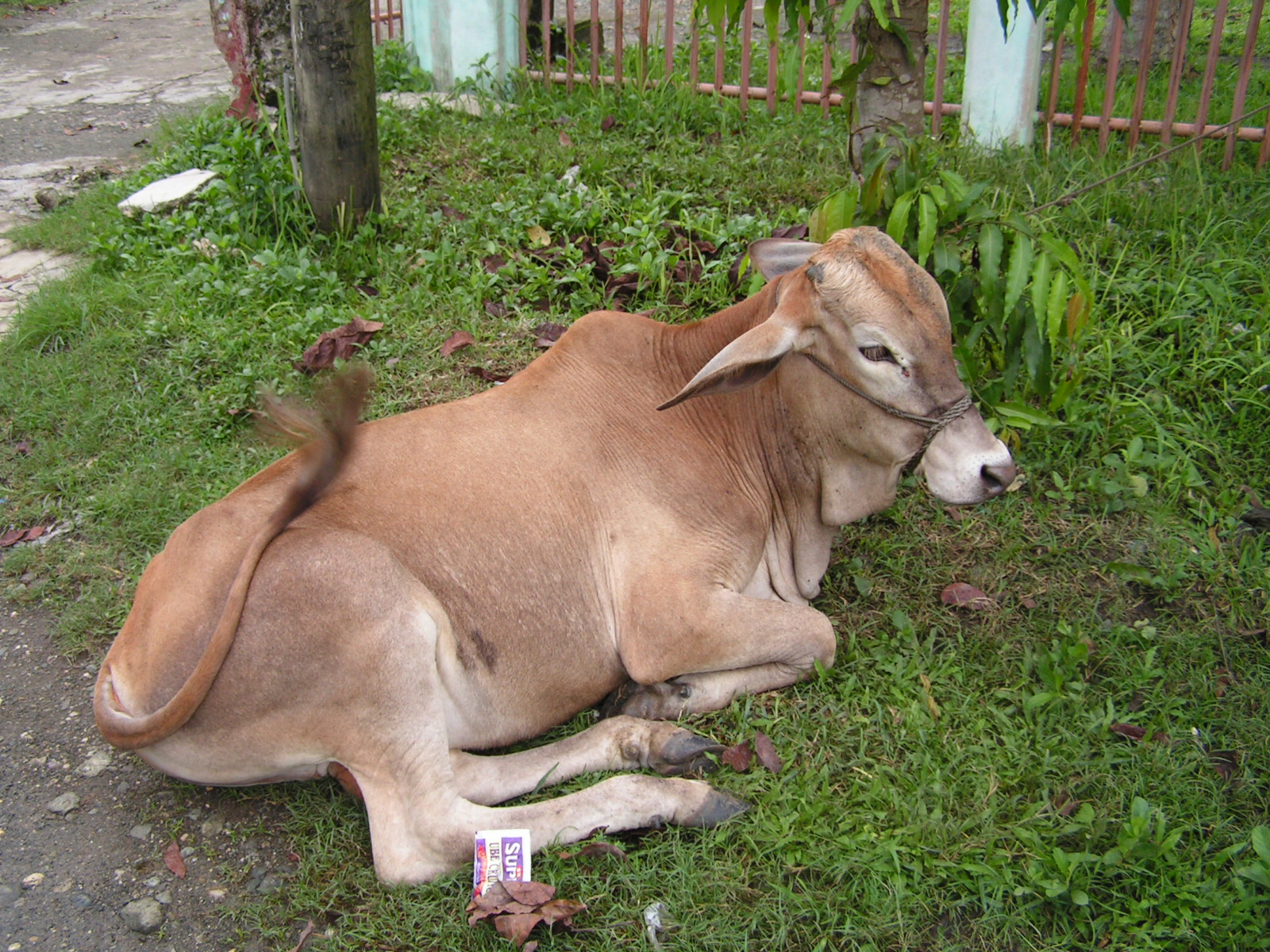
Philippine cow (Bos taurus; baka in Tagalog and Visayan)

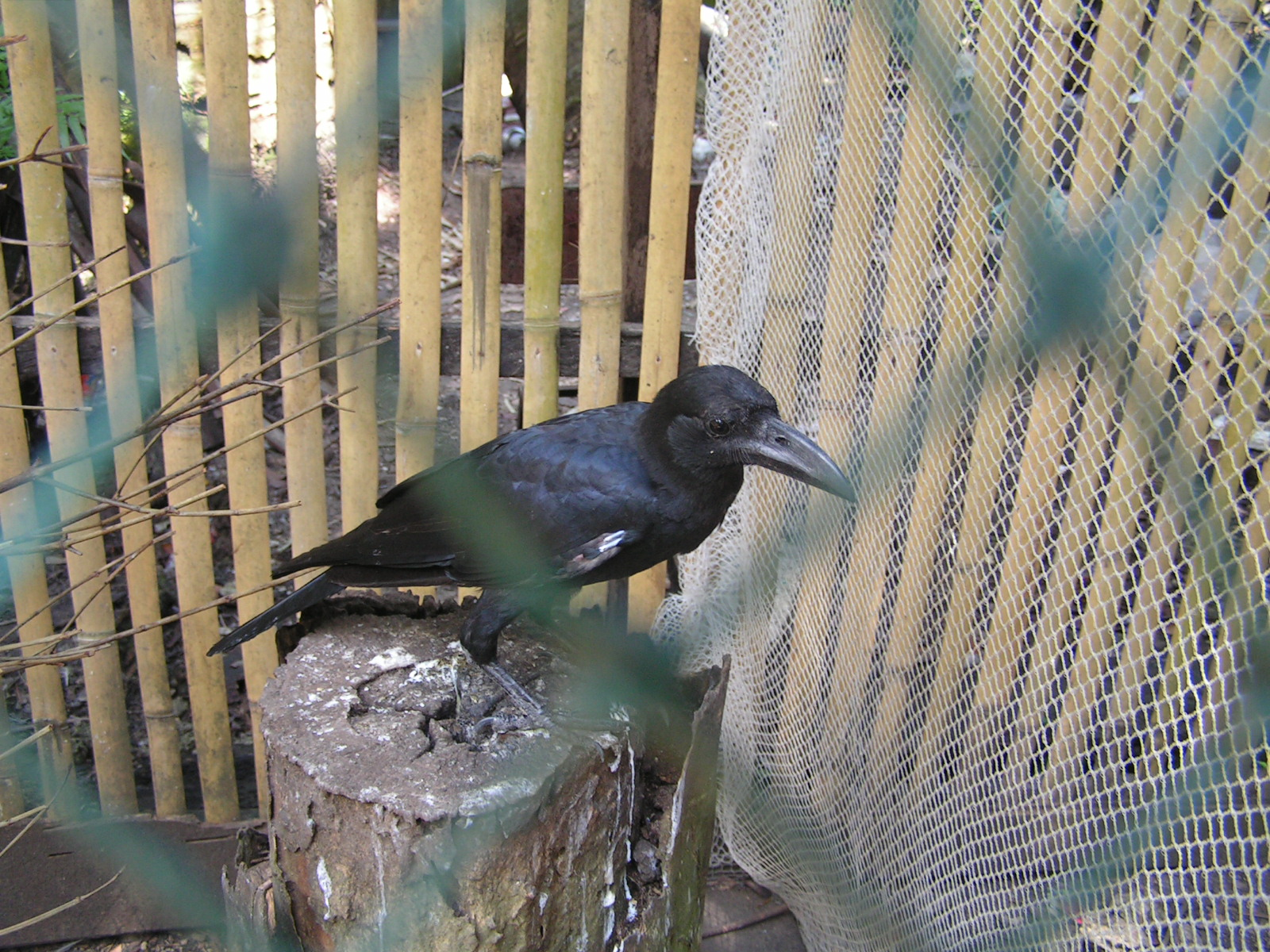
Philippine crow (Corone philippina; uwák the Visayan languages)

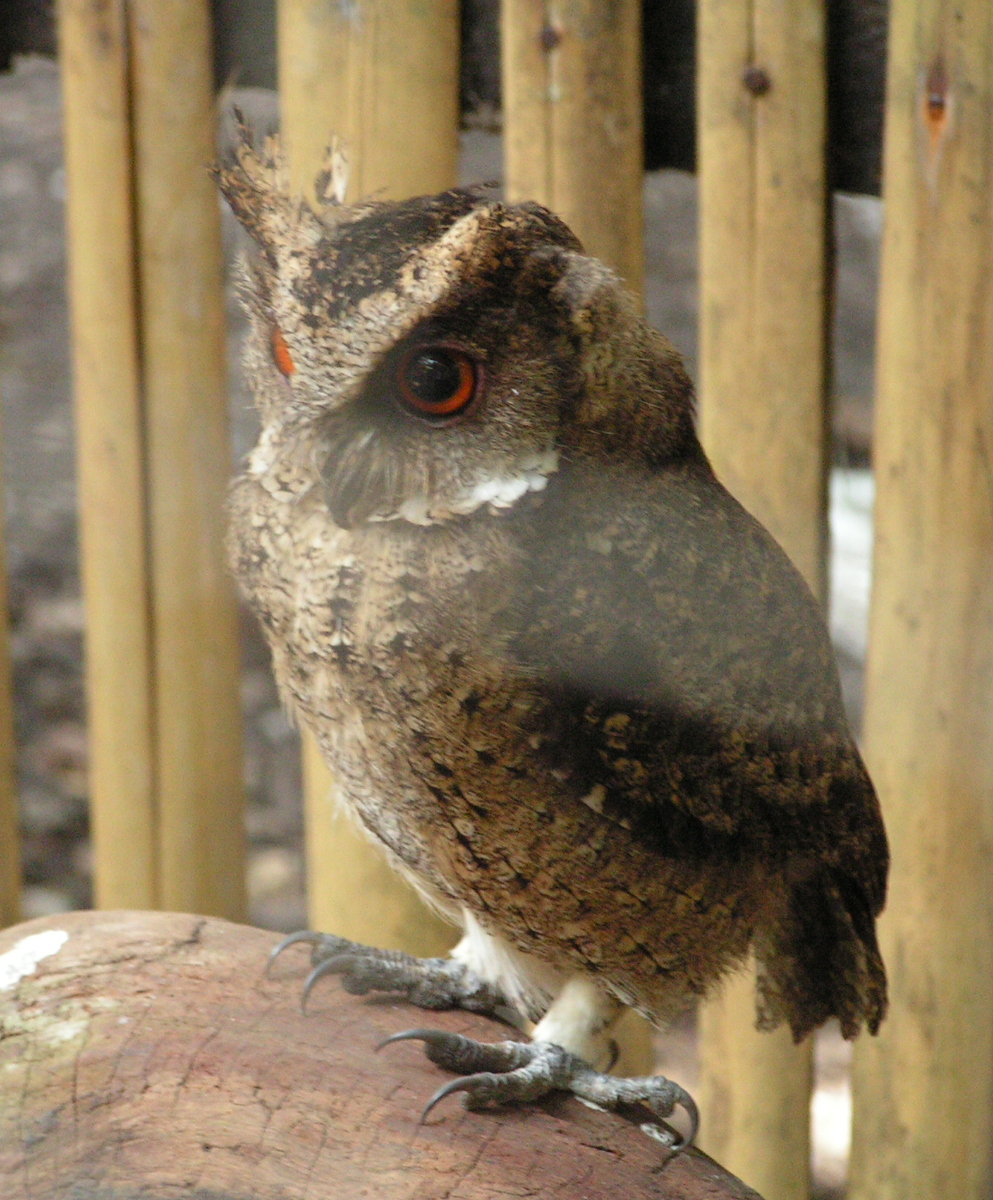
Philippine owl; Otus megalotis

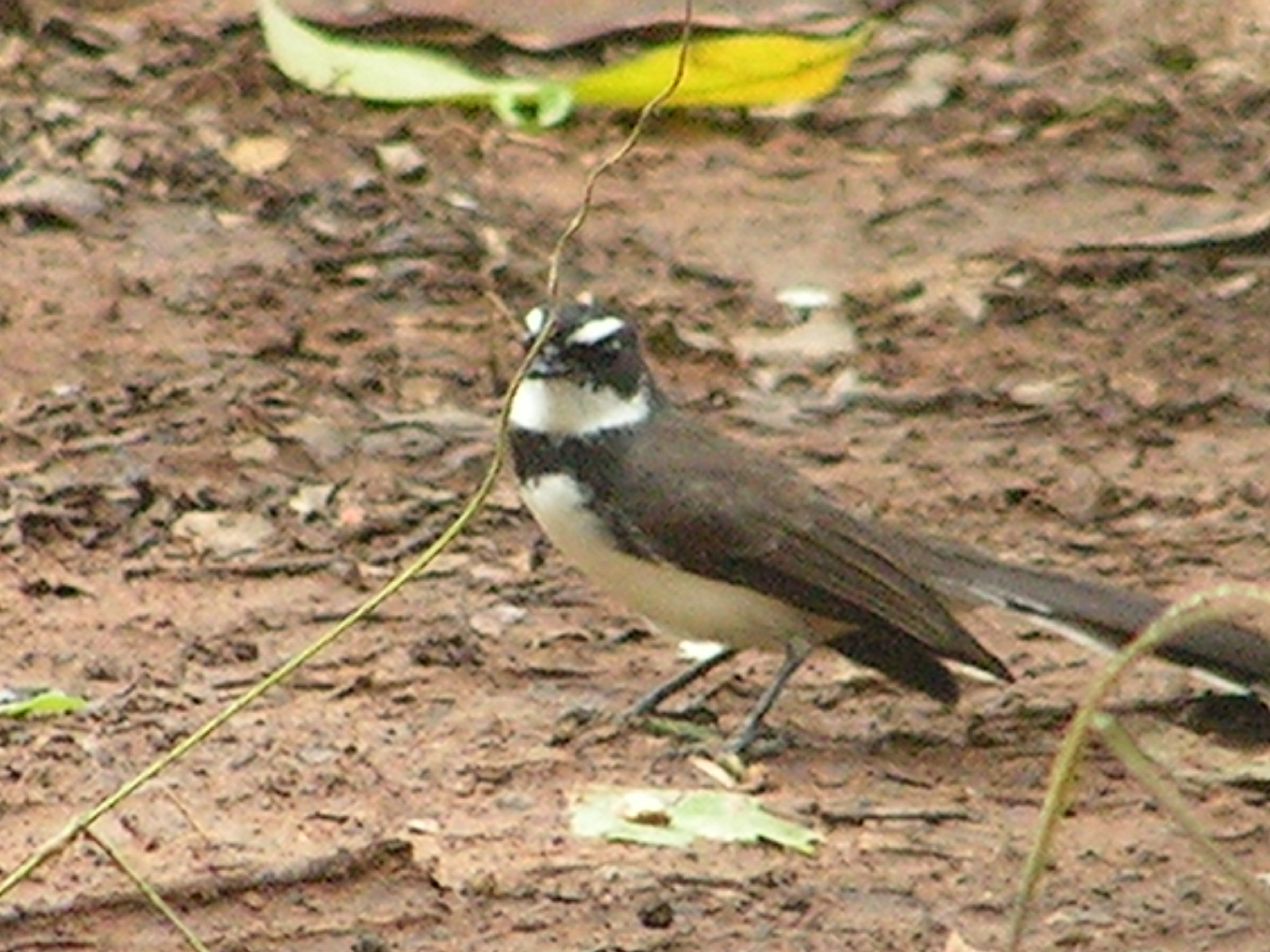
bird in Bohol, Philippines

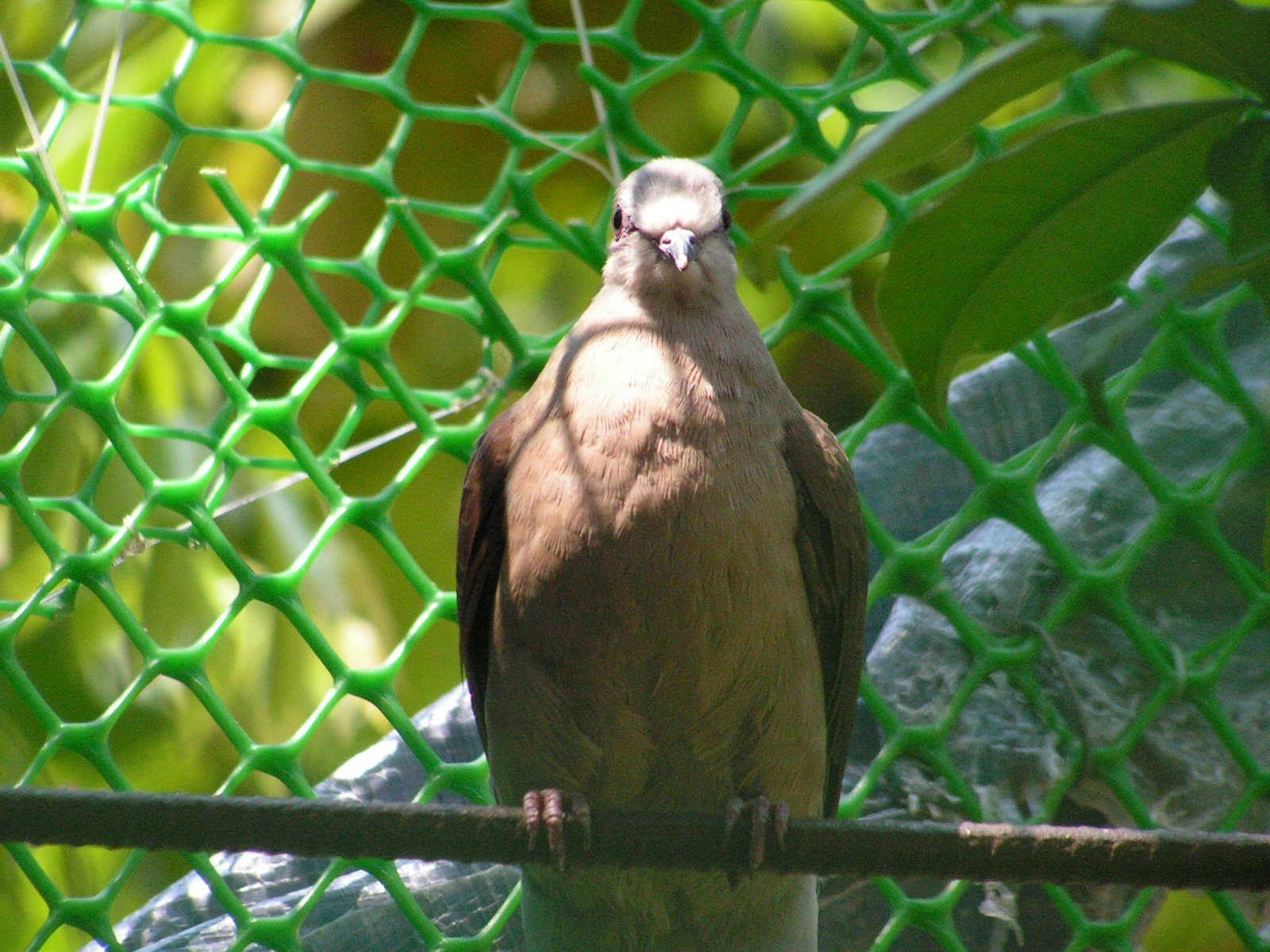
bird (tocmo) in Bohol, Philippines

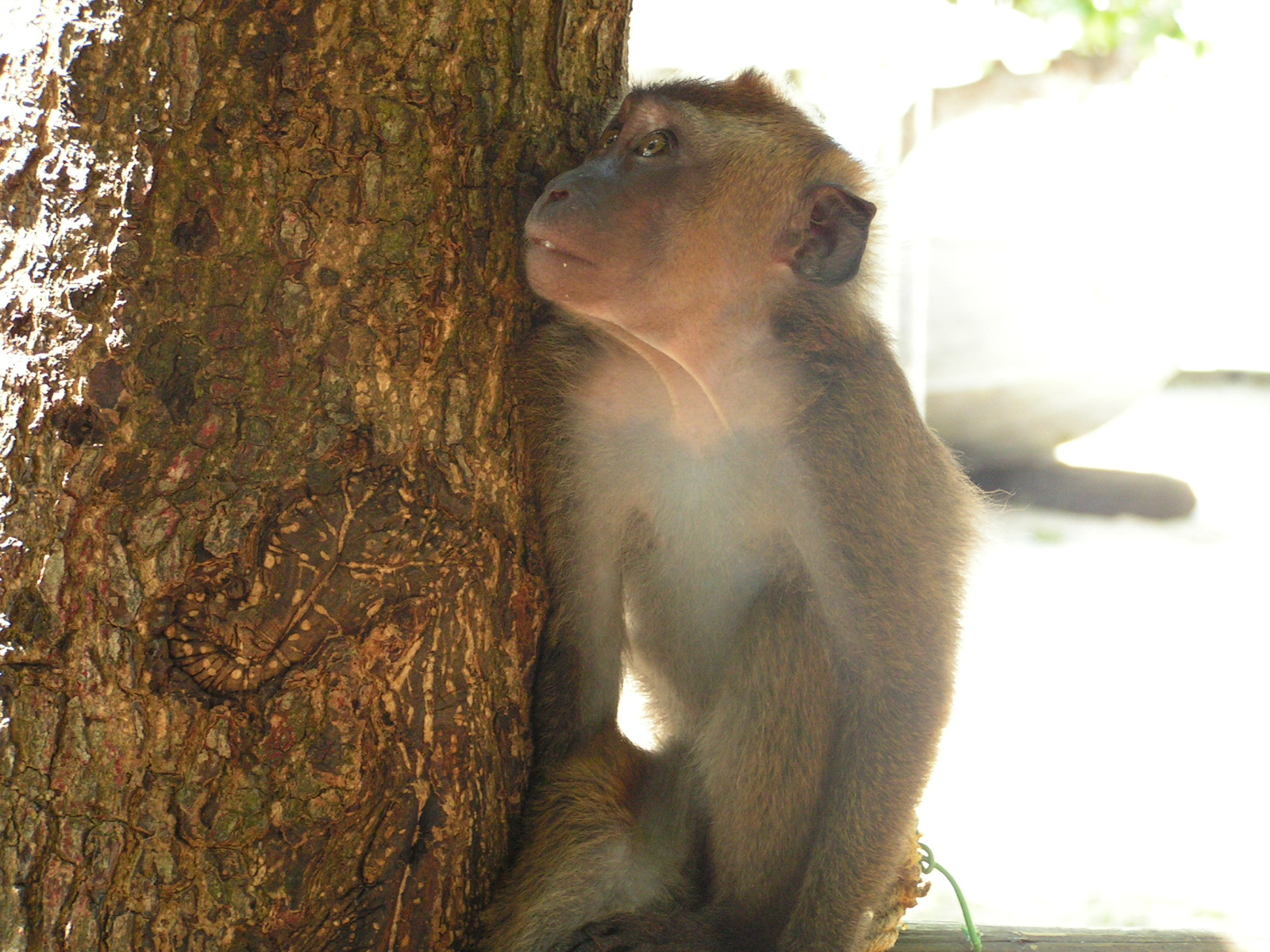
Philippine long-tailed macaque (Macaca fascicularis philippinensis; unggoy in the Visayan languages)

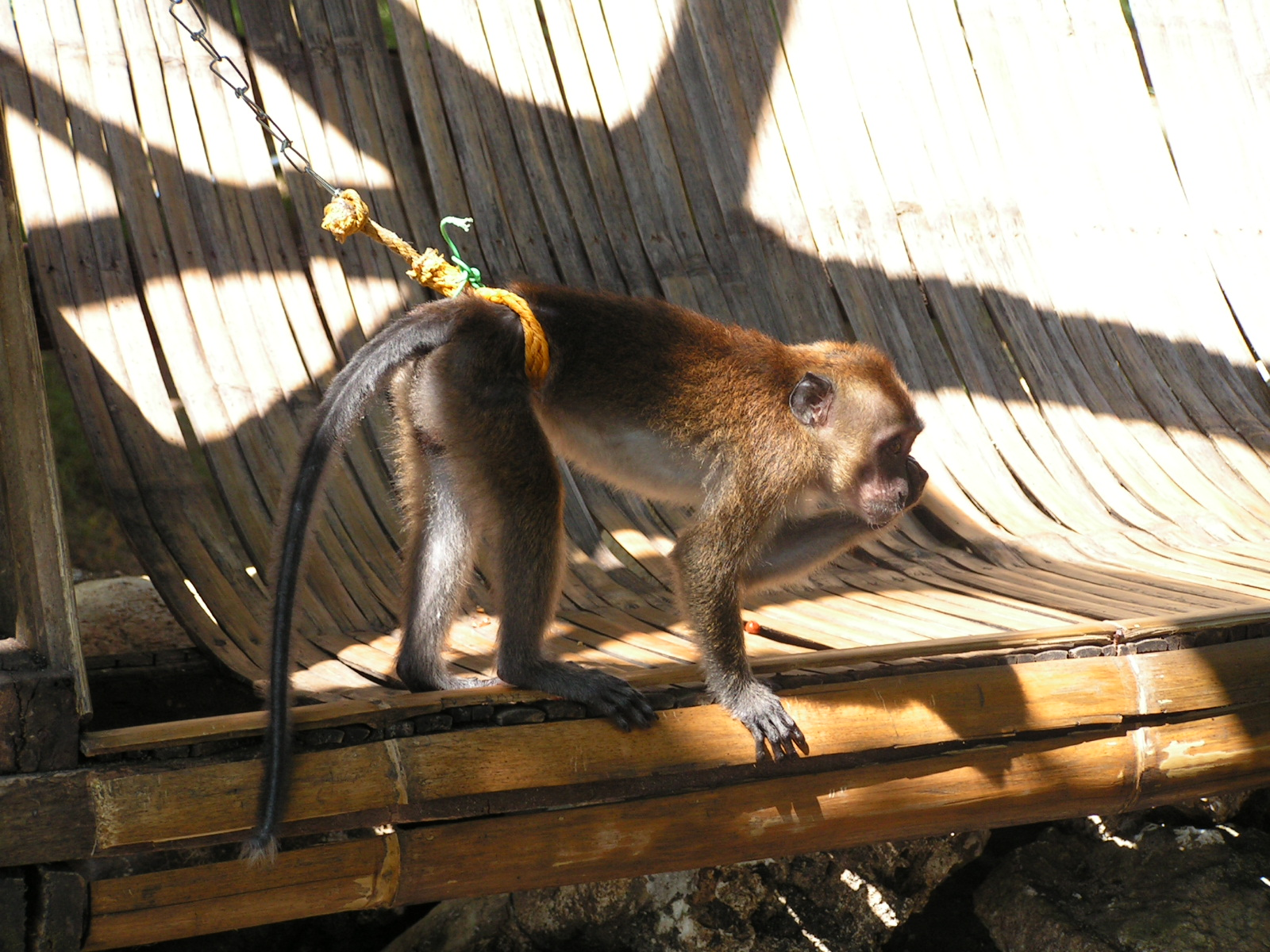
Philippine long-tailed macaque at Dumaluan Beach, Panglao, Bohol, Philippines

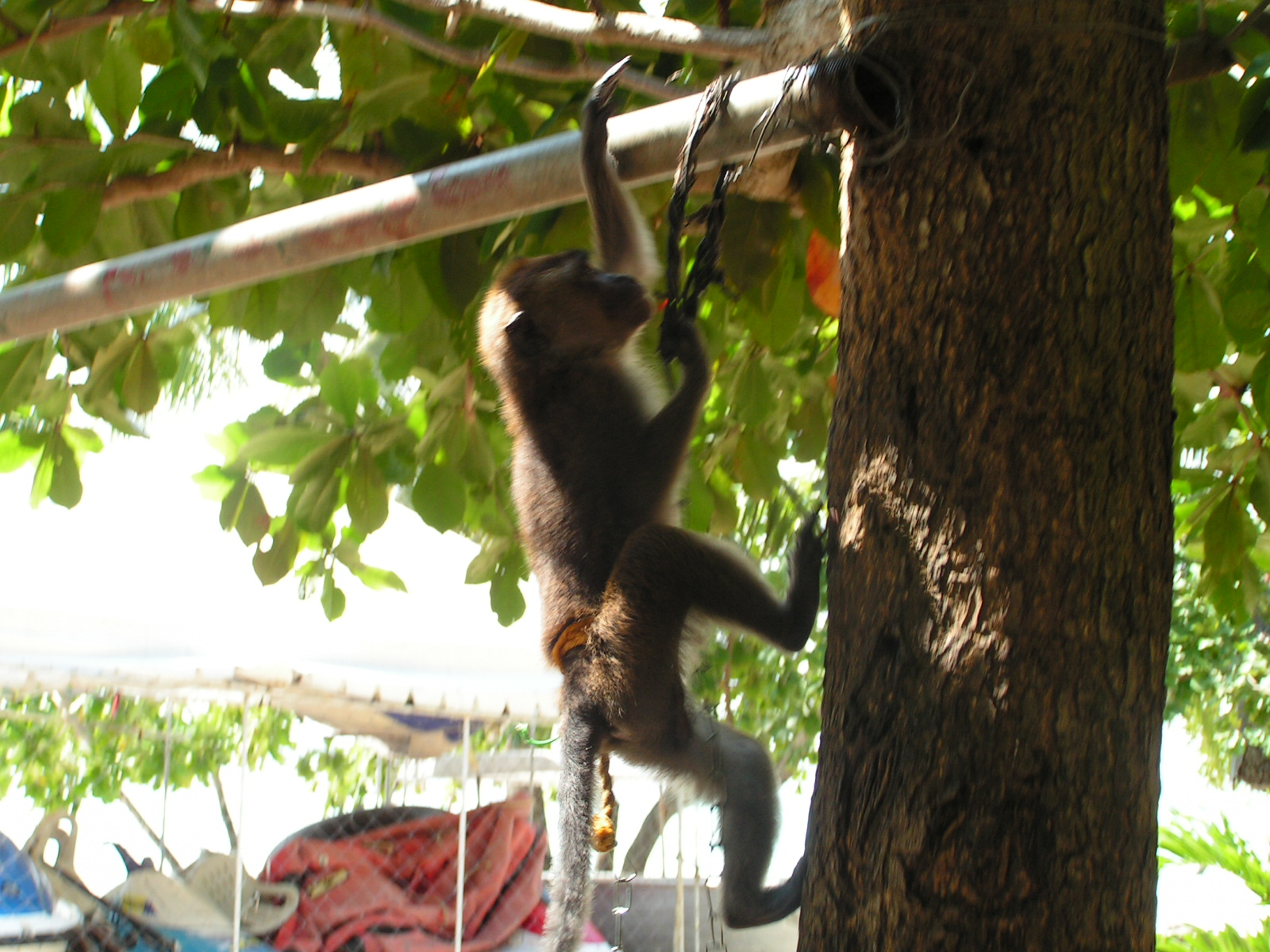
Philippine long-tailed macaque at Dumaluan beach, Panglao, Bohol, Philippines

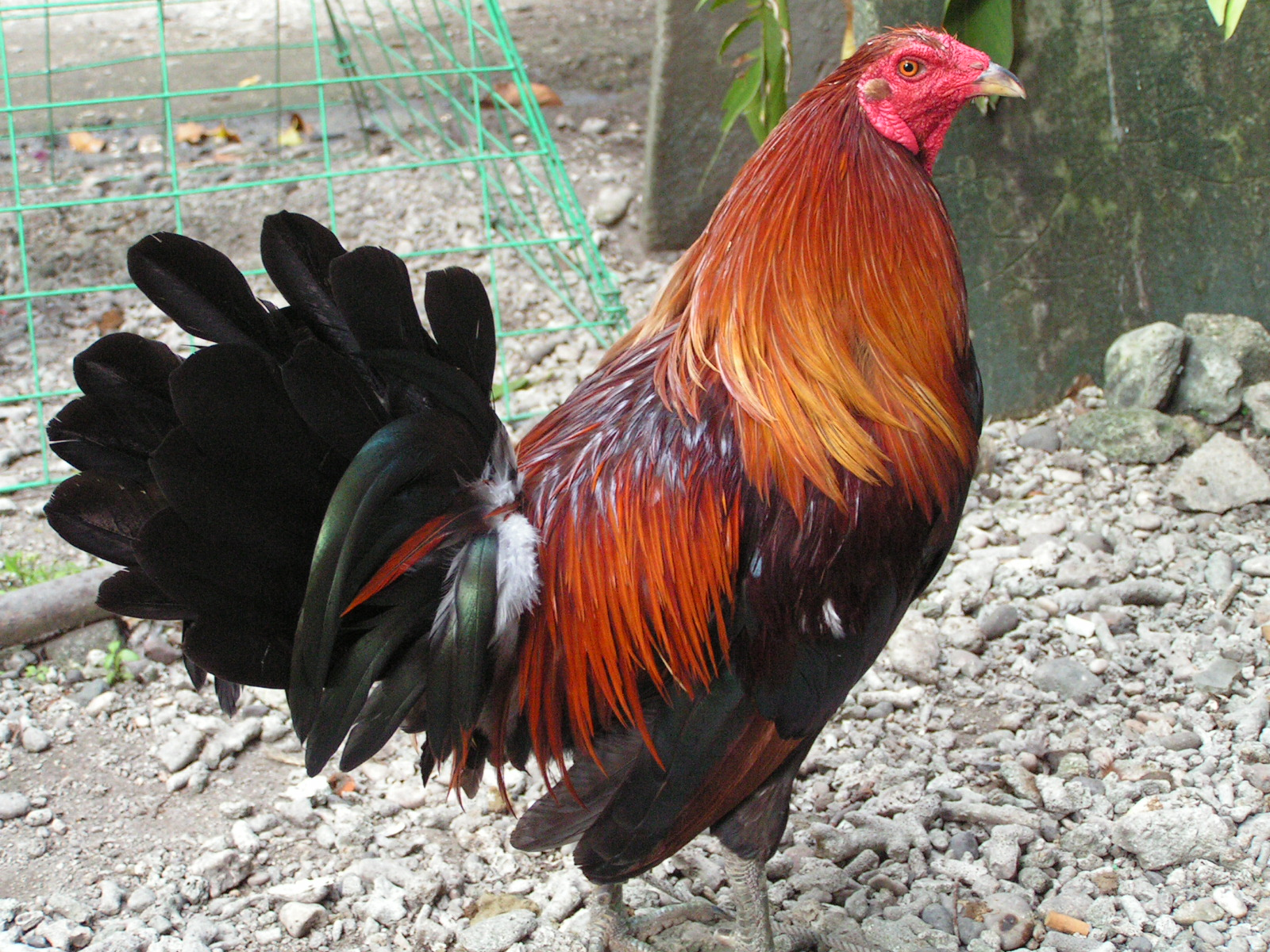
Philippine rooster (Gallus gallus; sunóy in the Visayan languages)

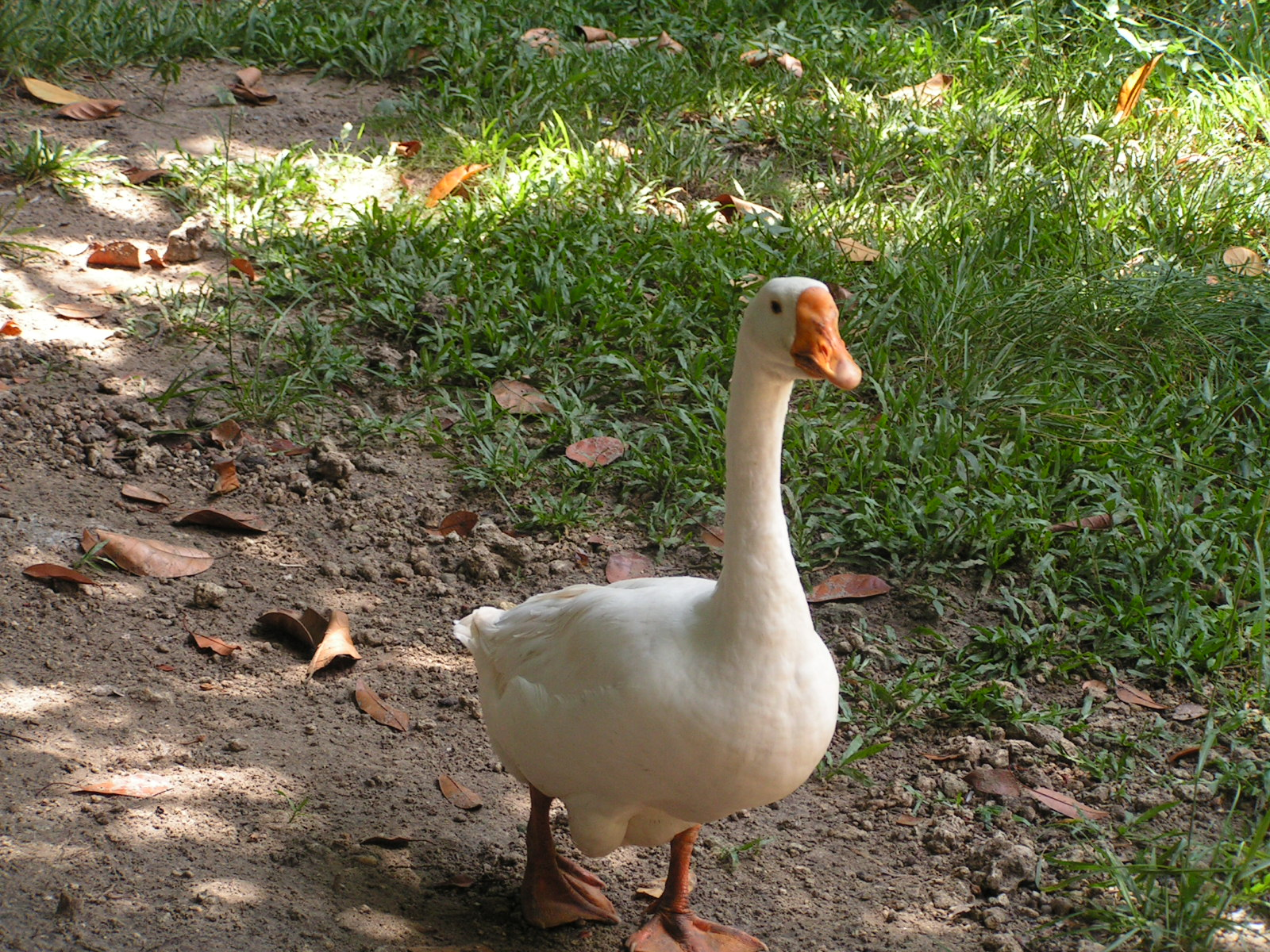
duck in Bohol, Philippines

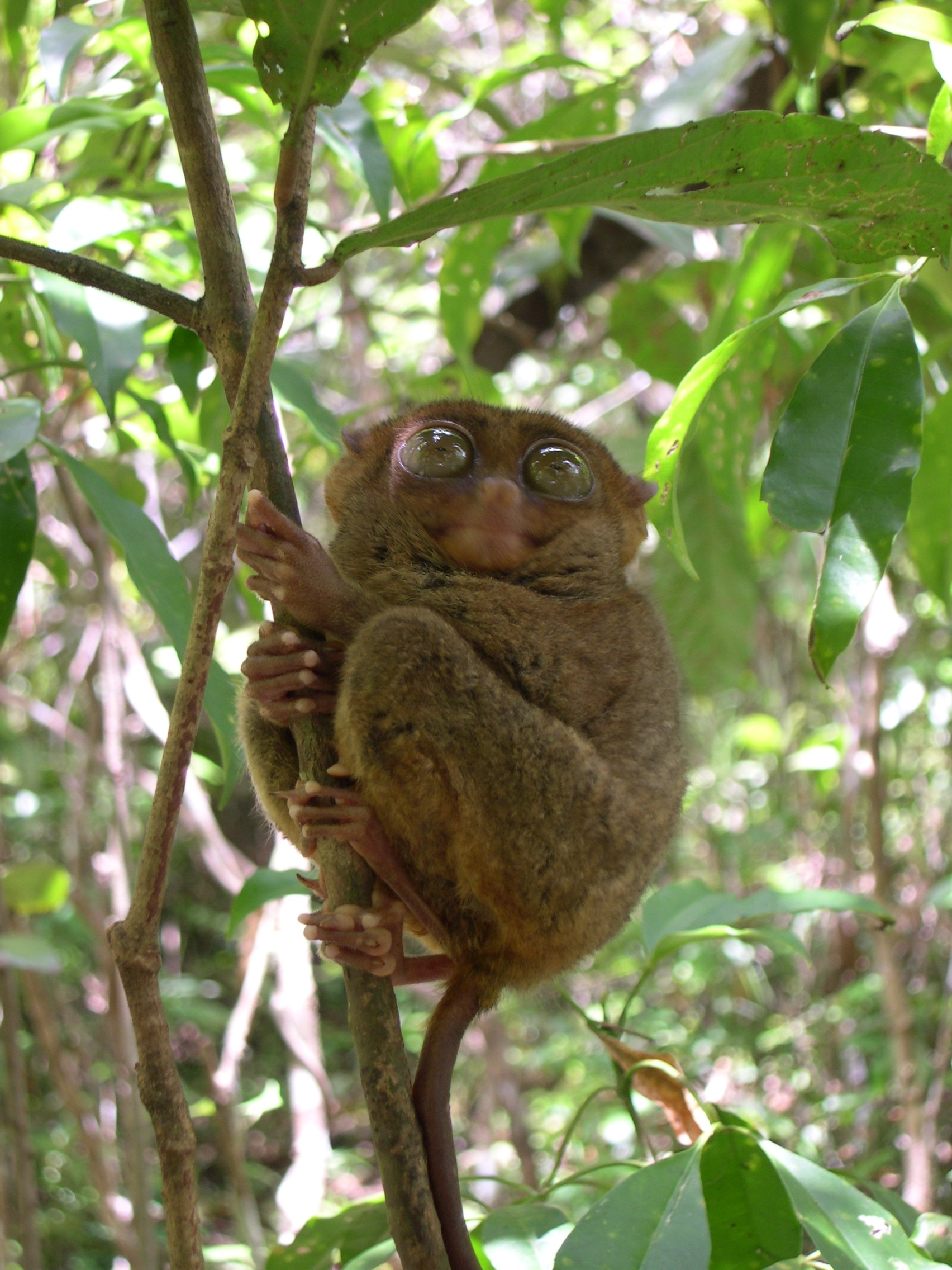
Philippine tarsier (Tarsius syrichta; mawmag or mamag in the Visayan languages)

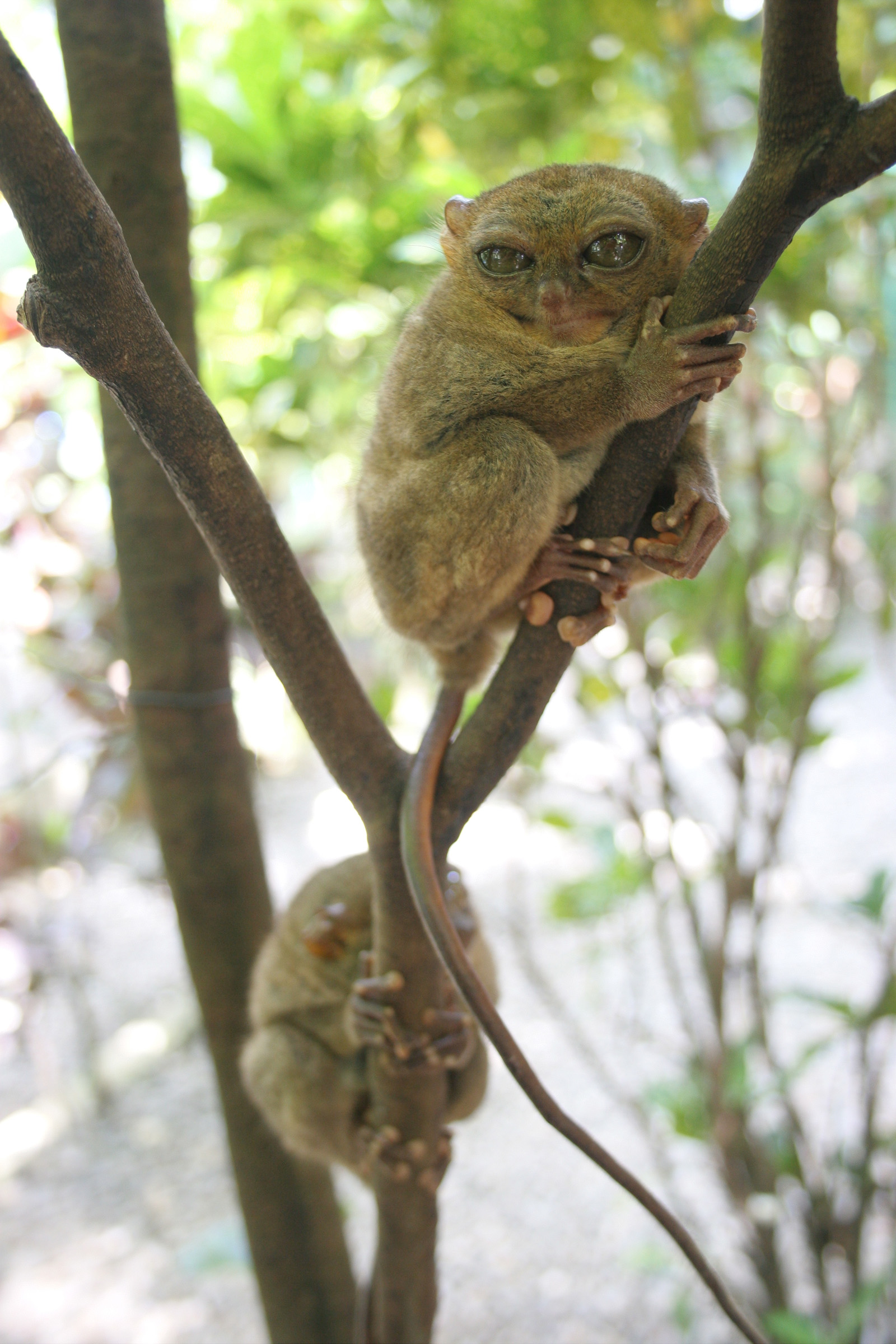
Philippine tarsier

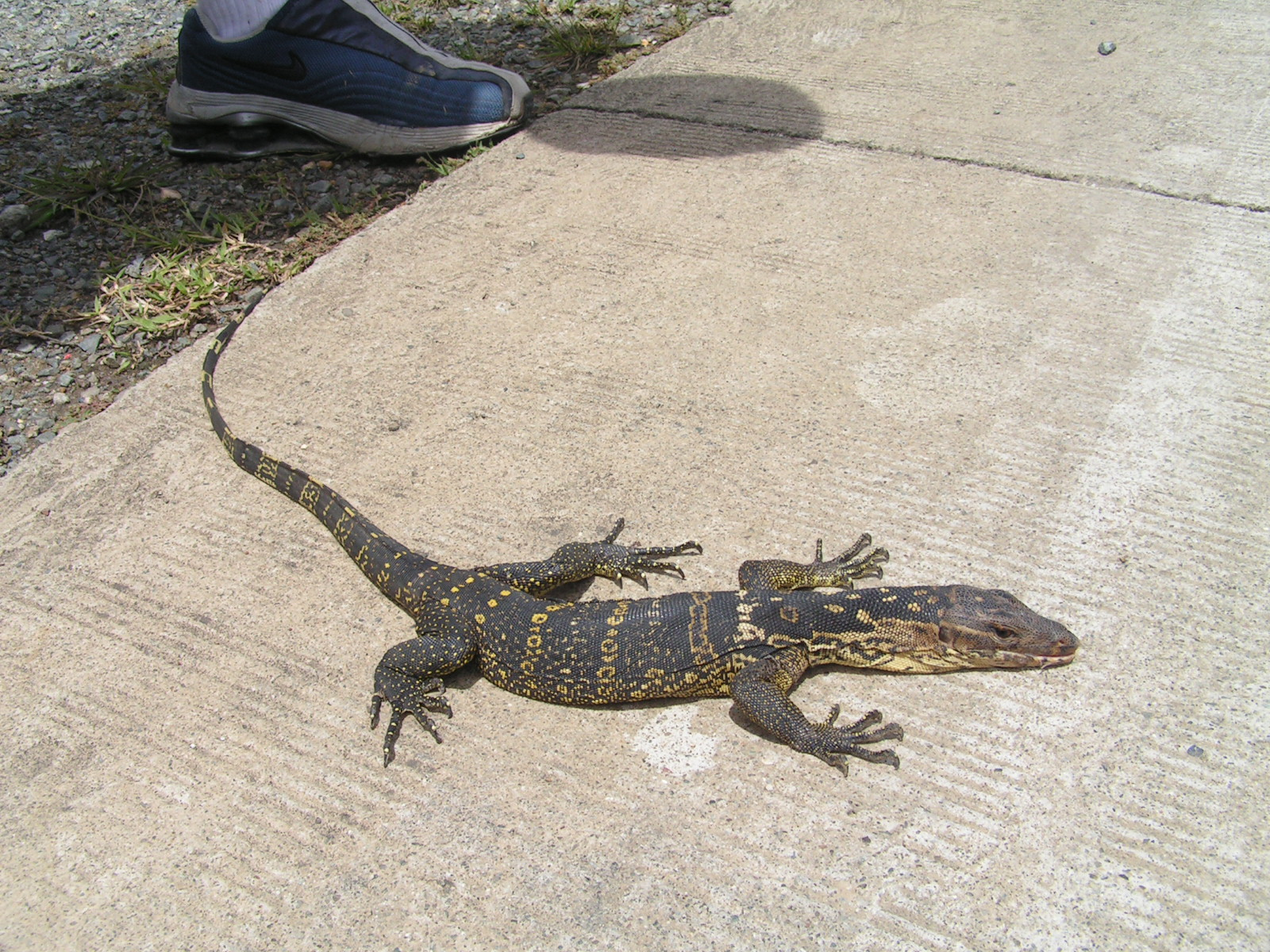
Monitor lizard (Varanus sp.;hawo in the Visayan languages)

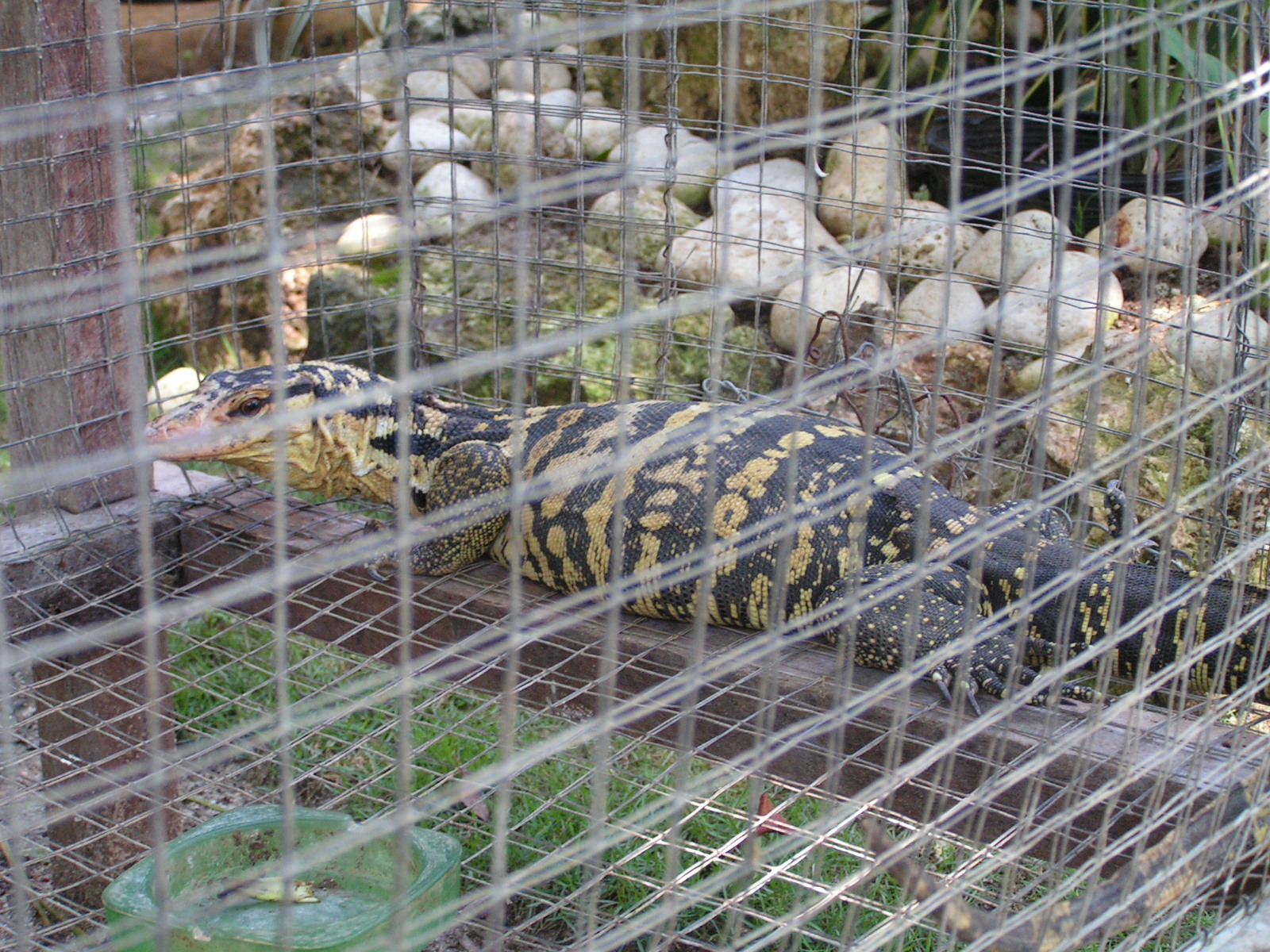
Monitor lizard (Varanus sp.;hawo in the Visayan languages)

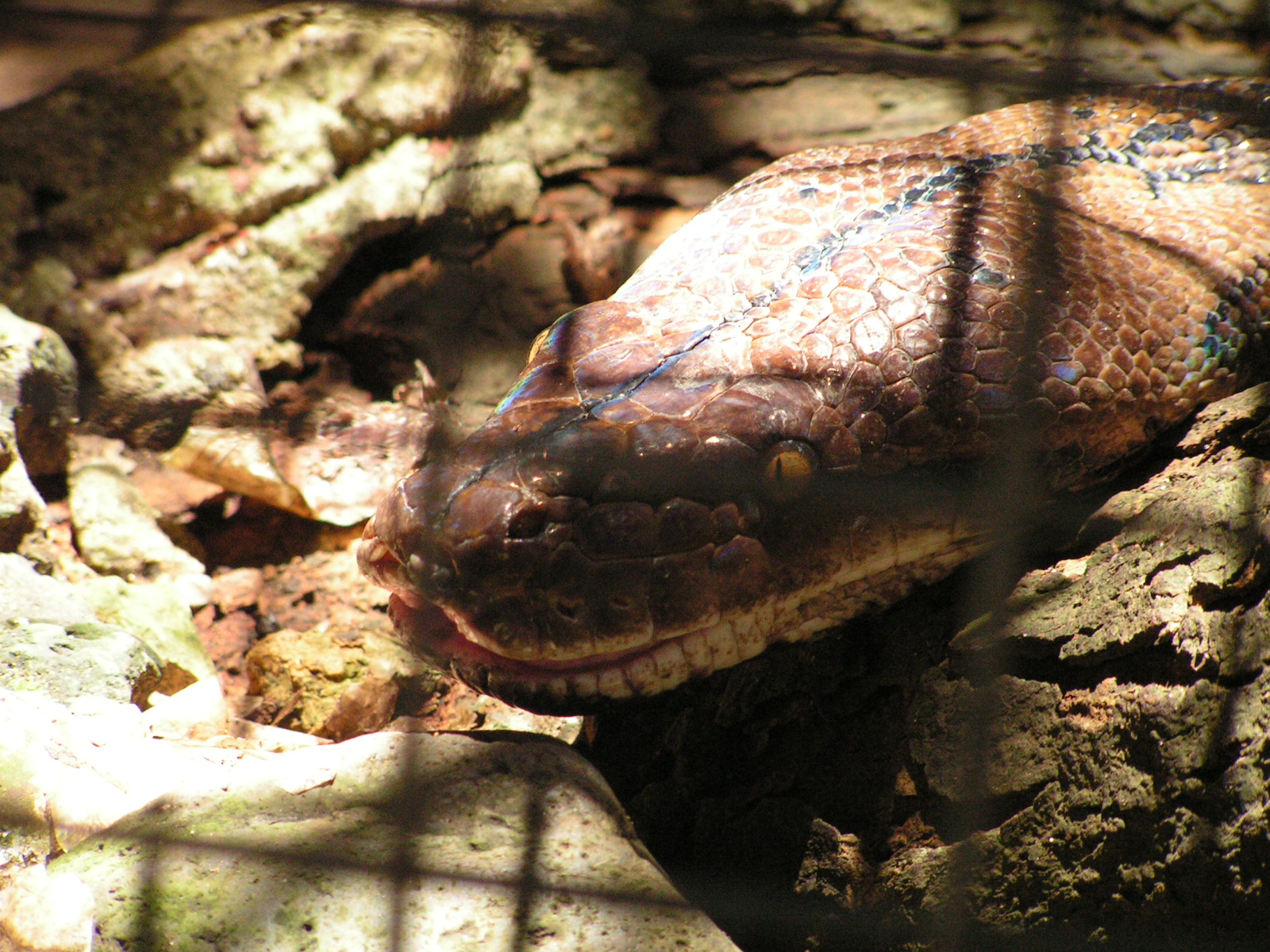
python in Bohol, Philippines (Python reticulatus)

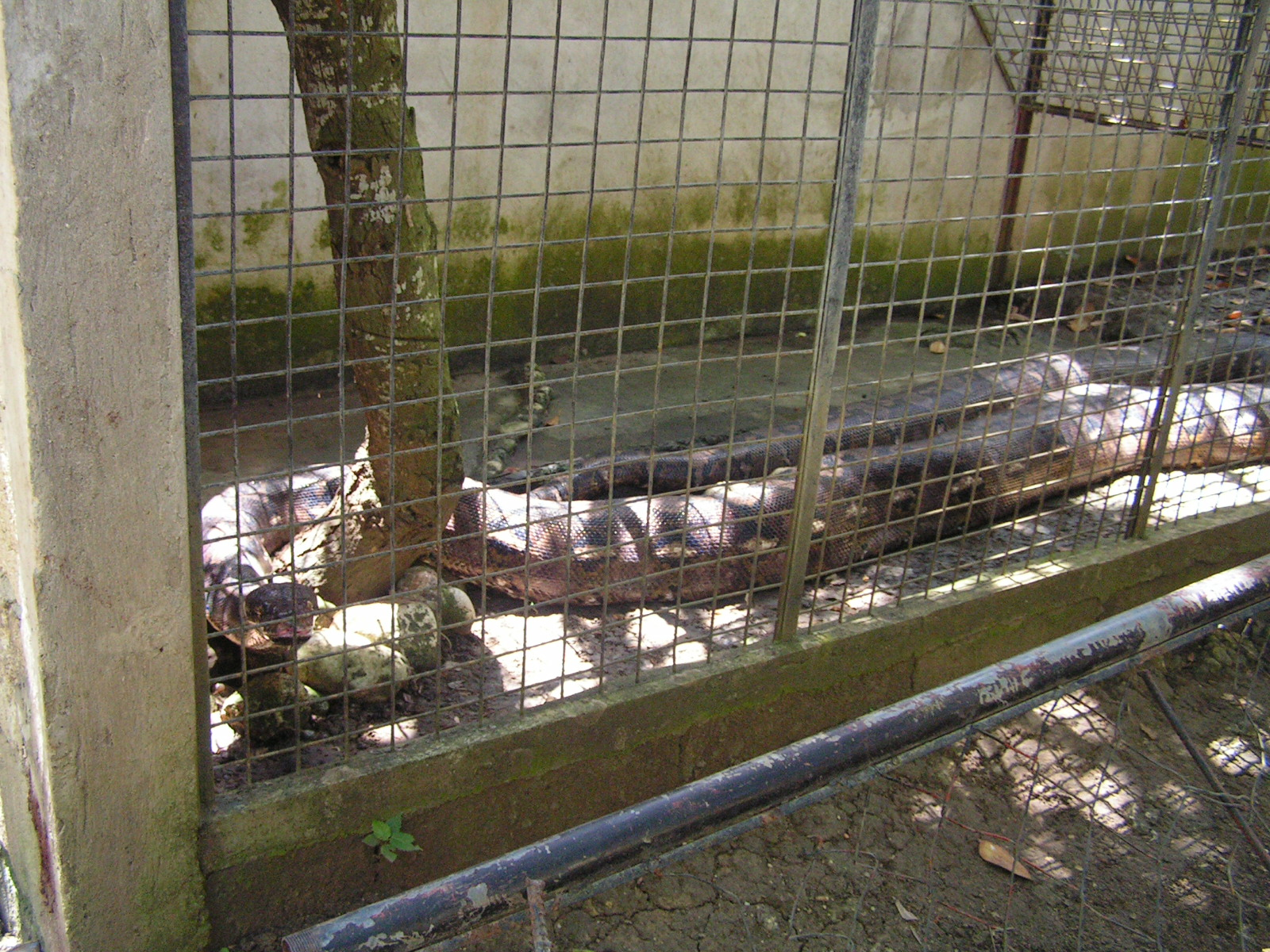
python in Bohol, Philippines (Python reticulatus)

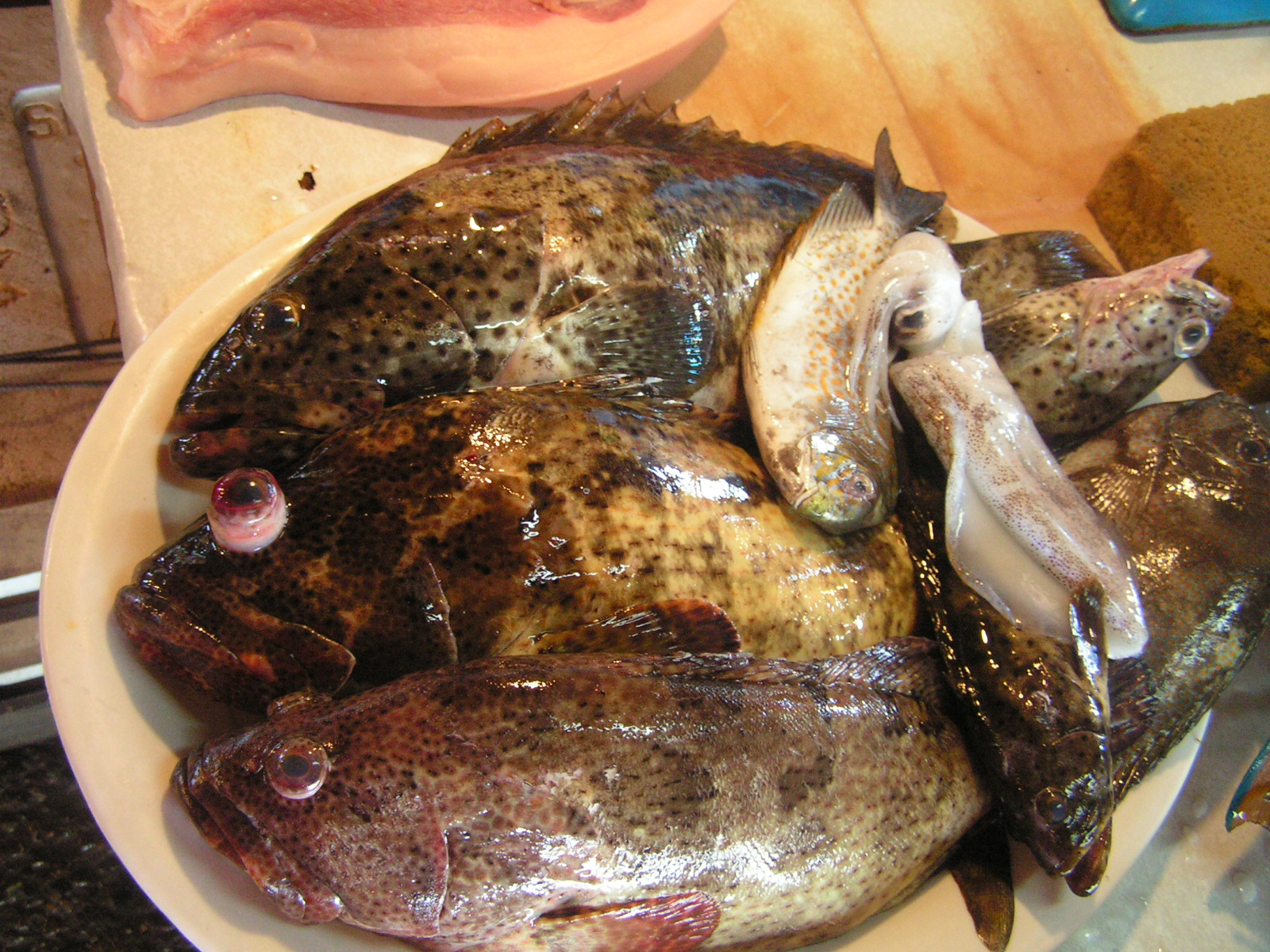
fish for sale at Ubay, Bohol Public Market

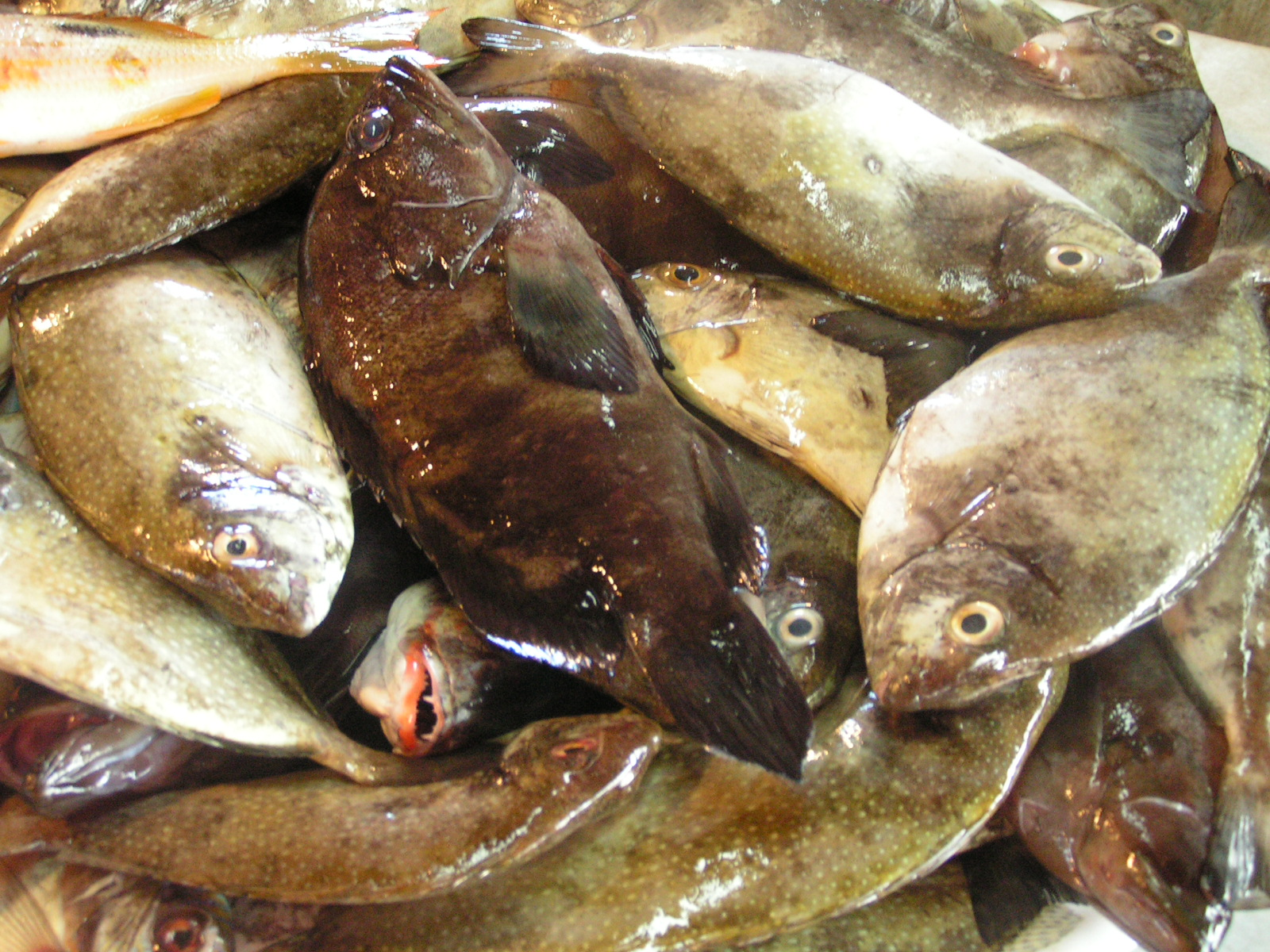
more fish at Ubay, Bohol Public Market

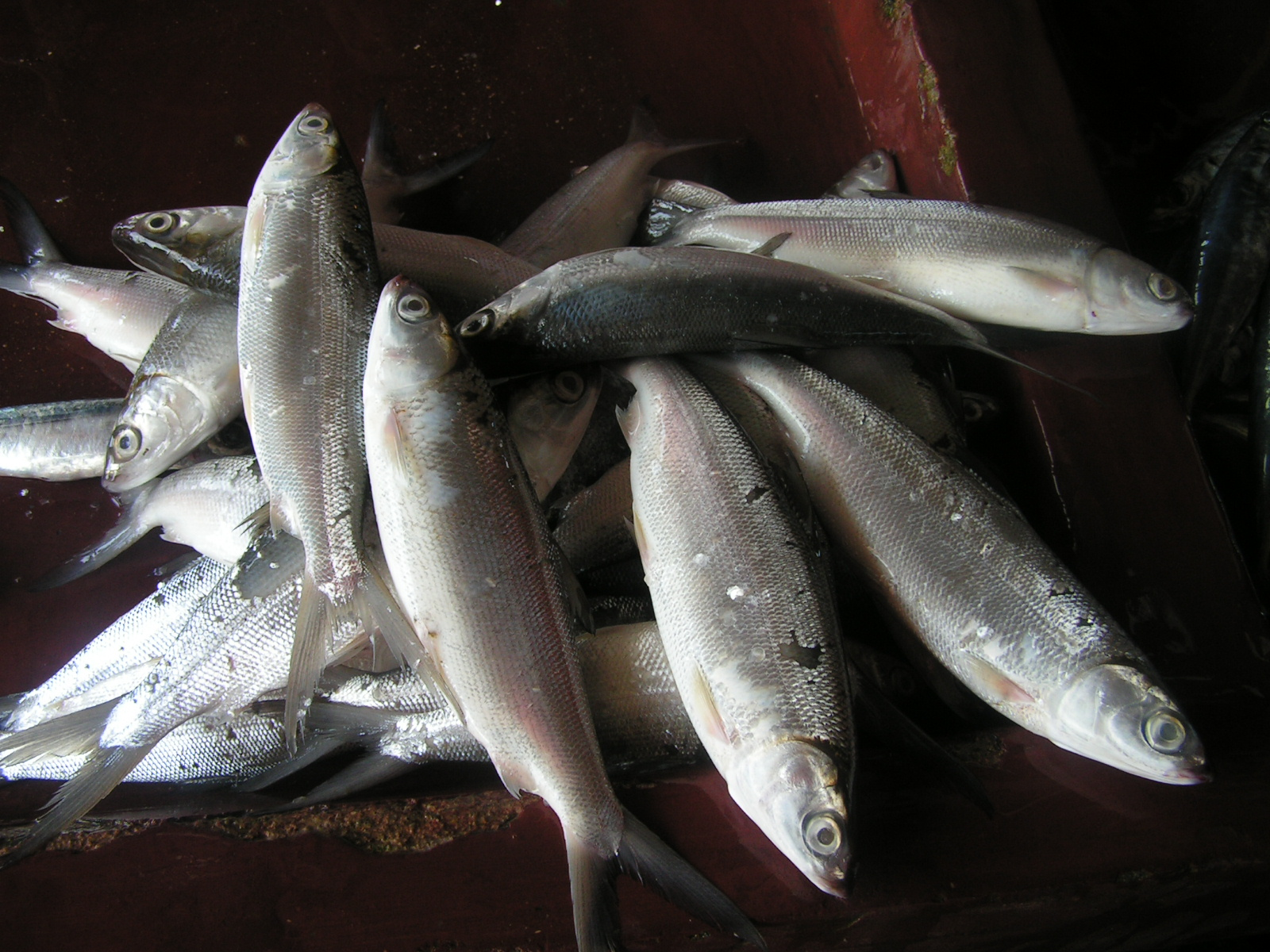
bangus or milkfish (Chanos chanos)

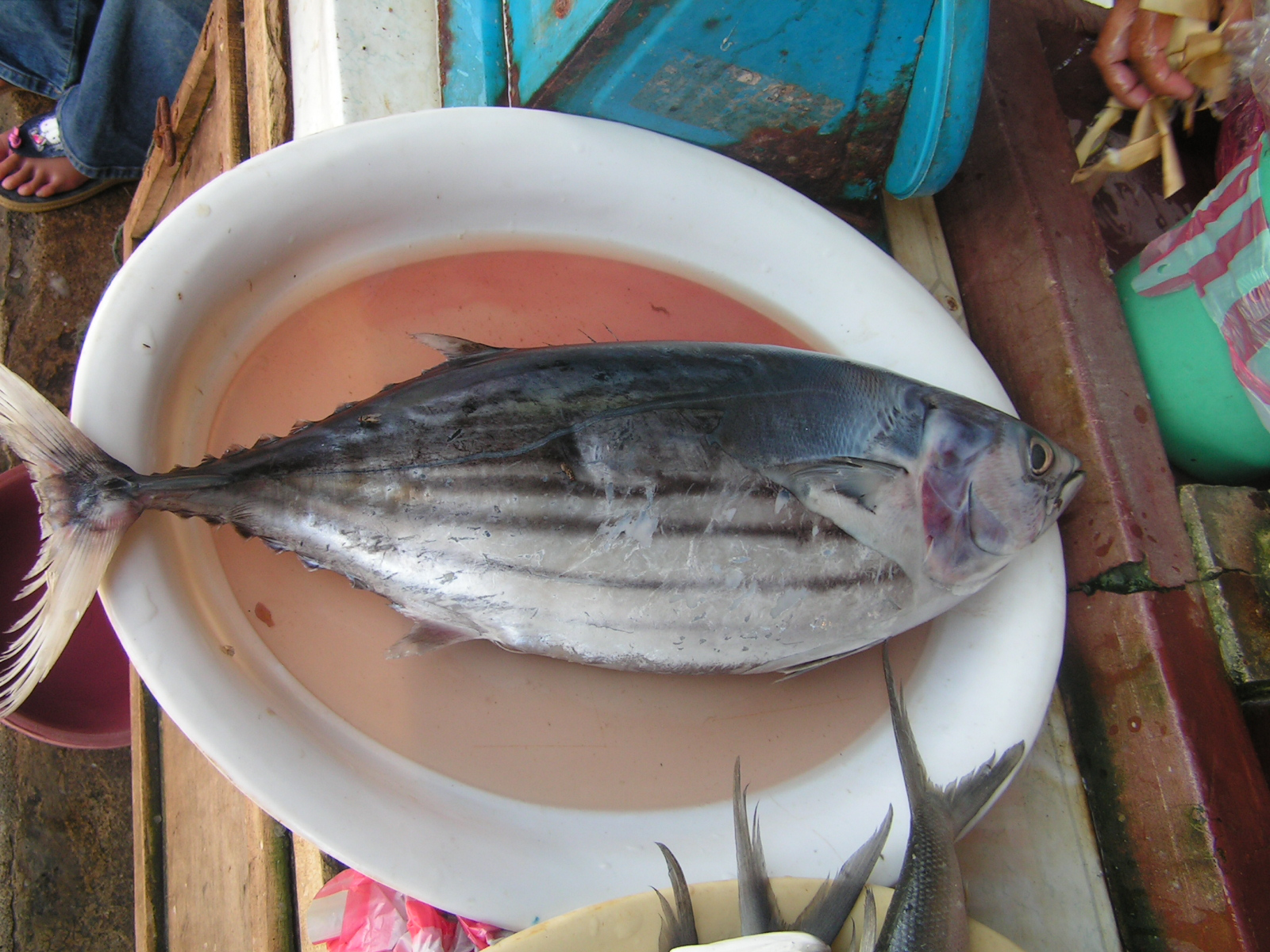
fish in Bohol, Philippines

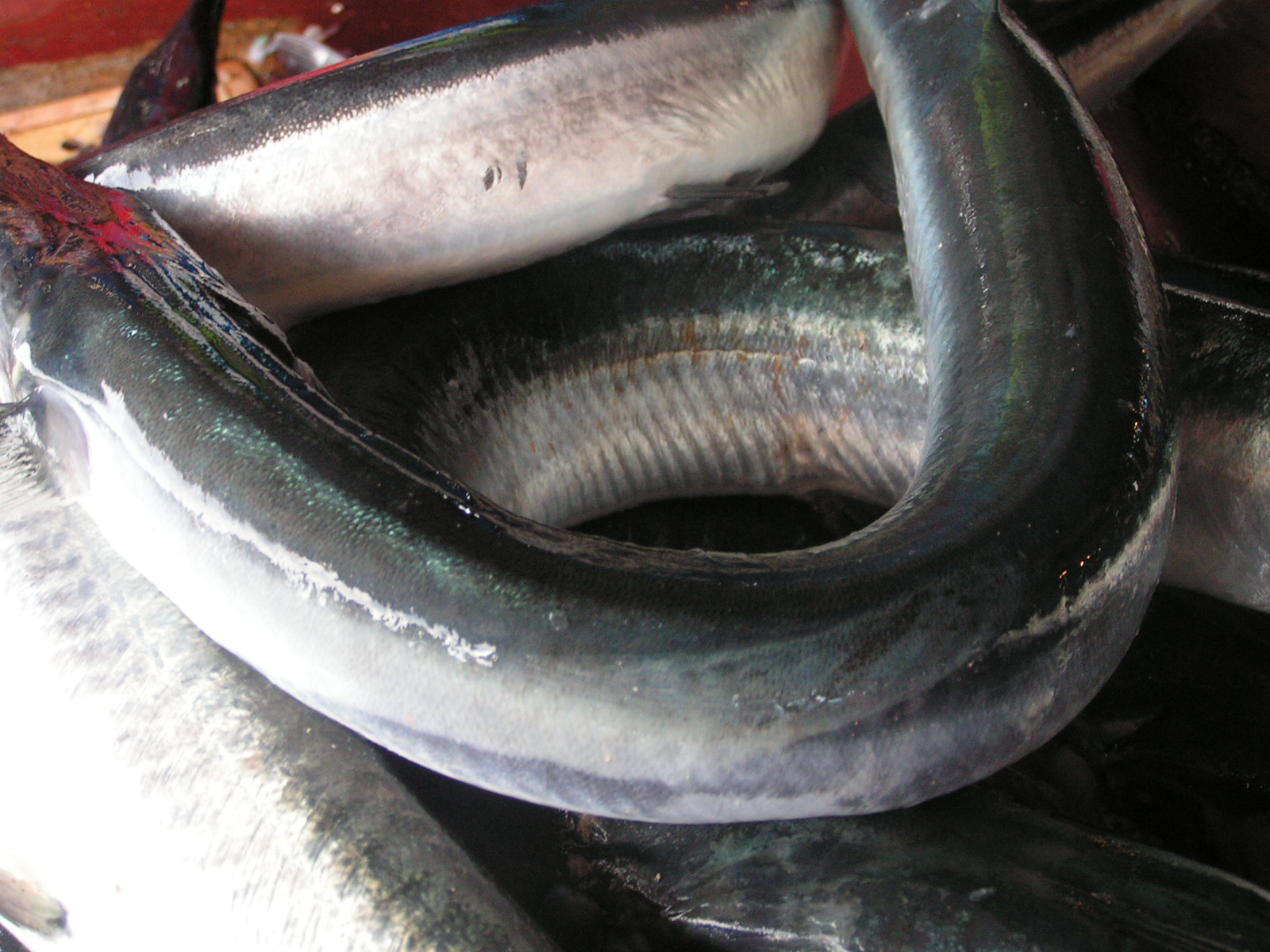
fish in Bohol, Philippines

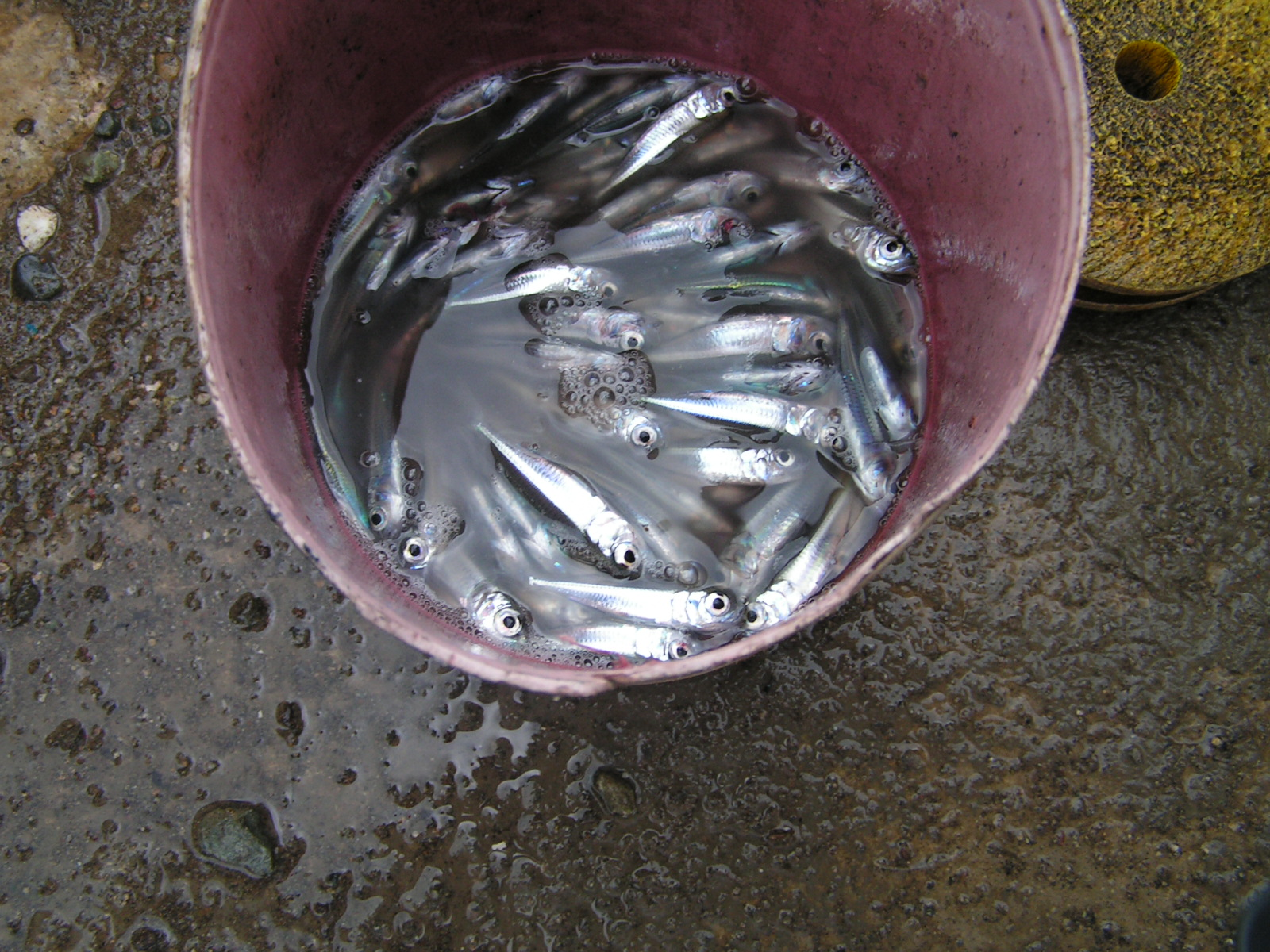
fish catch in Bohol, Philippines

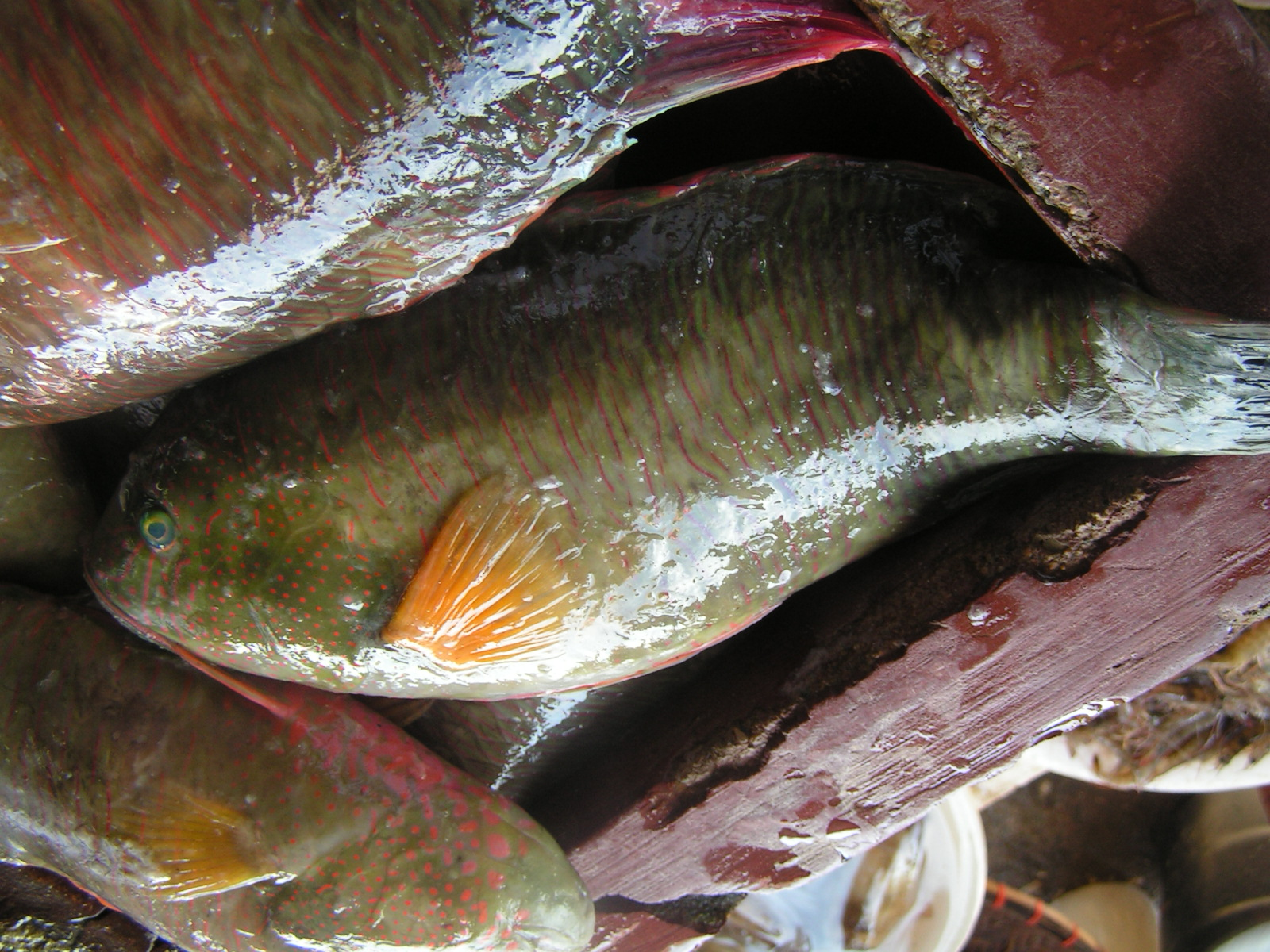
molmol fish in Bohol, Philippines

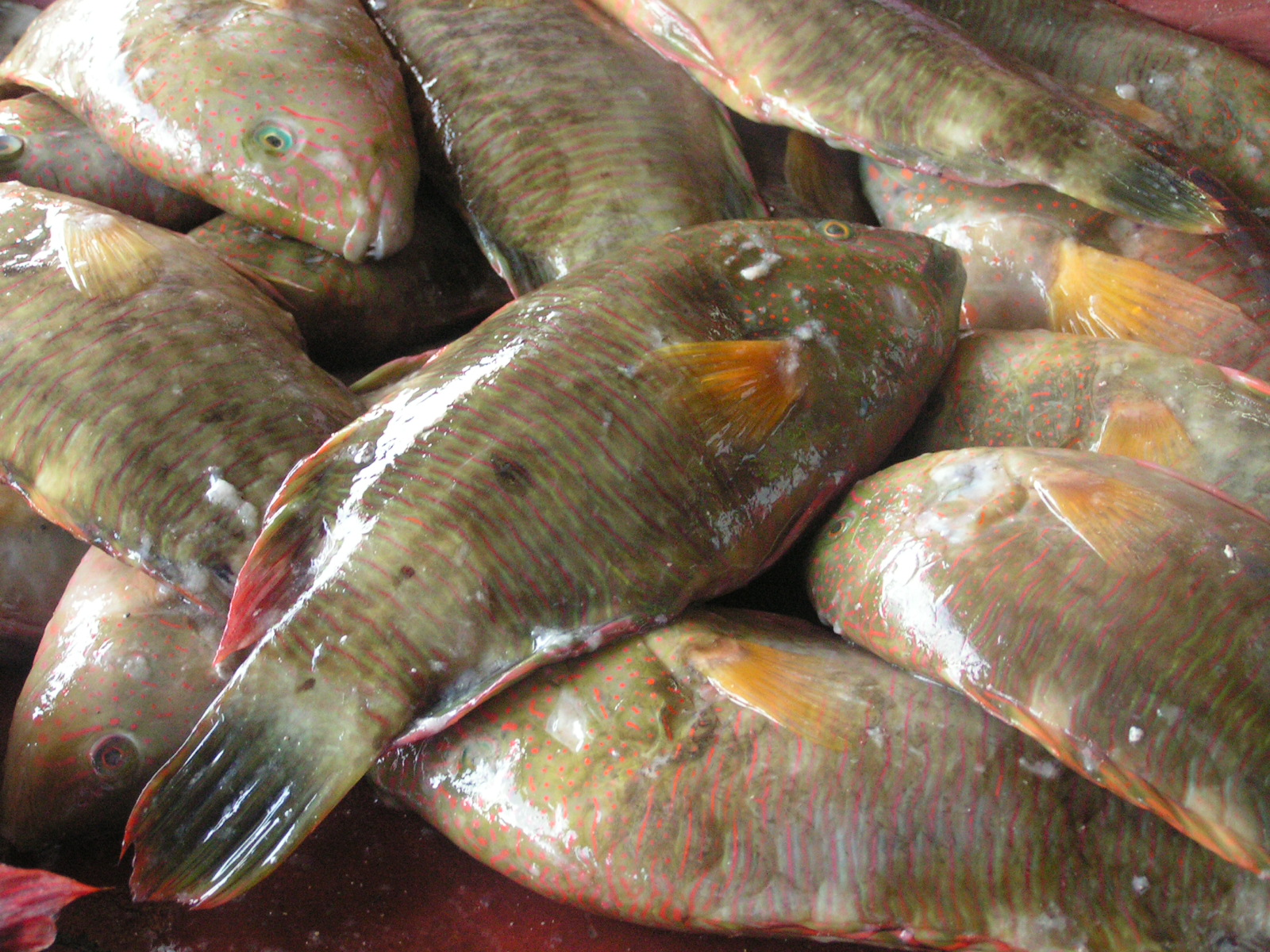
more molmol fish in Bohol, Philippines

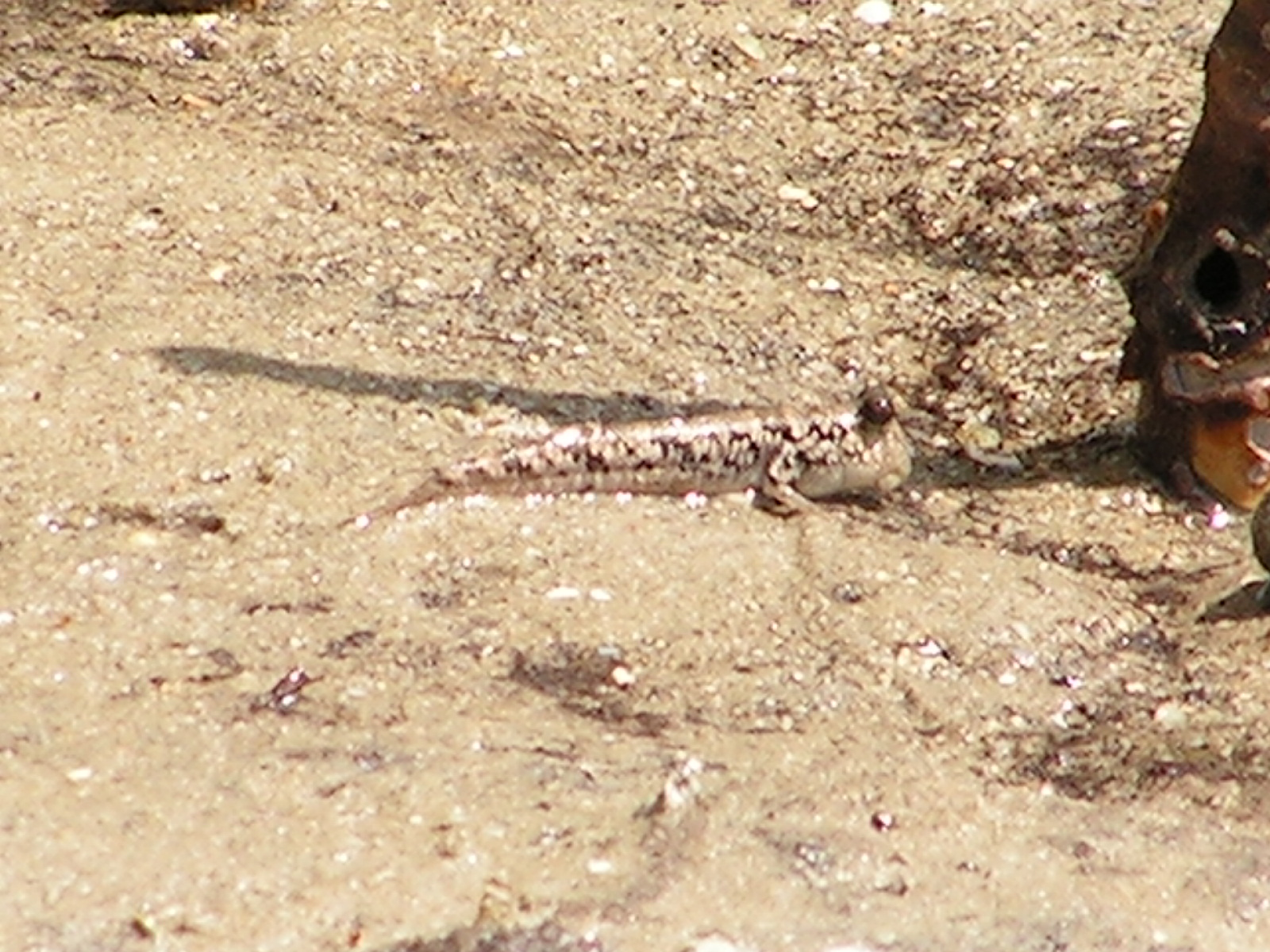
tambasakan fish in Bohol, Philippines

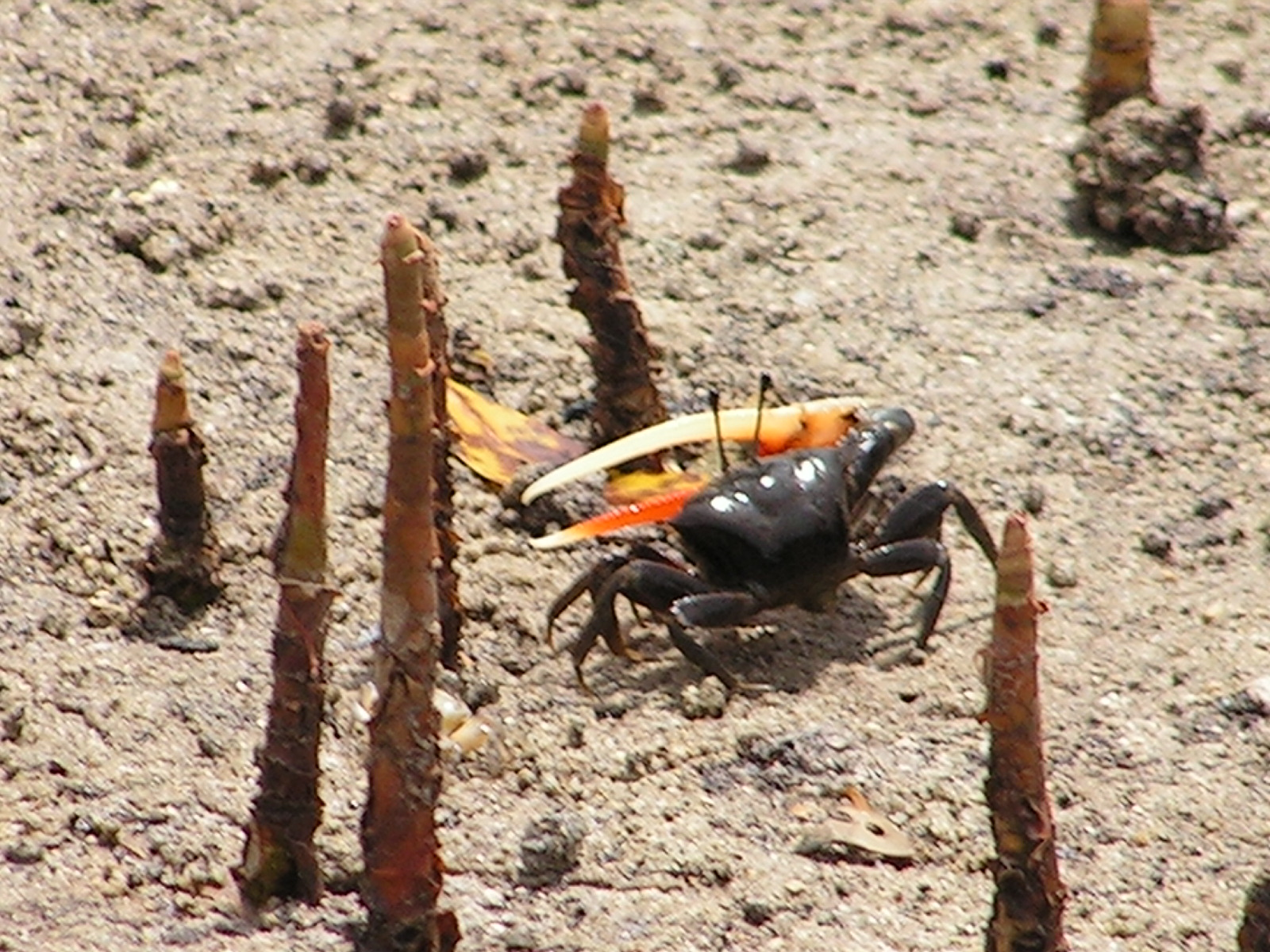
fiddler crab in Bohol, Philippines (Uca sp.; agukoy the Visayan languages)

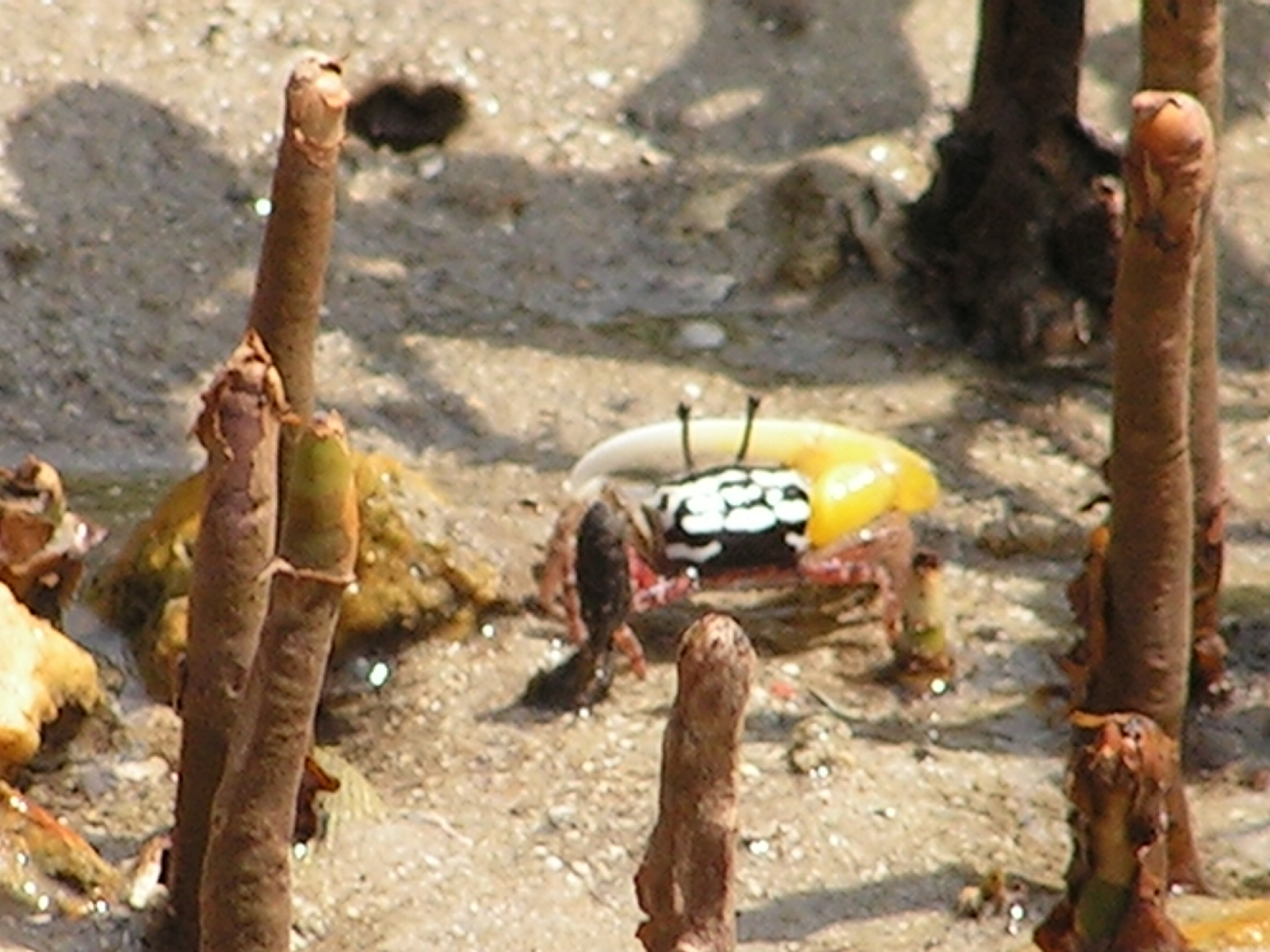
fiddler crab in Bohol, Philippines (Uca sp.; agukoy the Visayan languages)

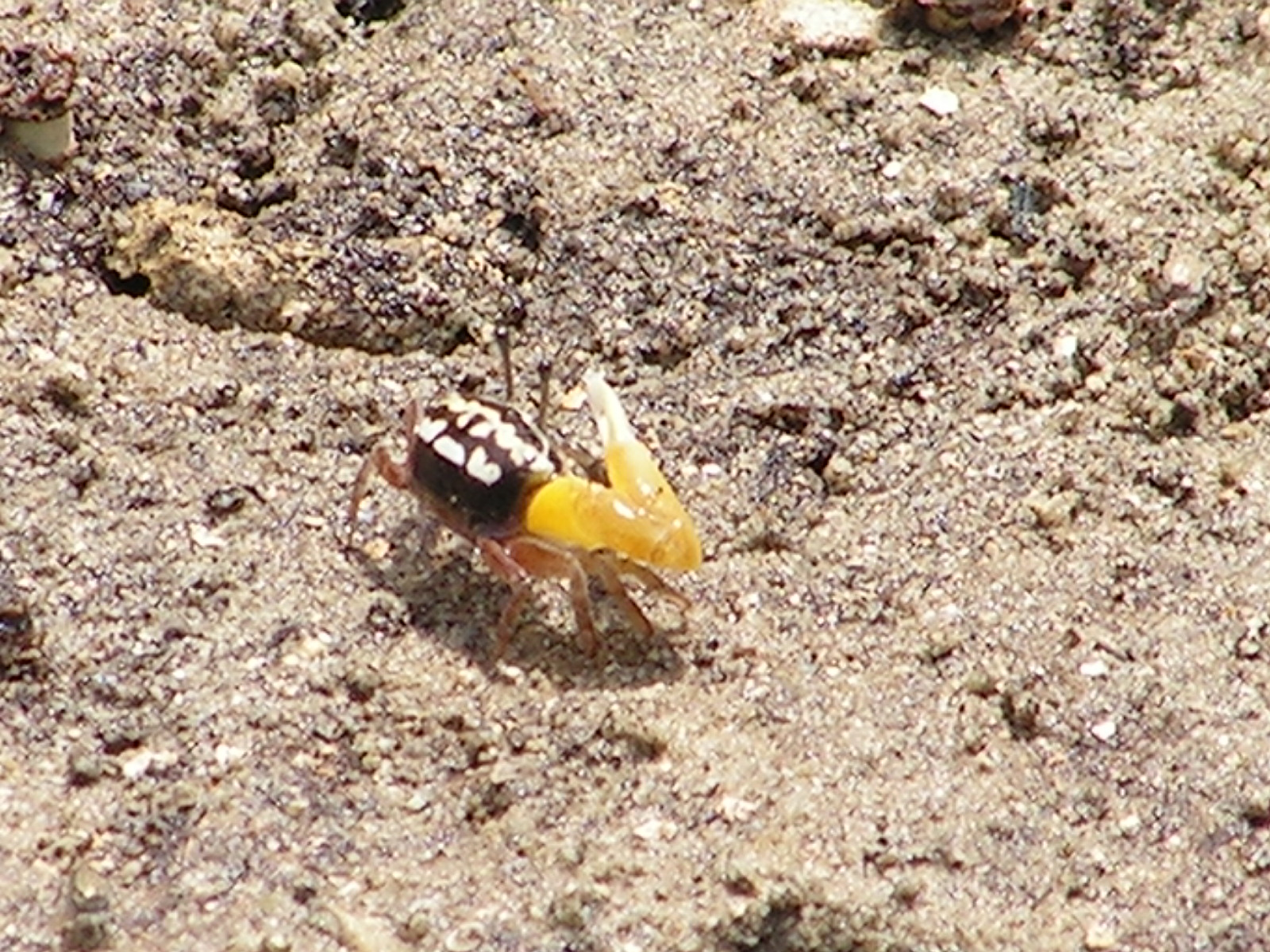
fiddler crab in Bohol, Philippines (Uca sp.; agukoy the Visayan languages)

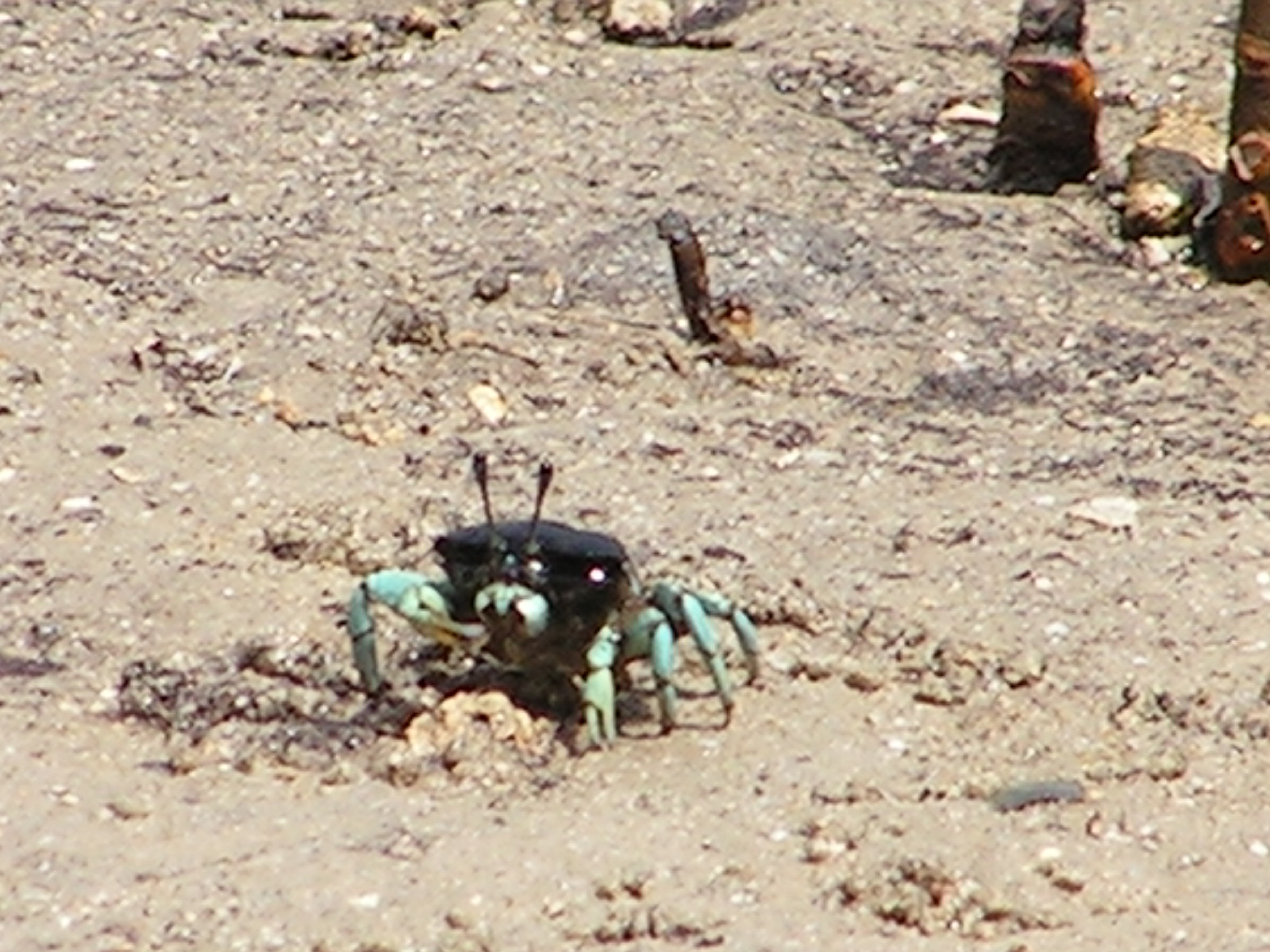
fiddler crab in Bohol, Philippines (Uca sp.; agukoy the Visayan languages)

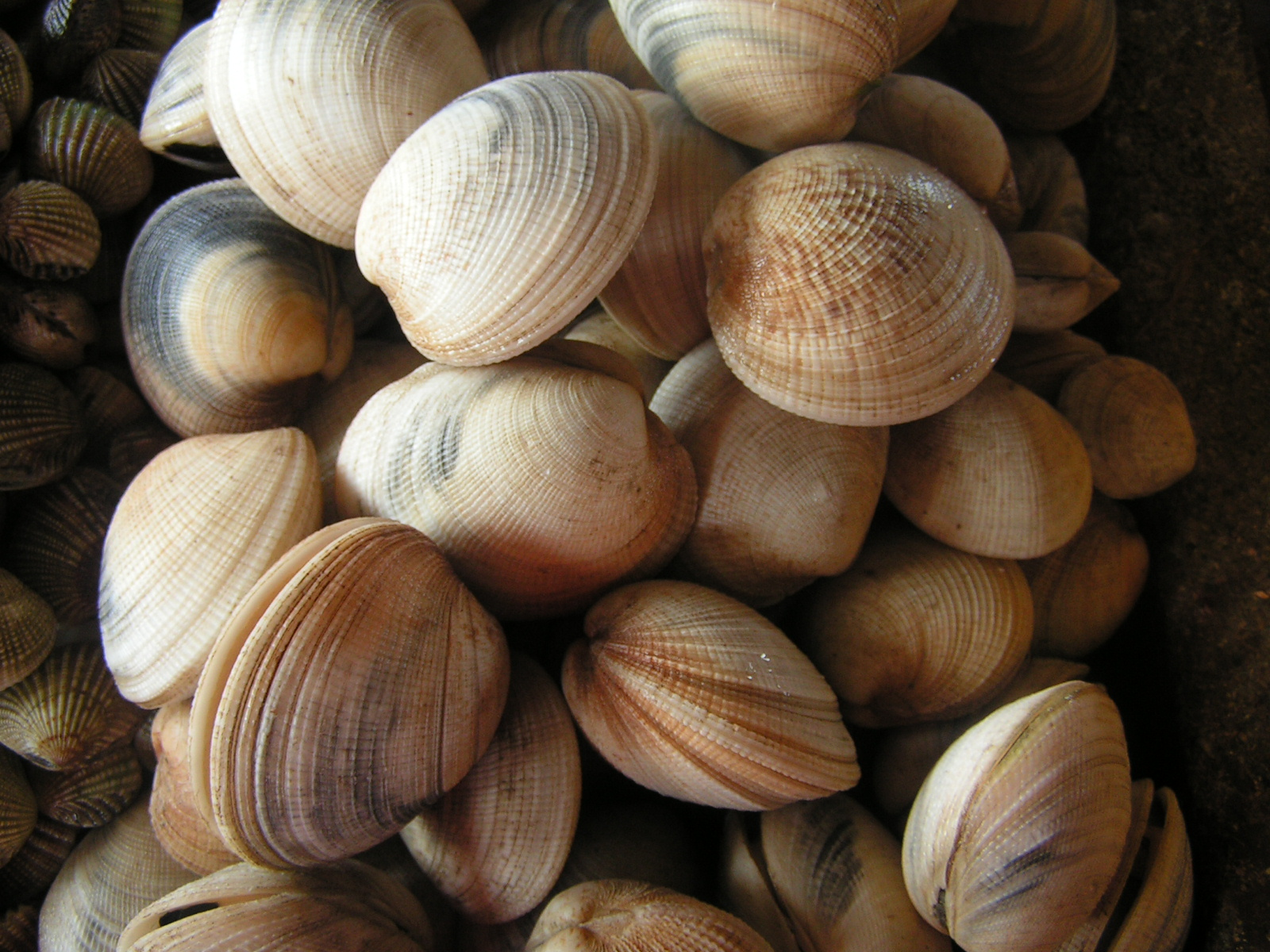
shellfish in Bohol, Philippines

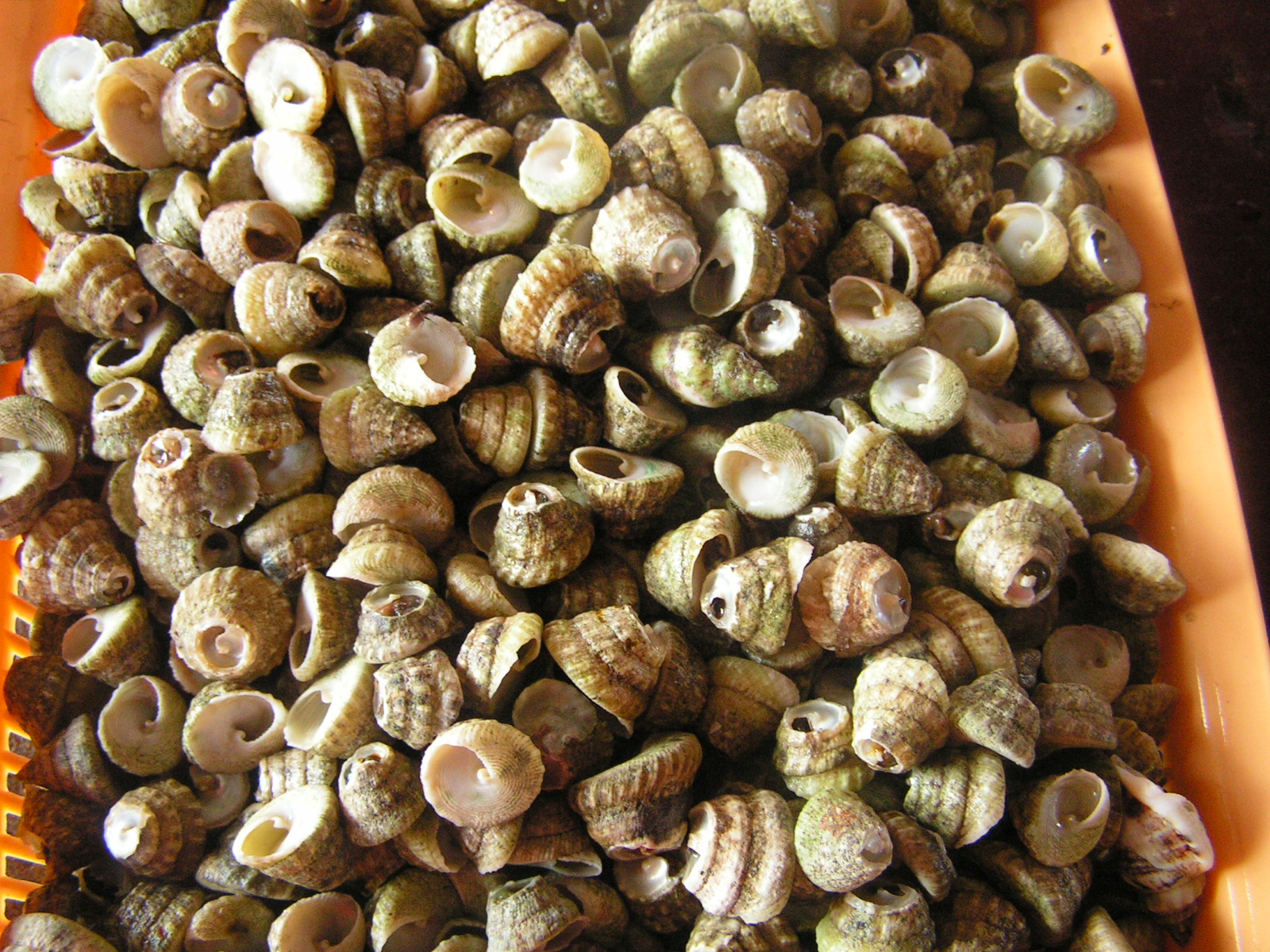
shellfish in Bohol, Philippines

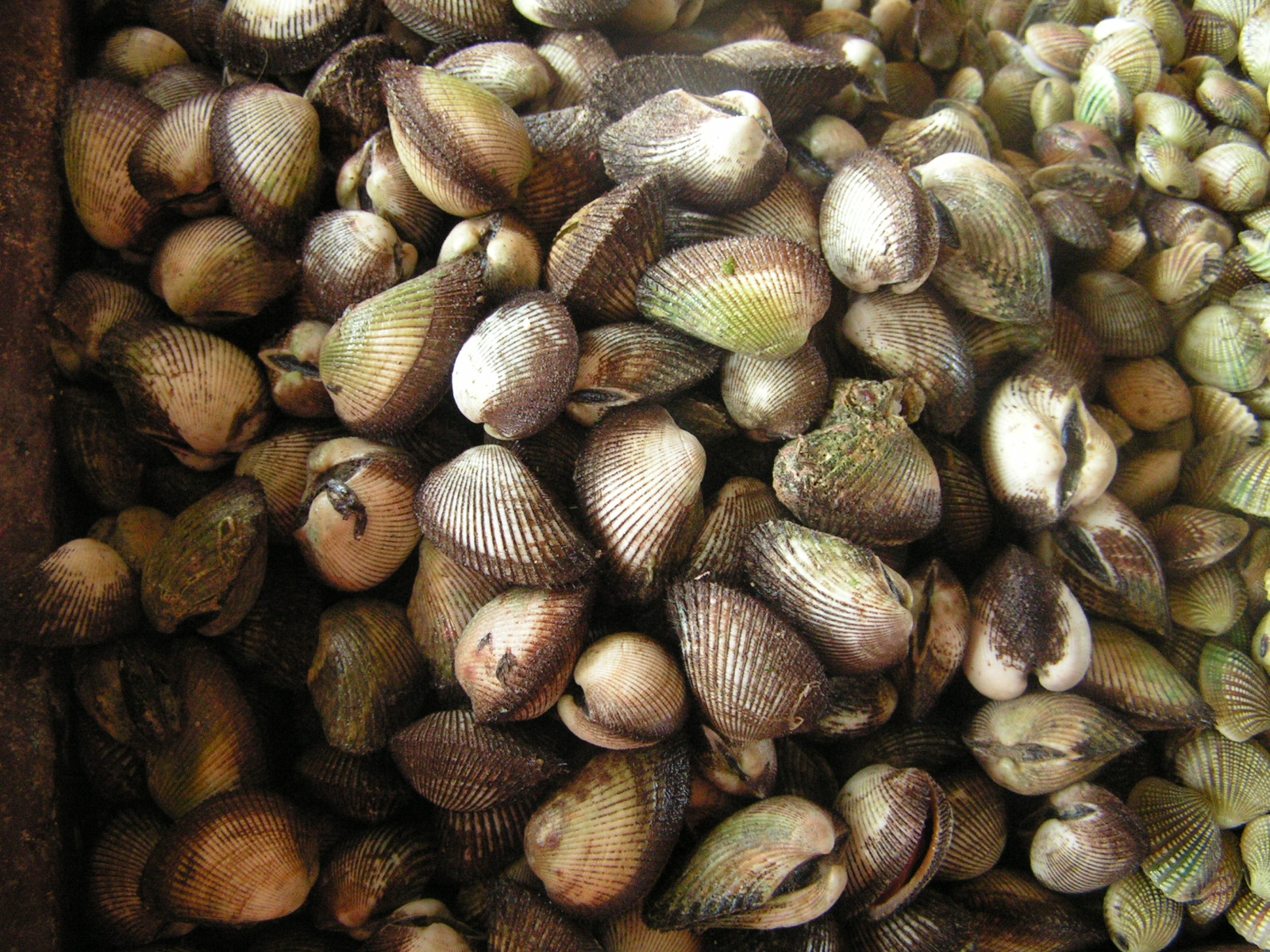
shellfish in Bohol, Philippines

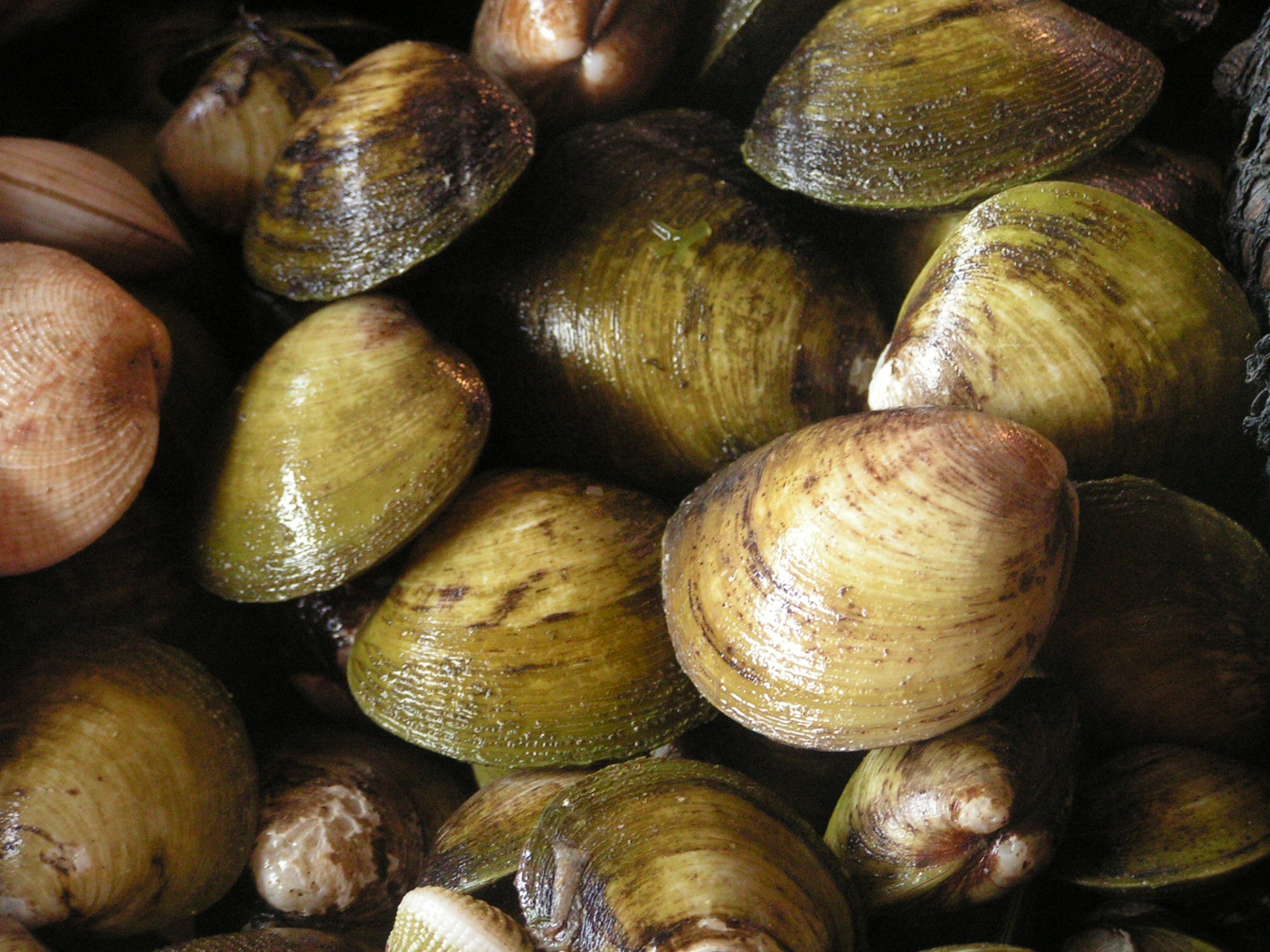
shellfish in Bohol, Philippines

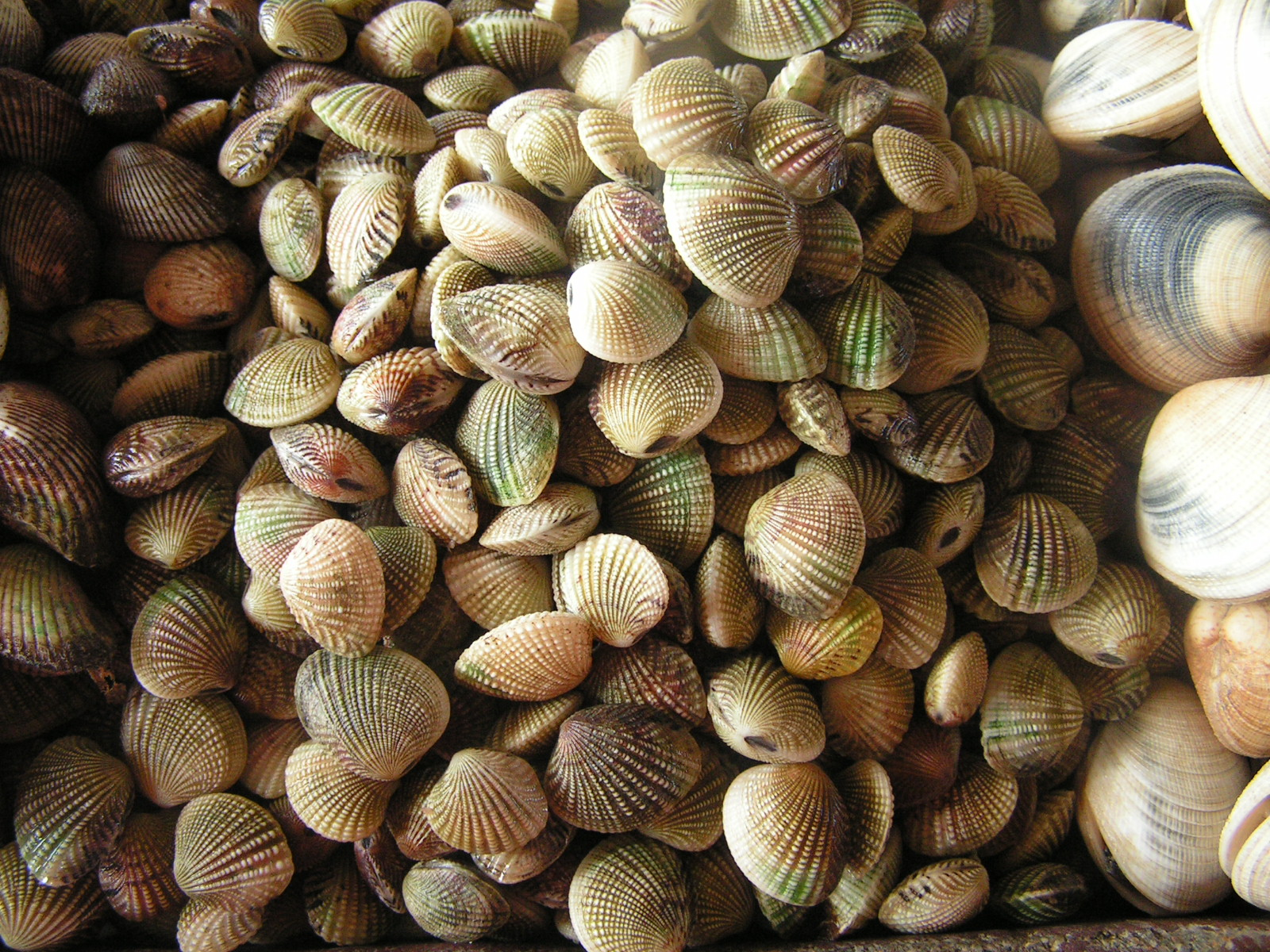
shellfish in Bohol, Philippines

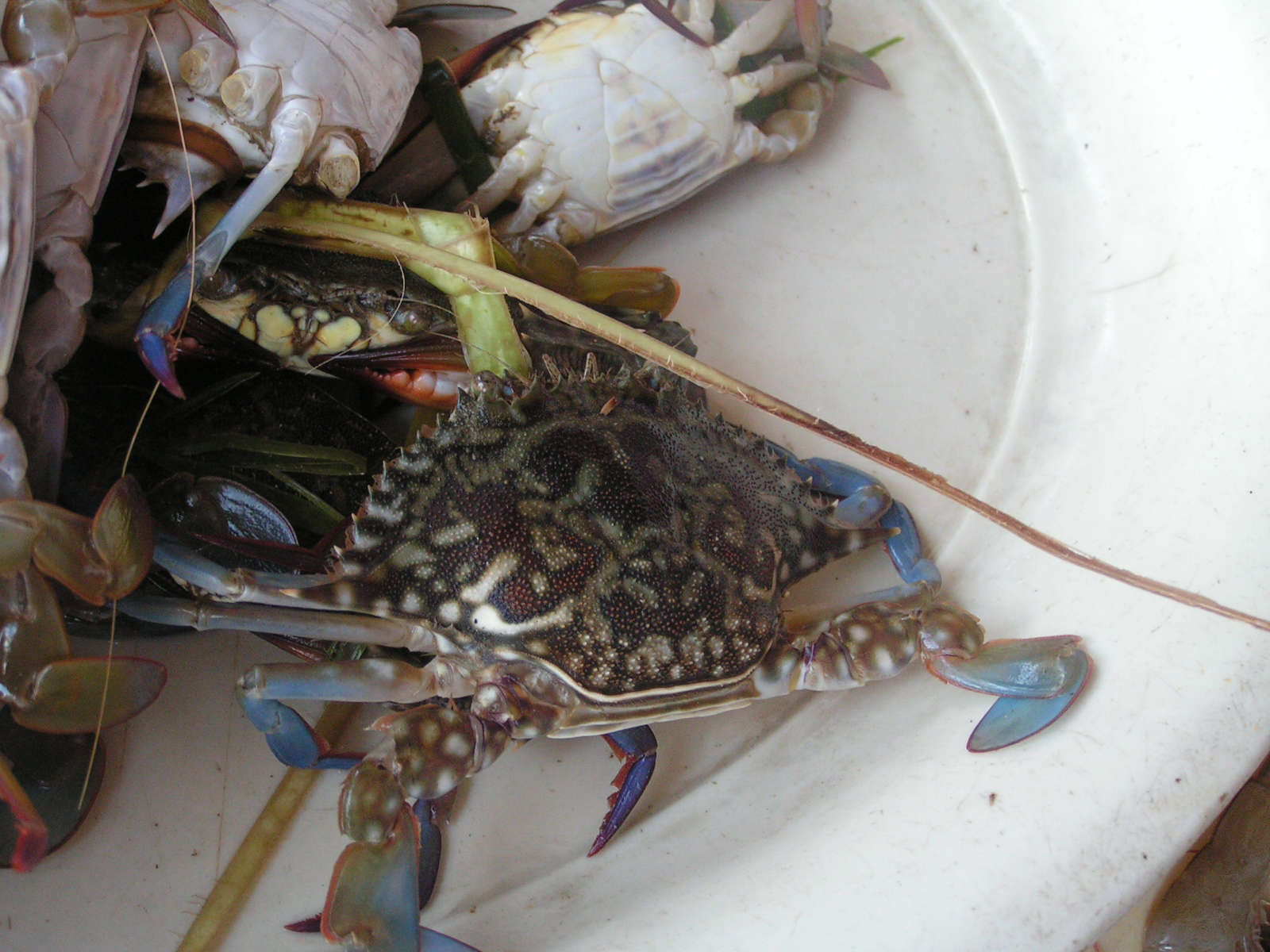
crabs (lambay) in Ubay, Bohol, Philippines

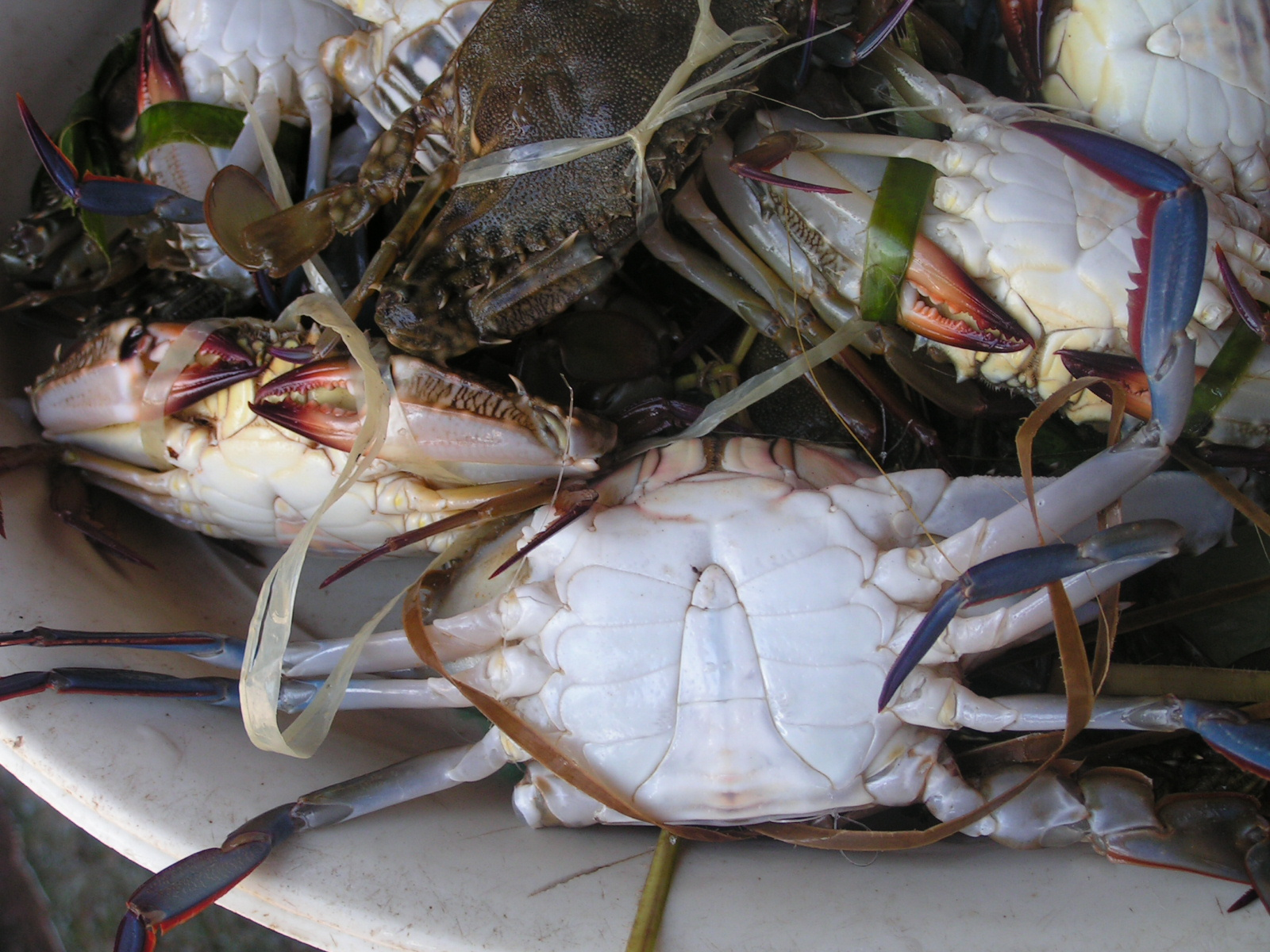
crabs (lambay) in Ubay, Bohol, Philippines

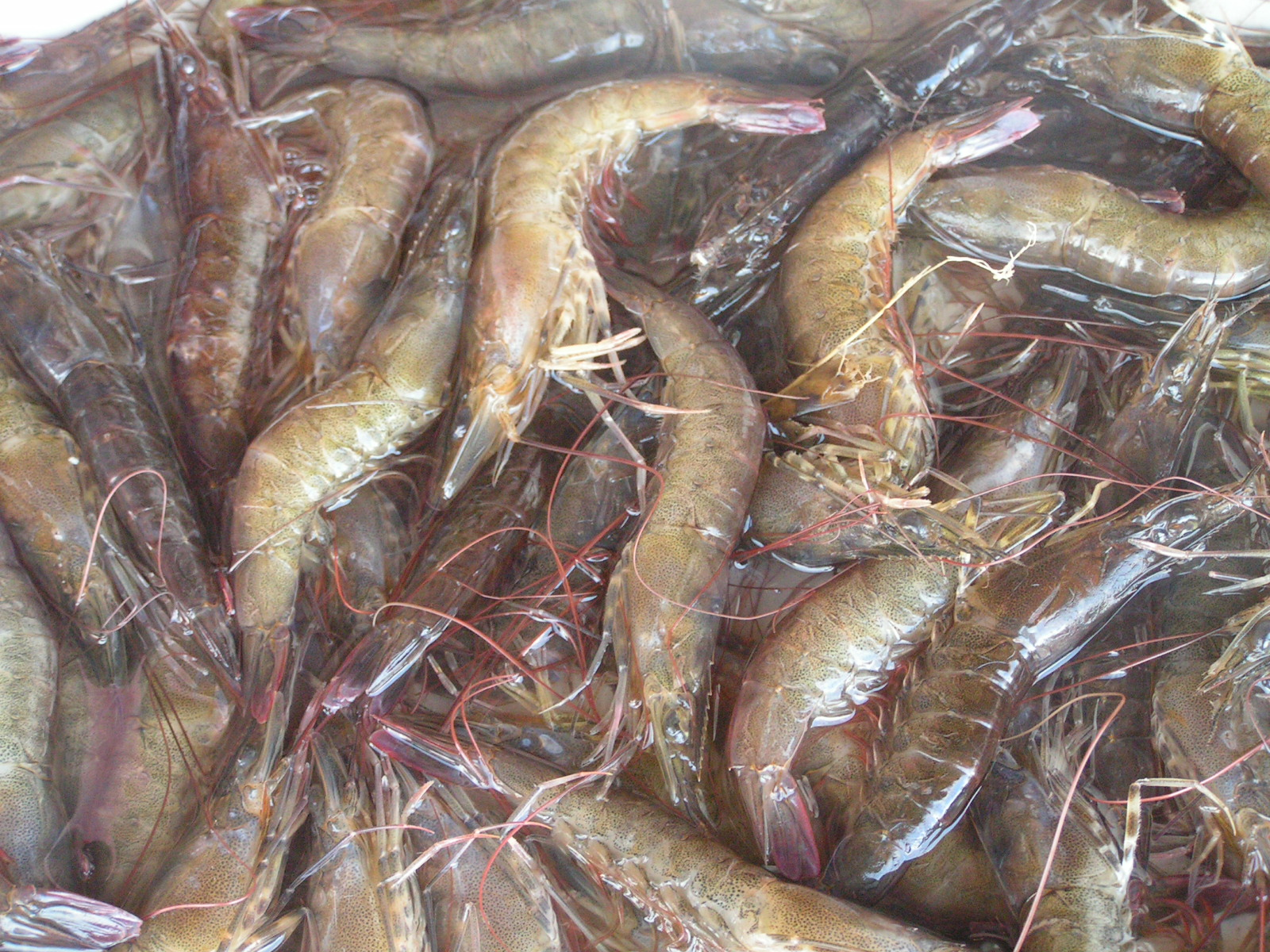
shrimps (pasayan) in Bohol, Philippines

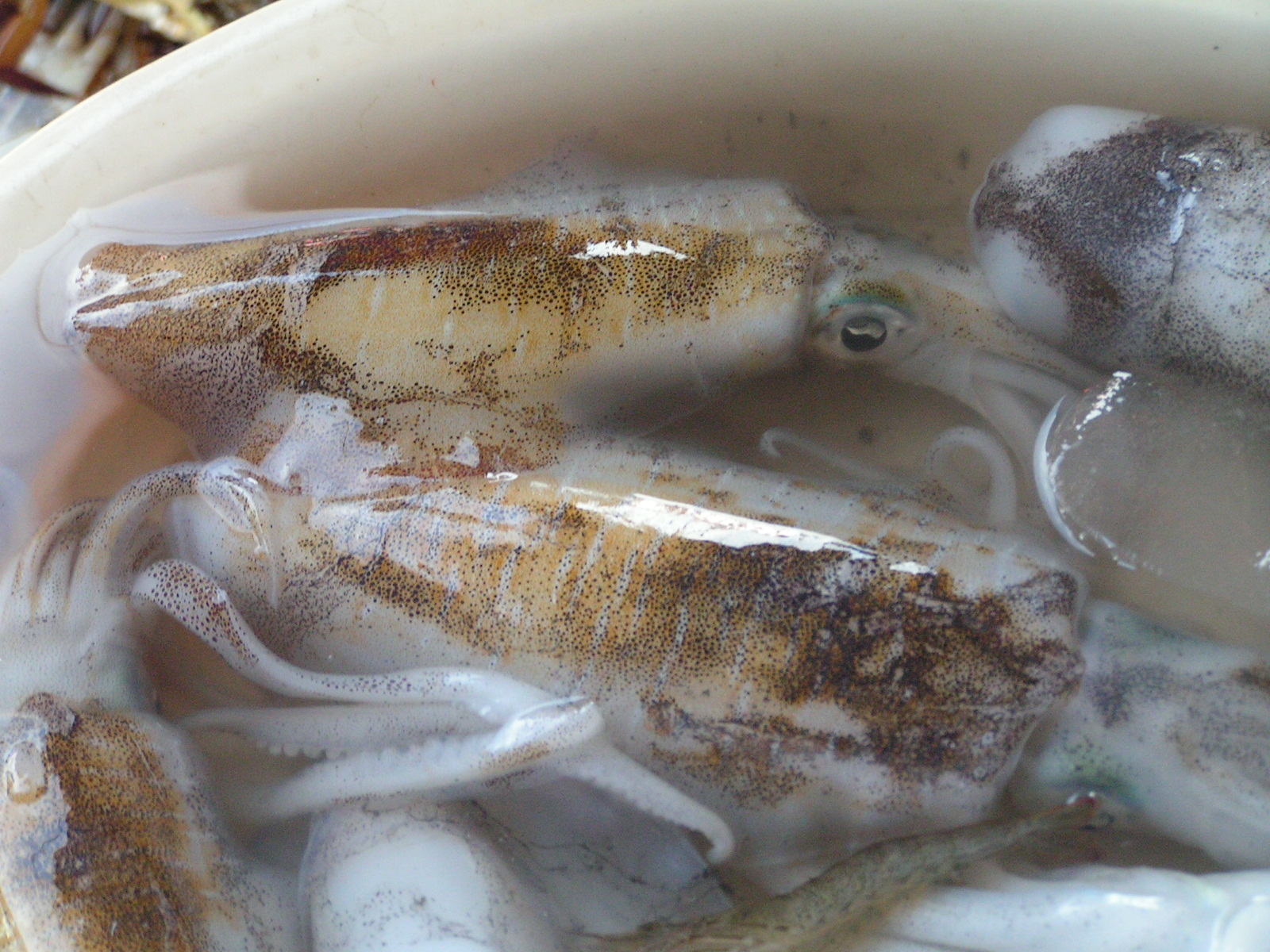
squid (nukos) in Bohol, Philippines

== Gallery Philippine tarsier ==
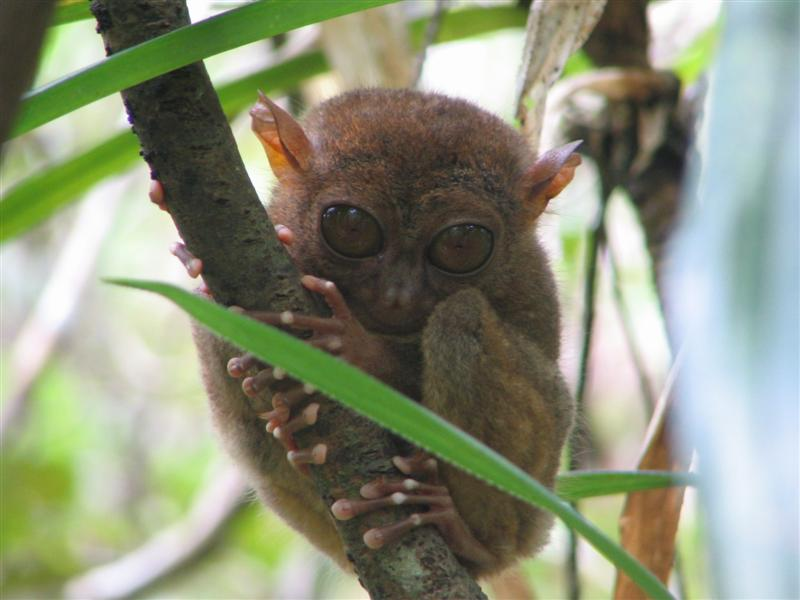
Tarsier in Bohol, Philippines.

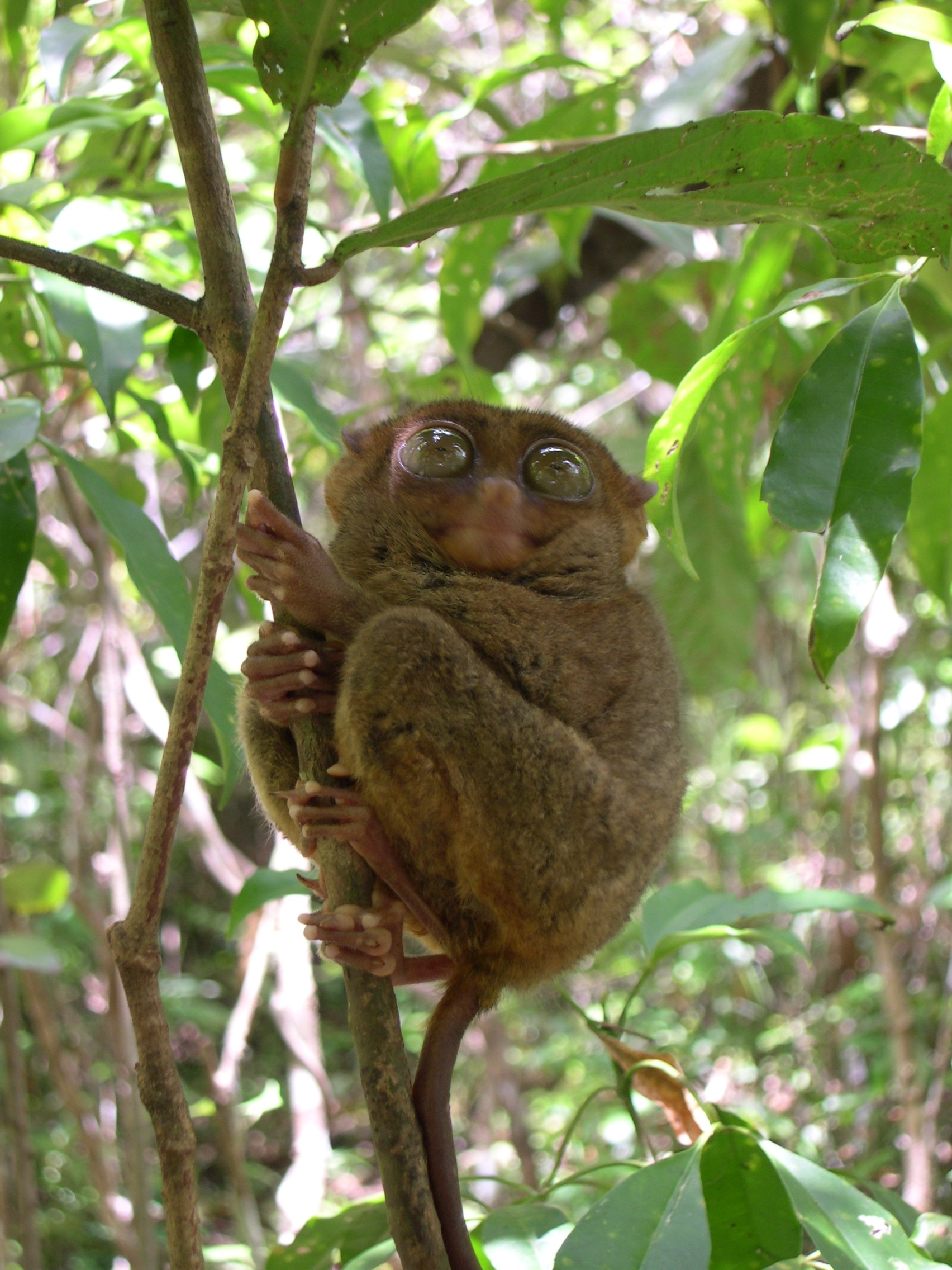
Philippine tarsier

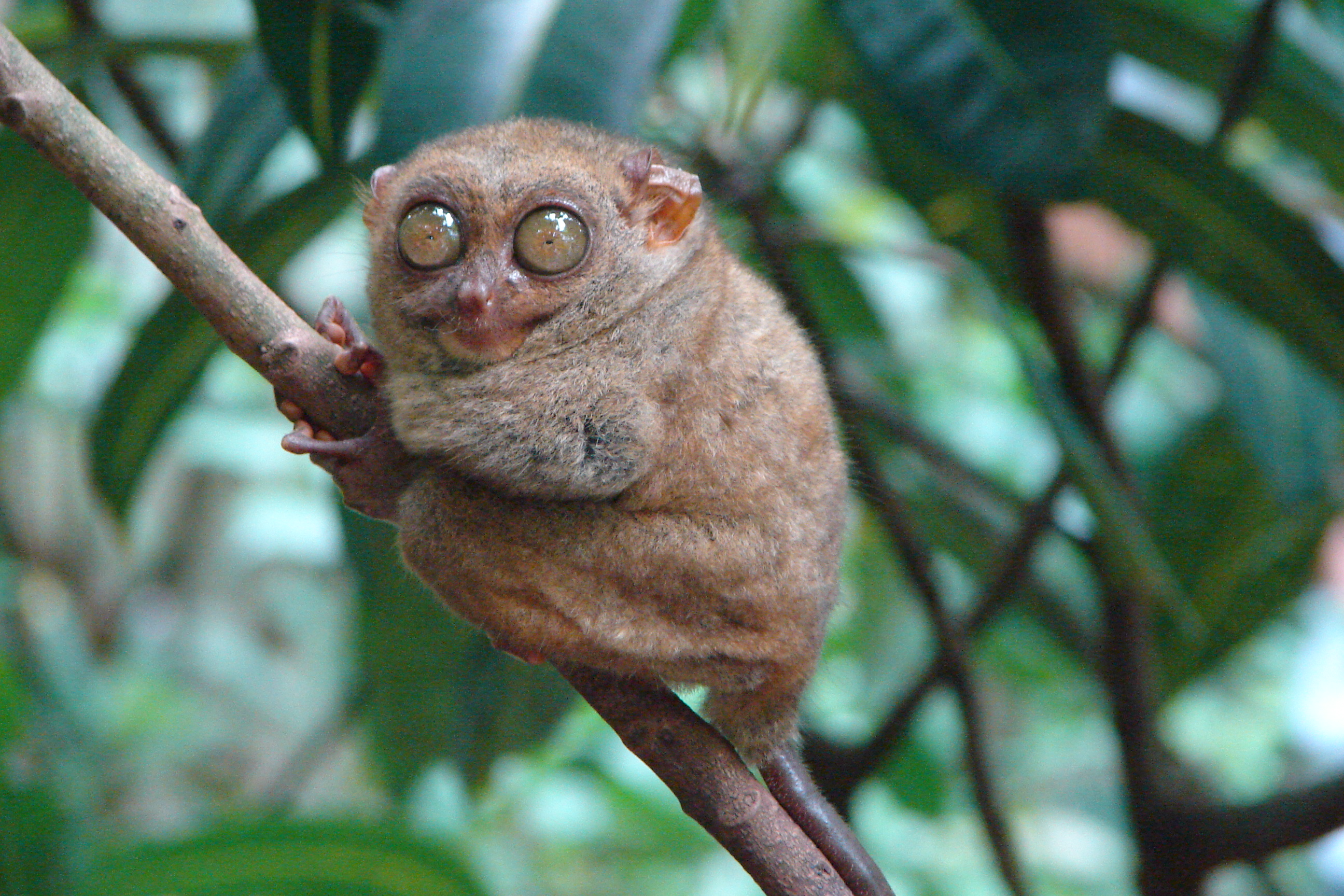

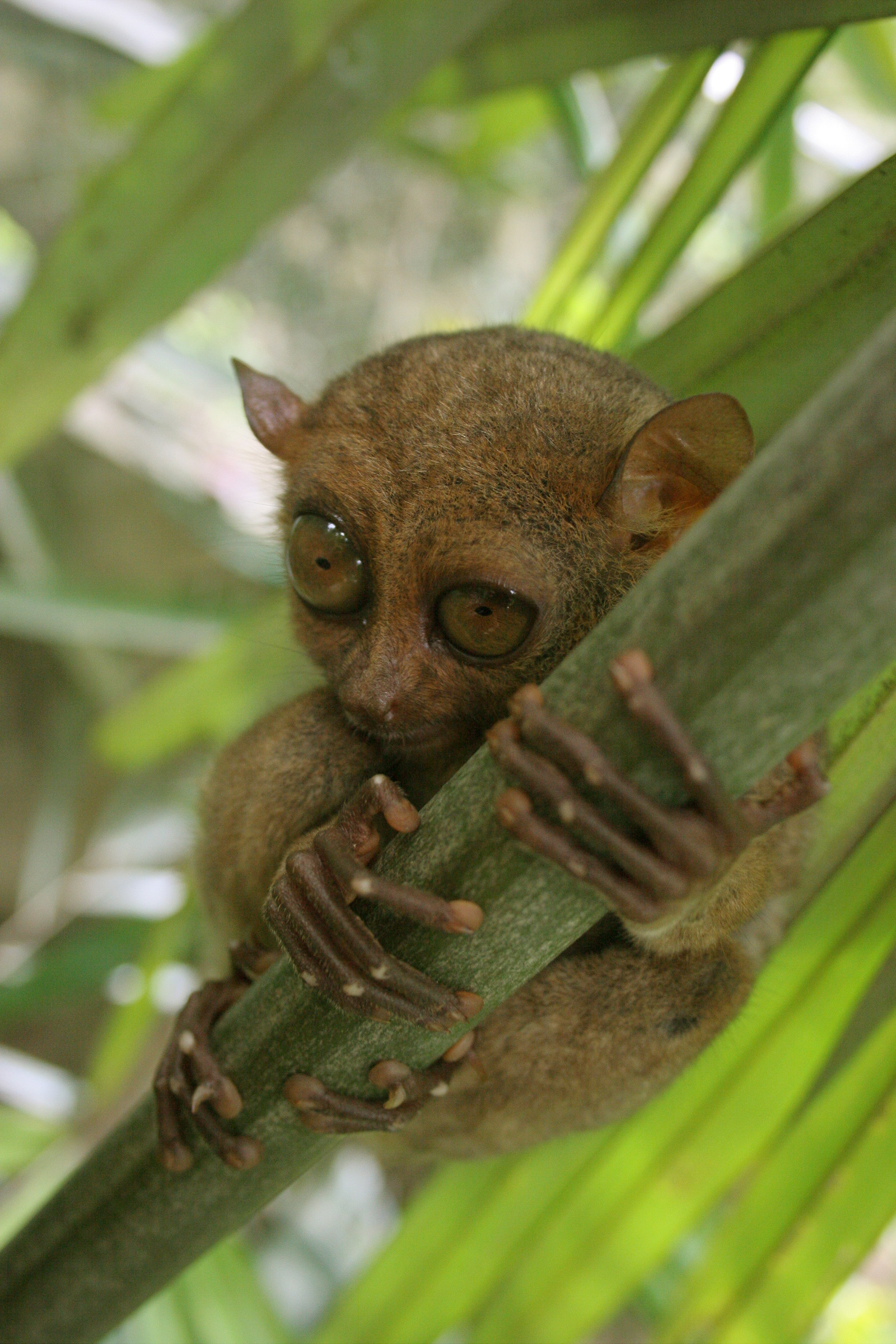

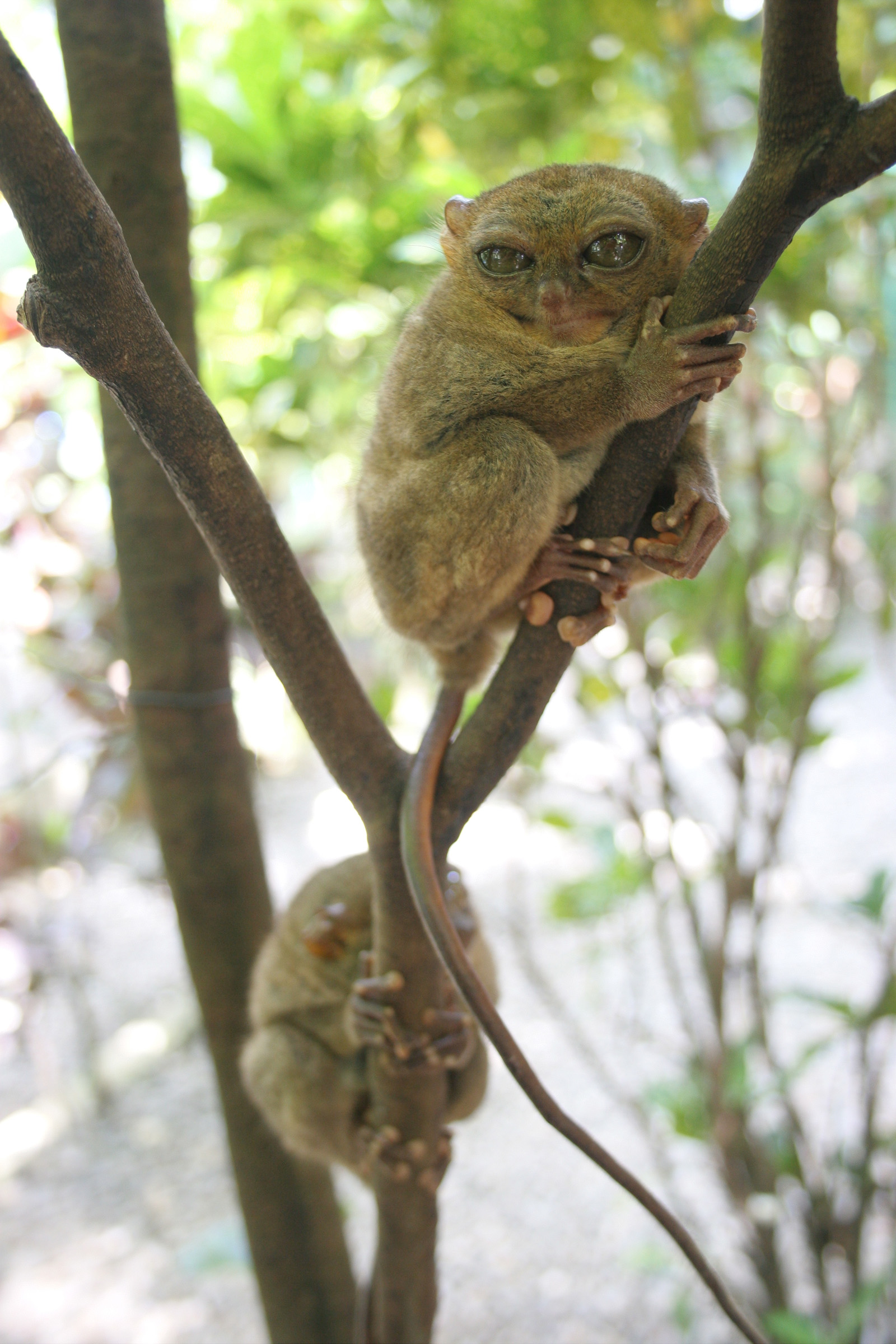

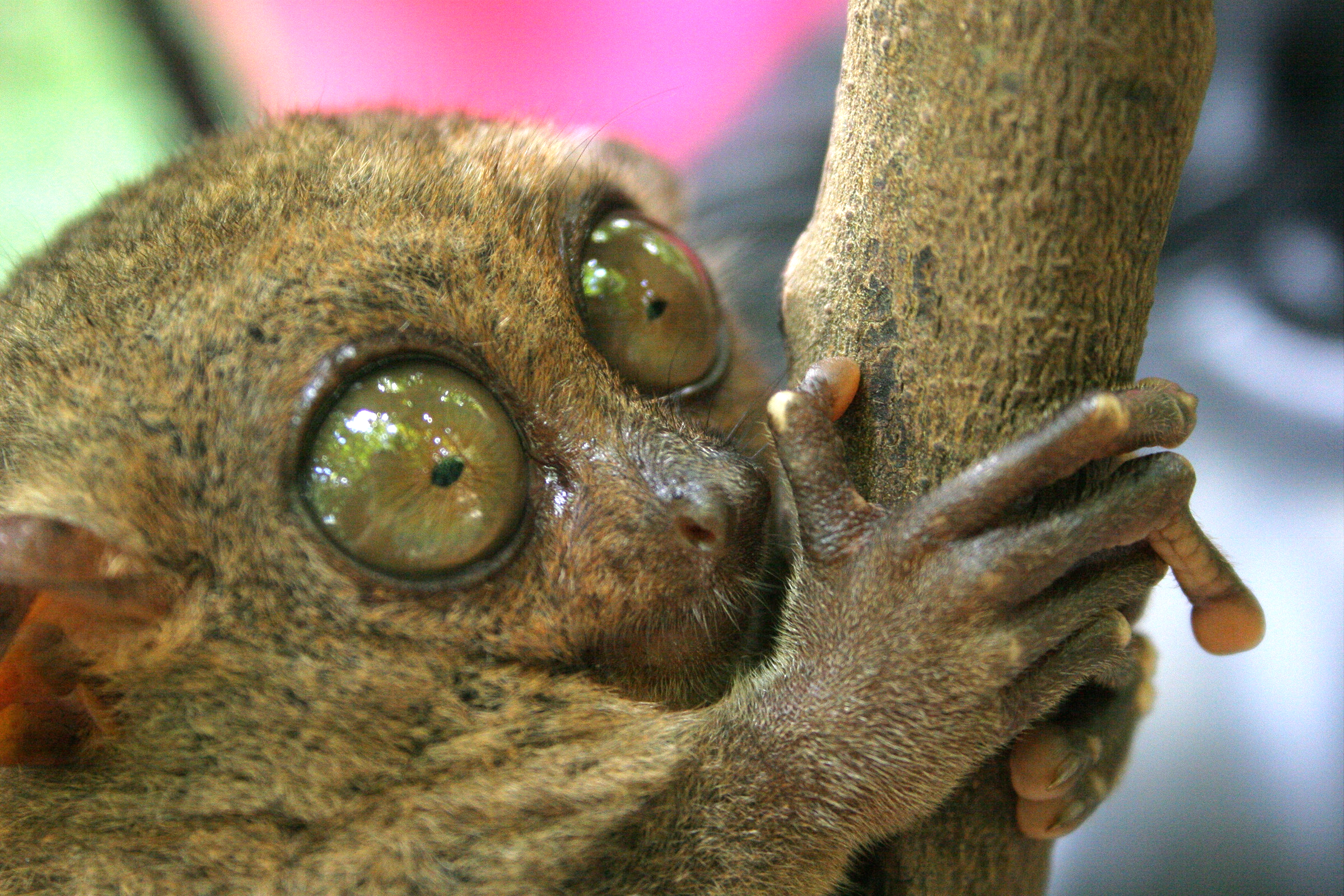

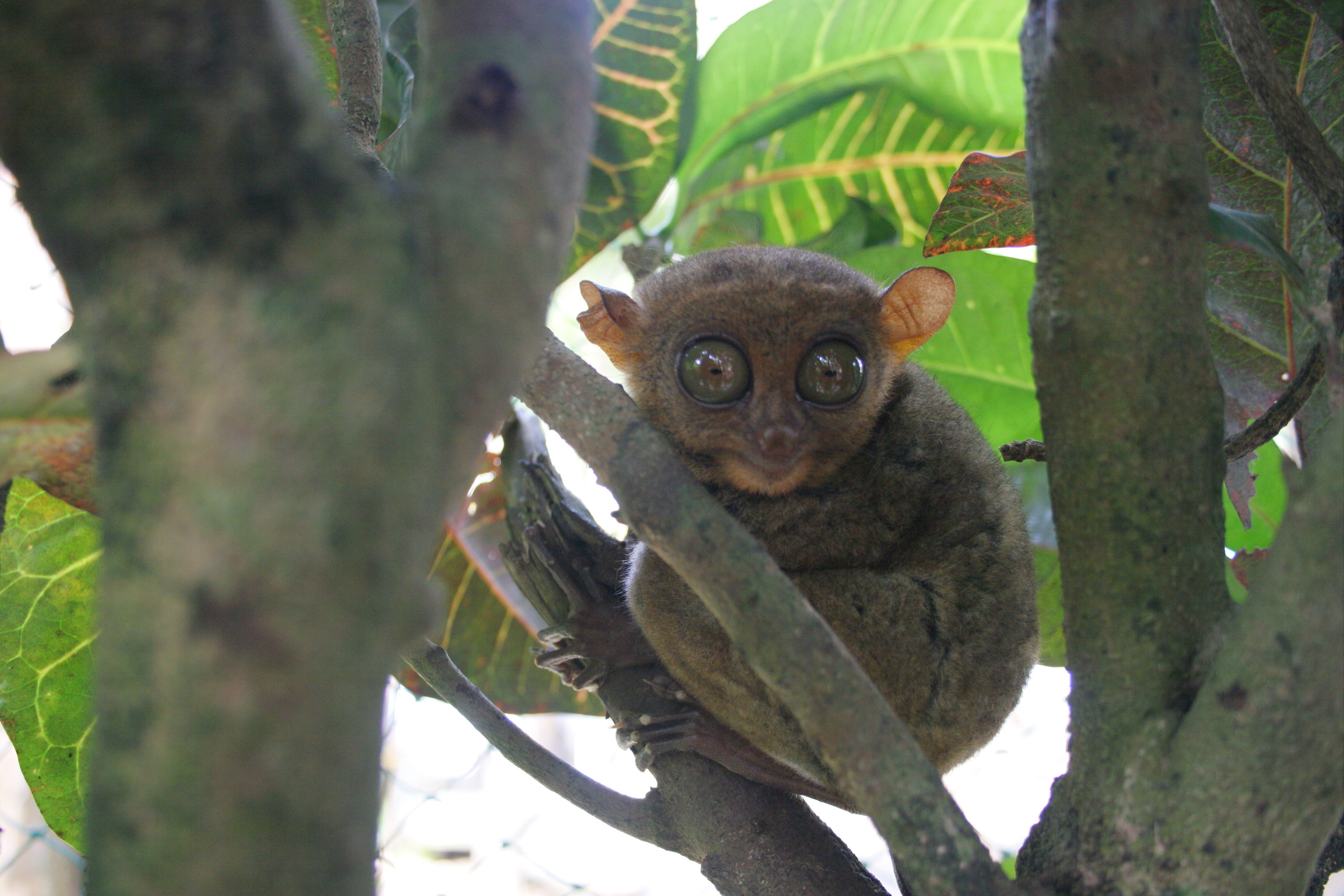

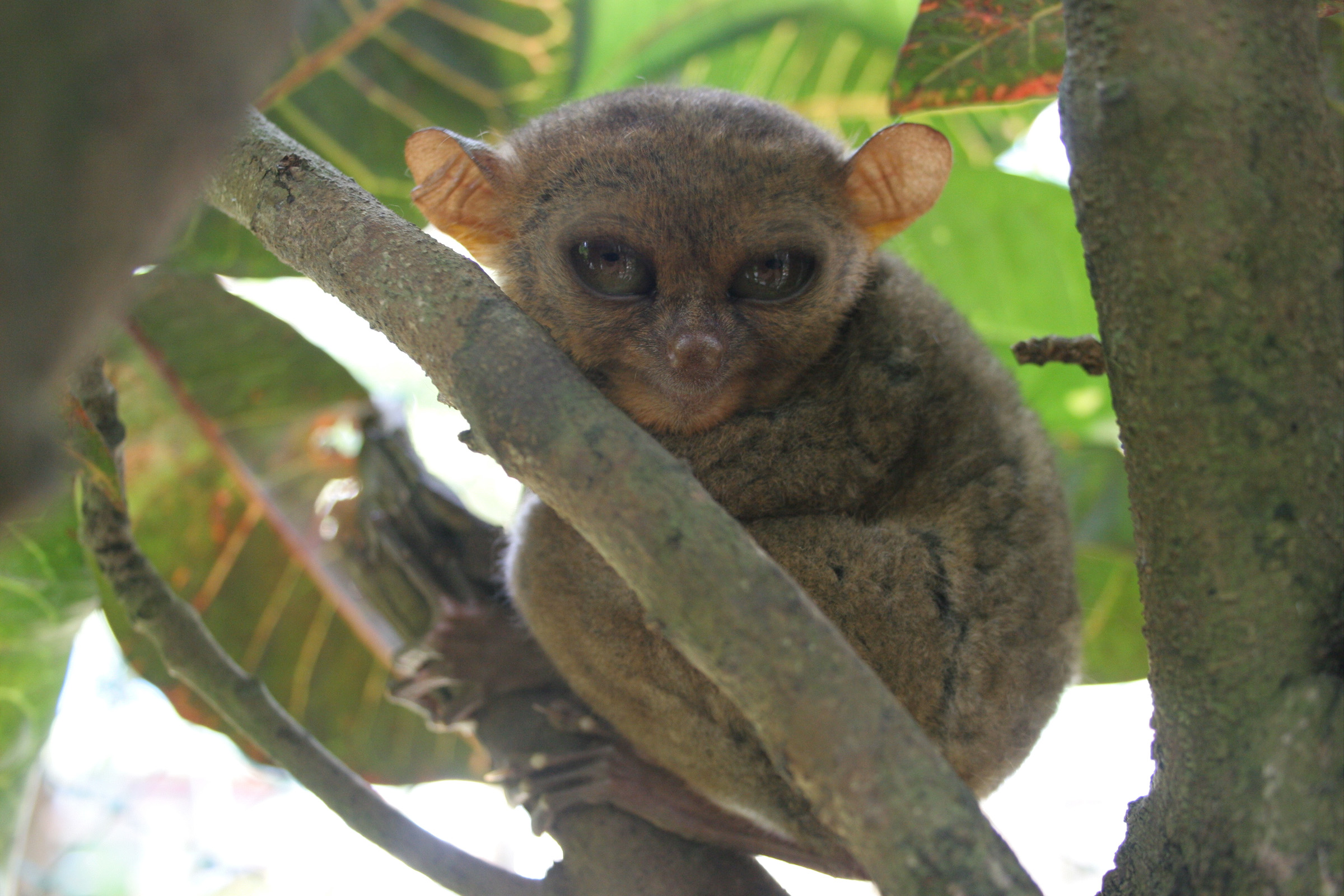
