= List of Penstemon species =

Species in the genus Penstemon are commonly called penstemons or beardtongues in English, and they will often have a common name based on either. As the subgenuses have some taxonomic uncertainty, the species are arranged alphabetically by name in the lists. As of 2024, there are 280 species and seven natural hybrids, according to Plants of the World Online (POWO). The database World Flora Online (WFO) regards all the species listed by POWO as valid, but additionally lists two natural hybrids as species and four additional species as valid.

== Penstemon species ==
These 280 species of Penstemon are considered valid by both World Flora Online (WFO) and Plants of the World Online (POWO), with the exception of Penstemon grandiflorus. In both POWO and WFO, it is regarded as a synonym of Penstemon bradburyi. However, P. grandiflorus continues to be widely used as the correct species name in North America, including by the Flora of North America and the USDA Natural Resources Conservation Service PLANTS database (PLANTS). It is listed as P. grandiflorus in the table with the synonym noted.

Scientific name Authority	Common names	Photo
Penstemon abietinus Pennell	firleaf penstemon	Blue/violet flowers of Penstemon abietinus
Penstemon absarokensis Evert	Absaroka Range penstemon	
Penstemon acaulis L.O.Williams	stemless penstemon	Blue/violet flowers of Penstemon acaulis
Penstemon acuminatus Douglas ex Lindl.	sharpleaf penstemon	Blue/violet flowers of Penstemon acuminatus
Penstemon alamosensis Pennell & G.T.Nisbet	Alamo penstemon	Red/orange flowers of Penstemon alamosensis
Penstemon albertinus Greene	Alberta penstemon	Blue/violet flowers of Penstemon albertinus
Penstemon albidus Nutt.	white penstemon	Pale/white flowers of Penstemon albidus
Penstemon albifluvis England	White River penstemon	Blue/violet flowers of Penstemon albifluvis
Penstemon albomarginatus M.E.Jones	white-margined penstemon	Pink flowers of Penstemon albomarginatus
Penstemon ambiguus Torr.	bush penstemon gilia penstemon	Pink flowers of Penstemon ambiguus
Penstemon ammophilus N.H.Holmgren & L.M.Schultz	sandloving penstemon	
Penstemon amphorellae Crosswh.		Pink flower of Penstemon amphorellae
Penstemon angelicus (I.M.Johnst.) Moran		
Penstemon anguineus Eastw.	Siskiyou penstemon	Blue/violet flower of Penstemon anguineus
Penstemon angustifolius Nutt. ex Pursh	narrowleaf penstemon	Blue/violet flowers of Penstemon angustifolius
Penstemon arenarius Greene	sanddune penstemon	Pink flowers of Penstemon arenarius
Penstemon arenicola A.Nelson	Red Desert penstemon	Blue/violet flowers of Penstemon arenicola
Penstemon aridus Rydb.	stiffleaf penstemon	Blue/violet flowers of Penstemon aridus, the in focus blooms are funnel shaped and face right with three groups of flowers on the inflorecense. They are covered in glandular hairs, quite densely on the buds. More flowering stems are out of focus in the background.
Penstemon arkansanus Pennell	Arkansas penstemon	Pale/white flowers of Penstemon arkansanus
Penstemon atropurpureus (Sweet) G.Don		
Penstemon attenuatus Douglas	sulphur penstemon	Blue/violet flowers of Penstemon attenuatus
Penstemon atwoodii S.L.Welsh	Kaiparowits penstemon	Blue/violet flowers of Penstemon atwoodii
Penstemon auriberbis Pennell	Colorado penstemon	Blue/violet flowers of Penstemon auriberbis
Penstemon australis Small	Eustis Lake penstemon	Pink flowers of Penstemon australis
Penstemon azureus Benth.	azure penstemon	Blue/violet flowers of Penstemon azureus, the nine open flowers are in a tight group from upper left to lower right, the open mouths showing the four dark fertile stamens within the flower with out of focus slightly blueish-green leaves behind.
Penstemon baccharifolius Hook.	baccharisleaf penstemon	Red/orange flowers of Penstemon baccharifolius
Penstemon barbatus (Cav.) Roth	golden-beard penstemon beardlip penstemon	Red/orange flowers of Penstemon barbatus
Penstemon barnebyi N.H.Holmgren	Barneby's penstemon White River Valley penstemon	Blue/violet flowers of Penstemon barnebyi
Penstemon barrettiae A.Gray	Barrett's penstemon	Blue/violet flowers of Penstemon barrettiae
Penstemon bicolor (Brandegee) Clokey & D.D.Keck	pinto penstemon	Yellow flowers of Penstemon bicolor
Penstemon bleaklyi O'Kane & K.D.Heil	bleakly penstemon	Blue/violet flowers of Penstemon bleaklyi
Penstemon bolanius Straw		Blue/violet flower of Penstemon bolanius
Penstemon bracteatus D.D.Keck	Red Canyon penstemon	Blue/violet flowers of Penstemon bracteatus, the three flowers emerging from behind a small cluster of somewhat thick basal leaves that are curved inwards and have purplish edges. The plant is growing from red-orange rocky soil.
Penstemon breviculus (D.D.Keck) G.T.Nisbet & R.C.Jacks.	shortstem penstemon	Blue/violet flowers of Penstemon breviculus
Penstemon brevisepalus Pennell	short-sepaled penstemon	Pale/white flowers of Penstemon brevisepalus
Penstemon buckleyi Pennell	buckley penstemon	Blue/violet flowers of penstemon buckleyi
Penstemon caesius A.Gray	San Bernardino penstemon	Blue/violet flowers of Penstemon caesius
Penstemon caespitosus Nutt. ex A.Gray	mat penstemon	Blue/violet flowers of Penstemon caespitosus
Penstemon calcareus Brandegee	limestone penstemon	Pink flowers of Penstemon calcareus
Penstemon californicus (Munz & I.M.Johnst.) D.D.Keck	California penstemon	Blue/violet flower of Penstemon californicus
Penstemon calycosus Small	longsepal penstemon	Blue/violet flowers of Penstemon calycosus
Penstemon campanulatus (Cav.) Willd.	bellflower penstemon	Blue/violet flowers of Penstemon campanulatus
Penstemon canescens Britton	eastern gray penstemon	Pale pink to blue flowers of Penstemon canescens
Penstemon cardinalis Wooton & Standl.	cardinal penstemon	Red/orange flowers of Penstemon cardinalis
Penstemon cardwellii Howell	Cardwell's penstemon	Blue/violet flowers of Penstemon cardwellii
Penstemon carnosus Pennell	fleshy penstemon	Blue/violet flowers of Penstemon carnosus
Penstemon caryi Pennell	Cary's penstemon	Blue/violet flowers of Penstemon caryi
Penstemon centranthifolius (Benth.) Benth.	scarlet bugler	Red/orange flowers of Penstemon centranthifolius, the purplish stem has many narrow flowers attached in groups next to green bracts
Penstemon cerrosensis Kellogg	Cedros island penstemon	Red/orange flowers of Penstemon cerrosensis
Penstemon cinicola D.D.Keck	ash penstemon	Blue/violet flowers of Penstemon cinicola
Penstemon clevelandii A.Gray	Cleveland's penstemon	Pink flowers of Penstemon clevelandii
Penstemon clutei A.Nelson	Sunset Crater penstemon	Pink flowers of Penstemon clutei
Penstemon cobaea Nutt.	cobaea penstemon	Pink flowers of Penstemon cobaea
Penstemon comarrhenus A.Gray	dusty penstemon	Blue/violet flowers of Penstemon comarrhenus
Penstemon concinnus D.D.Keck	Tunnel Springs penstemon	Blue/violet flowers of Penstemon concinnus
Penstemon confertus Douglas	yellow penstemon	Yellow flowers of Penstemon confertus
Penstemon confusus M.E.Jones	mistaken penstemon	Pink flowers of Penstemon confusus
Penstemon crandallii A.Nelson	Crandall's penstemon	Blue/violet flowers of Penstemon crandallii
Penstemon curtiflorus (D.D.Keck) N.H.Holmgren		
Penstemon cusickii A.Gray	Cusick's penstemon	Blue/violet flowers of Penstemon cusickii
Penstemon cyananthus Hook.	Wasatch penstemon	Blue/violet flowers of Penstemon cyananthus
Penstemon cyaneus Pennell	blue penstemon	Blue/violet flowers of Penstemon cyaneus
Penstemon cyanocaulis Payson	bluestem penstemon	Blue/violet flowers of Penstemon cyanocaulis
Penstemon cyathophorus Rydb.	cupped penstemon Middle Park penstemon	Pink flowers of Penstemon cyathophorus
Penstemon dasyphyllus A.Gray	grama grass penstmon Gila penstemon	Blue/violet flower of Penstemon dasyphyllus
Penstemon davidsonii Greene	Davidson's penstemon timberline penstemon	Blue/violet flowers of Penstemon davidsonii
Penstemon deamii Pennell	Deam's penstemon	Pale/white flowers of Penstemon deamii
Penstemon deaveri Crosswh.	Mount Graham penstemon Deaver's Penstemon	Blue/violet flowers of Penstemon davidsonii
Penstemon debilis O'Kane & J.L.Anderson	Parachute penstemon	Pale/white flowers of Penstemon debilis
Penstemon degeneri Crosswh.	Degener's penstemon	Blue/violet flowers of Penstemon degeneri
Penstemon deustus Douglas ex Lindl.	scabland penstemon	Pale/white flowers of Penstemon deustus
Penstemon digitalis Nutt. ex Sims	talus slope penstemon foxglove penstemon	Pale/white flowers of Penstemon digitalis
Penstemon diphyllus Rydb.	twoleaf penstemon	Blue/violet flowers of Penstemon diphyllus
Penstemon discolor D.D.Keck	Catalina penstemon	Pale/white flowers of Penstemon discolor
Penstemon dissectus Elliott	dissected penstemon	Blue/violet flower of Penstemon dissectus
Penstemon distans N.H.Holmgren	Mt. Tumbull penstemon	
Penstemon dolius M.E.Jones	Jones's penstemon	Blue/violet flower of Penstemon dolius
Penstemon dugesii Pérez-Calix & Zacarías		
Penstemon duchesnensis (N.H.Holmgren) Neese	Duchesne penstemon	Blue/violet flowers of Penstemon duchesnensis
Penstemon eatonii A.Gray	Eaton's penstemon firecracker penstemon	Red/orange flowers of Penstemon eatonii
Penstemon elegantulus Pennell	rockvine penstemon	
Penstemon ellipticus J.M.Coult. & Fisher	eggleaf penstemon rocky ledge penstemon	Blue/violet flowers of Penstemon ellipticus
Penstemon eriantherus Nutt. ex Pursh	fuzzytongue penstemon	Illustraion of Penstemon erianthera
Penstemon euglaucus English	glaucous penstemon	Blue/violet flowers of Penstemon euglaucus
Penstemon eximius D.D.Keck	extrodinary penstemon	
Penstemon fasciculatus A.Gray		
Penstemon fendleri Torr. & A.Gray	fendler penstemon	Blue/violet flowers of Penstemon fendleri
Penstemon filiformis (D.D.Keck) D.D.Keck	threadleaf penstemon	Blue/violet flowers of Penstemon filiformis
Penstemon filisepalis Straw		
Penstemon flavescens Pennell	high mountain penstemon	Yellow flowers of Penstemon flavescens
Penstemon floribundus Danley	Cordillia's penstemon	
Penstemon floridus Brandegee	Panamint penstemon	Pink flowers of Penstemon floridus
Penstemon flowersii Neese & S.L.Welsh	Flowers' penstemon	Pink flowers of Penstemon flowersii
Penstemon franklinii S.L.Welsh	Franklin's penstemon	
Penstemon fremontii Torr. & A.Gray	Fremont penstemon	Blue/violet flowers of Penstemon fremontii
Penstemon fruticiformis Coville	Death Valley penstemon	Pink flowers of Penstemon fruticiformis
Penstemon fruticosus (Pursh) Greene	Greene bush penstemon	Blue/violet flowers of Penstemon fruticosus
Penstemon gairdneri Hook.	Gairdner's penstemon	Blue/violet flowers of Penstemon gairdneri
Penstemon galloensis G.L.Nesom		
Penstemon gentianoides (Kunth) Poir.	gentian penstemon	Blue/violet flowers of Penstemon gentianoides
Penstemon gentryi Standl.		
Penstemon gibbensii Dorn	Gibbens' penstemon	Blue/violet flowers of Penstemon gibbensii
Penstemon glaber Pursh	sawsepal penstemon	Blue/violet flowers of Penstemon glaber
Penstemon glandulosus Douglas ex Lindl.	stickystem penstemon	Blue/violet flowers of Penstemon glandulosus
Penstemon glaucinus Pennell	blueleaf penstemon	
Penstemon globosus (Piper) Pennell & D.D.Keck	globe penstemon	Blue/violet flowers of Penstemon globosus
Penstemon goodrichii N.H.Holmgren	Lapoint penstemon	Blue/violet flowers of Penstemon goodrichii
Penstemon gormanii Greene	Yukon penstemon	Blue/violet flowers of Penstemon gormanii
Penstemon gracilentus A.Gray	slender penstemon	Blue/violet flowers of Penstemon gracilentus
Penstemon gracilis Nutt.	lilac penstemon slender penstemon	Blue/violet flowers of Penstemon gracilis
Penstemon grandiflorus Nutt. Penstemon bradburyi Pursh	large flower penstemon shell-leaf penstemon	Blue/violet flowers of Penstemon grandiflorus
Penstemon grahamii D.D.Keck	Uinta Basin penstemon	Pink flowers of Penstemon grahamii
Penstemon griffinii A.Nelson	Griffin's penstemon	Blue/violet flowers of Penstemon grinnellii
Penstemon grinnellii Eastw.	Grinnell's penstemon	Blue/violet flowers of Penstemon grinnellii
Penstemon guadalupensis A.Heller	Guadalupe penstemon	Pale/white flowers of Penstemon guadalupensis
Penstemon hallii A.Gray	Hall's penstemon	Blue/violet flowers of Penstemon hallii
Penstemon harbourii A.Gray	scree penstemon	Blue/violet flowers of Penstemon harbourii
Penstemon harringtonii Penland	Harrington's penstemon	Blue/violet flowers of Penstemon harringtonii
Penstemon hartwegii Benth.	Hartweg's penstemon	Red/orange flowers of Penstemon hartwegii
Penstemon havardii A.Gray	Big Bend penstemon	
Penstemon haydenii S.Watson ex J.M.Coult.	blowout penstemon	Blue/violet flowers of Penstemon haydenii
Penstemon henricksonii Straw		
Penstemon hesperius M.E.Peck	tall western penstemon	Blue/violet flowers of Penstemon hesperius
Penstemon heterodoxus A.Gray	Sierra penstemon	Blue/violet flowers of Penstemon heterodoxus
Penstemon heterophyllus Lindl.	bunchleaf penstemon	Blue/violet flowers of Penstemon heterophyllus
Penstemon hidalgensis Straw		
Penstemon hirsutus (L.) Willd.	hairy penstemon	Blue/violet flowers of Penstemon hirsutus
Penstemon humilis Nutt. ex A.Gray	low penstemon	Blue/violet flowers of Penstemon humilis
Penstemon idahoensis N.D.Atwood & S.L.Welsh	Idaho penstemon	
Penstemon imberbis (Kunth) Trautv.		
Penstemon immanifestus N.H.Holmgren	Steptoe Valley penstemon	
Penstemon incertus Brandegee	Mojave penstemon	Blue/violet flowers of Penstemon incertus
Penstemon inflatus Crosswh.	inflated penstemon	Blue/violet flowers of Penstemon inflatus
Penstemon isophyllus B.L.Rob.	equal-leaved penstemon	Red/orange flowers of Penstemon isophyllus
Penstemon jamesii Benth.	James penstemon	Blue/violet flowers of Penstemon jamesii
Penstemon janishiae N.H.Holmgren	Antelope Valley beardtongue Janish's penstemon	Blue/violet flowers of Penstemon janishiae
Penstemon kingii S.Watson	King's penstemon	Blue/violet flowers of Penstemon kingii, a cluster of very dark purpble blooms with glandular hairs.
Penstemon kralii D.Estes		
Penstemon labrosus (A.Gray) Mast. ex Hook.f.	San Gabriel penstemon	Red/orange flowers of Penstemon labrosus
Penstemon laetus A.Gray	mountain blue penstemon	Blue/violet flowers of Penstemon laetus
Penstemon laevigatus Aiton	eastern smooth penstemon	Blue/violet flowers of Penstemon laevigatus
Penstemon laevis Pennell	southwestern penstemon	Blue/violet flowers of Penstemon laevis
Penstemon lanceolatus Benth.	lanceleaf penstemon	Red/orange flowers of Penstemon lanceolatus
Penstemon laricifolius Hook. & Arn.	larchleaf penstemon	Pink flowers of Penstemon laricifolius
Penstemon laxiflorus Pennell	nodding penstemon	Pale/white flowers of Penstemon laxiflorus
Penstemon laxus A.Nelson	tufted penstemon	
Penstemon leiophyllus Pennell	smoothleaf penstemon	Blue/violet flowers of Penstemon leiophyllus
Penstemon lemhiensis (D.D.Keck) D.D.Keck & Cronquist	Lemhi penstemon	Blue/violet flowers of Penstemon lemhiensis
Penstemon lentus Pennell	handsome penstemon	Blue/violet flowers of Penstemon lentus
Penstemon leonardii Rydb.	Leonard's penstemon	Blue/violet flowers of Penstemon leonardii
Penstemon leonensis Straw		Pink flowers of Penstemon leonensis
Penstemon linarioides A.Gray	creeping penstemon toadflax penstemon	Blue/violet flowers of Penstemon linarioides
Penstemon longiflorus (Pennell) S.L.Clark	longflower penstemon	
Penstemon luteus G.L.Nesom		
Penstemon lyallii (A.Gray) A.Gray	Lyall's penstemon	Pink flowers of Penstemon lyallii
Penstemon marcusii (D.D.Keck) N.H.Holmgren	Marcus' penstemon	Blue/violet flowers of Penstemon marcusii
Penstemon mensarum Pennell	Grand Mesa penstemon	Blue/violet flowers of Penstemon mensarum
Penstemon metcalfei Wooton & Standl.	Metcalfe's penstemon	
Penstemon miniatus Lindl.		Red/orange flowers of Penstemon miniatus
Penstemon miser A.Gray	Malheur penstemon	Blue/violet flowers buds of Penstemon miser
Penstemon moffatii Eastw.	Moffatt's penstemon	Blue/violet flowers of Penstemon moffatii
Penstemon mohinoranus Straw	Cerro Mohinora penstemon	
Penstemon monoensis A.Heller	Mono penstemon	Pink flowers of Penstemon monoensis
Penstemon montanus Greene	cordroot penstemon mountain penstemon	Blue/violet flowers of Penstemon montanus
Penstemon moriahensis N.H.Holmgren	Mount Moriah penstemon	
Penstemon mucronatus N.H.Holmgren	mucronate penstemon	Blue/violet flowers of Penstemon mucronatus
Penstemon multiflorus (Benth.) Chapm. ex Small	manyflower penstemon	Pale/white flowers of Penstemon multiflorus
Penstemon murrayanus Hook.	scarlet penstemon	Red/orange flowers of Penstemon murrayanus
Penstemon nanus D.D.Keck	dwarf penstemon	Blue/violet flowers of Penstemon nanus
Penstemon navajoa N.H.Holmgren	Navajo penstemon	
Penstemon neomexicanus Wooton & Standl.	New Mexican penstemon	Blue/violet flowers of Penstemon neomexicanus
Penstemon neotericus D.D.Keck	Plumas County penstemon	Blue/violet flowers of Penstemon neotericus
Penstemon newberryi A.Gray	mountain pride pride-of-the-mountains	Pink flowers of Penstemon newberryi
Penstemon nitidus Douglas ex Benth.	waxleaf penstemon	Blue/violet flowers of Penstemon nitidus
Penstemon nudiflorus A.Gray	Flagstaff penstemon	
Penstemon occiduus Straw		
Penstemon oklahomensis Pennell	Oklahoma penstemon	
Penstemon oliganthus Wooton & Standl.	Apache penstemon	Blue/violet flowers of Penstemon oliganthus
Penstemon ophianthus Pennell	coiled anther penstemon	Blue/violet flowers of Penstemon ophianthus
Penstemon osterhoutii Pennell	Osterhout's penstemon	Blue/violet flowers of Penstemon osterhoutii
Penstemon ovatus Douglas	eggleaf penstemon	Blue/violet flowers of Penstemon ovatus
Penstemon pachyphyllus A.Gray ex Rydb.	thickleaf penstemon	Blue/violet flowers of Penstemon pachyphyllus
Penstemon pahutensis N.H.Holmgren	Pahute penstemon Paiute penstemon	Blue/violet flowers of Penstemon pahutensis
Penstemon pallidus Small	pale penstemon	
Penstemon palmeri A.Gray	Palmer's penstemon Palmer penstemon	Blue/violet flowers of Penstemon palmeri
Penstemon papillatus J.T.Howell	Inyo penstemon	Blue/violet flowers of Penstemon papillatus
Penstemon parryi A.Gray	Gray Parry penstemon Parry's beardtongue	Pink flowers of Penstemon parryi
Penstemon parvulus (A.Gray) Krautter	Aquarius Plateau penstemon	Blue/violet flowers of Penstemon parvulus
Penstemon parvus Pennell	Aquarius Plateau penstemon	
Penstemon patens (M.E.Jones) N.H.Holmgren	Lone Pine penstemon Lone Pine beardtongue	Pink flowers of Penstemon patens
Penstemon payettensis A.Nelson & J.F.Macbr.	Payette penstemon	Blue/violet flowers of Penstemon payettensis
Penstemon paysoniorum D.D.Keck	Payson's penstemon	Blue/violet flowers of Penstemon paysoniorum
Penstemon peckii Pennell	Peck's penstemon	Pink flowers of Penstemon peckii
Penstemon penlandii W.A.Weber	Kremling penstemon Penland penstemon	Blue/violet flowers of Penstemon penlandii
Penstemon pennellianus D.D.Keck	Blue Mountain penstemon	Blue/violet flowers of Penstemon pennellianus
Penstemon perfoliatus Al.Brongn.		
Penstemon perpulcher A.Nelson	Minidoka penstemon	Blue/violet flowers of Penstemon perpulcher
Penstemon personatus D.D.Keck	closethroat penstemon	Blue/violet flowers of Penstemon personatus
Penstemon petiolatus Brandegee	crevice penstemon	Pink flowers of Penstemon petiolatus
Penstemon pinifolius Greene	pineleaf penstemon	Red/orange flowers of Penstemon pinifolius
Penstemon pinorum L.M.Shultz & J.S.Shultz	Pine Valley penstemon	
Penstemon plagapineus Straw	pine-land penstemon	
Penstemon platyphyllus Rydb.	broadleaf penstemon broadleaf beardtongue	Blue/violet flowers of Penstemon platyphyllus
Penstemon potosinus Straw	San Luis Potosi penstemon	
Penstemon pratensis Greene	western whiteflower penstemon	Pale/white flowers of Penstemon pratensis
Penstemon procerus Douglas ex Graham	littleflower penstemon pincushion beardtongue	Blue/violet flowers of Penstemon procerus
Penstemon pruinosus Douglas	Chelan penstemon	Blue/violet flowers of Penstemon pruinosus
Penstemon pseudoputus (Crosswh.) N.H.Holmgren	Kaibab penstemon	Blue/violet flowers of Penstemon pseudoputus
Penstemon pseudospectabilis M.E.Jones	desert penstemon	Pink flowers of Penstemon pseudospectabilis
Penstemon pudicus Reveal & Beatley	bashful penstemon Kawich Range beardtongue	Blue/violet flowers of Penstemon pudicus
Penstemon pumilus Nutt.	Salmon River penstemon	Blue/violet flowers of Penstemon pumilus
Penstemon punctatus Brandegee		
Penstemon purpusii Brandegee	Snow Mountain penstemon	Blue/violet flowers of Penstemon purpusii
Penstemon putus A.Nelson	Black River penstemon	
Penstemon radicosus A.Nelson	matroot penstemon	Blue/violet flowers of Penstemon radicosus
Penstemon rattanii A.Gray	Rattan's penstemon	Blue/violet flowers of Penstemon rattanii var. kleei
Penstemon reidmoranii Zacarías & A.Wolfe	Reid Moran's penstemon	
Penstemon retrorsus Payson	Adobe Hills penstemon	
Penstemon rhizomatosus N.H.Holmgren	Schell Creek penstemon	
Penstemon richardsonii Douglas ex Lindl.	cutleaf penstemon	Pink flowers of Penstemon richardsonii
Penstemon roezlii Regel	Roezl's penstemon	Blue/violet flowers of Penstemon roezlii
Penstemon roseus (Cerv. ex Sweet) G.Don	pinto penstemon	Red/orange flowers of Penstemon roseus
Penstemon rostriflorus Kellogg	beaked penstemon beakflowered penstemon	Red/orange flowers of Penstemon rostriflorus
Penstemon rotundifolius A.Gray	roundleaf penstemon	Red/orange flowers of Penstemon rotundifolius
Penstemon rubicundus D.D.Keck	Wassuck penstemon	Red/orange flowers of Penstemon rubicundus
Penstemon rupicola (Piper) Howell	rock penstemon	Pink flowers of Penstemon rupicola
Penstemon rydbergii A.Nelson	Rydberg's penstemon meadow penstemon	Blue/violet flowers of Penstemon rydbergii
Penstemon salmonensis N.H.Holmgren		
Penstemon saltarius Crosswh.		
Penstemon saxosorum Pennell	upland penstemon	Blue/violet flowers of Penstemon saxosorum
Penstemon scapoides D.D.Keck	pinyon penstemon	Blue/violet flowers of Penstemon scapoides
Penstemon scariosus Pennell	plateau penstemon	Blue/violet flowers of Penstemon scariosus
Penstemon schaffneri (Hemsl.) Straw	jarritos penstemon	
Penstemon secundiflorus Benth.	sidebells penstemon	Pink flowers of Penstemon secundiflorus
Penstemon seorsus (A.Nelson) D.D.Keck	shortlobe penstemon	Blue/violet flowers of Penstemon seorsus
Penstemon sepalulus A.Nelson	littlecup penstemon	Blue/violet flowers of Penstemon sepalulus
Penstemon serrulatus Menzies ex Sm.	Cascade penstemon	Blue/violet flowers of Penstemon serrulatus
Penstemon smallii A.Heller	Small's penstemon	Pink flowers of Penstemon smallii
Penstemon spatulatus Pennell	Wallowa penstemon	Blue/violet flowers of Penstemon spatulatus
Penstemon speciosus Douglas	royal penstemon	Blue/violet flowers of Penstemon speciosus
Penstemon spectabilis Thurb. ex A.Gray	showy penstemon	Blue/violet flowers of Penstemon spectabilis
Penstemon stenophyllus A.Gray	Sonoran penstemon	Blue/violet flowers of Penstemon stenophyllus
Penstemon stephensii Brandegee	Stephens' penstemon	Pink flowers of Penstemon stephensii
Penstemon strictiformis Rydb.	Mancos penstemon stiff penstemon	Blue/violet flowers of Penstemon strictiformis
Penstemon strictus Benth.	Rocky Mountain penstemon	Blue/violet flowers of Penstemon strictus
Penstemon subglaber Rydb.	smooth penstemon	Blue/violet flowers of Penstemon subglaber
Penstemon subserratus Pennell	finetooth penstemon	Blue/violet flowers of Penstemon subserratus
Penstemon subulatus M.E.Jones	hackberry penstemon	Red/orange flowers of Penstemon subulatus
Penstemon sudans M.E.Jones	Susanville penstemon	Pale/white flowers of Penstemon sudans
Penstemon superbus A.Nelson	superb penstemon	Red/orange flowers of Penstemon superbus
Penstemon tenuiflorus Pennell	eastern whiteflower penstemon	Pale/white flowers of Penstemon tenuiflorus
Penstemon tenuifolius Benth.		
Penstemon tenuis Small	sharpsepal penstemon	Pink flowers of Penstemon tenuis
Penstemon tepicensis Straw		
Penstemon teucrioides Greene	grayleaf creeping penstemon germander penstemon	Blue/violet flowers of Penstemon teucrioides
Penstemon thompsoniae (A.Gray) Rydb.	Thompson's penstemon Thompson penstemon	Blue/violet flowers of Penstemon thompsoniae
Penstemon thurberi Torr.	Thurber's penstemon Thurber penstemon	Pink flowers of Penstemon thurberi
Penstemon tidestromii Pennell	Tidestrom's penstemon	Blue/violet flowers of Penstemon tidestromii
Penstemon tiehmii N.H.Holmgren	Tiehm's penstemon	
Penstemon tracyi D.D.Keck	Trinity penstemon	Pink flowers of Penstemon tracyi
Penstemon triflorus A.Heller	Heller's penstemon	Pink flowers of Penstemon triflorus
Penstemon triphyllus Douglas	Riggin's penstemon	Illustration of Penstemon triflorus
Penstemon tubaeflorus Nutt.	white wand penstemon	Pale/white flowers of Penstemon tubaeflorus
Penstemon uintahensis Pennell	Uinta Mountain penstemon	Blue/violet flowers of Penstemon uintahensis
Penstemon utahensis Eastw.	Utah penstemon	Red/orange flowers of Penstemon utahensis
Penstemon venustus Douglas	Venus penstemon	Blue/violet flowers of Penstemon venustus
Penstemon virens Pennell ex Rydb.	blue mist penstemon	Blue/violet flowers of Penstemon virens
Penstemon virgatus A.Gray	upright blue penstemon	Blue/violet flowers of Penstemon virgatus
Penstemon vizcainensis Moran		
Penstemon vulcanellus Crosswh.		
Penstemon wardii A.Gray	Ward's penstemon	Blue/violet flowers of Penstemon wardii
Penstemon washingtonensis D.D.Keck	Washington penstemon	
Penstemon watsonii A.Gray	Watson penstemon	Blue/violet flowers of Penstemon watsonii
Penstemon wendtiorum B.L.Turner		
Penstemon whippleanus A.Gray	dark penstemon Whipple's penstemon	Blue/violet flowers of Penstemon whippleanus
Penstemon wilcoxii Rydb.	Wilcox's penstemon	Blue/violet flowers of Penstemon wilcoxii
Penstemon wislizeni (A.Gray) Straw		Red/orange flowers of Penstemon wislizeni
Penstemon wrightii Hook.	Wright's penstemon	Red/orange flowers of Penstemon wrightii
Penstemon xylus A.Nelson	Tushar Bluemat Penstemon	Blue/violet flowers of Penstemon xylus, one flower in side view at center, the tubular fused petals opening to the right the small blue-green round leaves of the plant to the left, the other flowers out of focus.
Penstemon yampaensis Penland	Yampa penstemon	Blue/violet flowers of Penstemon yampaensis

== Penstemon natural hybrids ==
As of 2024 these seven naturally occurring hybrids are valid, according to POWO. Two are considered valid species, according to WFO.

Scientific name Authority	Common names	Photo
Penstemon × crideri A.Nelson	Crider penstemon Crider's penstemon	
Penstemon × dubius Davidson	dubius penstemon	
Penstemon × jonesii Pennell; Penstemon jonesii Pennell	Jones' penstemon	Flower of Penstemon × jonesii
Penstemon × mirus A.Nelson		
Penstemon × moronensis Crosswh. Penstemon moronensis Crosswh.		
Penstemon × parishii A.Gray		Flowers of Penstemon × parishii
Penstemon × peirsonii Munz & I.M.Johnst.		

== Additional Penstemon species ==
These four species are listed as accepted by World Flora Online, but are not accepted by Plants of the World Online.

Scientific name Authority	Common names	Photo
Penstemon brevibarbatus Crosswhite		
Penstemon compactus (D.D.Keck) Crosswh.	compact penstemon	Blue/violet flowers of Penstemon compactus
Penstemon jaliscensis B.L.Rob.		
Penstemon minutifolius Straw		
