= P. caesius =

P. caesius may refer to:

- Penstemon caesius, the San Bernardino beardtongue, a plant species endemic to California, United States
- Praealticus caesius, a combtooth blenny species found in the western central Pacific Ocean

== See also ==
- Caesius (disambiguation)
