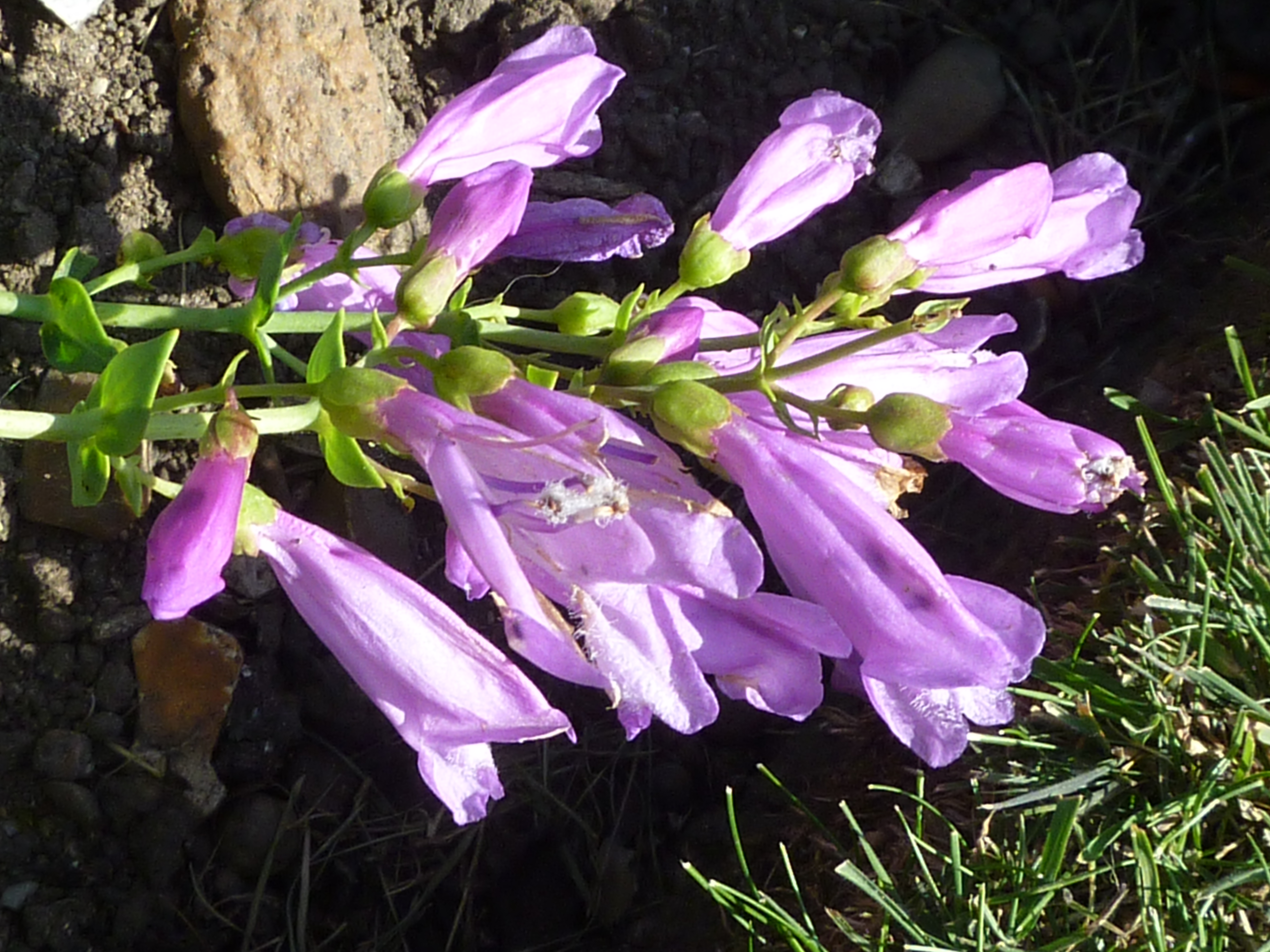

Conservation status
- Imperiled (NatureServe)

Scientific classification
- Kingdom: Plantae
- Clade: Tracheophytes
- Clade: Angiosperms
- Clade: Eudicots
- Clade: Asterids
- Order: Lamiales
- Family: Plantaginaceae
- Genus: Penstemon
- Species: P. barrettiae

Binomial name
- Penstemon barrettiae A.Gray

= Penstemon barrettiae =

Species of flowering plant

Penstemon barrettiae is a species of flowering plant in the plantain family known by the common name Barrett's beardtongue or Barrett's penstemon. It is endemic to a small part of the Pacific Northwest of North America.

This species is a perennial herb or shrub growing 20 to 40 centimeters tall. It is hairless and the leaves and inflorescence are waxy in texture. The oppositely arranged, blue-green leaves are stiff and leathery and have smooth or slightly serrated edges. The leaf pairs on the stem are up to 3.5 centimeters long and have clasping bases. The flowers are pink or light purple-tinged and tubular in shape. They are over 3 centimeters long and 1 centimeter wide at the lipped mouth. Flowering occurs in April through June.

Penstemon barrettiae generally grows on cliffs and rock outcrops where the soil is thin. It may anchor in rock cracks and crevices in talus. It is limited to a small area in southern Washington and northern Oregon, where it can be found in the Columbia River Gorge and the Klickitat River canyon. Threats to the species include poaching, road maintenance, herbicides, quarrying, logging, and recreational activity.

This species is named after Almeta Hodge Barrett, who discovered it sometime prior to 1886.

== See also ==
List of Penstemon species
