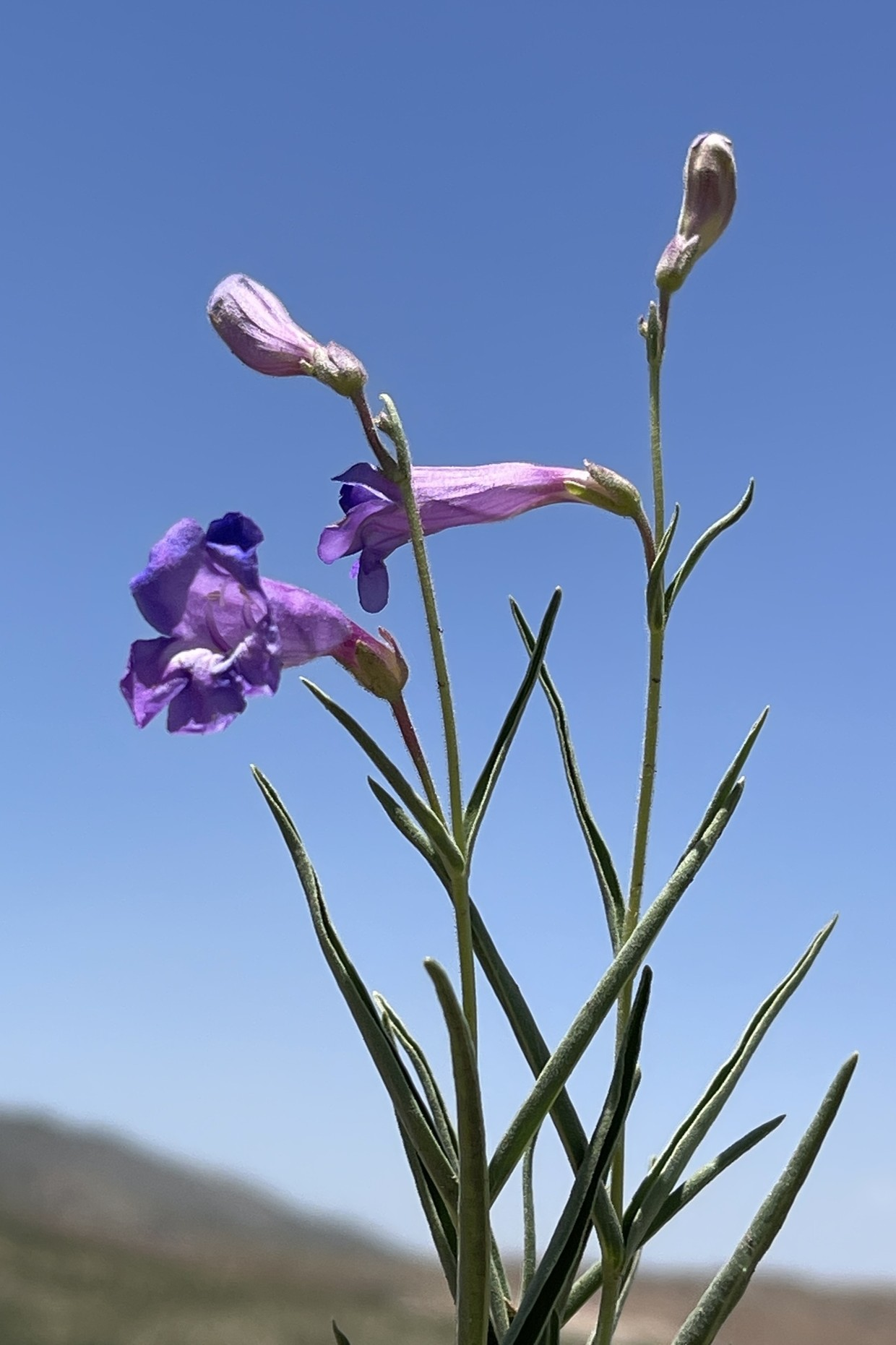
- Cochise County, Arizona

Conservation status
- Apparently Secure (NatureServe)

Scientific classification
- Kingdom: Plantae
- Clade: Embryophytes
- Clade: Tracheophytes
- Clade: Spermatophytes
- Clade: Angiosperms
- Clade: Eudicots
- Clade: Asterids
- Order: Lamiales
- Family: Plantaginaceae
- Genus: Penstemon
- Species: P. dasyphyllus

Binomial name
- Penstemon dasyphyllus A.Gray

Synonyms
- Penstemon stenophyllus var. dasyphyllus; Penstemon pringlei

= Penstemon dasyphyllus =

Plant species in the family

Penstemon dasyphyllus, commonly called grama grass penstmon or Gila penstemon, is a plant species from the southwestern United States and northern Mexico.

== Description ==
Grama grass penstmon has flowering stems that grow 20 to 50 centimeters (8–20 in) tall and are covered in stiff, backwards pointing hairs near their base and are puberulent or glandular-pubescent, covered in small, fine hairs or ones that are glandular, towards the top. The leaves are also puberulent or retrorsely hairy, covered in backwards pointing hairs, though sometimes only along the vein in the middle of the leaf and along the edges. The basal leaves and the lowest leaves on the stems measure 2.8–6.8 cm long, but just 3–9 millimeters wide. The basal leaves are absent when it beings to flower.

The flowers are blue or somewhat purple and covered in glandular hairs with the lower three lobes much larger than the upper two. The somewhat swollen fused petal tube measures 2.5–3.5 cm long. The flowers are four to eleven groups along the inflorescence and all face in one direction away from the stem. It can bloom as early as April or as late as September in its native habitat, but usually not later than July.

The fruit is a capsule that is 1.1–1.5 cm long and 0.7–0.9 cm wide.

It is very similar to Sonoran penstemon (Penstemon stenophyllus), another penstemon that grows on both sides of the border, other than the hairless leaves.

== Taxonomy ==
Penstemon dasyphyllus was scientifically described and named in 1859 by Asa Gray. It is classified as a Penstemon within the Plantaginaceae family. It has no botanical varieties, but was later described as a variety of Penstemon stenophyllus by Asa Gray in 1886. It has one other botanical synonym from 1888, Penstemon pringlei published by Sereno Watson.

=== Names ===
In Botanical Latin dasyphyllus means 'with hairy leaves'. Penstemon dasyphyllus is known by the common names grama grass penstmon and Gila penstemon.

== Range and habitat ==
This species is native to three US states and five states in Mexico. In the United States it grows in five western Texas counties Brewster, Crockett, Pecos, Presidio, and Terrell. In southwestern New Mexico it only is found in Hidalgo and Luna counties, but in southeastern Arizona it is known from Cochise, Gila, Pima, Pinal, and Santa Cruz. It grows in the Mexican states of Sonora, Chihuahua, Coahuila, Nuevo León, and San Luis Potosí.

It is found at elevations of 1,100–1,700 meters (3,600–5,600 ft) on rocky ridges and gravelly slopes in desert grasslands.

== See also ==
- List of Penstemon species
