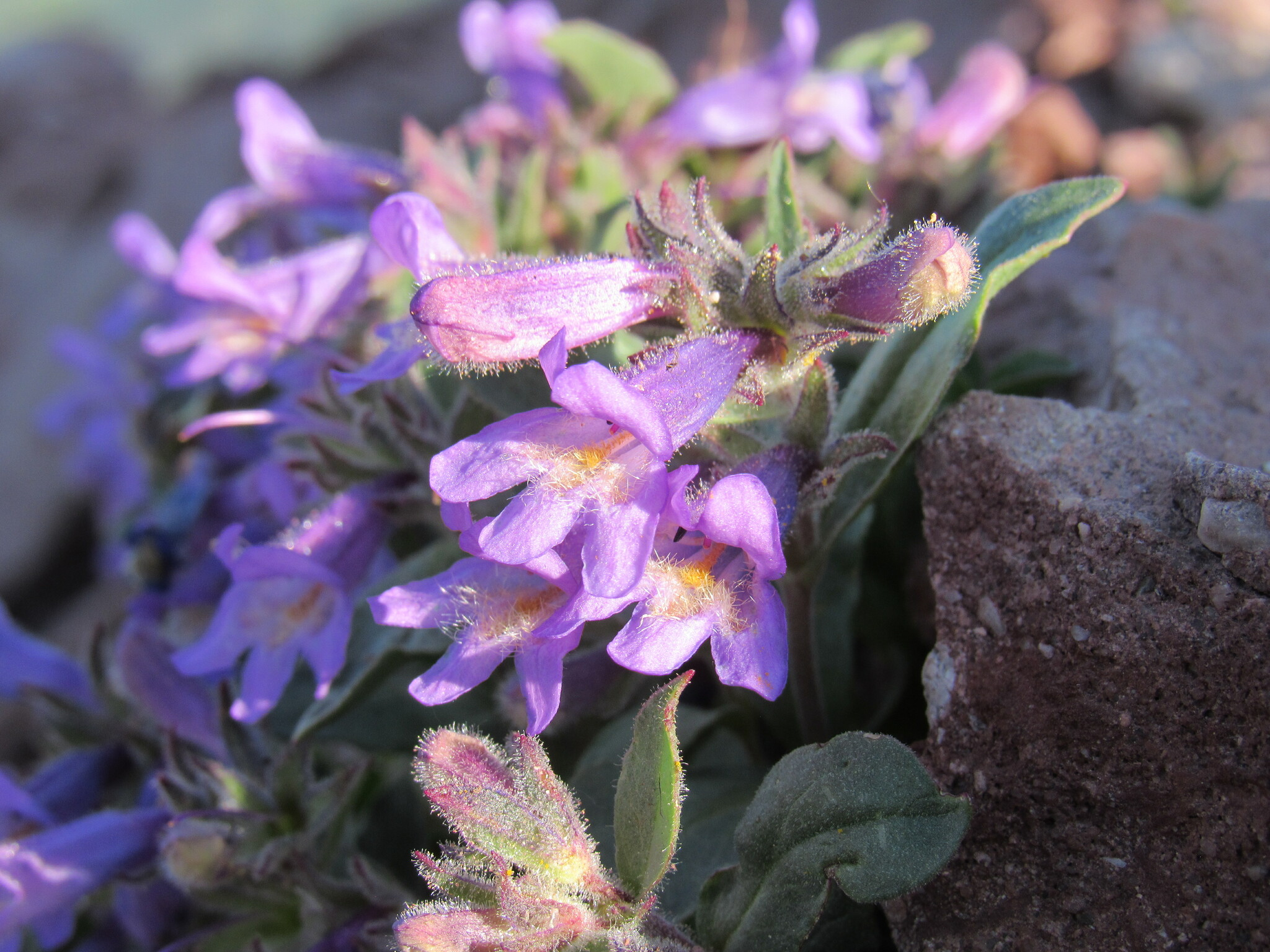
- In Gunnison County, Colorado

Conservation status
- Vulnerable (NatureServe)

Scientific classification
- Kingdom: Plantae
- Clade: Tracheophytes
- Clade: Angiosperms
- Clade: Eudicots
- Clade: Asterids
- Order: Lamiales
- Family: Plantaginaceae
- Genus: Penstemon
- Species: P. harbourii

Binomial name
- Penstemon harbourii A.Gray

= Penstemon harbourii =

Plant species in the family

Penstemon harbourii, commonly called scree penstemon, is a plant endemic to the high mountain ranges of Colorado.

== Description ==
Scree penstemon is a plant that at times forms a solid mat from its long rootstalks. The caudex is also rhizome-like. Its above ground stems do not have a surface coating of waxes and are covered in backwards pointing hairs. They grow along the ground, turning upwards at the end or grow upwards from the base, somewhat, reaching 4 to 18 centimeters (1.6 to 7.1 in) in length.

On each stem there will be two to four pairs of leaves that range from nearly hairless to hairy, but are not leathery in texture. They measure 7–28 millimeters long and 3–12 mm wide and are shaped like a spoon or reversed spearhead without teeth on the edges. The leaf tip can be rounded or pointed. Leaves lower down on the stems tend to be attached by short leaf stems while those further up attach directly to the main stem.

The inflorescence is the top 1–3 cm of the stems and is more or less secund, with all the flowers facing in one direction. Their flowers are pale blue, lilac, or reddish purple in color with glandular hairs on the outside.

== Taxonomy ==
Penstemon harbourii was scientifically described and named in 1862 by Asa Gray. It is classified as a species in the genus Penstemon within the wider family Plantaginaceae. It has no subspecies or synonyms.

=== Names ===
The species name harbourii was selected by Gray to honor plant collector Jared Patterson Harbour. Penstemon harbourii is known by the common name scree penstemon related to it growing on scree, the jumbled rocks found at the base of cliffs. Related to its scientific name it is also known as Harbour alpine penstemon and and Harbour's penstemon.

== Range and habitat ==
The scree penstemon is grows only on high mountains in the state of Colorado. It can be found at elevations of 3,200 to 4,200 meters (10,500 to 13,800 ft).

It is limited to rocky areas such as scree slopes, boulder fields, and alpine talus.
