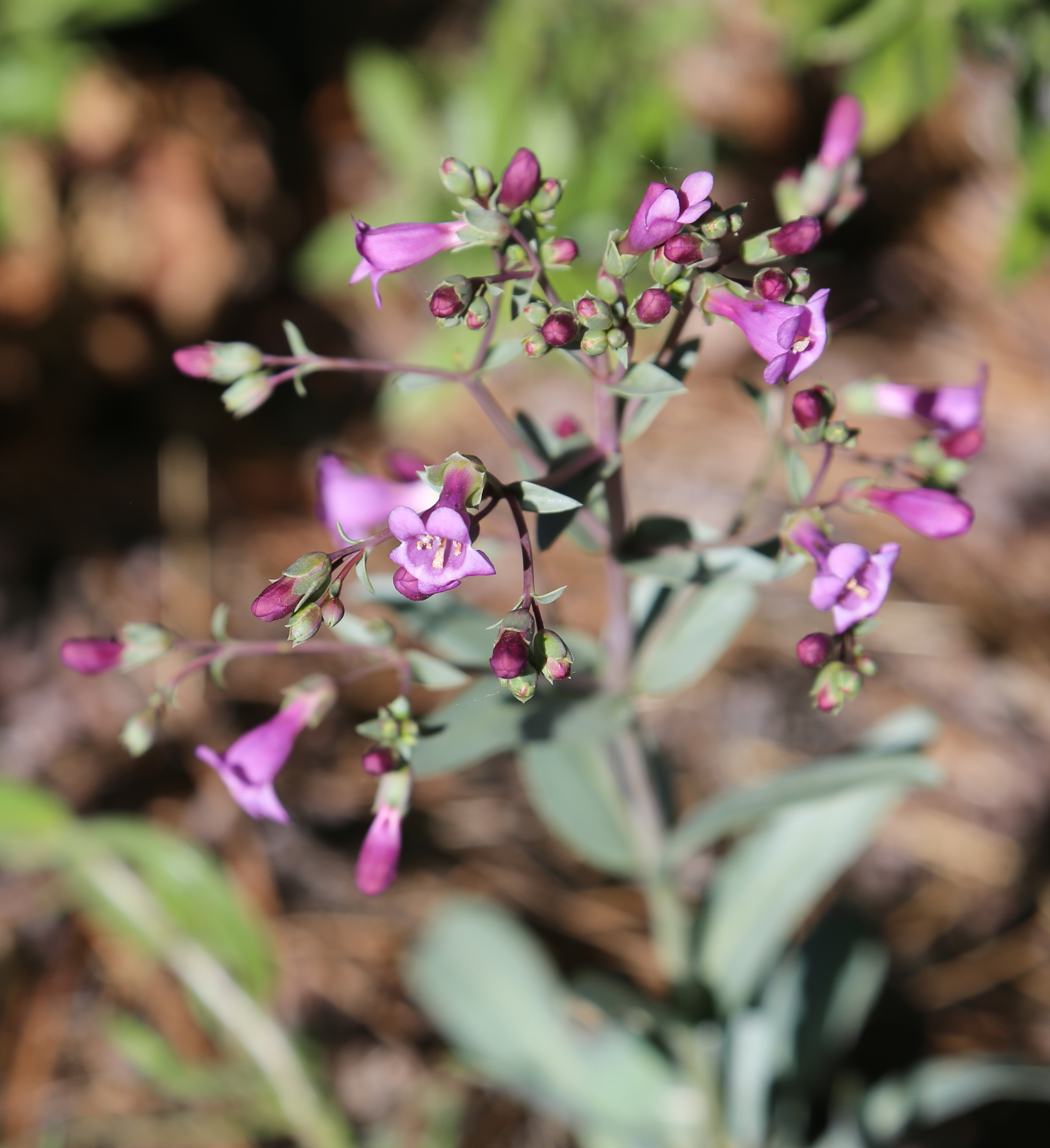

Conservation status
- Vulnerable (NatureServe)

Scientific classification
- Kingdom: Plantae
- Clade: Tracheophytes
- Clade: Angiosperms
- Clade: Eudicots
- Clade: Asterids
- Order: Lamiales
- Family: Plantaginaceae
- Genus: Penstemon
- Species: P. patens

Binomial name
- Penstemon patens (M.E.Jones) N.H.Holmgren

= Penstemon patens =

Species of flowering plant

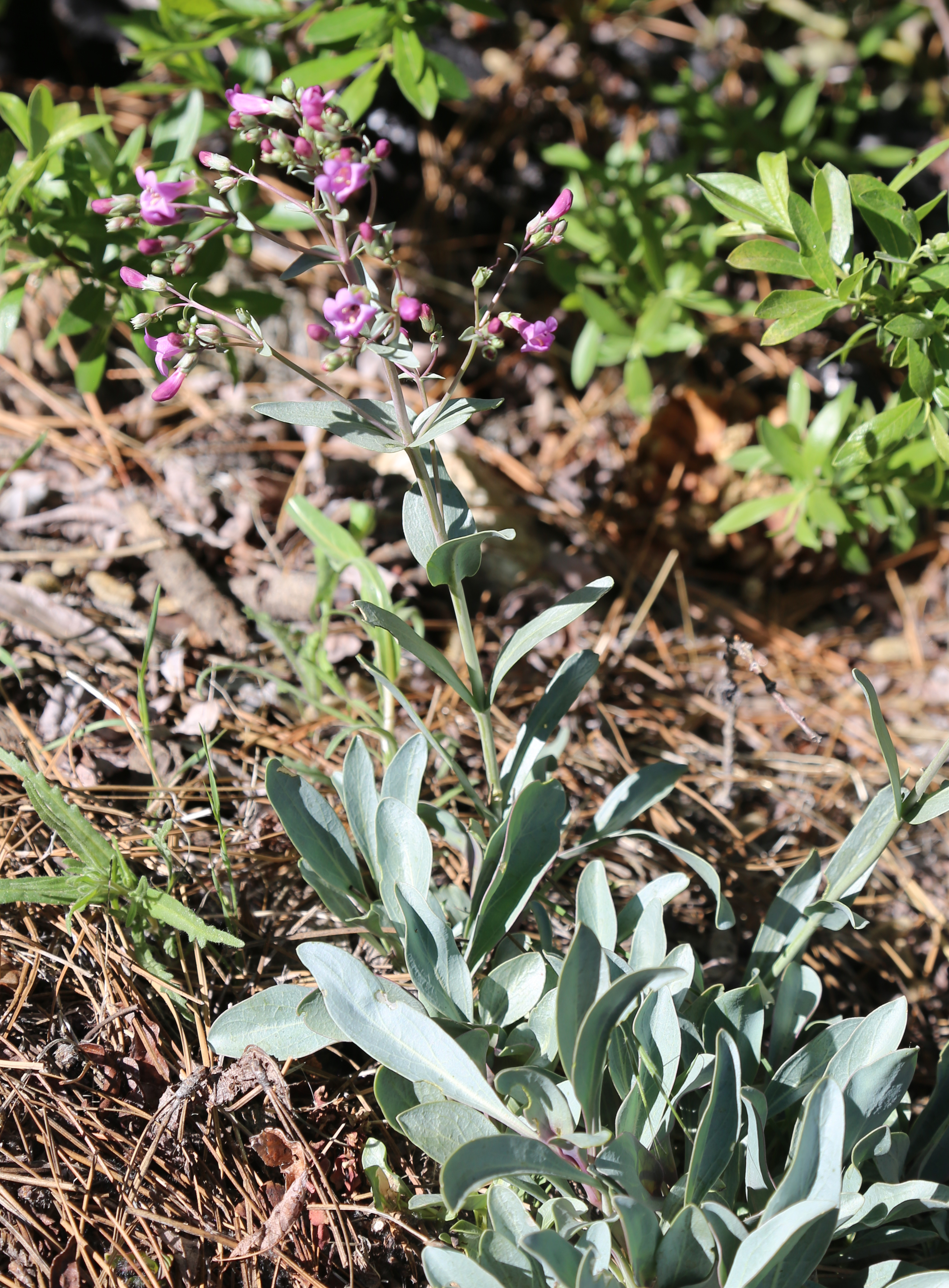
Penstemon patens plant

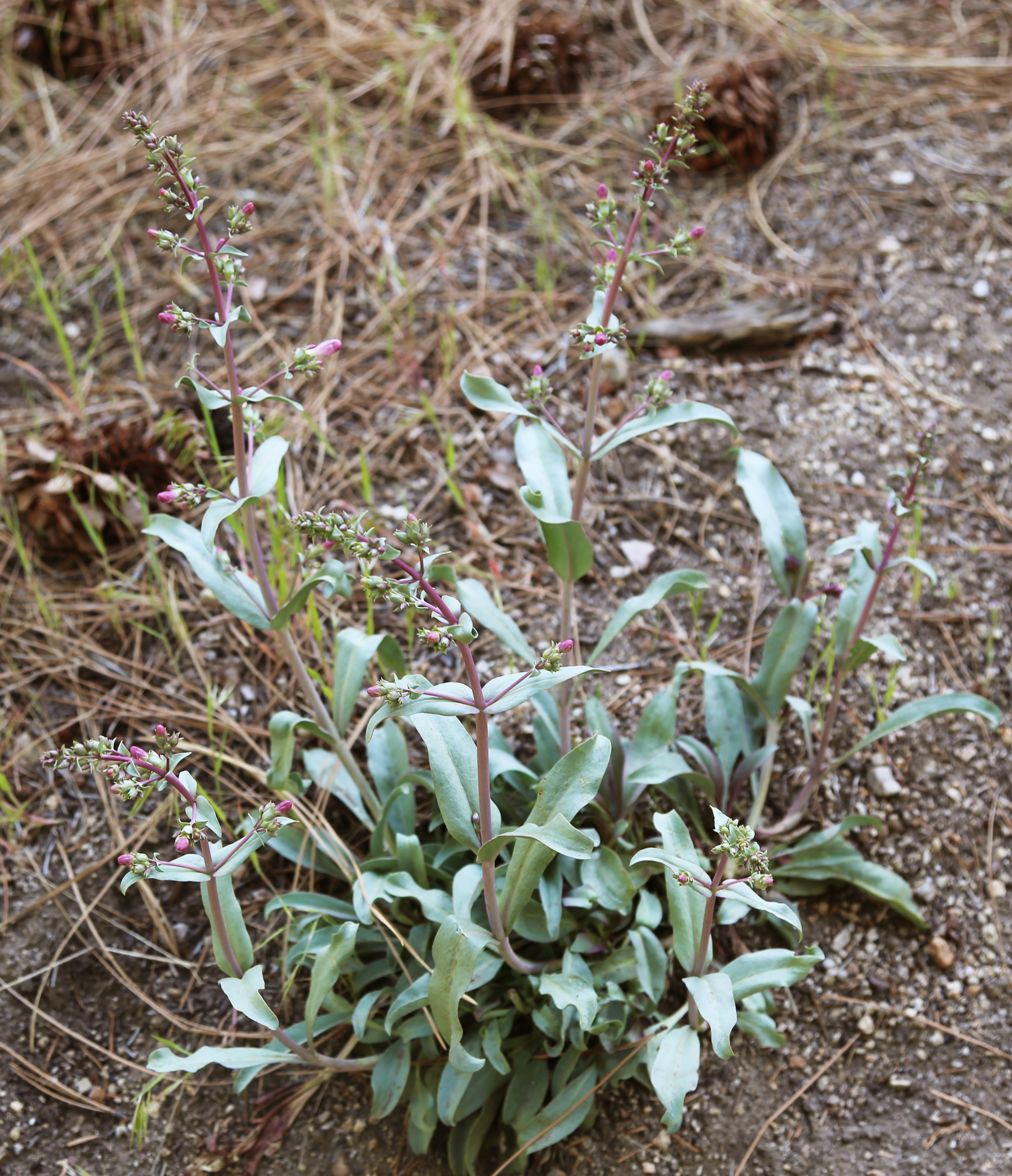
Penstemon patens in bud stage

Penstemon patens is a species of penstemon known by the common name Lone Pine beardtongue. It is native to the central Sierra Nevada of California and slopes and plateau to the east, its distribution extending just into Nevada. It grows in forest, woodland, and scrub habitat types. It is a perennial herb producing hairless, waxy stems up to about 40 centimeters tall. The thick, lance-shaped, gray-green, opposite leaves are up to 9 centimeters long and 2 wide. There are usually many leaves clustered around the base of the plant and smaller pairs higher on the stem. The inflorescence bears wide-mouthed tubular flowers up to 2 centimeters long with corollas in shades of lavender to magenta. The flower is mostly hairless except for the staminode which may have a coat of orange or yellowish hairs.
