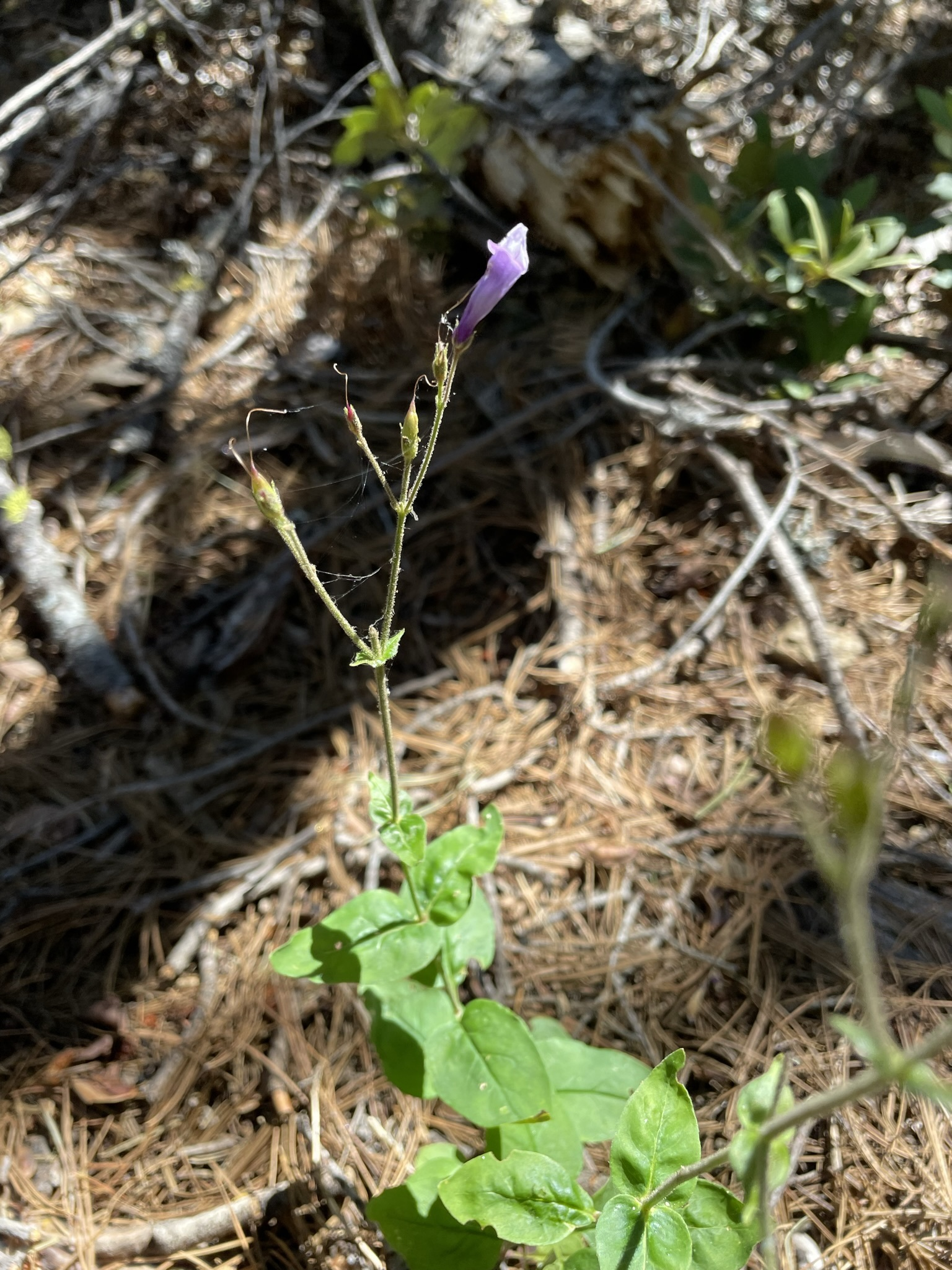

Conservation status
- Imperiled (NatureServe)

Scientific classification
- Kingdom: Plantae
- Clade: Tracheophytes
- Clade: Angiosperms
- Clade: Eudicots
- Clade: Asterids
- Order: Lamiales
- Family: Plantaginaceae
- Genus: Penstemon
- Species: P. personatus

Binomial name
- Penstemon personatus D.D.Keck

= Penstemon personatus =

Species of flowering plant

Penstemon personatus is an uncommon species of penstemon known by the common name closethroat beardtongue.

== Description ==
Penstemon personatus is a perennial herb producing mostly hairless, waxy stems up to about 50 centimeters tall. The leaves are located in opposite pairs along the stem, the lowermost scale-like. The largest leaves occur near the middle of the stem, are oval in shape and measure 3 to 5 centimeters long.

The glandular inflorescence bears tubular purple flowers around 2 centimeters long. Unlike most other penstemon flowers which have wide open mouths, the flower's upper and lower lips come together, closing the mouth. The inside of the mouth is very hairy, including the rough-haired staminode.

== Distribution ==
Penstemon personatus is endemic to the northernmost Sierra Nevada of California, where it is a member of the mountain forest flora.
