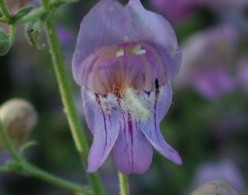

Conservation status
- Vulnerable (NatureServe)

Scientific classification
- Kingdom: Plantae
- Clade: Tracheophytes
- Clade: Angiosperms
- Clade: Eudicots
- Clade: Asterids
- Order: Lamiales
- Family: Plantaginaceae
- Genus: Penstemon
- Species: P. grinnellii

Binomial name
- Penstemon grinnellii Eastw.

= Penstemon grinnellii =

Species of flowering plant

Penstemon grinnellii is a species of penstemon known by the common name Grinnell's beardtongue. It is endemic to California, where it can be found in several mountain ranges from those around the San Francisco Bay Area to the Sierra Nevada to the Peninsular Ranges near the Mexican border. It is a perennial herb producing upright stems growing to 85 centimeters in maximum height. The leaves are oblong, up to 9 centimeters in length, folded lengthwise and curved backward. The glandular inflorescence produces several tubular purple-tinged white or violet flowers 1 to 2 centimeters long. The mouth of the flower has three lower lobes streaked with dark lines, a hairy throat and a long-haired, protruding staminode.
