= Penstemon metcalfei =

Conservation status
- Critically Imperiled (NatureServe)

Scientific classification
- Kingdom: Plantae
- Clade: Tracheophytes
- Clade: Angiosperms
- Clade: Eudicots
- Clade: Asterids
- Order: Lamiales
- Family: Plantaginaceae
- Genus: Penstemon
- Species: P. metcalfei

Binomial name
- Penstemon metcalfei Woot. & Standl.

Species of flowering plant

Penstemon metcalfei is a species of flowering plant in the plantain family known by the common name Metcalfe's beardtongue. It is endemic to New Mexico in the United States, where it occurs in the Black Range.

It grows on steep canyon slopes and cliffs in remote coniferous forest habitat.
