= Penstemon marcusii =

- In Emery County, Utah, past peak bloom

Conservation status
- Imperiled (NatureServe)

Scientific classification
- Kingdom: Plantae
- Clade: Tracheophytes
- Clade: Angiosperms
- Clade: Eudicots
- Clade: Asterids
- Order: Lamiales
- Family: Plantaginaceae
- Genus: Penstemon
- Species: P. marcusii

Binomial name
- Penstemon marcusii (D.D.Keck) N.H.Holmgren

Synonyms
- Penstemon moffatii subsp. marcusii D.D.Keck; Penstemon pseudohumilis M.E.Jones

Species of flowering plant

Penstemon marcusii is a species of plant in the genus Penstemon. Its common name is Marcus Jones' penstemon or Marcus' penstemon. It grows only in the Navajo Basin of Carbon and Emery Counties in Utah, often in Mancos Shale.

This plant grows to about 8 inches tall with blue to violet flowers over a basal mat of spoon-shaped leaves. Its most diagnostic characteristics are the anthers and pistil, which are included deeply in the corolla. Unusual among other penstemon, Marcus' Penstemon may have evolved towards Lepidopteran pollination.
