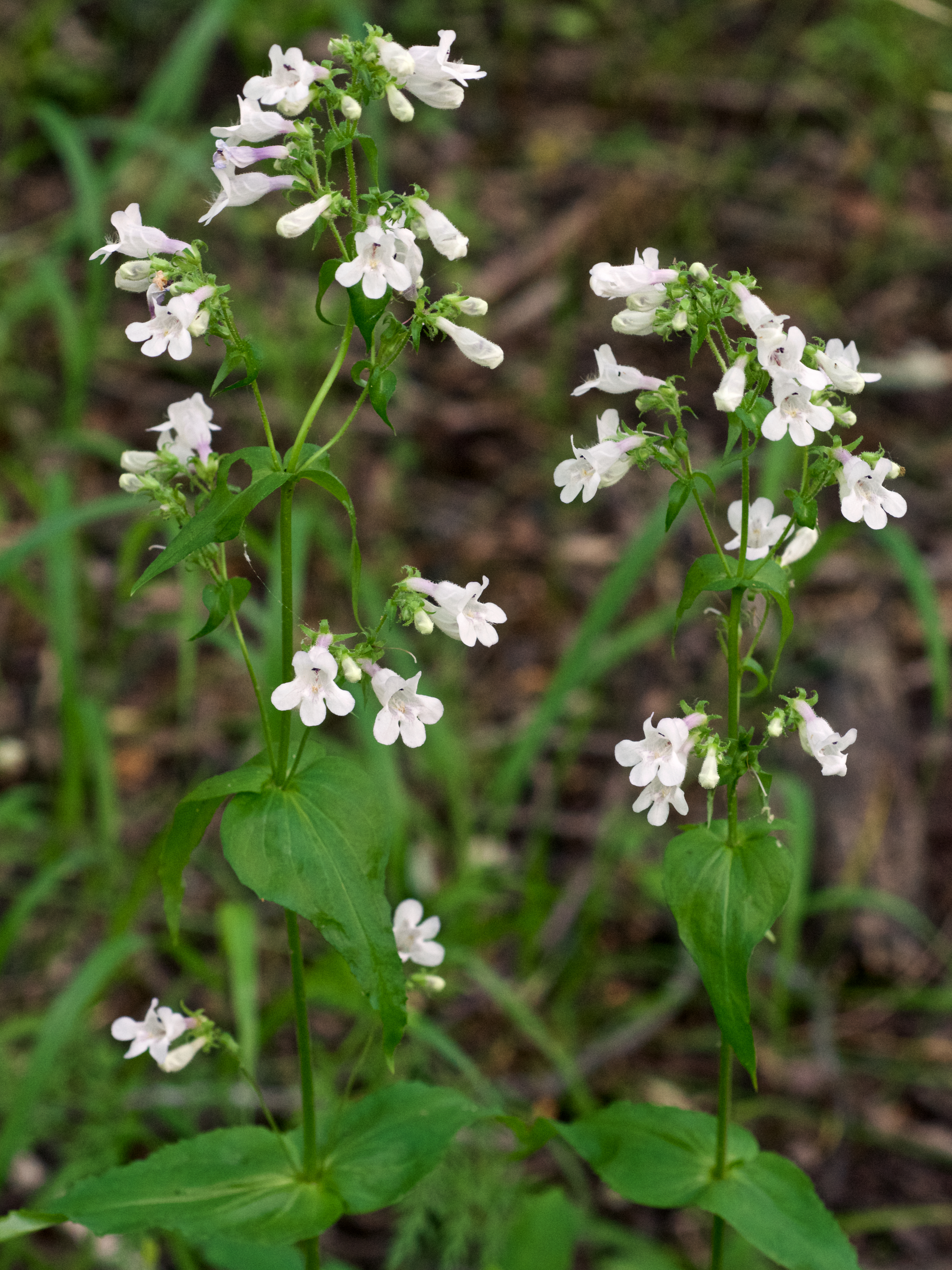

Conservation status
- Apparently Secure (NatureServe)

Scientific classification
- Kingdom: Plantae
- Clade: Tracheophytes
- Clade: Angiosperms
- Clade: Eudicots
- Clade: Asterids
- Order: Lamiales
- Family: Plantaginaceae
- Genus: Penstemon
- Species: P. tenuis

Binomial name
- Penstemon tenuis Small

= Penstemon tenuis =

Species of flowering plant

Penstemon tenuis is a species of flowering plant in the plantain family known by the common names sharpsepal beardtongue and gulf coast beardtongue. It is endemic to Texas, Louisiana, Mississippi, and Arkansas in the United States where it is found in open, damp areas in alluvial soil. It typically flowers from early April into early June.

== Description ==
Penstemon tenuis is a perennial herb with erect, slender stems that can grow upwards of 3 ft (0.91 m) tall. The lanceolate leaves grow opposite and are 4.75 in (121 mm) long and 1 in (25 mm) wide. The leaves have pointed tips and toothed or entire margins. Lower leaves are sessile and upper leaves are connate. The bell-shaped flowers grow in terminal racemes. The pink or lightly purple flowers have white throats. The flowers are 0.5 in (13 mm) wide and slightly longer, and are bilabiate. The upper lip of the flower has two erect lobes and the lower lip has three rounded lips.
