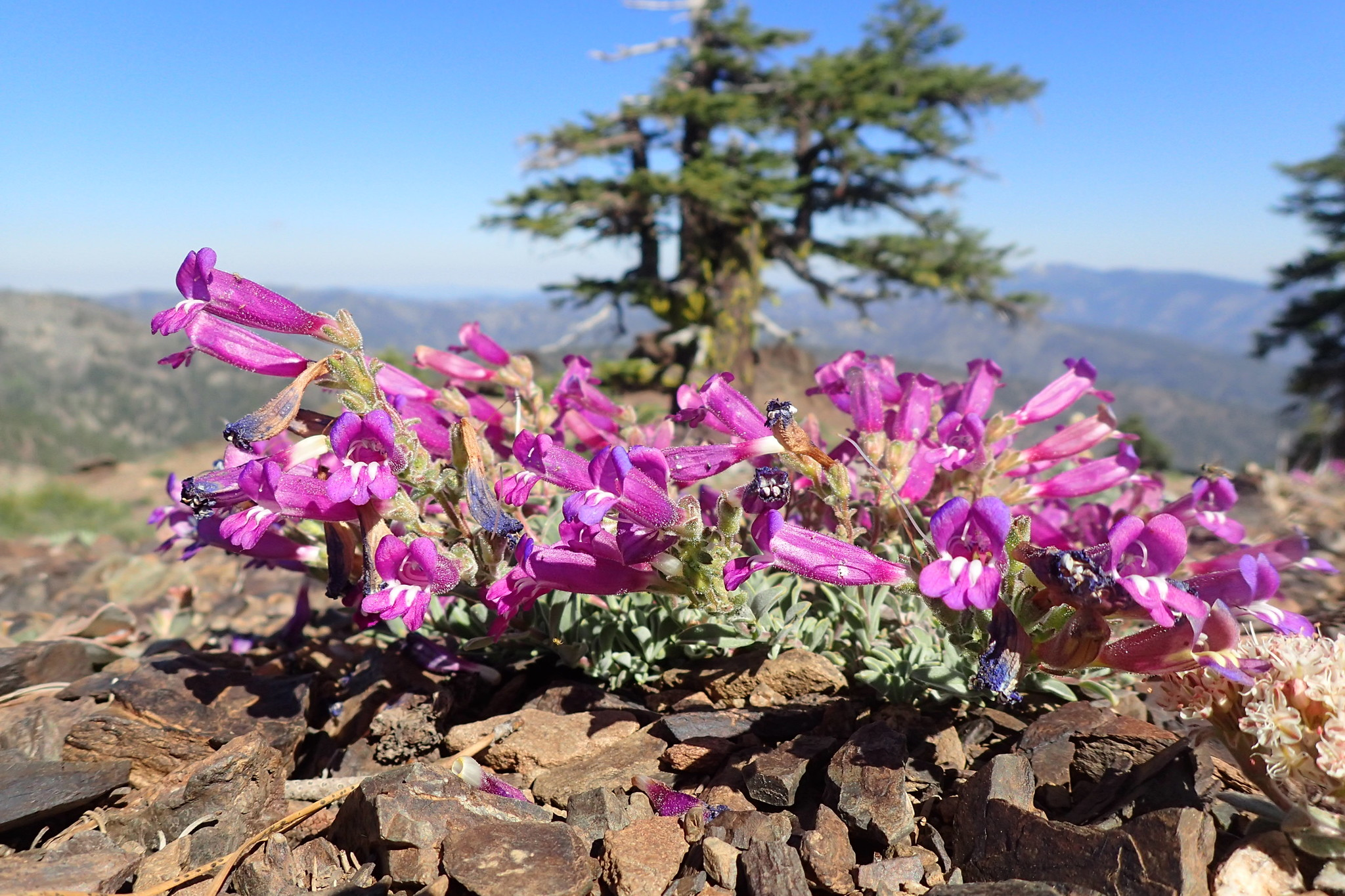
- Penstemon purpusii blooming in scree on ridge line west of Mt. Linn, Mendocino National Forest

Conservation status
- Vulnerable (NatureServe)

Scientific classification
- Kingdom: Plantae
- Clade: Tracheophytes
- Clade: Angiosperms
- Clade: Eudicots
- Clade: Asterids
- Order: Lamiales
- Family: Plantaginaceae
- Genus: Penstemon
- Species: P. purpusii

Binomial name
- Penstemon purpusii Brandeg.

= Penstemon purpusii =

Species of flowering plant

Penstemon purpusii is an uncommon species of penstemon known by the common name Snow Mountain beardtongue. It is endemic to northern California, where it is known only from the Klamath Mountains and northern peaks of the North Coast Ranges. It grows in rocky open and forested mountain habitat. It is a perennial herb growing to a maximum height of 20 centimeters from a woody base. The leaves are 1 to 3 centimeters long, widely lance-shaped and sometimes folded lengthwise. The glandular inflorescence bears tubular flowers up to 3 centimeters long. They are generally purple-blue in color, often with white throats.
