= Caesius =

Caesius, bluish-gray in Latin, may refer to:

- Caesius, the nomen of a prominent Roman family
- Philippus Caesius, Latinized name of Philipp von Zesen, a 17th-century Dutch writer
