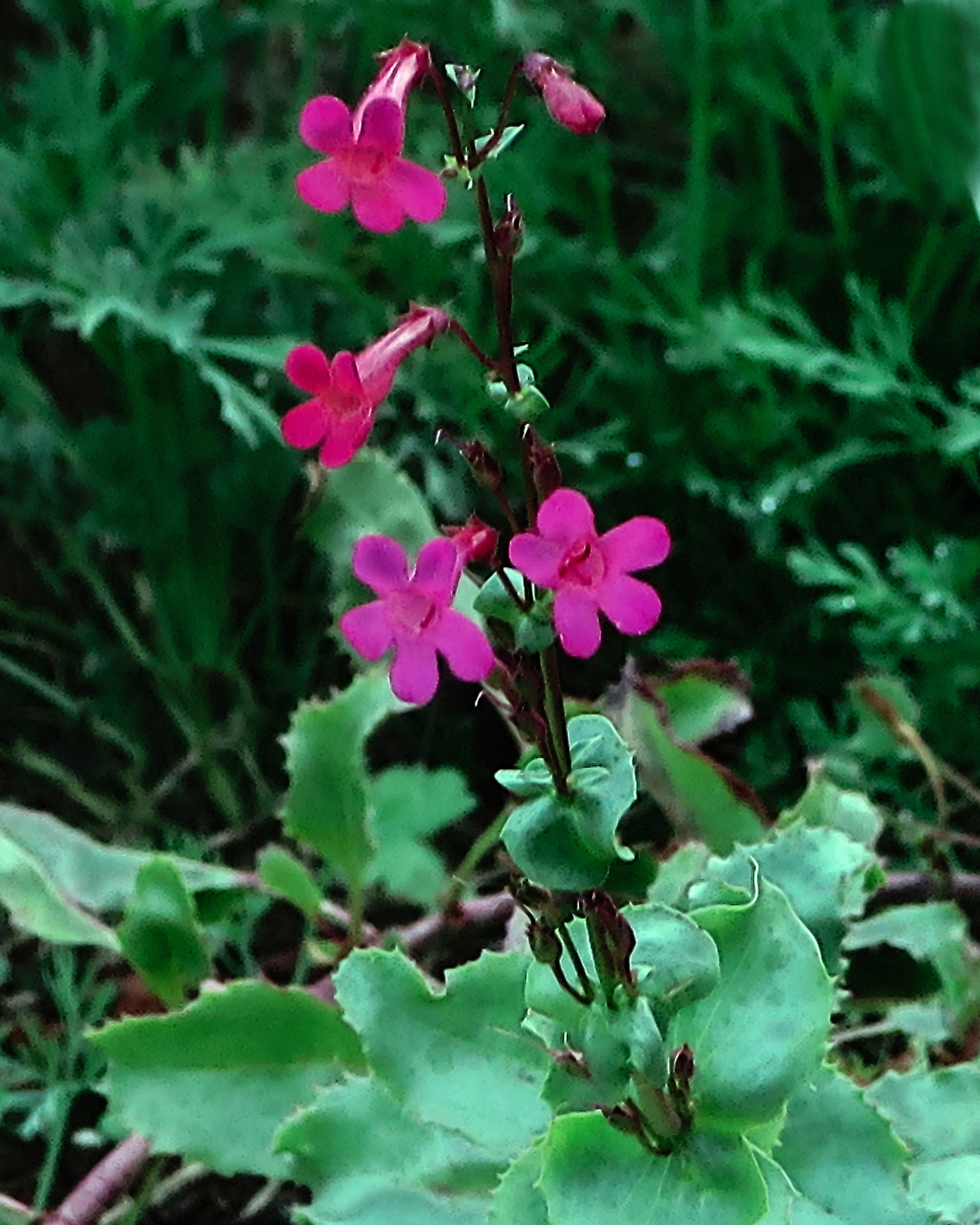

Conservation status
- Vulnerable (NatureServe)

Scientific classification
- Kingdom: Plantae
- Clade: Tracheophytes
- Clade: Angiosperms
- Clade: Eudicots
- Clade: Asterids
- Order: Lamiales
- Family: Plantaginaceae
- Genus: Penstemon
- Species: P. stephensii

Binomial name
- Penstemon stephensii Brandeg.

= Penstemon stephensii =

Species of flowering plant

Penstemon stephensii is an uncommon species of penstemon known by the common name Stephens' beardtongue, or Stephens' penstemon. It is endemic to California, where it is known only from the mountains of the Mojave Desert region. It grows in scrub, woodland, and sandy clearings, often on limestone substrates. It is an erect shrub which may reach 1.5 meters in height, with many leafy flowering stems. The thin leaves are oval with wide triangular tips and serrated edges. The oppositely arranged pairs fuse about the stem at the bases, sometimes forming a disc. The inflorescence bears glandular, wide-mouthed tubular flowers up to 2 centimeters long in shades of pink or purple. The plant is pollinated by hummingbirds.
