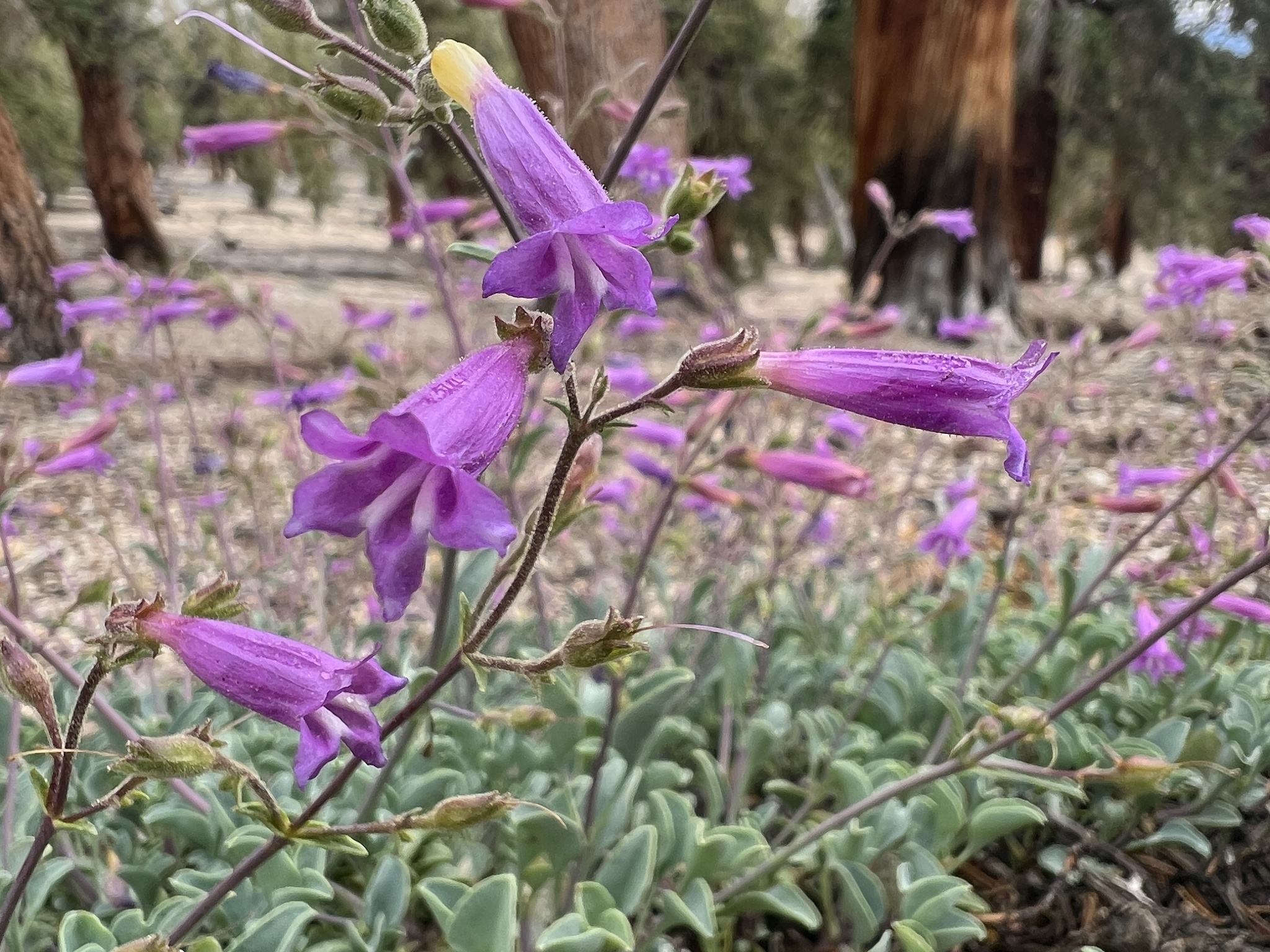
- In Sequoia & Kings Canyon National Parks

Conservation status
- Vulnerable (NatureServe)

Scientific classification
- Kingdom: Plantae
- Clade: Tracheophytes
- Clade: Angiosperms
- Clade: Eudicots
- Clade: Asterids
- Order: Lamiales
- Family: Plantaginaceae
- Genus: Penstemon
- Species: P. caesius

Binomial name
- Penstemon caesius A.Gray

= Penstemon caesius =

Plant species in the plantain family

Penstemon caesius, commonly known as the San Bernardino penstemon, is a low growing species of flowering plant. It is endemic to California, where it is known from the San Bernardino and San Gabriel Mountains, as well as the southern mountains of the Sierra Nevada. It is a member of the flora on rocky slopes and in coniferous forests and alpine habitat in the mountains.

== Description ==
It is a perennial plant with erect flowering stems, ones that grow more or less straight upwards from the base of the plant, that may be as much as 45 centimeters in height, but are more often 14 to 30 cm tall. It is a subshrub, a plant that is partially woody, with low, scrambling, or creeping branches at the base of the plant. The stems are hairless and sometimes waxy, but the inflorescence is covered in glandular hairs.

Most of the leaves are basal on the plant and are wide obovate, teardrop shaped narrow towards the base, to round in shape, with smooth edges. They are usually 1.5 to 5 centimeters long, but occasionally may be as little as 7 millimeters. They can be as narrow as 4 millimeters, but more frequently are 0.7 to 2 centimeters wide.

The inflorescence produces purple-blue tubular flowers roughly 2 centimeters long. The flower has a glandular outer surface, a coat of hairs inside, and a hairless staminode. The flowers of this penstemon are pollinated by bees of genus Osmia, which feed on their nectar.

== Taxonomy ==
Penstemon caesius was scientifically described and named by Asa Gray in 1883.

=== Names ===
Penstemon caesius is known by the common names of San Bernardino penstemon or San Bernardino beardtongue.

== Range and habitat ==
The San Bernardino penstemon is endemic to the state of California. There it can be found in the San Bernardino Mountains and San Gabriel Mountains north of Los Angeles. It also grows in higher parts of the Sierra Nevada. It is documented in Los Angeles, San Bernardino, and Kern counties to the south and Fresno, Inyo, and Tulare counties to the north. The elevation range for the species is 1800 to 3400 meters.

It can be found in open coniferous forests as well as open habitats above timberline on treeless rocky ridges.

=== Conservation ===
The conservation non-profit NatureServe has evaluated Penstemon caesius as vulnerable (G3) at the global level. However, this status has not been reviewed since 1998.

== See also ==
List of Penstemon species
