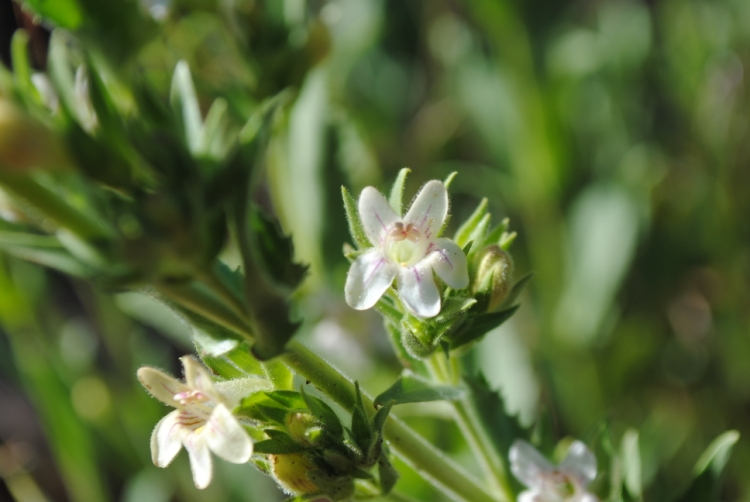

Conservation status
- Apparently Secure (NatureServe)

Scientific classification
- Kingdom: Plantae
- Clade: Tracheophytes
- Clade: Angiosperms
- Clade: Eudicots
- Clade: Asterids
- Order: Lamiales
- Family: Plantaginaceae
- Genus: Penstemon
- Species: P. sudans

Binomial name
- Penstemon sudans M.E.Jones

= Penstemon sudans =

Species of flowering plant

Penstemon sudans is a species of penstemon known by the common name Susanville beardtongue. It is native to northern Nevada and northeastern California, especially in the vicinity of Susanville, where it grows in scrub and forest habitat, often in rocky soils. It is a glandular, sticky perennial herb growing erect to a maximum height over half a meter. The toothed, oval leaves are 3 to 6 centimeters long. The inflorescence bears tubular flowers with wide mouths each divided into a double-lobed upper lip and a triple-lobed lower lip, the whole flower about a centimeter in length. It is cream-colored with dark-red lines.
