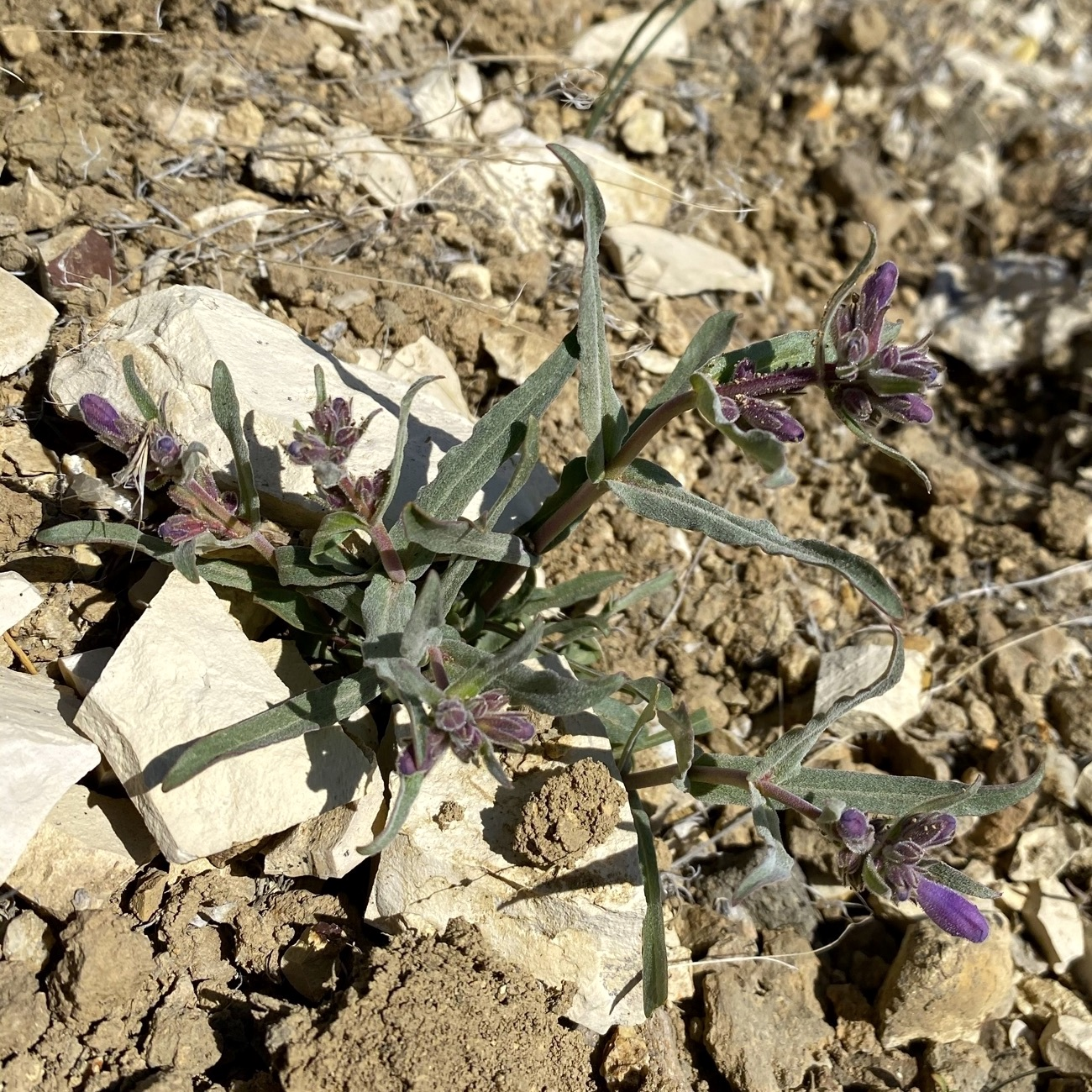

Scientific classification
- Kingdom: Plantae
- Clade: Embryophytes
- Clade: Tracheophytes
- Clade: Angiosperms
- Clade: Eudicots
- Clade: Asterids
- Order: Lamiales
- Family: Plantaginaceae
- Genus: Penstemon
- Species: P. miser

Binomial name
- Penstemon miser A.Gray

= Penstemon miser =

Species of flowering plant

Penstemon miser, commonly known as golden-tongue beardtongue or Malheur penstemon, is a species of perennial flowering plant in the Plantaginaceae family. It is native to North America.

This species is a perennial that can grow up to 40 cm (16 in) tall. The flowers, which bloom in May to June, are light blue to bluish purple or magenta in colour.

This species is found in Owyhee County, Idaho, southern Baker County and northern Malheur County, Oregon. It grows in clay soils, sagebrush shrublands, and pine-juniper woodlands, at 800–1,400 m (2,600–4,600 ft) elevations.
