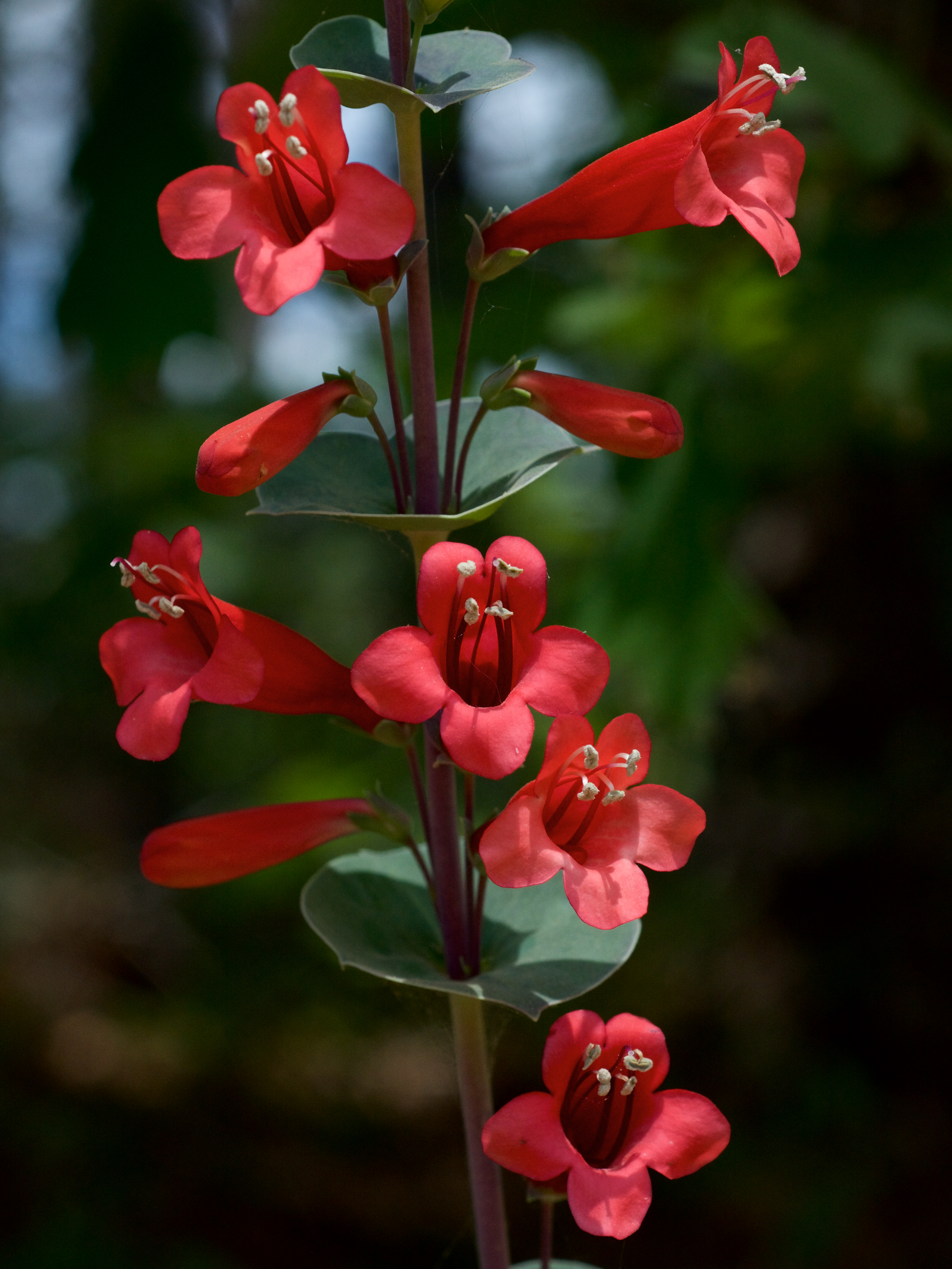

Conservation status
- Apparently Secure (NatureServe)

Scientific classification
- Kingdom: Plantae
- Clade: Tracheophytes
- Clade: Angiosperms
- Clade: Eudicots
- Clade: Asterids
- Order: Lamiales
- Family: Plantaginaceae
- Genus: Penstemon
- Species: P. murrayanus

Binomial name
- Penstemon murrayanus Hook.

= Penstemon murrayanus =

Species of flowering plant

Penstemon murrayanus is a species of flowering plant in the plantain family known by the common name scarlet beardtongue. It is endemic to Texas, Louisiana, Oklahoma, and Arkansas in the United States. The specific name murrayanuss honors Johann Andreas Murray, a Swedish botanist, and the common name "scarlet beardtongue" references the plant's scarlet flowers.
