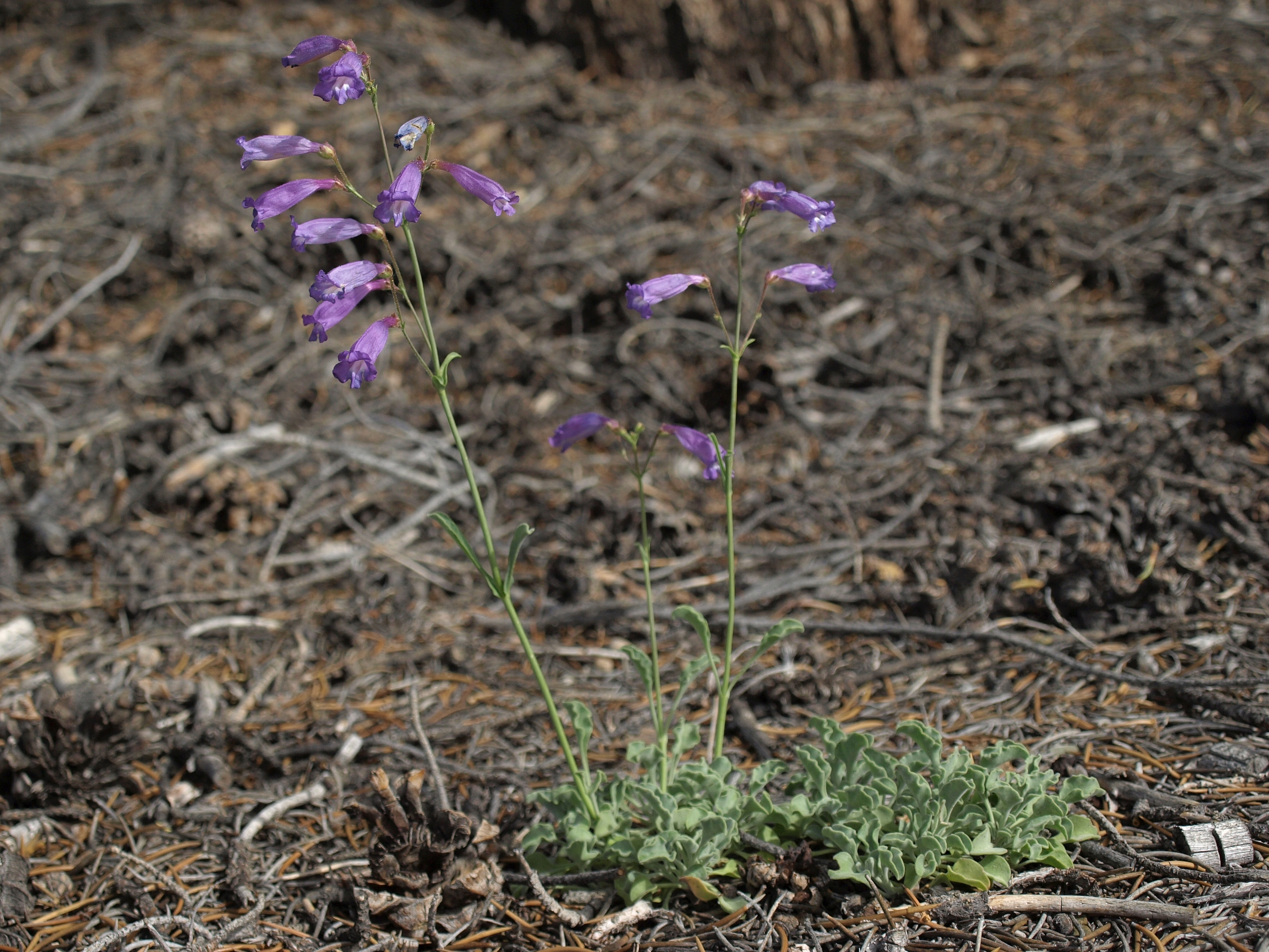

Conservation status
- Vulnerable (NatureServe)

Scientific classification
- Kingdom: Plantae
- Clade: Tracheophytes
- Clade: Angiosperms
- Clade: Eudicots
- Clade: Asterids
- Order: Lamiales
- Family: Plantaginaceae
- Genus: Penstemon
- Species: P. scapoides

Binomial name
- Penstemon scapoides D.D.Keck

= Penstemon scapoides =

Species of flowering plant

Penstemon scapoides is an uncommon species of penstemon known by the common name pinyon beardtongue. It is endemic to Inyo County, California, where it grows in the scrub, woodlands, and forests of the mountain ranges above the desert. It is a clumpy perennial herb forming a dense mat of oval to rounded leaves and erect flowering stems which may exceed half a meter in height. The leaves are pale green and coated densely in hairs. The inflorescence bears tubular flowers each up to 3.4 centimeters in length. The flowers are pale lavender to blue-purple and have yellowish hairs inside their mouths.
