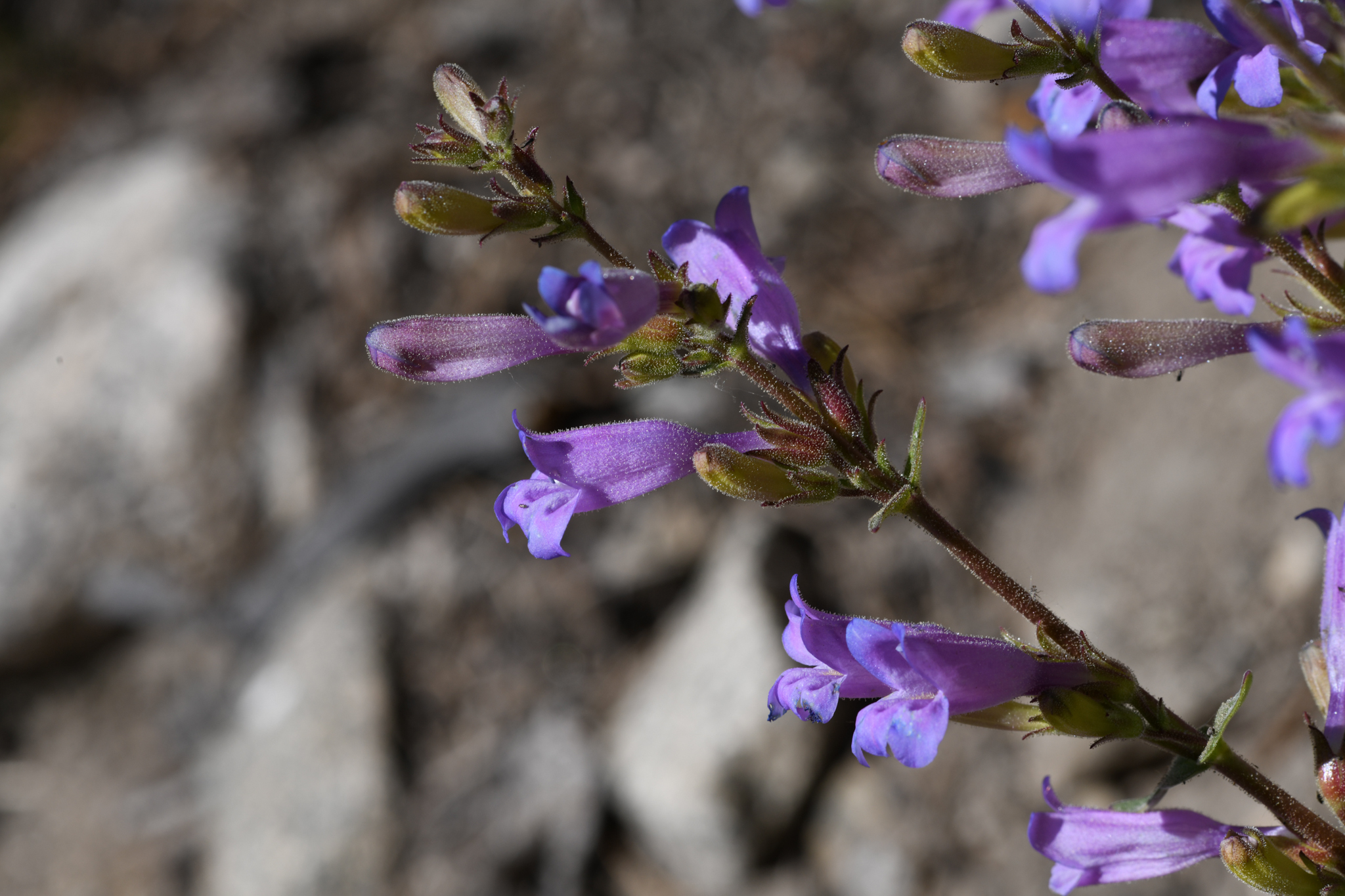
- Penstemon papillatus flower John Muir Wilderness

Conservation status
- Vulnerable (NatureServe)

Scientific classification
- Kingdom: Plantae
- Clade: Tracheophytes
- Clade: Angiosperms
- Clade: Eudicots
- Clade: Asterids
- Order: Lamiales
- Family: Plantaginaceae
- Genus: Penstemon
- Species: P. papillatus

Binomial name
- Penstemon papillatus J.T.Howell

= Penstemon papillatus =

Species of flowering plant

Penstemon papillatus is a species of penstemon known by the common name Inyo beardtongue.

The plant is endemic to California, where it is known only from the eastern Sierra Nevada and slopes to the east. It grows in rocky woodland and forest habitat types.

== Description ==
Penstemon papillatus is a gray-green, hairy perennial herb growing up to about 40 centimeters tall, becoming woody toward the base. The paired leaves are roughly oval in shape and fused about the stem.

The glandular inflorescence bears purple-blue flowers up to 3 centimeters long. The mouth of the flower is mostly hairless except for the yellow-haired staminode.
