= Penstemon neotericus =

Conservation status
- Vulnerable (NatureServe)

Scientific classification
- Kingdom: Plantae
- Clade: Tracheophytes
- Clade: Angiosperms
- Clade: Eudicots
- Clade: Asterids
- Order: Lamiales
- Family: Plantaginaceae
- Genus: Penstemon
- Species: P. neotericus

Binomial name
- Penstemon neotericus D.D.Keck

Species of flowering plant

Penstemon neotericus is a species of penstemon known by the common name Plumas County beardtongue. It is endemic to California, where it is known from the northern Sierra Nevada and adjacent southern peaks of the Cascade Range. It grows in forest, scrub, and other mountain habitat. It is a perennial herb growing erect to about 80 centimeters tall, becoming woody toward the base. The paired leaves are lance-shaped and nearly 9 centimeters in maximum length. The glandular inflorescence bears blue-purple or pinkish flowers up to 4 centimeters long. The flowers have white, mostly hairless mouths and hairless staminodes.
