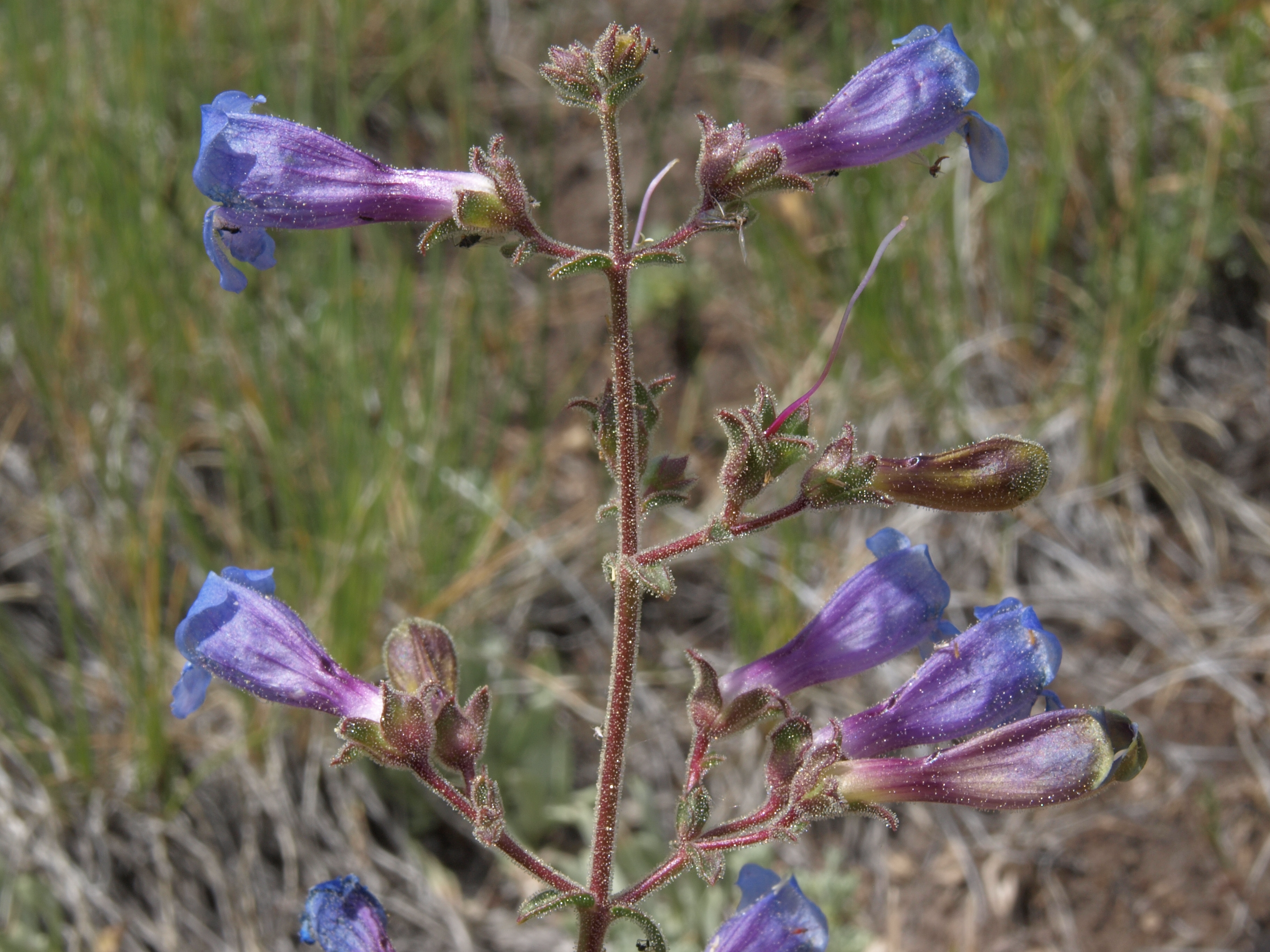

Scientific classification
- Kingdom: Plantae
- Clade: Tracheophytes
- Clade: Angiosperms
- Clade: Eudicots
- Clade: Asterids
- Order: Lamiales
- Family: Plantaginaceae
- Genus: Penstemon
- Species: P. roezlii

Binomial name
- Penstemon roezlii Regel

= Penstemon roezlii =

Species of flowering plant

Penstemon roezlii is a species of penstemon known by the common name Roezl's penstemon. It is native to Oregon, western Nevada, and adjacent sections of northern California, including the Klamath Mountains and Sierra Nevada, where it grows in sagebrush and forest habitat types. It is a hairy, erect perennial herb growing to a maximum height of 55 centimeters from a woody, branching base. The leaves are up to 7 centimeters long, linear to widely lance-shaped and often folded lengthwise. The glandular inflorescence bears wide-mouthed tubular flowers up to 2.2 centimeters long in shades of blue-purple. The flowers are mostly hairless except for thin glandular hairs on the outer surfaces.
