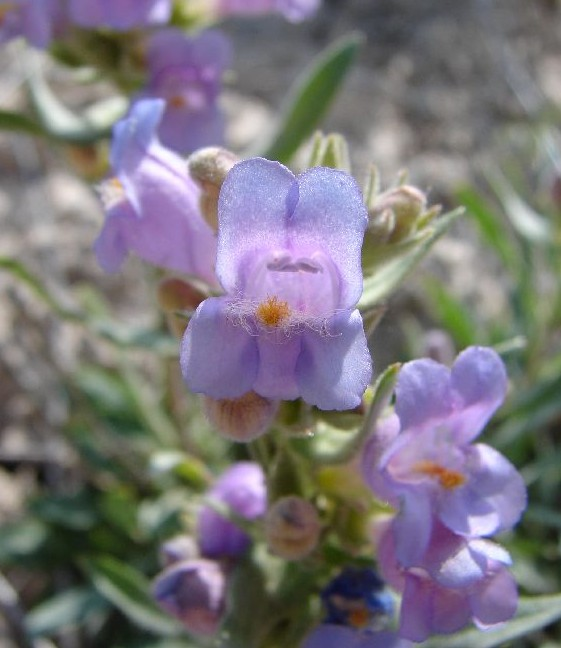

Conservation status
- Apparently Secure (NatureServe)

Scientific classification
- Kingdom: Plantae
- Clade: Tracheophytes
- Clade: Angiosperms
- Clade: Eudicots
- Clade: Asterids
- Order: Lamiales
- Family: Plantaginaceae
- Genus: Penstemon
- Species: P. janishiae

Binomial name
- Penstemon janishiae N.H.Holmgren

= Penstemon janishiae =

Species of flowering plant

Penstemon janishiae is a species of penstemon known by the common names Antelope Valley beardtongue and Janish's beardtongue. It is native to the northwestern United States in sections of Idaho, Oregon, Nevada and northwestern California, where it is a member of the flora in sagebrush, woodland, and pine forests. It is a perennial herb with several hairy upright stems reaching up to about 25 centimeters tall. The leaves are up to 6 centimeters long, many located around the base of the plant and several pairs along each stem. The inflorescence produces several wide-mouthed tubular flowers 2 to 3 centimeters long. Each hairy, glandular flower is pale purple to pinkish or bluish in color with a dark-lined, pouchlike throat. The mouth of the flower is hairy and the protruding staminode is coated in bright orange or yellow hairs.
