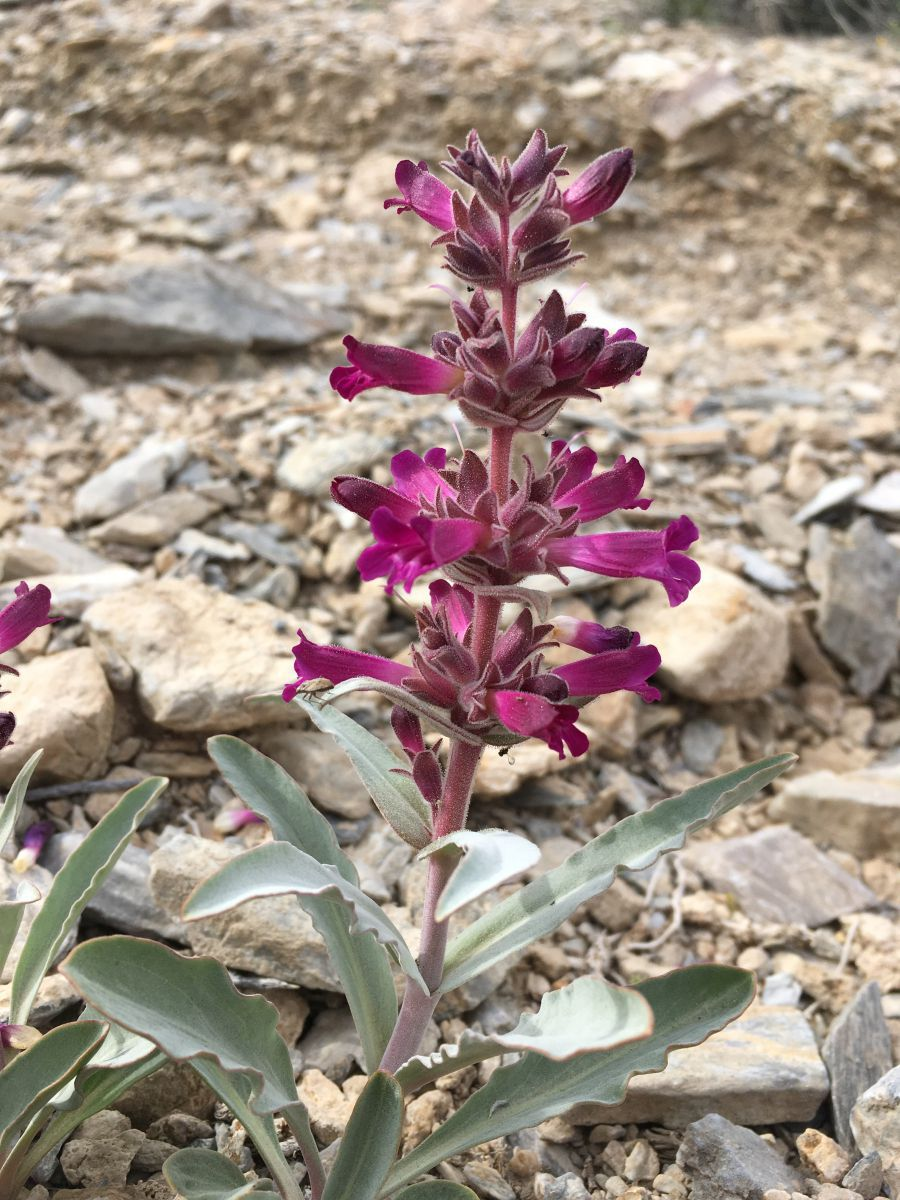

Conservation status
- Vulnerable (NatureServe)

Scientific classification
- Kingdom: Plantae
- Clade: Tracheophytes
- Clade: Angiosperms
- Clade: Eudicots
- Clade: Asterids
- Order: Lamiales
- Family: Plantaginaceae
- Genus: Penstemon
- Species: P. monoensis

Binomial name
- Penstemon monoensis A.Heller

= Penstemon monoensis =

Species of flowering plant

Penstemon monoensis is a species of penstemon known by the common name Mono penstemon. It is endemic to the White and Inyo Mountains of eastern California, where it grows in scrub, woodland, and sandy washes. It is a perennial herb growing erect to about 30 centimeters tall, gray-green in color from a dense coating of light hairs. The paired leaves are lance-shaped, sometimes toothed or wavy along the edges and up to 12 centimeters long. The glandular inflorescence bears cylindrical or funnel-shaped flowers in shades of bright to deep pink, measuring around 2 centimeters in length. The mouth of the flower may have a white or pale area on the floor with a patch of hairs, and the staminode is usually hairy.
