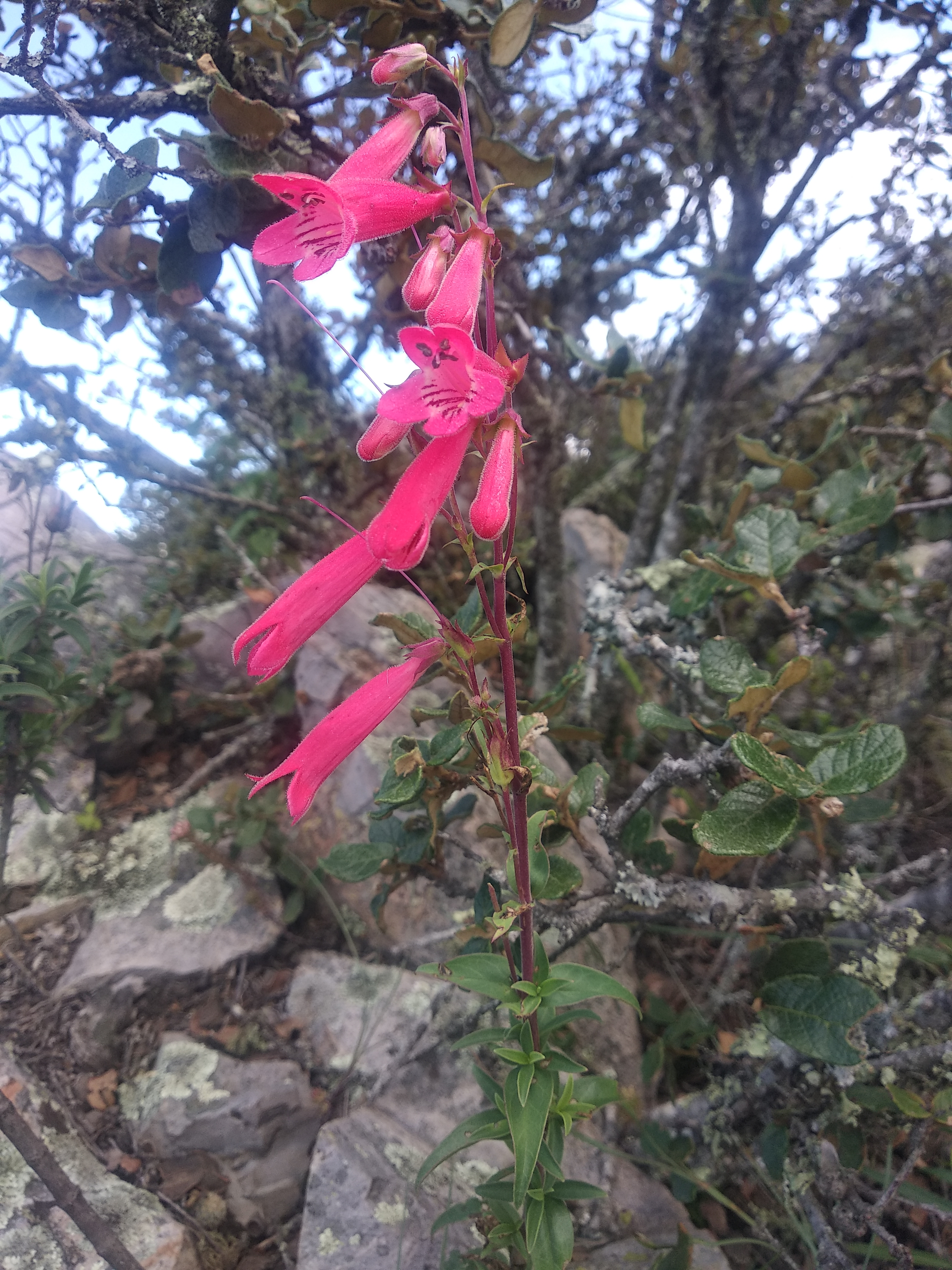

Scientific classification
- Kingdom: Plantae
- Clade: Tracheophytes
- Clade: Angiosperms
- Clade: Eudicots
- Clade: Asterids
- Order: Lamiales
- Family: Plantaginaceae
- Genus: Penstemon
- Species: P. isophyllus

Binomial name
- Penstemon isophyllus B.L.Rob.

= Penstemon isophyllus =

Species of flowering plant

Penstemon isophyllus, the equal-leaved penstemon, is a species of flowering plant in the plantain family Plantaginaceae, native to Mexico.

It is a recipient of the Royal Horticultural Society's Award of Garden Merit.

Growing to 70 cm (28 in), it is a woody evergreen perennial with reddish pink tubular flowers. Although hardy to −10 °C (14 °F), it benefits from some winter protection in colder areas.

The Latin specific epithet isophyllus means "with leaves all of the same size".
