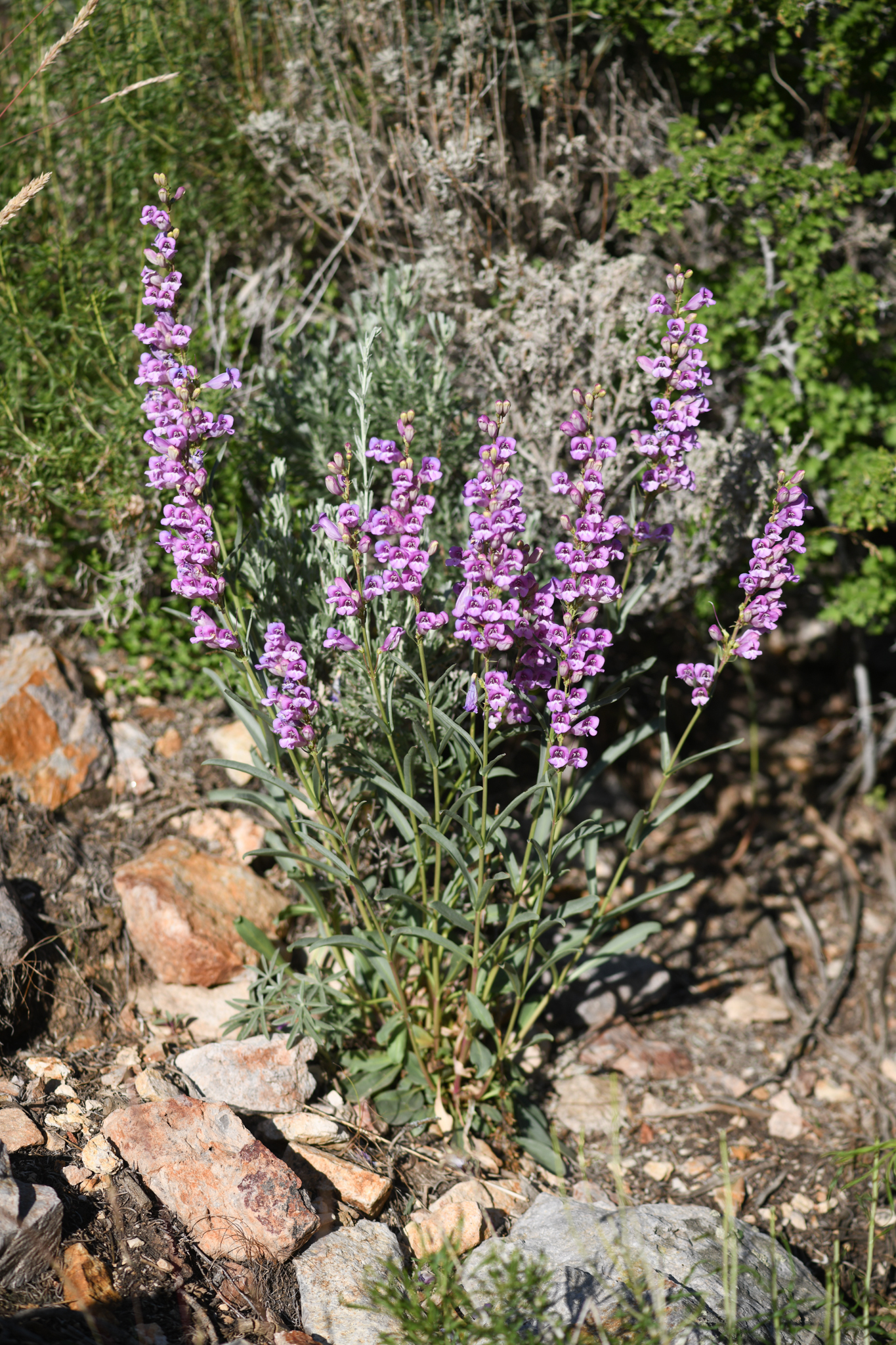

Conservation status
- Vulnerable (NatureServe)

Scientific classification
- Kingdom: Plantae
- Clade: Tracheophytes
- Clade: Angiosperms
- Clade: Eudicots
- Clade: Asterids
- Order: Lamiales
- Family: Plantaginaceae
- Genus: Penstemon
- Species: P. pahutensis

Binomial name
- Penstemon pahutensis N.H.Holmgren

= Penstemon pahutensis =

Species of flowering plant

Penstemon pahutensis is a species of penstemon known by the common name Pahute Mesa beardtongue, or simply Pahute beardtongue. It is native to the desert hills and mountains of southern Nevada, including the Pahute Mesa for which it is named. It can also be found in a few areas over the border in California. It is a perennial herb growing up to 35 centimeters (14 in) tall. The paired, narrow leaves are linear to lance-shaped and up to 10 centimeters (4 in) long. The inflorescence bears blue-purple flowers up to 3 centimeters (1 1/4 in) long. The inside of the wide mouth of the flower is lined with white or yellow hairs, and the staminode is coated in yellow hairs.
