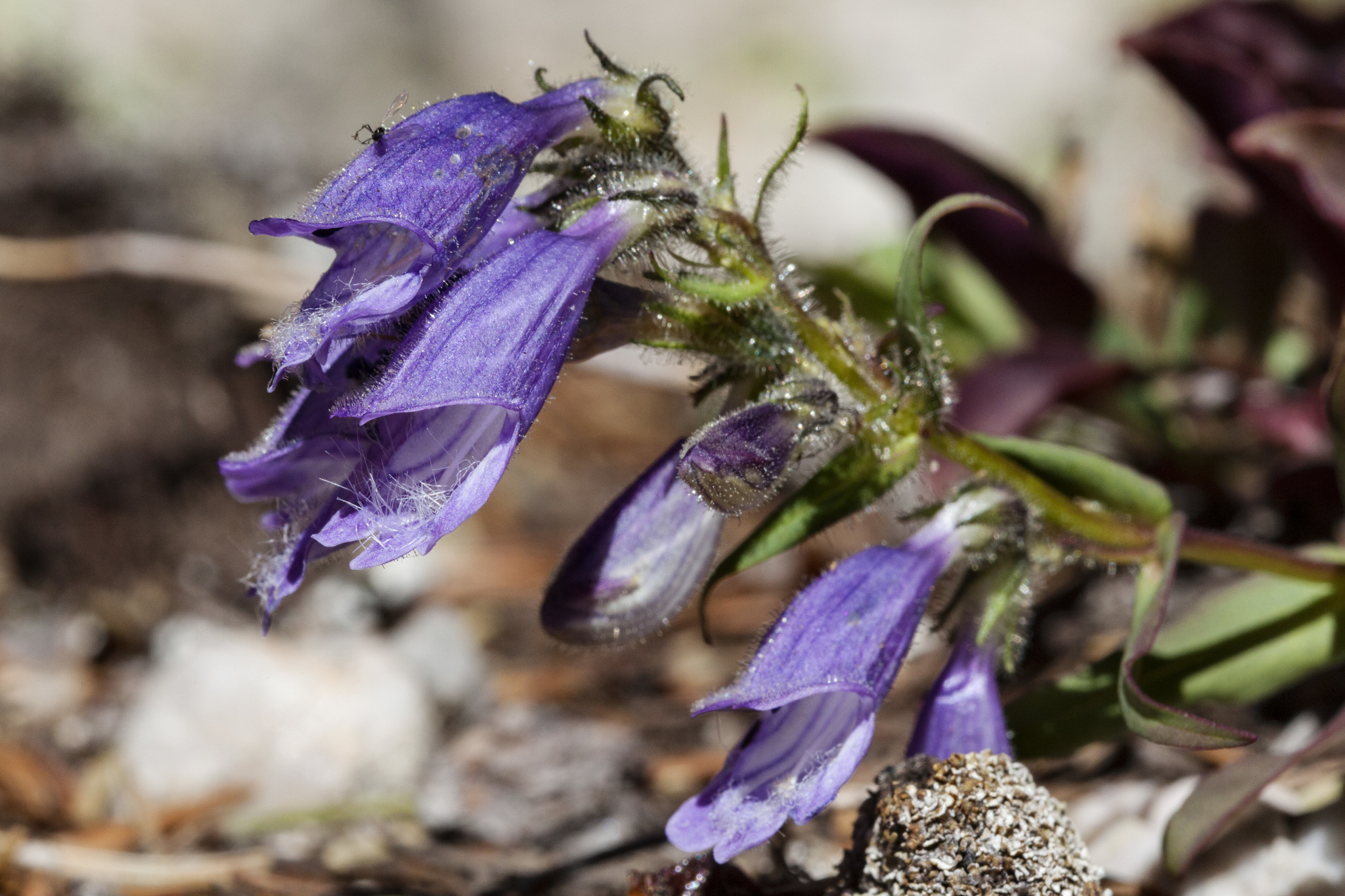
- Sangre de Cristo Mountains, south-southeast of Big Costilla Peak and west-northwest of Costilla Reservoir Taos County, New Mexico

Conservation status
- Critically Imperiled (NatureServe)

Scientific classification
- Kingdom: Plantae
- Clade: Tracheophytes
- Clade: Angiosperms
- Clade: Eudicots
- Clade: Asterids
- Order: Lamiales
- Family: Plantaginaceae
- Genus: Penstemon
- Species: P. bleaklyi

Binomial name
- Penstemon bleaklyi O'Kane & K.D.Heil

= Penstemon bleaklyi =

Plant species in the family

Penstemon bleaklyi, the Bleakly Penstemon, is a rare species of plant from the mountains of northern New Mexico and southern Colorado. It is one of the penstemons in the veronica family.

== Description ==
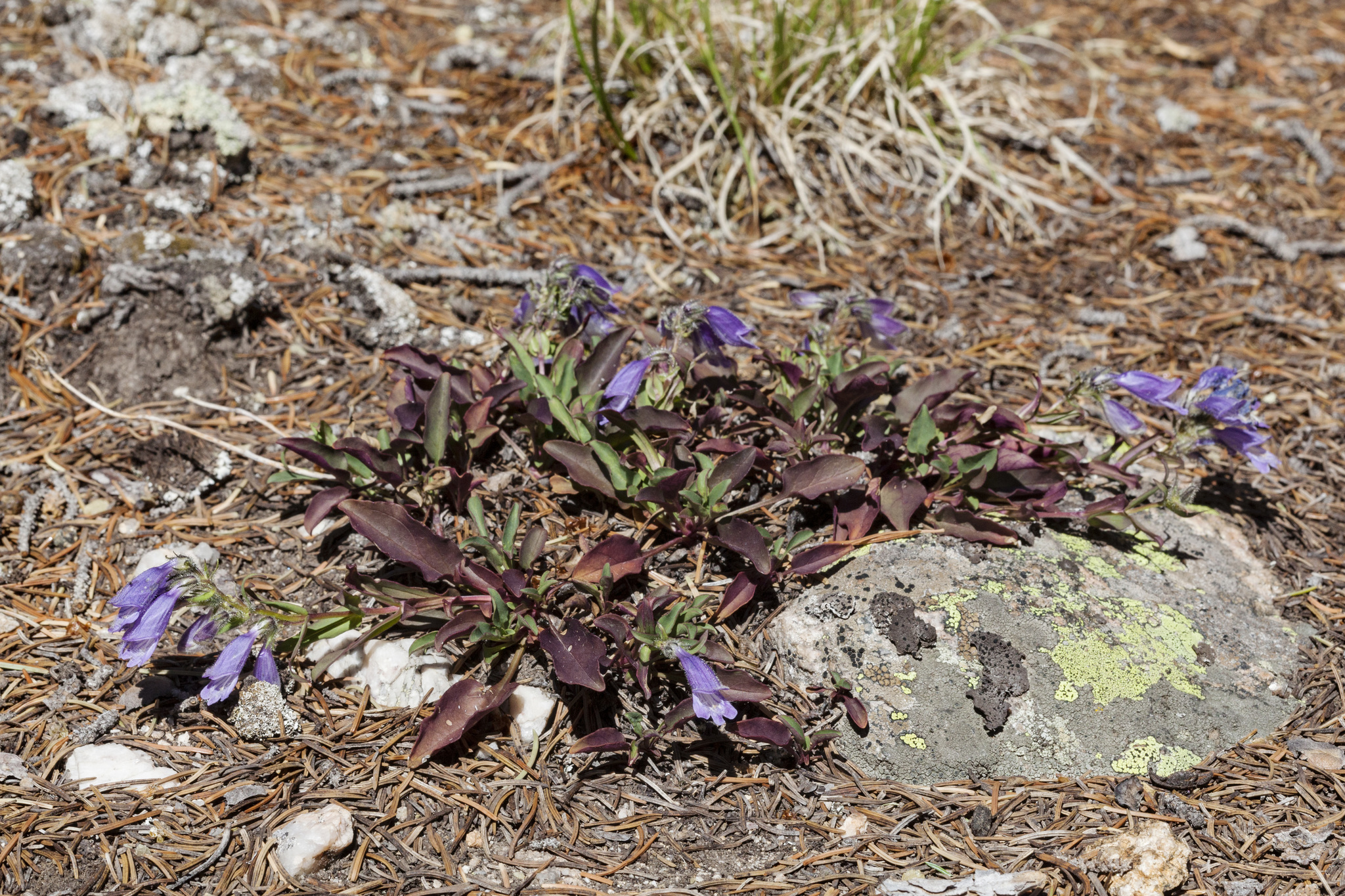
Whole plant in northern New Mexico

Penstemon bleaklyi is a short perennial with flowering stems that can be 2 to 8 centimeters tall. The stems are decumbent to ascending, growing along the ground and turning up at the ends or growing outward then curving to grow upwards. They are herbaceous plants that form a loose mat of somewhat woody rhizomes. Usually each plant has a central caudex from which the branched and tangled rhizomes grow.

Plants have both cauline and basal leaves, those that attach to stems and the ones growing directly from the base of the plant. The basal and lower stem leaves measure 15–35 millimeters long including the leaf stem and 4–15 mm wide. Leaves on the same plant can be smooth or serrulate, with deep wave shaped indentations. Their shape is lanceolate, elliptic, to oblanceolate with a tapering base and a wide to narrow angled point. The stems have three to seven pairs of leaves with those higher up ranging from 10–20 mm in length by 3–5 mm wide. They are lanceolate to linear-lanceolate in shape.

Each inflorescence is at the end of one of the retrorsely hairy stems. All the flowers face one direction and usually has two to six flowers, but can have as few as one flower or as many as eight. The flowers have a tubular shape that expands towards the mouth and is bluish lavender to lavender-purple in color. They measure 12–25 mm long. Internally they have violet nectar guides. The outsides of the flowers are covered with widely scattered white hairs with golden glandular tips. Each flower has a staminode 14–15 mm long extending out of the mouth of the flower with widely scattered yellow hairs.

The fruit is a hairless capsule measuring 4–7 mm long by 3–5 mm filled with 0.6–1 mm dark brown seeds with lighter edges.

== Taxonomy ==
Penstemon bleaklyi was scientifically described and named in 2014 by the botanists Steve Lawrence O'Kane Jr. and Kenneth Del Heil. It is classified in the Penstemon genus which is part of the family Plantaginaceae. It has no botanical synonyms.

=== Names ===
The species name was selected by O'Kane an Heil to honor David L. Bleakly, a New Mexican expert on penstemons. It is commonly known as Bleakly Penstemon or Bleakly’s beardtongue.

== Range and habitat ==
Initially the species was only known from the Culebra Range of the Sangre de Cristo Mountains in Taos County, New Mexico. However, in 2022 a photograph taken six years earlier by Jennifer Ackerfield in Colorado was identified as Penstemon bleaklyi by a New Mexican botanist. Though also in the Culebra Range, this was the first record made of the species in Colorado.

The habitat where it was first observed are rocky mountain slopes at 3,800 to 3,900 meters (12,500 to 12,800 ft).

=== Conservation ===
When evaluated in 2016 NatureServe rated the species as critically imperiled (G1) and has also rated it as critically imperiled in both Colorado and New Mexico (S1). However, the species is still pending final recognition by NatureServe as an accepted species.
