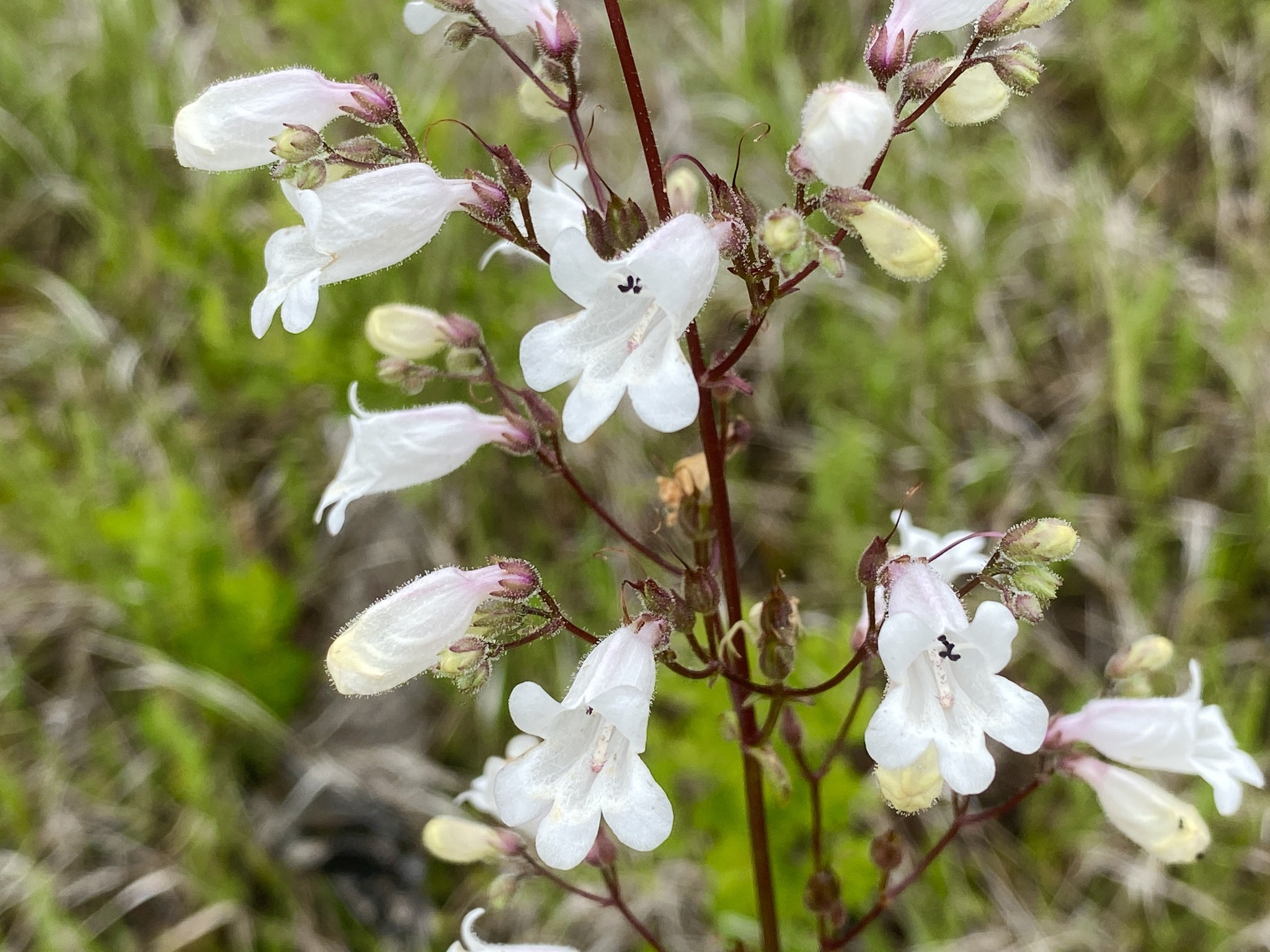

Conservation status
- Apparently Secure (NatureServe)

Scientific classification
- Kingdom: Plantae
- Clade: Tracheophytes
- Clade: Angiosperms
- Clade: Eudicots
- Clade: Asterids
- Order: Lamiales
- Family: Plantaginaceae
- Genus: Penstemon
- Species: P. multiflorus

Binomial name
- Penstemon multiflorus (Benth.) Chapm. ex Small

= Penstemon multiflorus =

Species of flowering plant

Penstemon multiflorus is a species of flowering plant in the family Plantaginaceae. It is native to the United States and commonly referred to as many-flower penstemon or many-flower beardtongue, is a flowering plant. It is a perennial between 1.5 and 2.5 feet high that blooms with white tubular shaped flowers. Its range includes parts of Alabama, Florida, and Georgia. It is widespread in Florida in well drained upland habitat. The flowers can have a slightly rose colored overcast.
