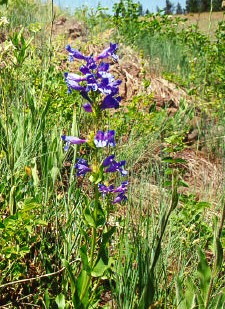

Conservation status
- Vulnerable (NatureServe)

Scientific classification
- Kingdom: Plantae
- Clade: Tracheophytes
- Clade: Angiosperms
- Clade: Eudicots
- Clade: Asterids
- Order: Lamiales
- Family: Plantaginaceae
- Genus: Penstemon
- Species: P. pennellianus

Binomial name
- Penstemon pennellianus D.D.Keck.

= Penstemon pennellianus =

Species of flowering plant

Penstemon pennellianus, often called the Blue Mountain beardtongue or Blue Mountain penstemon, is a species of beardtongue native to Washington and Oregon.

== Description ==
The Blue Mountain penstemon is a medium-sized perennial flower that grows 8 to 24 inches tall. It usually grows with clumps of basal leaves that are narrow, oblong and 3 to 10 inches long. Stem leaves clasping with the largest ones midstem and are oval-shaped with pointed tips. Flowers are a well-spaced cluster that grows tighter towards the top. The flowers are blue or purple and are 1 to 1 1/2 inches long, with a short-haired staminode at the throat, and sparse hairy anthers inside.

== Range ==
This species is endemic to the Blue Mountains in southeastern Washington and northeastern Oregon. It reportedly grows in the following counties; Columbia (WA), Garfield (WA), Asotin (WA), Umatilla (OR), Union (OR), Wallowa (OR) and Grant (OR). It is possible it also grows in Whitman County, Washington.

== Habitat ==
Subalpine areas, usually on rocky soil on the east side of hills or mountains. Open forests, ridge tops and gravelly slopes.
