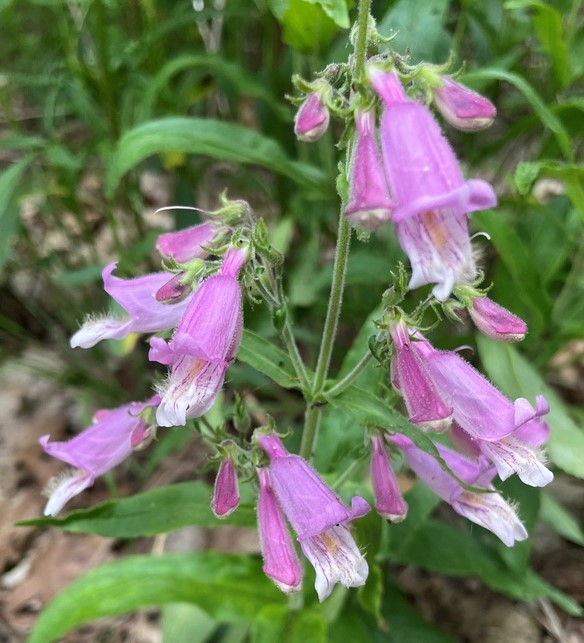
- In situ at Blood Mountain, Georgia

Conservation status
- Vulnerable (NatureServe)

Scientific classification
- Kingdom: Plantae
- Clade: Tracheophytes
- Clade: Angiosperms
- Clade: Eudicots
- Clade: Asterids
- Order: Lamiales
- Family: Plantaginaceae
- Genus: Penstemon
- Species: P. smallii

Binomial name
- Penstemon smallii A. Heller

= Penstemon smallii =

Species of plant

Penstemon smallii is a species of flowering plant also known as Small's penstemon. They are native to the mountains of the Southeastern United States. They are state listed in Georgia (S1), Alabama (S1), Tennessee (S3), North Carolina (S3), and South Carolina (S2).

== Description ==
They typically bloom in late spring or early summer with branched panicles of white to purple flowers. They produce inflated tubular flowers 2- 3.5 cm long with two spreading lips, the lower much longer than the upper. The upper lip has two lobes and the lower lip has three lobes, with the flower's throat having two strong ridges and abundant bearding. The leaves are serrate, glabrous, and generally have a lanceolate shape with cordate bases. Stem leaves are sessile, arranged oppositely, and clasp around the stem, though they also contain all the aforementioned elements.

== Ecology ==
Primarily found in the Southern Appalachians of the Carolinas, Georgia, and Tennessee, the species extends across the Ridge and Valley south into Alabama. There is also a population disjunction in the Piedmont of North Carolina within Wake County. They are generally found within or around rock outcrops, glades, barrens, bluffs, and rocky slopes, preferring circumneutral soils lacking in fertility. They are also known less frequently from open rocky woodlands, cliffs, and occasionally forest openings. They are most often pollinated by bumblebees and wasps.
