= Slender penstemon =

List of plants with the same or similar names

Slender penstemon is a common name of two species of plant:

- Penstemon gracilentus
- Penstemon gracilis
