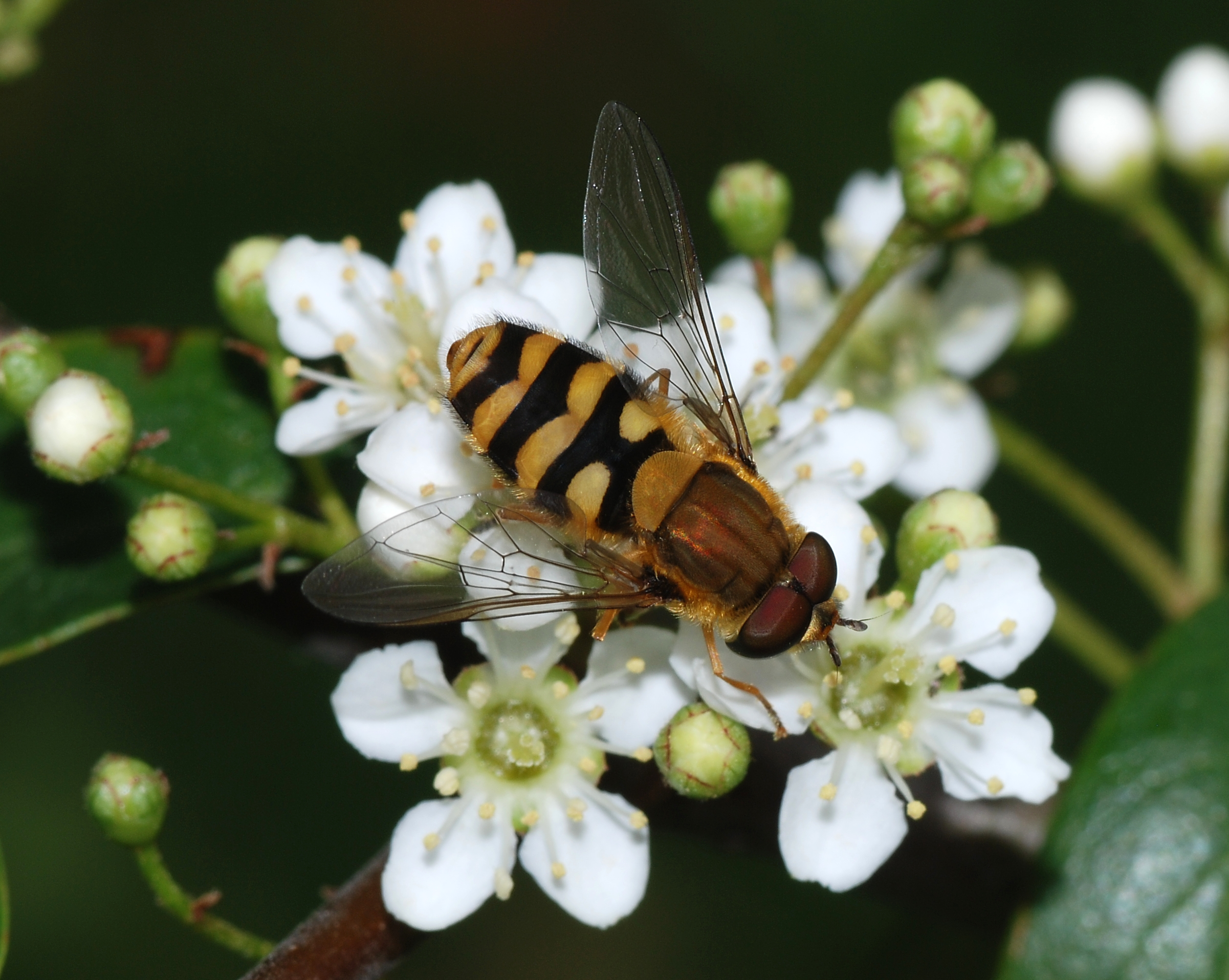
- male
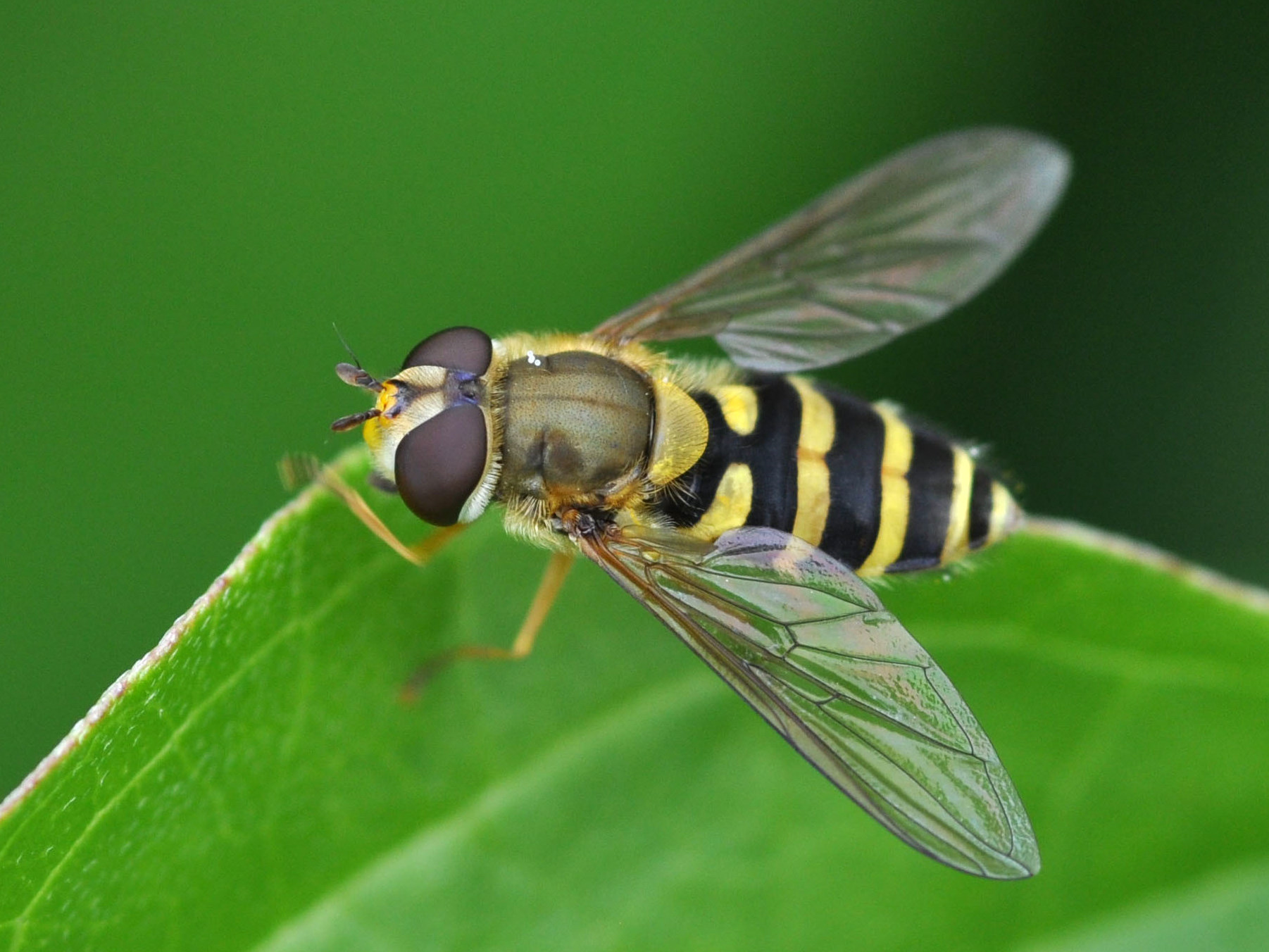
- female

Scientific classification
- Kingdom: Animalia
- Phylum: Arthropoda
- Class: Insecta
- Order: Diptera
- Family: Syrphidae
- Genus: Syrphus
- Species: S. ribesii

Binomial name
- Syrphus ribesii (Linnaeus, 1758)

Synonyms
- Musca blanda Harris, 1780; Musca ribesii Linnaeus, 1758; Syrphus blandus (Harris, 1780)

= Syrphus ribesii =

Species of fly

Syrphus ribesii is a very common Holarctic species of hoverfly. Its larvae feed on aphids. In common with many other species of hoverfly, males have the eyes meeting on the top of the head, whilst females have their eyes widely separated.

== Description ==
Adults are very similar in appearance to Syrphus vitripennis and Syrphus torvus. Females are distinguished from both by having entirely yellow hind femora, and from the latter by having no hairs present in their eyes. Males also have bare eyes, unlike S. torvus, but are extremely similar to S. vitripennis, differing only in having some black hairs present on the hind femur and in having the second basal cell of the wing entirely covered by microtrichia. The male genitalia and the larva have been described.

Frons is posterior to the lunulae, shiny black. Sternites have lateral and median black marks. Male femora 3 is black for basal 2/3. Femora 3 is yellow. Lateral margins of tergites are black except at the ends of the yellow bands.

== Distribution ==
Palearctic: Fennoscandia south to Iberia and the Mediterranean basin, Ireland eastward through Europe into Turkey, European Russia and Afghanistan. Also ranges from Urals to Siberia and Russian Far East to the Pacific coast (Kuril Isles) and Japan. Nearctic: Alaska southward to Central USA. Highly migratory.

Nearctic: United States and Canada.

== Biology ==
It is synanthropic, occurring in farmland, orchards, horticultural land, suburban gardens and parks. Also in deciduous and coniferous forest. It flies March to mid-November. The larva feeds on aphids on various herbaceous plants. Adults feed on nectar and pollen. Over much of Europe, there are two chromosome races of S. ribesii, one with 2n = 8, the other with 2n = 10.
