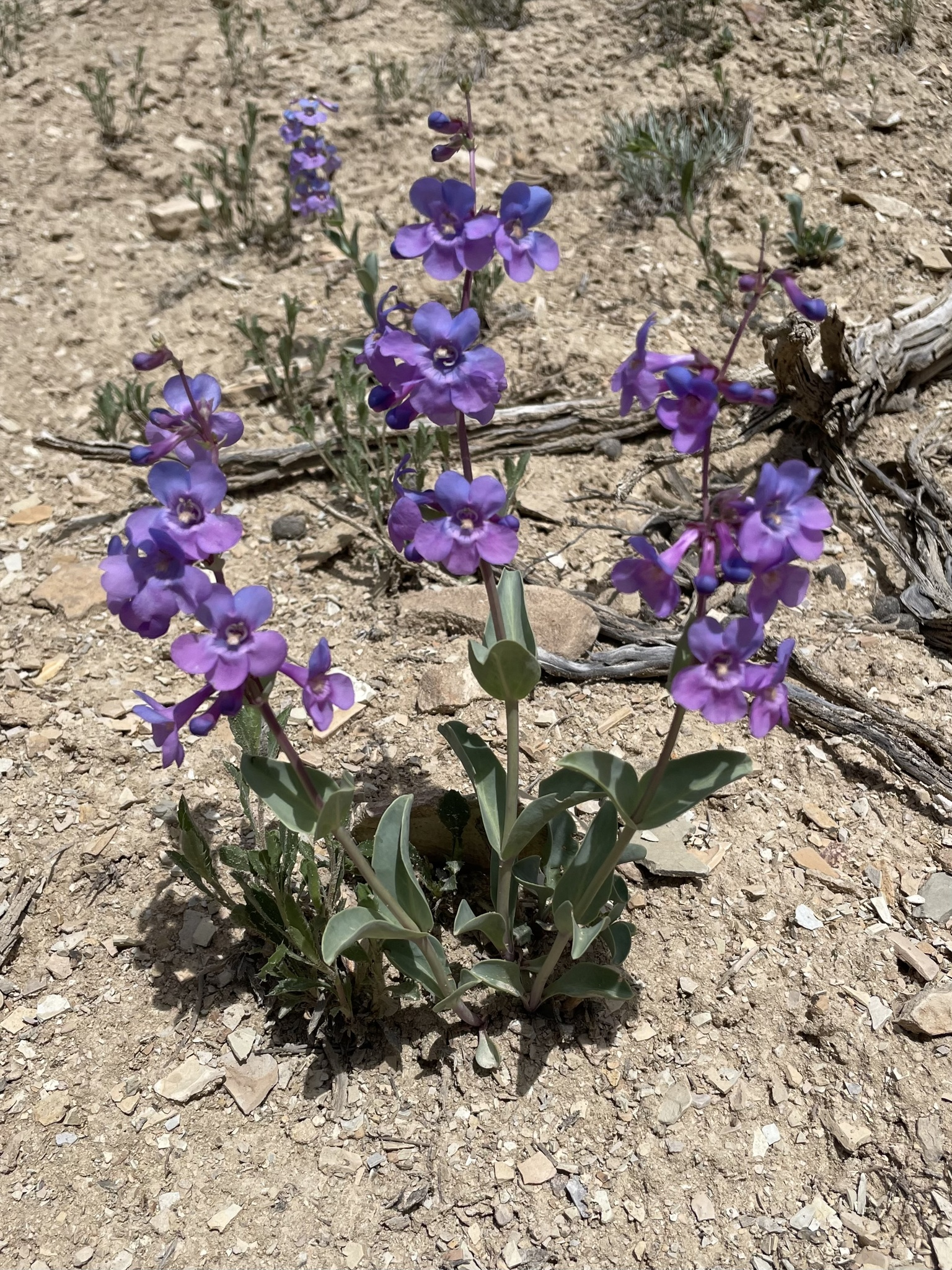
- In Rio Blanco County, Colorado

Scientific classification
- Kingdom: Plantae
- Clade: Tracheophytes
- Clade: Angiosperms
- Clade: Eudicots
- Clade: Asterids
- Order: Lamiales
- Family: Plantaginaceae
- Genus: Penstemon
- Species: P. mucronatus

Binomial name
- Penstemon mucronatus N.H.Holmgren

Synonyms
- Penstemon pachyphyllus var. mucronatus

= Penstemon mucronatus =

Plant species in the veronica family

Penstemon mucronatus, or mucronate penstemon, is a plant that grows in a small area of the western United States where the states of Colorado, Utah, and Wyoming meet.

== Description ==
Penstemon mucronatus is a short-lived perennial plant with a herbaceous character. Its flowering stems can reach as much as 46 centimeters (18 in), but are usually between 10 and 35 centimeters (4 and 14 in) tall. Each mature plant will have a few or just one stem growing from a caudex with short branches or a thick crown. Both stems and leaves are hairless and glaucous, pale blue-gray in color due to a covering of natural waxes.

The leaves have no divisions and have smooth edges and are somewhat thickened and fleshy. Their tips can be rounded or have a wide or narrow point, but always have a mucronate tip, a short extension of the central vein of the leaf. The plants have both cauline and basal leaves, attached to the stems or directly or the base of the plant. The basal leaves and the lowest ones on the stems are usually 2.3–6.5 cm (0.9–2.6 in) long, but can on occasion reach 10 cm (4 in). They are normally 1.3–4 cm (0.5–1.6 in) wide, however they might be as narrow as 9 millimeters. The leaves are attached to the stems in pairs with two to nine pairs, though most often four to six pairs. The upper leaves are attached directly to the main stem with a tapering base and measure 8–30 millimeters long by 8–26 mm wide.

The flowering stem end in an inflorescence that is 2 to 27 cm (0.8 to 10.6 in) long. It will have six to fifteen groups of flowers spread out along its length. Each cyme will have two to six flowers. Each flower is a tube that divides into petal-like lobes towards the end that are nearly equal in size, the flowers only slightly bilabiate. Most frequently they are 1.3 to 1.7 cm (0.5 to 0.7 in) long, but sometimes they may be as short at 1 cm or as long as 2 cm.

== Taxonomy ==
Penstemon mucronatus was scientifically described by Noel H. Holmgren in 1979. The type specimen described was found in Dagget County, Utah 6.5 kilometers south of Manila by Holmgren and Rupert Charles Barneby on 25 May 1978. It is part of the genus Penstemon in the Plantaginaceae family. Genetic testing confirms that Penstemon mucronatus is closely related to Penstemon pachyphyllus. It has one botanical synonym from when it was described as a variety of Penstemon pachyphyllus by Elizabeth Chase Neese in 1984. It is listed as an accepted species by Plants of the World Online and World Flora Online. However, it continues to be listed as a variety in databases maintained by NatureServe and the Natural Resources Conservation Service.

=== Chemistry ===
The trans-fused glycosides (5αH)-6α-8-epidihydrocornin and (5αH)-6α-8-hydroxy-8-epiloganin were first isolated from Penstemon mucronatus and reported in 1998. This was the second detection of trans-fused cyclopentanopyrano ring system, as opposed to the more common cis-fused ring structure found in glycoside forms of iridoids. They were first discovered in Penstemon secundiflorus. Other iridoids in the species include hastatoside, 8-epihastatoside, β-dihydrohastatoside, penstemoside, and cornin.

=== Names ===
In English Penstemon mucronatus is known by the common names mucronate penstemon or Sheep Creek beardtongue. In Botanical Latin mucronatus means ending abruptly in a short hard point.

== Range and habitat ==
Mucronate penstemons grow in the Uinta Mountains of northeastern Utah and the nearby areas of both Colorado and Wyoming. It grows in two counties in each state; Daggett and Uintah counties in Utah, Carbon and Sweetwater counties in Wyoming, and Moffat and Rio Blanco counties in Colorado. It can be found at elevations between 1,500 and 2,500 meters (4,900 and 8,200 ft).

Plants grow in sandy or gravelly areas in association with piñon–juniper woodlands and juniper woodlands.

=== Conservation ===
Penstemon mucronatus has not been evaluated by NatureServe since 1994. At that time they considered it to be a variety of Penstemon pachyphyllus and evaluated it as an apparently secure variety (T4).

== See also ==
List of Penstemon species
