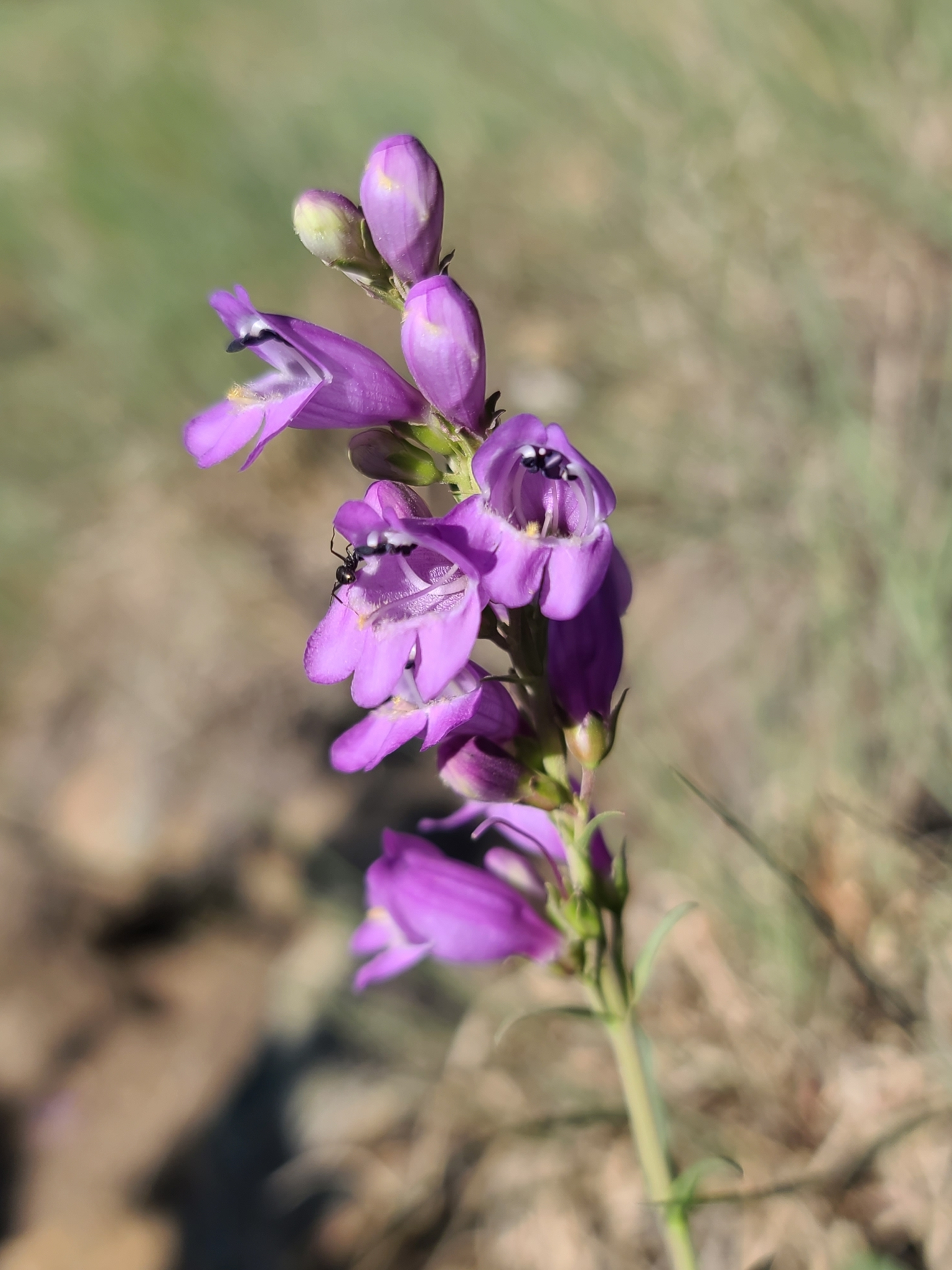
- West of Mount Graham in Arizona

Conservation status
- Apparently Secure (NatureServe)

Scientific classification
- Kingdom: Plantae
- Clade: Tracheophytes
- Clade: Angiosperms
- Clade: Eudicots
- Clade: Asterids
- Order: Lamiales
- Family: Plantaginaceae
- Genus: Penstemon
- Species: P. deaveri

Binomial name
- Penstemon deaveri Crosswh.

Synonyms
- Penstemon hallii var. arizonicus; Penstemon virgatus subsp. arizonicus

= Penstemon deaveri =

Plant species in the family

Penstemon deaveri, also known as Mount Graham penstemon and Deaver's Penstemon, is a penstemon species from the mountains of Arizona and New Mexico in the Southwestern United States. It has violet to lavender flowers and blooms in midsummer or early fall.

== Description ==
Mount Graham penstemons are a perennial plant that grows flowering stems that reach 16 to 60 centimeters (6.3–23.6 in) high. The stems grow straight upwards or out from the base of the plant before growing upwards and are not retrorsely hairy, covered in hairs that point down the stem.

It has both basal leaves and cauline leaves, those that attach to the stems, that are not leathery or glaucous. All the leaves can be hairless or the lower leaves can be puberulent near the base. The basal leaves and the lowest ones on the stems are 3.5–11 cm (1.4–4.3 in) long and 0.5–2.2 cm (0.2–0.9 in) wide. They are spatulate to oblanceolate in shape, like a narrow spoon or a reversed spear head. Plants have three to seven leaf pairs attached to the stems by the base of the leaf; the uppermost measuring 2–9.5 cm (0.8–3.7 in) long and just 0.4–1.6 cm wide.

The lavender to violet flowers have petals fused into a tube that has an opening of 6–8 millimeters in diameter and a total length of 1.6–2.5 cm. The outside of the flowers is hairless and the inside has sparse, white hairs and violet floral guide lines. They are on an inflorescence in three to eight groups, each with one or two points of attachment with one to four flowers. They are packed together without large gaps between the groups and face in all directions. Blooming can commence as early as July or still be occurring as late as September in its native habitat.

The fruit is a capsule measuring 9–1.2 mm long and 4.5–8 mm wide.

It is fairly similar in appearance to the wandbloom penstemon (Penstemon virgatus), it also grows in New Mexico and Arizona.

== Taxonomy ==
Penstemon deaveri was scientifically described by Frank Samuel Crosswhite in 1967. It is classified in the genus Penstemon as part of the wider Plantaginaceae family. It was previously described as a botanical variety of Penstemon hallii named arizonicus by Asa Gray in 1878 and later as a subspecies of Penstemon virgatus by David D. Keck in 1939.

=== Names ===
The species name, deaveri, is named for Chester Deaver, an expert on the plants of Arizona. Penstemon deaveri is known by the common names Mount Graham penstemon or Deaver's Penstemon.

== Range and habitat ==
Mount Graham penstemons grow in the US States of New Mexico and Arizona. In New Mexico it grows in the western part of the state in Valencia, Socorro, Cibola, and Catron counties, in the Socorro County San Mateo Mountains, Zuñi Mountains, Datil Mountains, and Mogollon Mountains. In Arizona it is found in Greenlee, Graham, and Apache counties in the White and Pinaleño Mountains. They grow at elevations of 2,000 to 3,400 meters (6,600–11,200 ft).

== Cultivation ==
In New Mexico Mount Graham penstemons are cultivated and somewhat popular, but the species is not long-lived.

== See also ==
- List of Penstemon species
