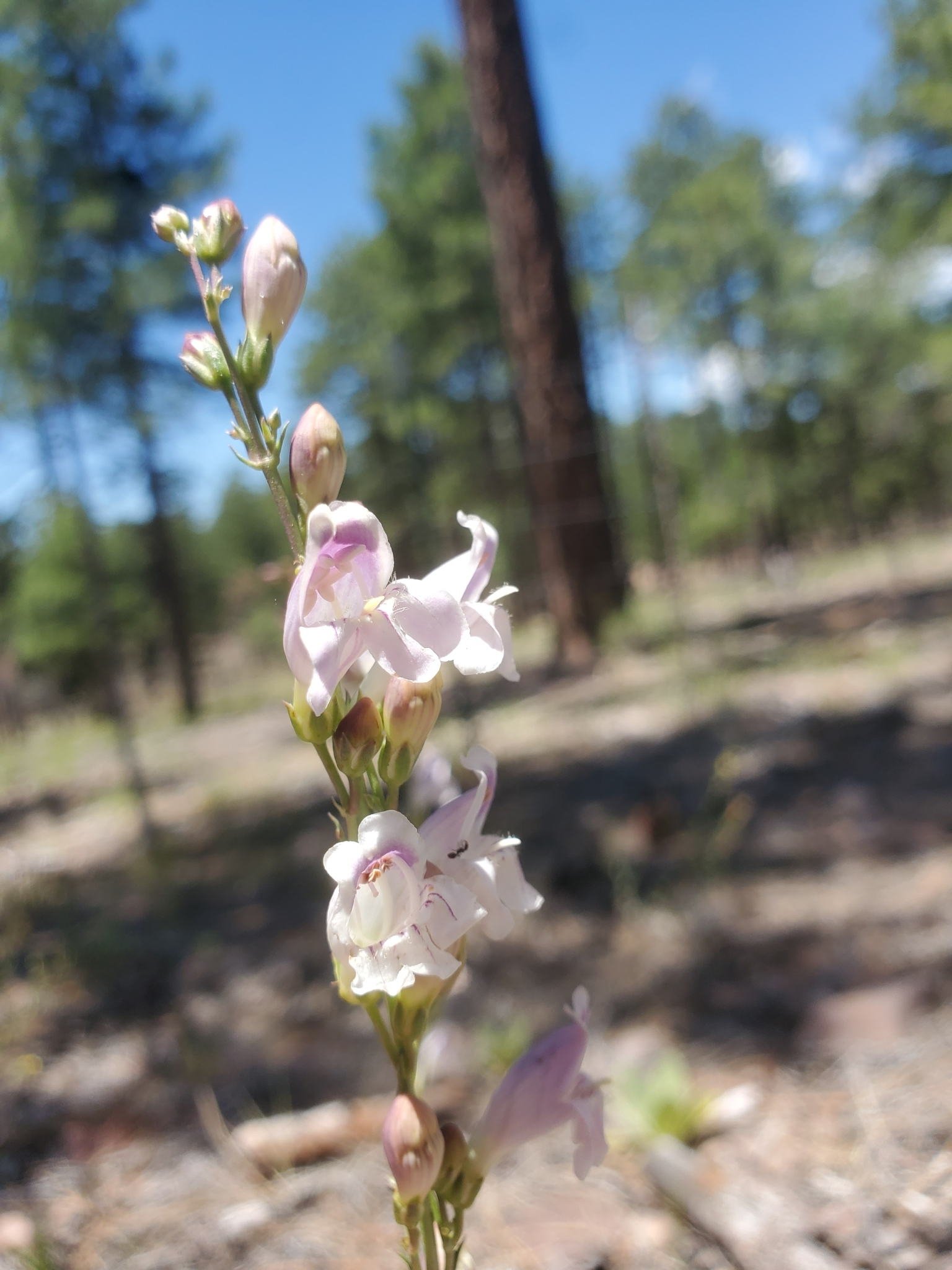
- West of the Valentine Ridge Campground in the Tonto National Forest

Conservation status
- Vulnerable (NatureServe)

Scientific classification
- Kingdom: Plantae
- Clade: Embryophytes
- Clade: Tracheophytes
- Clade: Spermatophytes
- Clade: Angiosperms
- Clade: Eudicots
- Clade: Asterids
- Order: Lamiales
- Family: Plantaginaceae
- Genus: Penstemon
- Species: P. putus

Binomial name
- Penstemon putus A.Nelson

Synonyms
- Penstemon virgatus subsp. putus

= Penstemon putus =

Plant species in the veronica family

Penstemon putus, also known as Black River penstemon, is a species in the veronica family which only grow in the state Arizona, primarily along the Mogollon Rim.

== Description ==
The Black River penstemon is a herbaceous perennial plant that has a woody caudex, which can grow one to ten flowering stems. The flowering stems are hairless, not glaucous, and grow straight upwards from the base of the plant or lean outwards somewhat before growing upwards, usually to a length of 20 to 45 centimeters (8–18 in), but occasionally to as much as 60 cm (24 in).

The leaves of the Black River penstemon are bright green, with smooth untoothed edges, and can grow directly from the caudex or be attached to the stems. Their texture can be leathery and they are linear, narrow like a grass blade, with the basal leaves and lowest ones on the stems measuring 1.5–12.5 centimeters (0.5–5 in) long and just 1–6 millimeters wide, often less than 4 mm. Each flowering stem will have five to seven pairs of leaves with the upper ones measuring 0.8–9.5 cm long and 0.5–4 mm wide and the base of the leaf directly attached by their bases to the main stem.

The flowers range in color from white to pink, lavender, violet, or blue and are hairless externally and have white hairs on the lower side of the flower's interior. The flowers have red-purple floral guide lines and are 1.8–2.2 cm long overall. They are in five to eleven groups on the upper part of the flowering stem, each group having one or two points where they attach and one to three flowers for each point of attachment. All the flowers face in one direction away from the stem.

== Taxonomy ==
In 1926 a new species in the genus Penstemon was scientifically described by Aven Nelson and named Penstemon putus Together with its genus it is classified in the Plantaginaceae family and has one homotypic synonym from 1967 when Frank Samuel Crosswhite published a description of it as a subspecies of Penstemon virgatus.

=== Names ===
The species name, putus, means "pure" in Botanical Latin. It is known by the common names Black River penstemon or Black River beardtongue.

== Range and habitat ==
The Black River penstemon is endemic to the state of Arizona in the western United States. There it mostly grows on the Mogollon Rim in the central to eastern parts of the state with the species recorded in Apache, Navajo, Gila, Yavapai, and Coconino counties. They can be found at elevations of 1,500–2,600 meters (4,900–8,500 ft) in pine forests and pinyon-juniper woodlands on sandy soils.

=== Conservation ===
The Black River penstemon was evaluated by NatureServe in 2000 and rated as vulnerable (G3) due largely to being endemic to a single state.

== Uses ==
Black River penstemons have a reputation for being easy to grow among penstemon enthusiasts. The seeds sprout with or without cold stratification and are adaptable to a variety of climates in the United States.

== See also ==
List of Penstemon species
