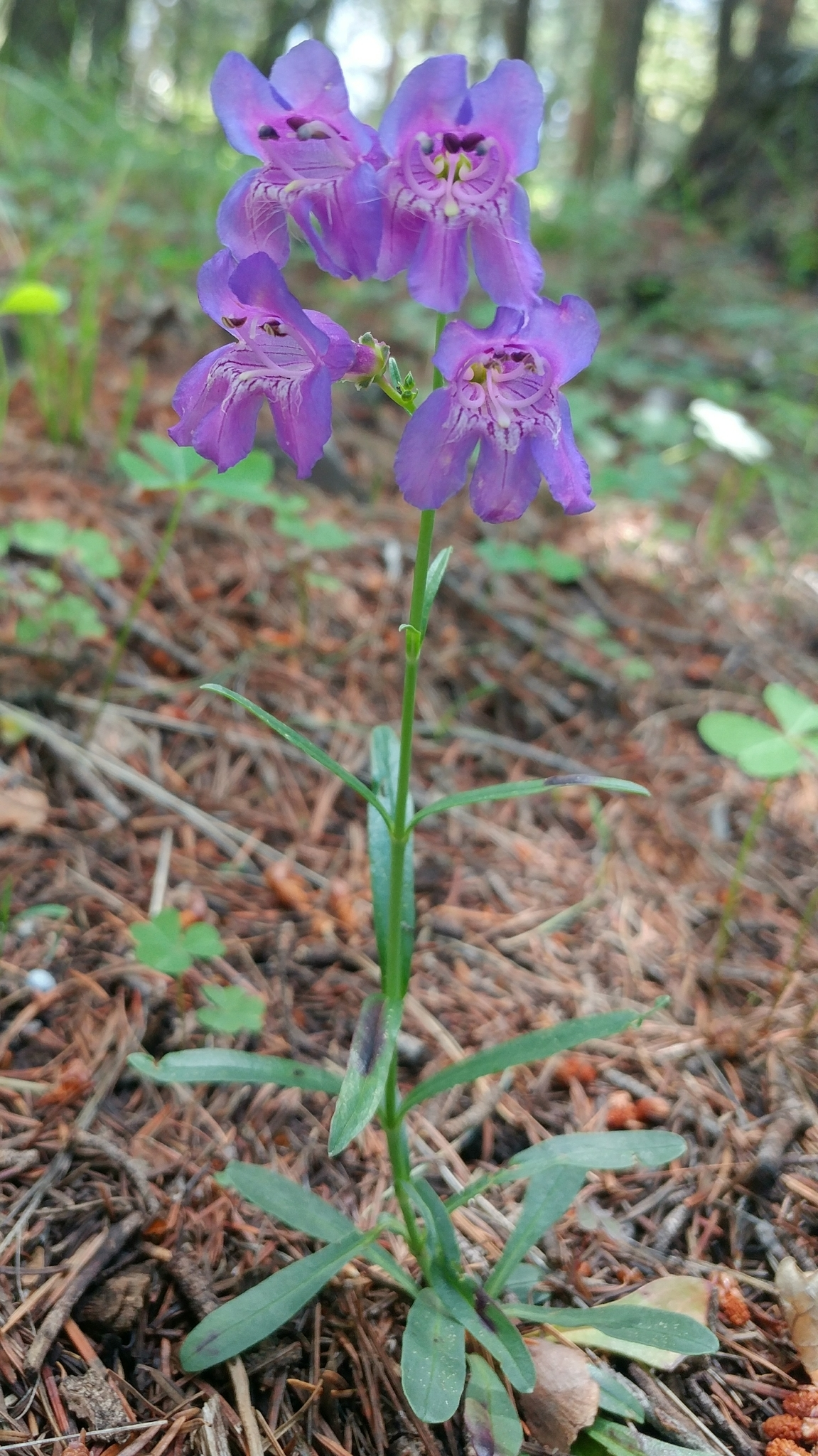
- Lincoln National Forest, New Mexico

Conservation status
- Apparently Secure (NatureServe)

Scientific classification
- Kingdom: Plantae
- Clade: Tracheophytes
- Clade: Angiosperms
- Clade: Eudicots
- Clade: Asterids
- Order: Lamiales
- Family: Plantaginaceae
- Genus: Penstemon
- Species: P. neomexicanus

Binomial name
- Penstemon neomexicanus Wooton & Standl.

= Penstemon neomexicanus =

Plant species in the veronica family

Penstemon neomexicanus, the New Mexican penstemon, is a plant species in the veronica family that primarily grows in the state of New Mexico in the western United States.

== Description ==
New Mexican penstemon is perennial plant with one or more hairless flowering stems that grow straight upwards from the base of the plant or lean outwards somewhat before growing upwards. They grow to a height of 30 to 63 centimeters (12–25 in) and are not glaucous.

Although New Mexican penstemons can have both basal leaves and leaves attached to the stems, the basal leaves usually fade by the time plants are flowering. The leaves are not leathery or glaucous, but can be either hairless or covered in backwards pointing hairs. The basal leaves and the lowest ones one the stems are usually 3–9 centimeters (1.2–3.5 in), but can be as much as 11.6 cm (4.6 in) in length. Their width is just 0.5–2.6 cm. They are oblanceolate, shaped like a reversed spear head, with a tapering base and smooth edges. The stems will have six to twelve leaf pairs attached to opposite sides of the stems. The upper stem leaves are lanceolate to narrow and grass-like and 2.5–11.3 centimeters (1.0–4.4 in) long.

The fused blue, blue-purple, or violet-blue petals form a wide funnel shape that opens to a mouth with five lobes. Overall length of this corolla is 2.6–3.4 cm. The width of the tube is 7–8 mm and it has reddish-purple floral guide lines. The longer pair of stamens extends out of the flower's mouth and the hairless staminode also extends out or just reaches the opening, 1.4–1.8 cm. The flowers are arranged in seven to eleven groups in the inflorescences. Each group will usually have two points where the flowers attach with one to four flowers. Flowering can be as early as June or as late as August in its native habitat.

The fruits are capsules measuring 9–14 mm long and 5–6 mm wide.

== Taxonomy ==
Penstemon neomexicanus was scientifically described in 1913 by E. O. Wooton and Paul Carpenter Standley. Wooton and Standley also collected the type specimen together on 15 August 1907 near Gilmores Ranch on Eagle Creek in the Sierra Blanca. It is classified in the genus Penstemon as part of the Plantaginaceae family. It has no subspecies or botanical synonyms.

=== Names ===
Penstemon neomexicanus is known by the common names New Mexican penstemon, New Mexico penstemon, or New Mexico beardtongue.

== Range and habitat ==
The New Mexican penstemon is mainly native to the state of New Mexico with just one historic collection of the species in the Mexican state of Chihuahua near the Mormon colony of Colonia Garcia. In New Mexico it is found in Lincoln and Otero counties with possible hybrids with Penstemon virgatus in northern Lincoln and southern Torrance counties. They grow in the Capitan Mountains, Sacramento Mountains, the Sierra Blanca, and near the Gallinas Mountains at elevations of 1,800 to 2,700 meters (5,900–8,900 ft).

It is associated with pine and spruce forests and grows in meadows or on slopes.

== See also ==
- List of Penstemon species
