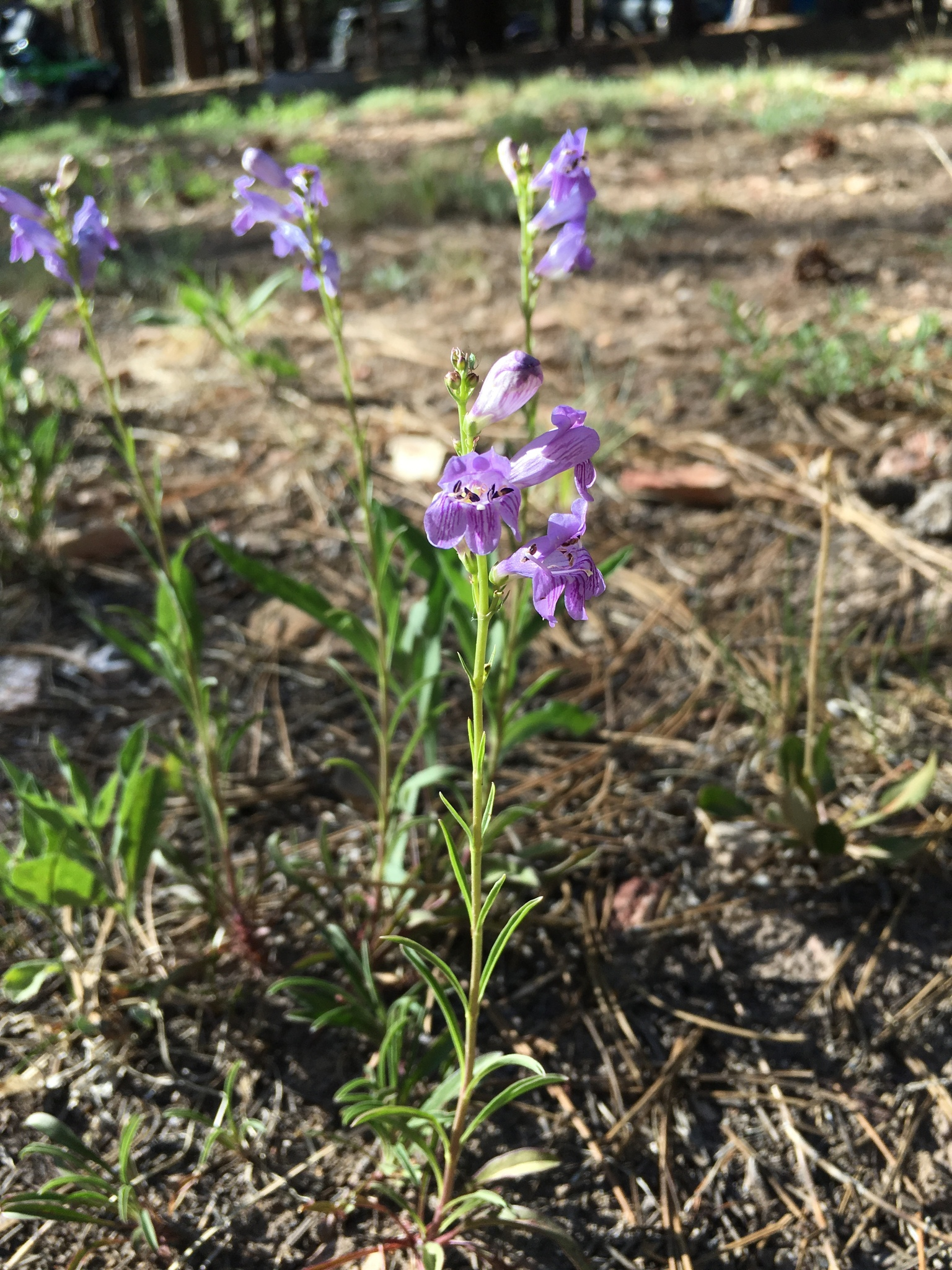
- North Rim, Grand Canyon National Park

Conservation status
- Vulnerable (NatureServe)

Scientific classification
- Kingdom: Plantae
- Clade: Embryophytes
- Clade: Tracheophytes
- Clade: Spermatophytes
- Clade: Angiosperms
- Clade: Eudicots
- Clade: Asterids
- Order: Lamiales
- Family: Plantaginaceae
- Genus: Penstemon
- Species: P. pseudoputus

Binomial name
- Penstemon pseudoputus (Crosswh.) N.H.Holmgren

Synonyms
- Penstemon virgatus subsp. pseudoputus

= Penstemon pseudoputus =

Plant species in the veronica family

Penstemon pseudoputus, the Kaibab penstemon, is a species in the veronica family from northern Arizona and southern Utah.

== Description ==
The Kaibab penstemon is a short-lived herbaceous perennial plant. It has flowering stems that grow straight upwards or lean out from the plant's crown to a length of 15 to 50 centimeters (6–20 in), but occasionally they can be as short as 8 cm (3 in). Each plant can a few flowering stems or just one that sprout from a branched caudex with fibrous roots.

Plants usually have both basal leaves sprouting directly from the caudex at the base of the plant and leaves attached to the flowering stems, although at times the basal leaves are missing. All the leaves are retrorsely hairy, covered in stiff, backwards pointing hairs, and are also narrow like a grass blade, not leathery, and not covered in grey-blue natural waxes. The lowest leaves on the stems and the basal leaves are 1.6–8 centimeters (0.5–3 in) long, but rarely exceed 6 cm (2.5 in). The leaf rolls inwards and is typically 0.5–1.5 millimeters wide, but unrolled will be about 3 mm wide. Each flowering stem will have six to eleven pairs of leaves. The uppermost leaves are usually 1–7.5 cm long, but can occasionally be as short as just 2 mm and are quite narrow, just 0.2–3 mm.

The small flowers are blue to purple with white throats and all face in one direction away from the stem. The flowers have reddish-purple floral guide lines and the fused petals are some 1.7–2.3 cm long and are hairless inside and out. Each flowering stem has three to ten groups of flowers each with one or two points of attachment and one or two flowers per point.

== Taxonomy ==
In 1967 Frank Samuel Crosswhite (1940–2008) scientifically described a subspecies of Penstemon virgatus which he named pseudoputus. In 1979 Noel Herman Holmgren raised it to being a species named Penstemon pseudoputus. Together with the genus Penstemon it is classified in the Plantaginaceae family and has no subspecies or varieties.

=== Names ===
The common names Kaibab penstemon and Kaibab beardtongue are used for Penstemon pseudoputus.

== Range and habitat ==
The Kaibab penstemon grows in the states of Arizona and Utah. In Arizona it grows on the Kaibab and Walhalla plateaus in northern Coconino County. The population in Utah is disjunct from the rest of the range on the Markagunt Plateau in eastern Garfield and eastern Kane counties.

== Uses ==
The seeds of Kaibab penstemons are available in commercial trade, but the species is not commonly grown by gardeners.

== See also ==
List of Penstemon species
