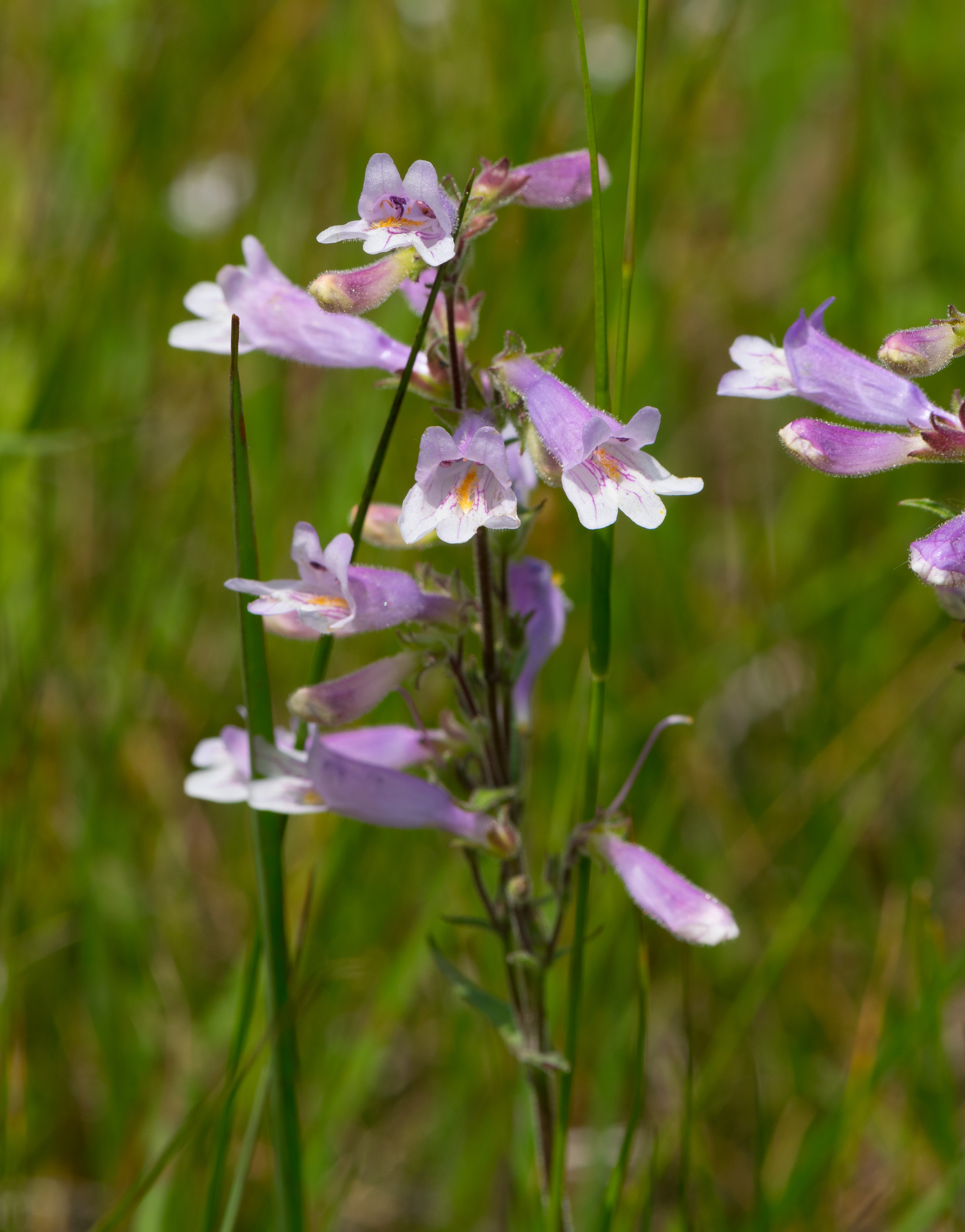
- Buffalo River Trail Prairies, Jackson County, Wisconsin

Conservation status
- Secure (NatureServe)

Scientific classification
- Kingdom: Plantae
- Clade: Tracheophytes
- Clade: Angiosperms
- Clade: Eudicots
- Clade: Asterids
- Order: Lamiales
- Family: Plantaginaceae
- Genus: Penstemon
- Species: P. gracilis

Binomial name
- Penstemon gracilis Nutt.

Synonyms
- Chelone gracilis; Penstemon digitalis var. gracilis; Penstemon pubescens var. gracilis

= Penstemon gracilis =

Plant species in the veronica family

Penstemon gracilis, more commonly the slender penstemon or lilac penstemon, is flowering plant in the veronica family. It primarily grows in the northern Great Plains of the United States and southern Canada.

== Description ==
Slender penstemon is a perennial plant that generally is 20 to 50 centimeters (8 to 20 in) tall when fully grown, but occasionally can be just 15 cm (6 in). Each plant will usually have one to four stems, but on occasion can have as many as six. The stems may grow directly upward or outwards before bending to grow upwards. They are commonly reddish higher up and are glandular-pubescent, having hairs with glands that will exude plant chemicals, near the inflorescence, but have backwards facing hairs without glands towards the base. The stems grow from a short and slender caudex that is herbaceous rather than woody. The caudex tops a taproot.

The leaves of slender penstemons are both cauline and basal, attached to the stems or directly to the base of the plant. They are never leathery and are usually hairless, but in some populations or individuals they can be sparsely or densely hairy. The leaves with puberulent, short, thin hairs, are most often found in the Driftless Area of Wisconsin or mixed with hairless plants in North Dakota. They have edges that are just short of being smooth to serrate, having asymmetrical teeth that point forward. The basal leaves and the lowest leaves on the stems are 2.5 to 7.5 centimeters long and just 4 to 15 millimeters wide. They can be ovate, oblanceolate, or lanceolate. The stems have four to seven pairs of leaves. The upper leaves attach directly to the stem and measure 2 to 9 cm by 2 to 15 mm. They are lanceolate to linear, narrow like a grass blade.

On each stem there will be two to seven groups of flowers attached at two points on the stem with four to twelve flowers in each group. The blooms are less showy than many other species of penstemon. The flowers are small, with a narrow throat, pale blue-violet to lavender darkening to wine color at the base. They are tubular and the fused petal measure 1.4 to 2.2 centimeters. The upper lip of the flower appear smaller than the lower and often is bent backwards while the lower lip projects outwards and can have white hairs. The interior of the flower is lighter than the outside and has mauve or purple floral guides. The staminode reaches the opening of the flower or just barely projects out of it and is thickly covered with golden-yellow hairs.

The fruit is a seed capsule 6–8 mm long and 3–4 mm wide. The seeds are dark brown, rounded to angular, and measure 0.6–0.8 mm.

== Taxonomy ==
Penstemon gracilis was scientifically described and named in 1818 by Thomas Nuttall. In 1839 it was described as a variety of Penstemon digitalis by Ernst Rudolf von Trautvetter, but this did not become an accepted classification. Its normal 2n chromosome count is 16.

It is classified as a Penstemon, a genus in the family Plantaginaceae. According to Plants of the World Online it has no accepted subspecies or varieties, but the USDA Natural Resources Conservation Service (NRCS) plants database continues to list Penstemon gracilis var. wisconsinensis and the species autonym as valid. The population with more hairy leaves is mainly found in the Driftless Area of Wisconsin and in one county in Illinois.

In the 1980s a population of dwarfed Penstemon gracilis growing to just a quarter of the normal height was identified near Elkford, British Columbia. These plants retained their smaller size when grown in garden conditions indicating a genetic factor in their smaller size.

It has nine synonyms including three species.

Table of Synonyms
Name	Year	Rank	Notes
Chelone gracilis (Nutt.) Spreng.	1825	species	≡ hom.
Penstemon digitalis var. glaucus (Graham) Trautv.	1839	variety	= het.
Penstemon digitalis var. gracilis (Nutt.) Trautv.	1839	variety	≡ hom.
Penstemon glaucus Graham	1829	species	= het.
Penstemon gracilis f. scoggannii B.Boivin	1972	form	= het.
Penstemon gracilis subsp. wisconsinensis Pennell	1935	subspecies	= het.
Penstemon gracilis var. wisconsinensis (Pennell) Fassett	1938	variety	= het.
Penstemon pubescens var. gracilis (Nutt.) A.Gray	1862	variety	≡ hom.
Penstemon wisconsinensis Pennell	1935	species	= het.
Notes: ≡ homotypic synonym; = heterotypic synonym

=== Names ===
It is known by the common names slender penstemon and lilac penstemon, however Penstemon secundiflorus is occasionally referred to as lilac penstemon. It is additionally known as slender beardtongue and lilac beardtongue.

In the Lakota language it is known as zuze'ca tapejuta.

== Range and habitat ==
Slender penstemons are native to central and western Canada, the north-central United States, and the eastern edge of the Rocky Mountains to northern New Mexico. In Canada they reach the south-westernmost part of Ontario and extend westwards to Alberta and the northeast of British Columbia. In the United States isolated occurrences are recorded in Lake County, Indiana and Kane County, Illinois. However, according to the Flora of North America the Indiana population is a human introduction. The single report of the species in Michigan is in Dickinson County, in the Upper Peninsula. To the west it becomes more common, being reported in approximately the western half of Wisconsin, most of Minnesota, and both the Dakotas. It is only in northwest Iowa and is more common in the northern counties of Nebraska. Almost all the occurrences in Montana are in the east with the exception of Sanders County in the far west of the state. Most of the range is in the northeast of Wyoming and the occurrences in Colorado are at lower elevations in the eastern Rocky Mountains. It reaches its southern limits in northern New Mexico where it is found occasionally in the lower mountains in the North East. It can be found at elevations of 300 to 2,100 meters (980 to 6,890 ft).

It is primary a species of the northern Great Plains and grows in tallgrass, mixed grass, and shortgrass prairies. Slender penstemon also grows in the foothills of the Rocky Mountains and in open woods in Canada. It generally grows in areas with sandy or gravelly soils.

== Ecology ==
In a study of changing bloom dates due to climate change lilac penstemon was one of just ten species out of more than 120 studied from northern Great Plains that maintained a consistent flowering date despite warmer temperatures. In fact it bloomed an average of two days earlier in 2007–2010 than its average in 1910–1961.

=== Conservation ===
Lilac penstemon was evaluated by the conservation organization NatureServe in 2016 and rated as secure at the global level (G5). It was similarly rated as apparently secure (S4) in New Mexico, Ontario, Saskatchewan, and Alberta. However it was found to be vulnerable (S3) in Wyoming, British Columbia, and Manitoba and critically imperiled (S1) in Iowa and Michigan. They have not rated the rest of the states and provinces in its range.

== Cultivation ==
Within its native range it is grown as a xeriscape plant in gardens and is winter hardy in USDA Zones 3 to 6.

== See also ==
- List of Penstemon species
