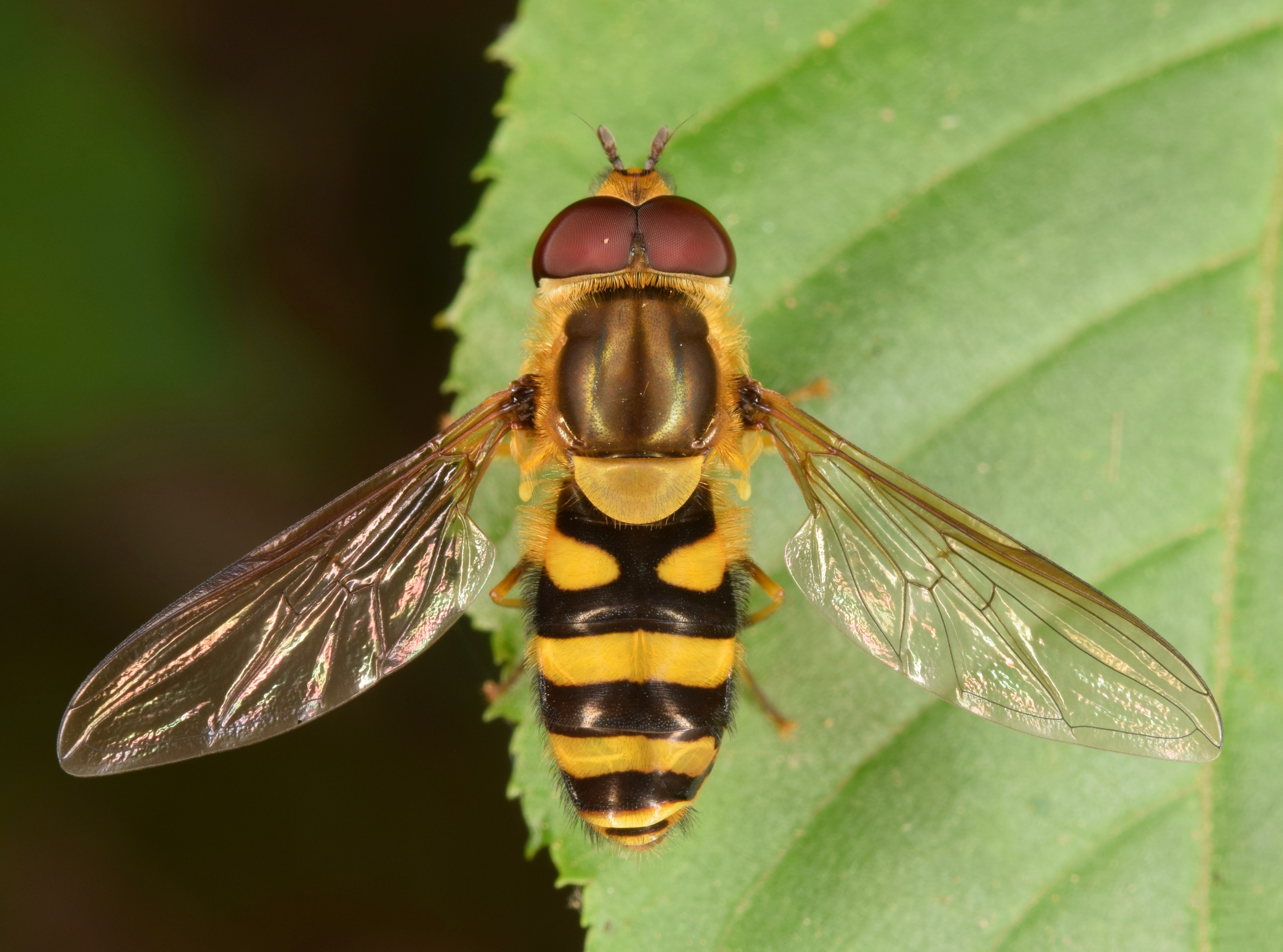
- Syrphus knabi

Scientific classification
- Kingdom: Animalia
- Phylum: Arthropoda
- Class: Insecta
- Order: Diptera
- Family: Syrphidae
- Tribe: Syrphini
- Genus: Syrphus
- Species: S. knabi

Binomial name
- Syrphus knabi Shannon, 1916
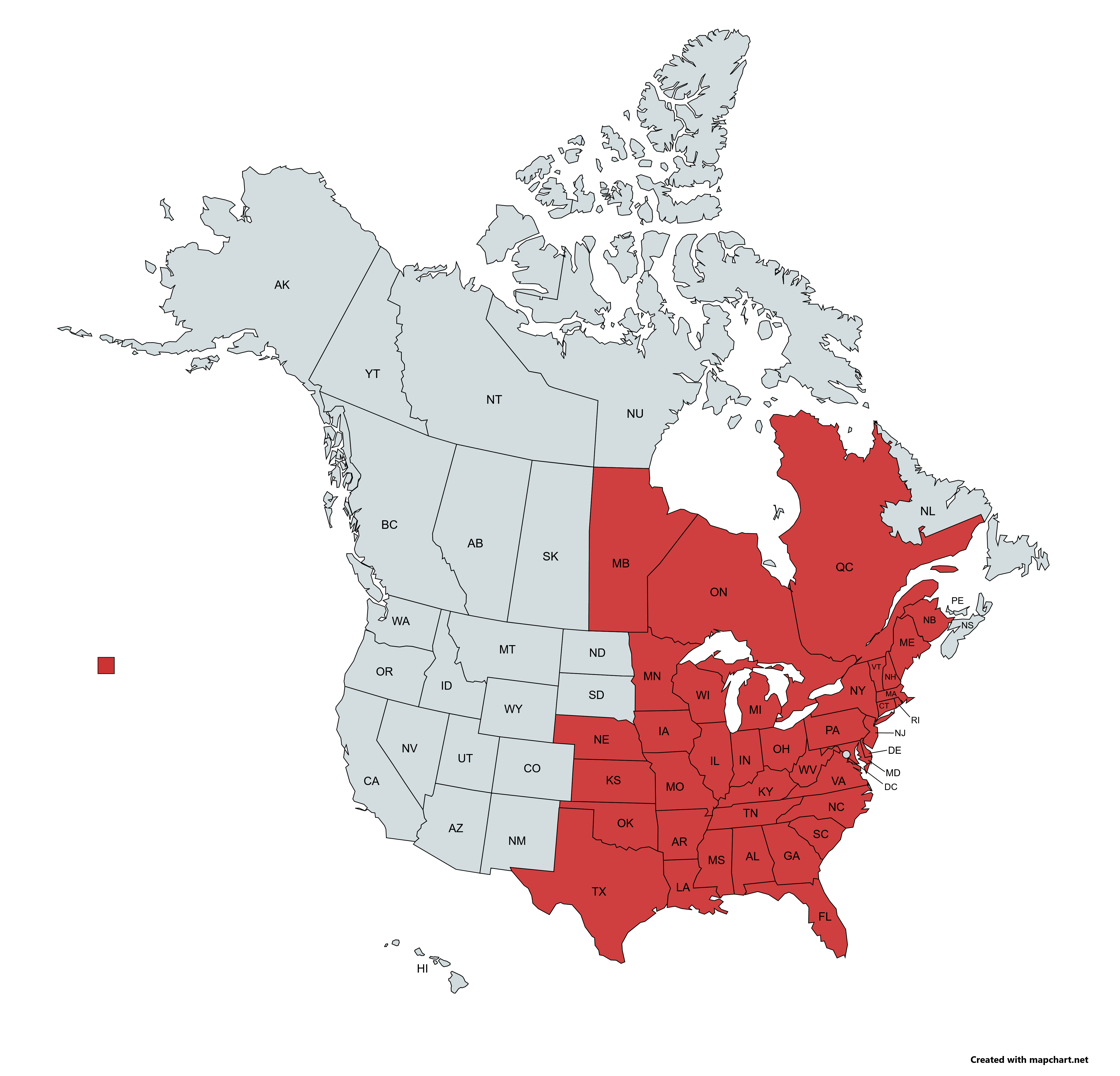
- Syrphus knabi distribution 2023

= Syrphus knabi =

Species of fly

Syrphus knabi (Shannon, 1916), the Eastern flower Fly, is an uncommon species of syrphid fly observed in the eastern United States and Canada. Syrphid flies are also known as Hover Flies or Flower Flies because the adults are frequently found hovering around flowers from which they feed on nectar and pollen. Adults are 7.2–12.9 mm (0.28–0.51 in) long. The larvae are predators of a variety of aphids in trees.

== Description ==
For terminology Speight key to genera and glossary

Size

Length. 7.2–12.9 mm (0.28–0.51 in)

Head

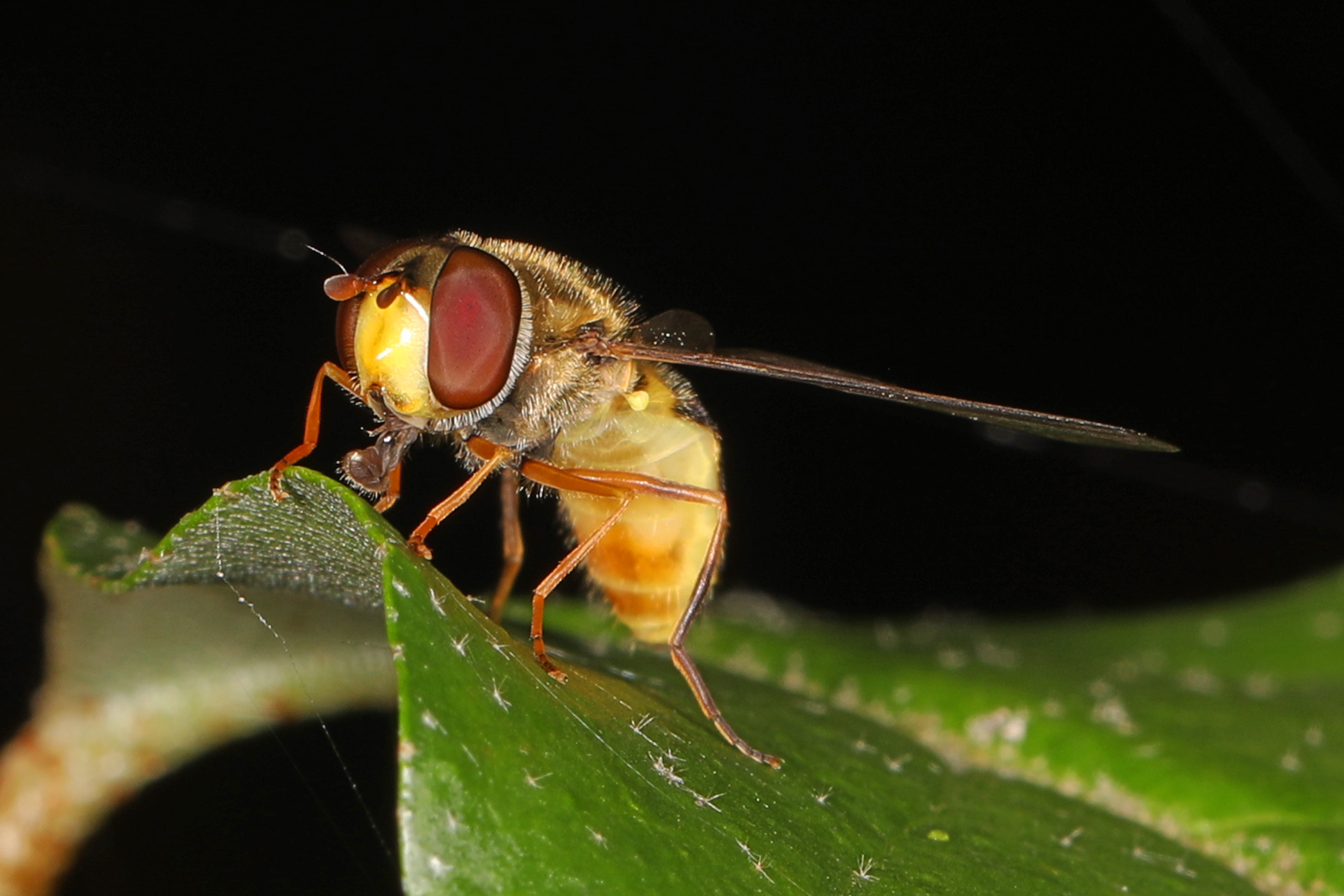
frontal view female

The male has bare eyes that are holoptic, meaning that the eyes are completely joined together. The frons is yellow and is yellow pollinose on the upper two-thirds with a pair of brown anterior spots on the lower one-third. It has a bluish green reflection, a black spot above each antenna, and fine, rather long black hairs that continue a short distance down between the antennae and eyes. In the female, the frons is black and sparsely pruinose on the upper one-quarter, otherwise mostly yellow, densely yellow pruinose, and commonly slightly darkened medially. The anterior part is narrowly shining yellow and has a pair of brown anterior spots. The width of the frons at the vertex is roughly equal to the length of the third antennal joint, but it widens quickly down to the antennae.

Thorax

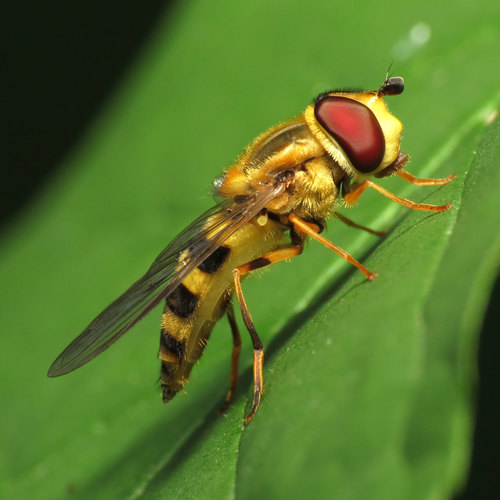
S. knabi lateral view

The scutum is broadly and distinctly yellow pollinose laterally, with the ground color of the sides of the thorax being a bright yellow, clothed with yellow pile. The scutum has two obvious median stripes and bright yellow sides, with light golden pile. The scutellum is yellow with a greenish sheen and black pile, with yellow pile on the sides. The pleurae are a slightly lighter yellow than the lateral stripes of the dorsum, with a golden pile.

Abdomen

The abdomen is black with yellow bands. The band on the second abdominal segment is broken in the center and extends forward, extending onto the sides of the first segment. The bands on the third and fourth abdominal segments are continuous, straight and extend over the margin near the full width of the bands.

Wings

The wing membrane is extensively microtrichose, with cells br and bm almost entirely bare. The squamae have rather long, light yellow pile.

Legs

The front and middle femora are yellow and yellow-haired, while the hind femur is yellow with the apical half mostly brownish and with few to many black hairs anteriorly. The middle basitarsi have yellow spicules below, while the first tarsomere of the middle leg only has yellow setulae below. The first tarsomere of the hind leg is mostly or entirely orange above, while the front coxae and trochanters are dark gray and the hind trochanters are yellowish. The front and middle legs are entirely yellow, while the hind pair are yellow with a dark band beyond the middle and yellow posteriorly. The hind tibiae are darkened on the outer side of the apical half and clothed with black pile. The last four tarsal joints are also darkened.
