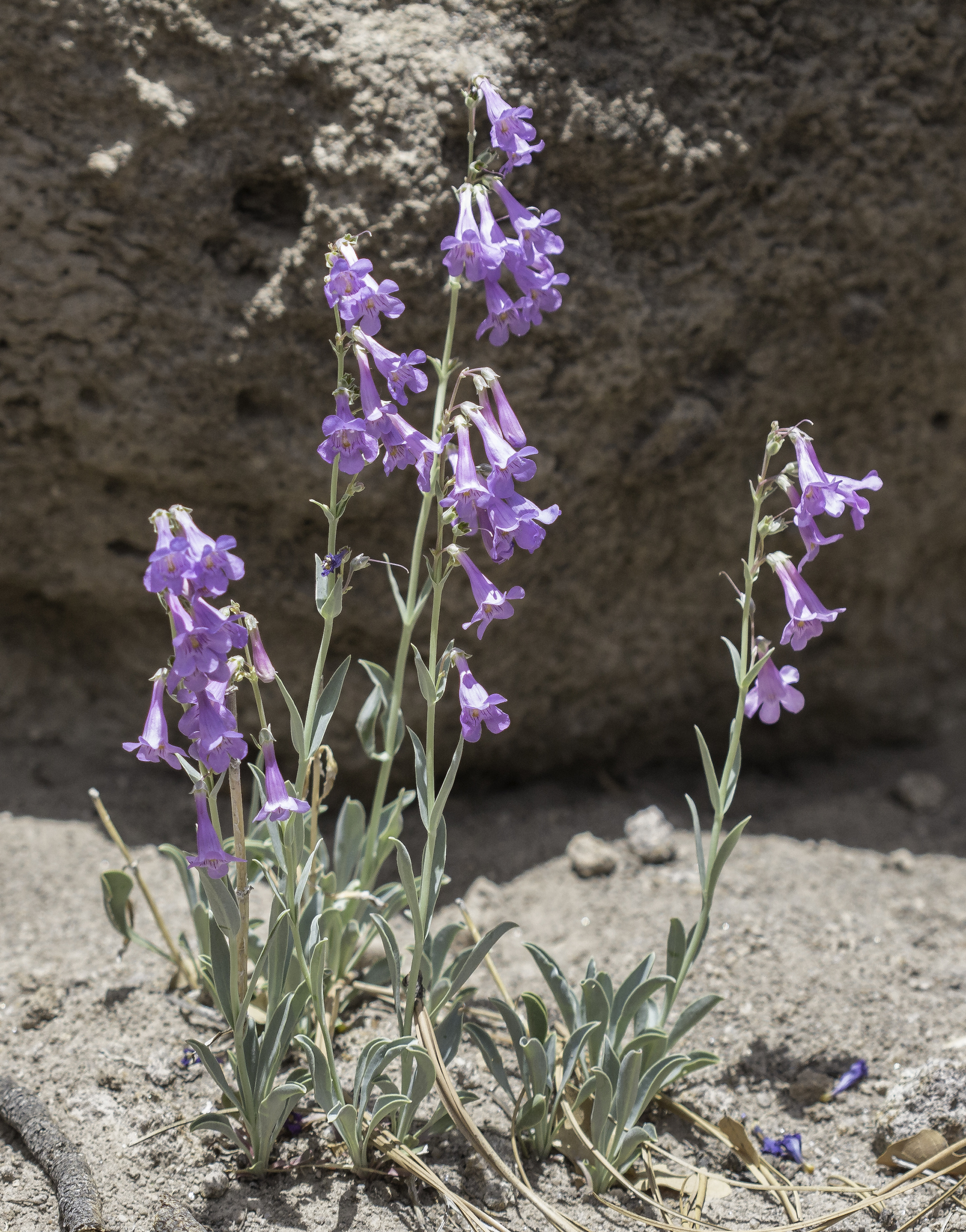
- Santa Fe National Forest, Los Alamos County, New Mexico

Conservation status
- Unranked (NatureServe)

Scientific classification
- Kingdom: Plantae
- Clade: Tracheophytes
- Clade: Angiosperms
- Clade: Eudicots
- Clade: Asterids
- Order: Lamiales
- Family: Plantaginaceae
- Genus: Penstemon
- Species: P. secundiflorus

Binomial name
- Penstemon secundiflorus Benth.

Varieties
- P. s. var. secundiflorus; P. s. var. versicolor

Synonyms
- Penstemon unilateralis; Penstemon versicolor

= Penstemon secundiflorus =

Plant species in the veronica family

Penstemon secundiflorus, commonly known as sidebells penstemon or orchid penstemon, is a species of Penstemon that grows in dry forests, high plains, and scrub lands from Wyoming to Mexico. It is a herbaceous perennial plant that typically grows to a height of 20 to 50 cm (8 to 20 in) and has narrow, lance-shaped leaves that are grayish-green in color. The flowers of the sidebells penstemon are tubular in shape and are arranged in a one-sided spike, with the blooms all facing the same direction, and for this reason was named secundiflorus, which means "one-sided flowers". The flowers are most often delicate shades of orchid or lavender. It is sometimes used in xeriscaping, rock gardens, and wildflower meadows, and is well-suited to dry, sunny locations with well-draining soil.

== Description ==
Sidebells penstemons are relatively long-lived mostly herbaceous plants. They usually die back fully each year, but may retain some leaves over the winter or have a slightly woody above ground stem, called a caudex, that it will re-sprout from in the spring.

The basal leaves vary in shape from lanceolate to spatulate. They are usually 20–80 mm long and 2–25 mm wide, though occasionally they will be as long as 102 mm. The leaves are entirely smooth, free of hairs, and somewhat glaucous, gray-green in color from the natural waxes that protect the plant from drying out. The tips of the leaves are usually rounded point varying from being slightly more or less than a right angle (obtuse to acute), but occasionally will have a mucronate tip, a sharp point that stands out end. The leaf edges are smooth, without any teeth or lobes. The leaves on the flowering stem are arranged in pairs with the lower leaves being very similar to the basal leaves in size, color, and shape, though more lanceolate to egg-shaped. The base of the leaves is tapered and do not have a stalk attaching them to the stem or base of the plant. There will be 4–6 pairs of leaves at the bottom of the flowering stalk with the base of each leaf clasping the stem to having a slight projection of the leaf to each side of the stem (cordate-clasping).

=== Flowers ===
Sidebells penstemon most often blooms from late May to late June. The smooth flowering stems are between 15 and 50 cm (6 and 20 in) in height and usually stand straight upright, but occasionally with a curve at the base. Plants can have multiple flowering stems or just one. The flowering stem is a thyrse with the flowers closely packed on one side with the length covered by flowers being 6–24 cm, occasionally as much as 31 cm. It may have as few as 2 groups of flowers or as many as 12, but usually has between 3 and 10. Within each group there will be two to seven flowers. The bracts near the flowers resemble the leaves, but are ovate 9–70 mm in length and 2–26 mm in width. Each flower is supported by an individual short stem (a peduncle or pedicels) with a smooth texture, like the rest of the stems and leaves.

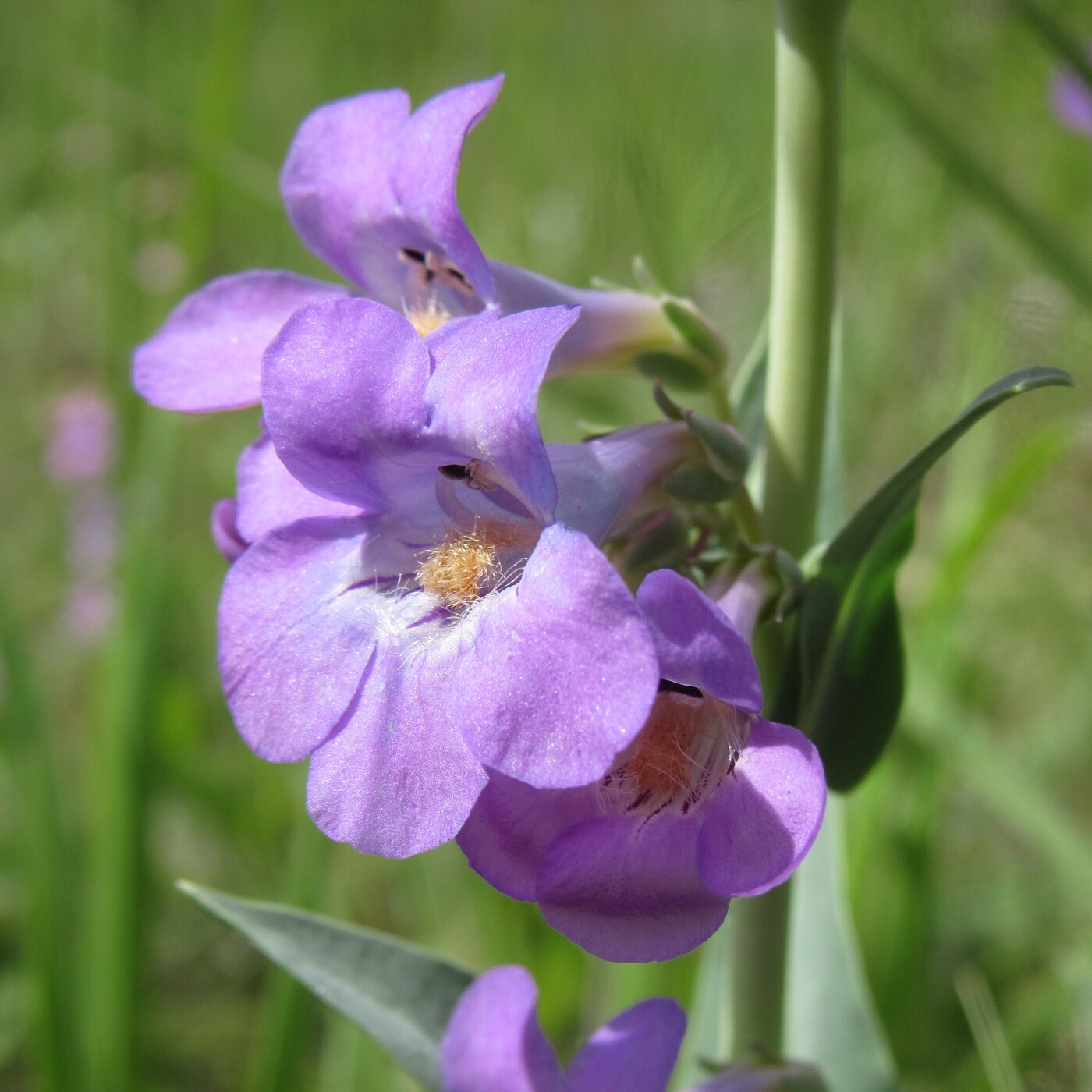
Close up of a flower showing the hairy staminode, photographed in Roosevelt National Forest, Colorado

The flowers have five ovate lobes, two above and three below and a fused funnel shaped flower. The petals and tube of the flower are pastel shades of violet or lavender, sometimes more blue, and rarely pink. The flowers tend to be more pink or orchid colored when budding or recently opened and trend towards blue shades as they age. The outside of the flower is smooth like the rest of the plant, but the inside of flower will sometimes have sparse to dense fine, short, white hairs. As a whole the flower will be 15–25 mm long and a tube width of 8–11 mm and an internal diameter of 4–7 mm. The stamens are most often kept within the tube of the flower, but the longer pair my reach the mouth of the flower tube. The pollen sacs on the stamens are 1–1.4 mm in size with a raised area around the opening slit. The staminode, the sterile stamen, of the flower is 10–13 mm long and may reach the opening of the flower. It has an abruptly recurved tip, divided into two branches, and the dense hairs covering its end are golden yellow and 2 mm long.

The seed capsules are typical of penstemon, four lobed capsules shaped like a teardrop 9–15 mm in length and 7–9 mm in width.

== Taxonomy ==
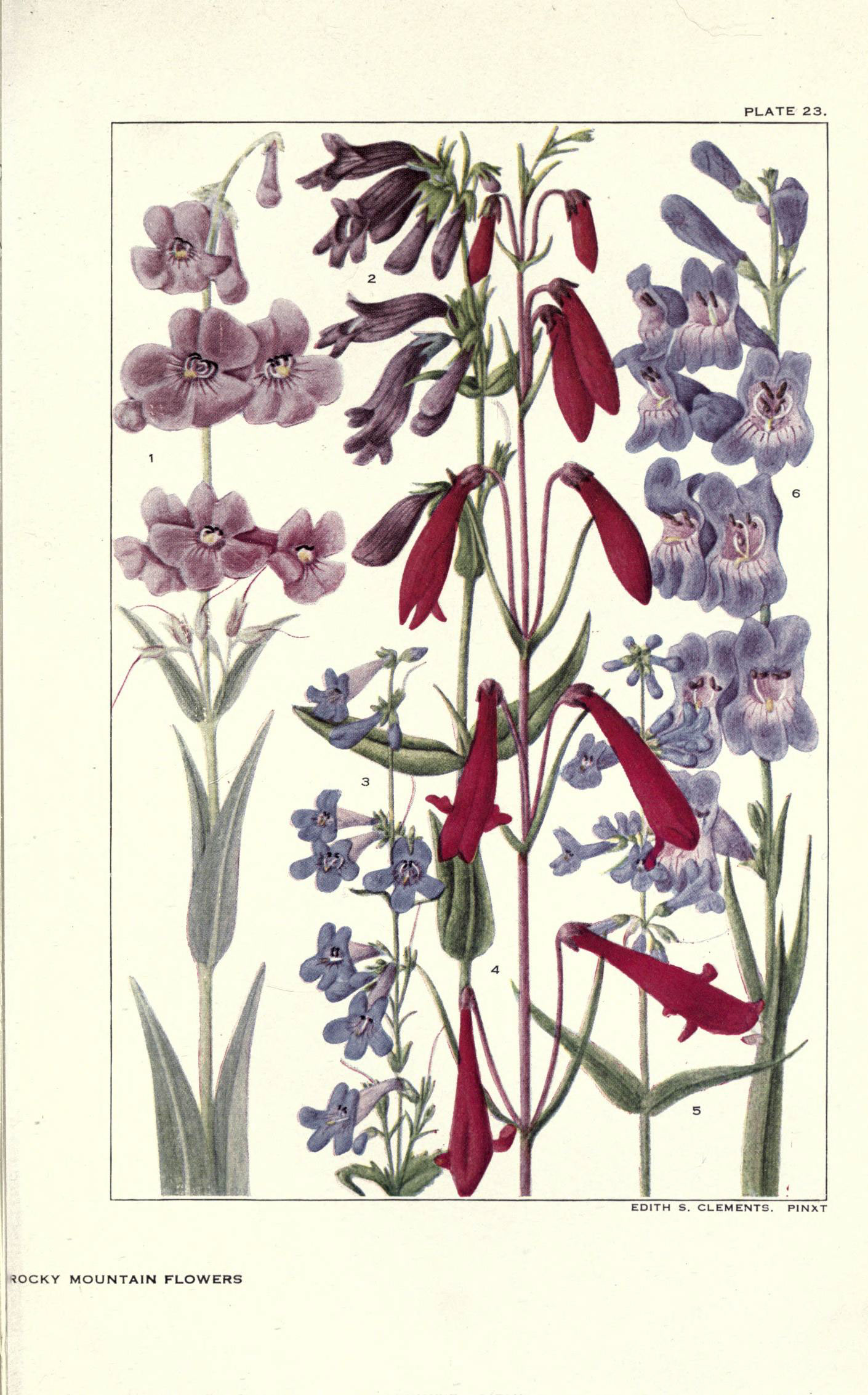
Penstemon secundiflorus, on the left from Rocky Mountain Flowers (1914) as illustrated by Edith Clements

The type specimen of Penstemon secundiflorus was collected by the Fremont expedition in 1842. The type specimen, held in the New York Botanical Garden Herbarium as of 2023, contains very little information about exactly where the specimen was collected during the journey through Nebraska, Colorado, and Wyoming.

It was first described in Prodromus Systematis Naturalis Regni Vegetabilis volume 10 in 1846 by George Bentham as Pentstemon secundiflorus using the mistaken Linnaean correction of John Mitchell's Penstemon.

In 1906 Per Axel Rydberg described a new species, Penstemon unilateralis, in the Bulletin of the Torrey Botanical Club from a collection by Asa Gray in 1878. This was supported by Francis Pennell in his 1920 publication "Scrophulariaceae of the Central Rocky Mountain States". Sometime before publication he also examined the type specimen of P. secundiflorus and he agreed with Bentham's identification.

Pennell also described a dwarf variant of the species he found in South Park, Colorado as Penstemon secundiflorus var. lavendulus. However, it is no longer generally accepted as a subspecies despite the distinctive narrower leaves and noticeable red-violet corollas.

The USDA Natural Resources Conservation Service PLANTS database (PLANTS) still recognizes oneside penstemon (Penstemon unilateralis) as a separate and distinct species. However, the general appearance is almost identical to Penstemon secundiflorus and can only be visually distinguished by the lack of hairs on the staminode and narrower more green colored leaves. Most authorities, including World Flora Online (WFO), Plants of the World Online (POWO), and Flora of North America do not recognize it as a valid species.

The chromosome number for Penstemon secundiflorus is 16 in diploid individuals.

=== Varieties ===
There are two varieties of Penstemon secundiflorus that are accepted by POWO, WFO, and FNA:

==== Penstemon secundiflorus var. secundiflorus ====
The autonymic variety is the more widespread, being found from Wyoming to northern Mexico. Its leaves tend to be more lanceolate, shaped like a spear head with the wider portion towards the base rather than past the midpoint, though both varieties can have egg shaped leaves. It is a typical species of the Front Range of the Rocky Mountains.

==== Penstemon secundiflorus var. versicolor ====
Initially Pennell described Penstemon secundiflorus var. versicolor as a full species, Penstemon versicolor in "Scrophulariaceae of the Central Rocky Mountain States" in 1920. However, Craig C. Freeman of the University of Kansas published it as a variety in 2017 when reviewing Penstemon species for Flora of North America North of Mexico and this classification is used by all authorities except for PLANTS.

The most distinguishing feature of Penstemon secundiflorus var. versicolor is the way an abrupt, mucronate, tip stand out from the end of the leaf. The plants are also on the shorter end of the autonymic subspecies size range, only 20–35 cm tall. They are generally restricted to limestone outcrops and are only reported in two to four counties in south-east Colorado.

There are four synonyms synonyms of the two accepted varieties.

Table of Synonyms
| Name | Year | Rank | Synonym of: | Notes |
|---|---|---|---|---|
| Penstemon secundiflorus var. caudatus A.Nelson | 1909 | variety | var. secundiflorus | = het. |
| Penstemon secundiflorus subsp. lavendulus Pennell | 1920 | subspecies | var. secundiflorus | = het. |
| Penstemon unilateralis Rydb. | 1906 | species | var. secundiflorus | = het. |
| Penstemon versicolor Pennell | 1920 | species | var. versicolor | ≡ hom. |
Notes: ≡ homotypic synonym; = heterotypic synonym

=== Names ===
The species name, secundiflorus, is a common Botanical Latin compound word meaning "flowers all facing one direction" using the prefix secundi- meaning one sided, a reference to the flowers being secund, all facing one direction away from the stem. Penstemon secundiflorus is known by the related common names sidebells penstemon, bearded sidebells penstemon, and one-sided penstemon. It is additionally known as the orchid penstemon, orchid beardtongue, and purple beardtongue, however both Penstemon cobaea var. purpureus and Penstemon pachyphyllus are also called purple beardtongue.

== Range and habitat ==
Penstemon secundiflorus is commonly found growing in rocky, gravelly, and sandy loam soils. Most often they are decomposed granite soils, but occasionally on soils from limestone or sandstone. They mainly grow in scrubby and open forests like Pinon-Juniper-Oak woodlands, Juniper savanna, or open ponderosa-oak woodlands. They also commonly grow in sagebrush grasslands at higher elevations and openings in montane forests. Populations extend outwards onto the plains in some areas of mixed-grass prairie. P. secundiflorus tend to be scattered through its habitat, with two or three plants in each location, rather than forming continuous stands or dense colonies. They are frequently found in roadcuts in their range.

Penstemon secundiflorus is distributed across three US states and two Mexican states. Most of the population is found east of the continental divide in the Rocky Mountains of Wyoming and Colorado, but it is also reported in several western counties of Colorado. In New Mexico populations are found both east and west of the mountains in northern parts of the state. The locations of populations in Mexico are not precisely recorded, but POWO reports it grows in the states of Sonora and Chihuahua.

== Ecology ==
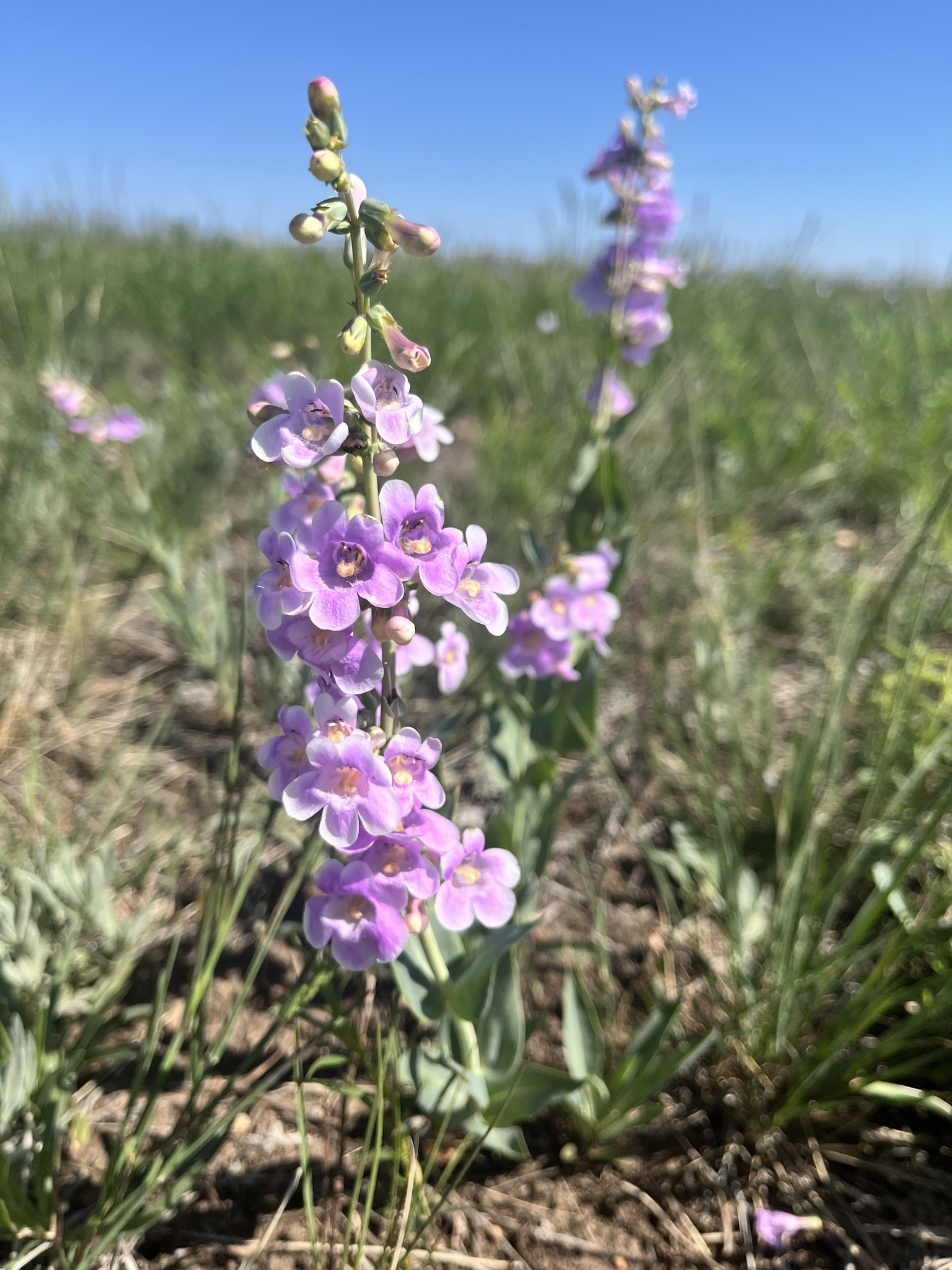
Penstemon secundiflorus, in the Rocky Flats National Wildlife Refuge

Sidebells penstemons has some adaption to disturbance and wildfire. Experiments with seeds show a 1.9 times greater rate of germination when exposed to smoke. They were found in similar numbers both before and five years after the 2002 Hayman Fire in Colorado.

As would be expected from the relatively large and brightly colored flowers, Penstemon secundiflorus has many nectar feeding visitors. Three specific species of butterfly are known to visit them, Atlantis fritillaries (Speyeria atlantis), Rocky Mountain apollos (Parnassius smintheus), and Pahaska skippers (Hesperia pahaska), though swallowtails are also known to visit them. Most of the visitors to P. secundiflorus are bees such as Andrena medionitens, Anthophora terminalis, Anthophora ursina, Bombus bifarius, Bombus melanopygus, Bombus centralis, Bombus occidentalis, Osmia bruneri, Osmia pentstemonis, Hylaeus basalis, Lasioglossum sisymbri, and Lasioglossum trizonatum. The specialist bee Osmia brevis, which is an oligolege that only visits Penstemon flowers, has been observed visiting P. secundiflorus by Frank and Carol Crosswhite. In one field observation bees of the genus Lasioglossum were the most frequent visitors to the flower, but the exact species was undetermined in that study. One false bee, Syrphus opinator, is also known to visit them. The broad-tailed hummingbird, Selasphorus platycercus, also visit P. secundifloris.

As part of its chemical defenses Penstemon secundiflorus contains the iridoid glycoside 10-hydroxy-(5αH)-6-epidihydrocornin. Despite this, the leaves are eaten by the caterpillars of the dotted checkerspot (Poladryas minuta subspecies arachne) when the leaves are new and green.

=== Conservation ===
Sidebells penstemons have not been rated by NatureServe. The species Penstemon secundiflorus was rated by NatureServe in 1999, but this was before the published description of the species included the variety versicolor. The variety secundiflorus has the rating apparently secure variety (T4) from its previous evaluation as a species. The variety versicolor is a vulnerable variety (T3) from its 2024 evaluation.

== Cultivation ==
Sidebells penstemon have a reputation of being easy to grow and possessing showy flowers and good looking rosettes of leaves. They are also valued for the many bees and swallowtail butterflies they will attract to a garden. In gardens they form long lived many-stemmed clumps. Their seeds germinate easily after six weeks of cold and moist stratification.

The sidebells penstemon requires a full sun exposure and well draining soils, rocky or gravelly soils are recommended by Colorado State Extension, though in dry areas they are grown in somewhat clay soils. The plants prefer soils that have not been enriched with fertilizers or organic matter, a common attribute of penstemons. Though quite adapted to dry conditions they have difficulty when tightly packed with other plants. They used in rock gardens, xeric plantings, meadow gardens, and other naturalistic garden types.

In cultivation sidebells penstemon are grown in areas as cold as USDA Hardiness Zone 4, −34 to −29 °C (−30 to −20 °F), or as warm as zone 7, −18 to −12 °C (0 to 10 °F).

== See also ==
- List of Penstemon species
