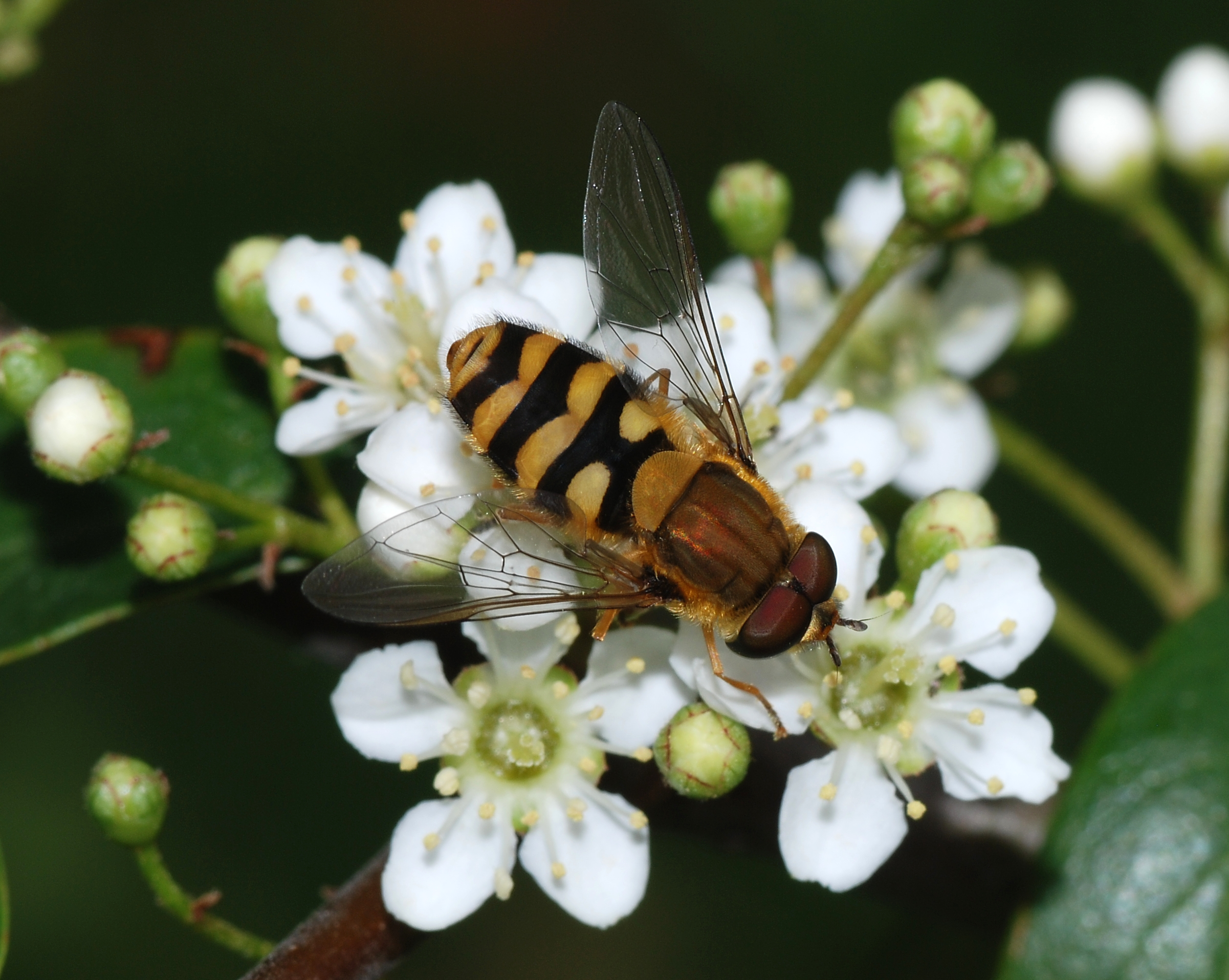
- Syrphus ribesii male

Scientific classification
- Kingdom: Animalia
- Phylum: Arthropoda
- Class: Insecta
- Order: Diptera
- Family: Syrphidae
- Tribe: Syrphini
- Genus: Syrphus; Fabricius, 1775

Type species
- Musca ribesii Linnaeus, 1758

Synonyms
- Syrphidis Goffe, 1933

= Syrphus =

Genus of flies

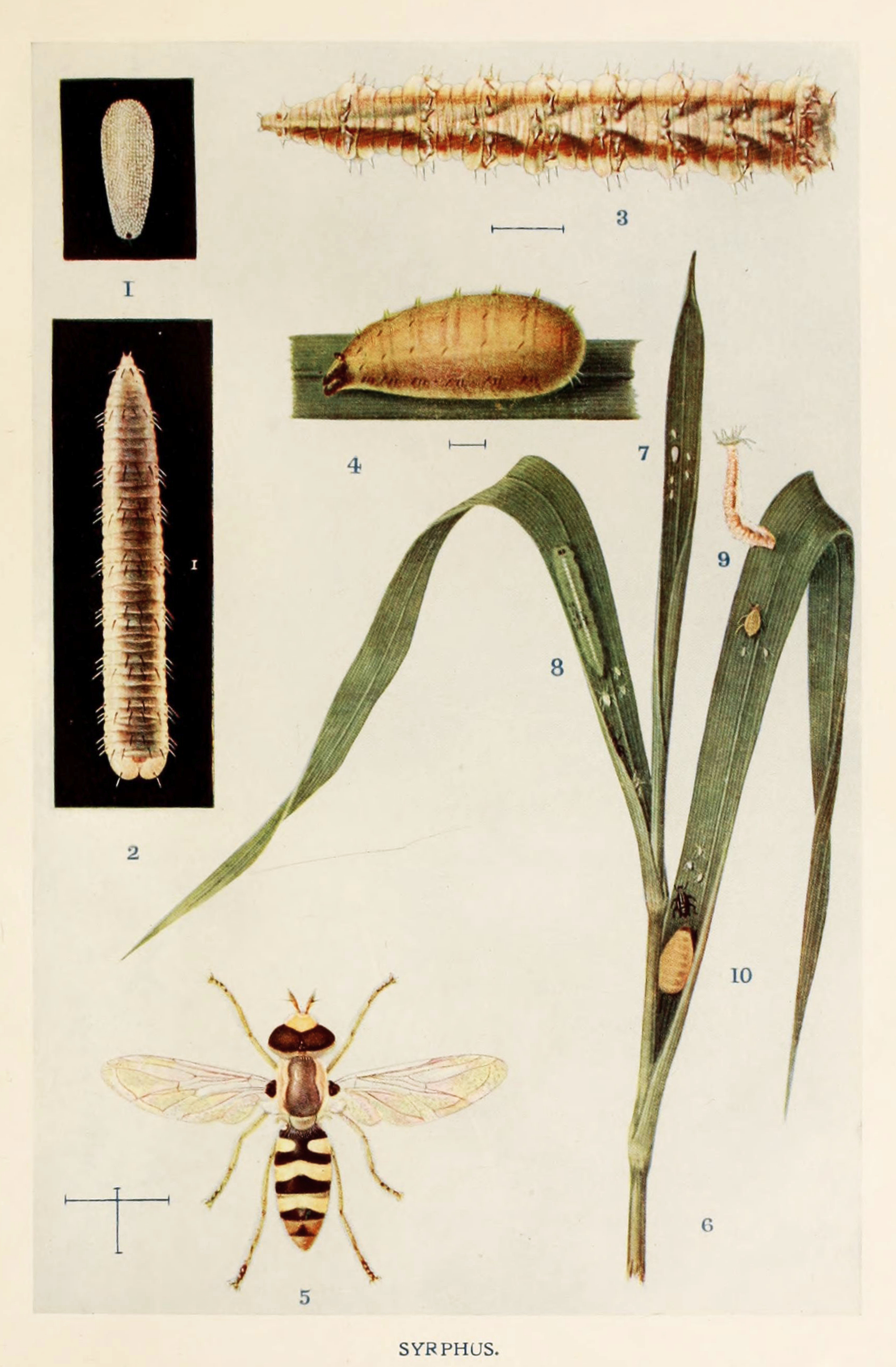
Image by Harold Maxwell-Lefroy - Life history of Syrphus

Syrphus is a genus of hoverflies. It can be distinguished from other genera of the tribe Syrphini because it is the only genus that has long hairs on the upper surface of the lower lobe of the calypter (as well as hairs on the rear margin of the calypter as in most Syrphini).

== Species ==
- Syrphus annulifemur Mutin, 1997
- Syrphus attenuatus Hine, 1922
- Syrphus currani Fluke, 1939
- Syrphus dimidiatus Macquart, 1834
- Syrphus doesburgi Goot, 1964
- Syrphus intricatus Vockeroth, 1983
- Syrphus knabi Shannon, 1916
- Syrphus laceyorum Thompson, 2000
- Syrphus monoculus (Swederus, 1787)
- Syrphus nitidifrons (Becker, 1921)
- Syrphus opinator Osten Sacken, 1877
- Syrphus octomaculatus Walker, 1837
- S. phaeostigma Wiedemann, 1830
- Syrphus rectus Osten Sacken, 1875
- Syrphus ribesii (Linnaeus, 1758)
- Syrphus sexmaculatus (Zetterstedt, 1838)
- Syrphus sonorensis Vockeroth, 1983
- Syrphus torvus Osten Sacken, 1875
- Syrphus vitripennis Meigen, 1822
