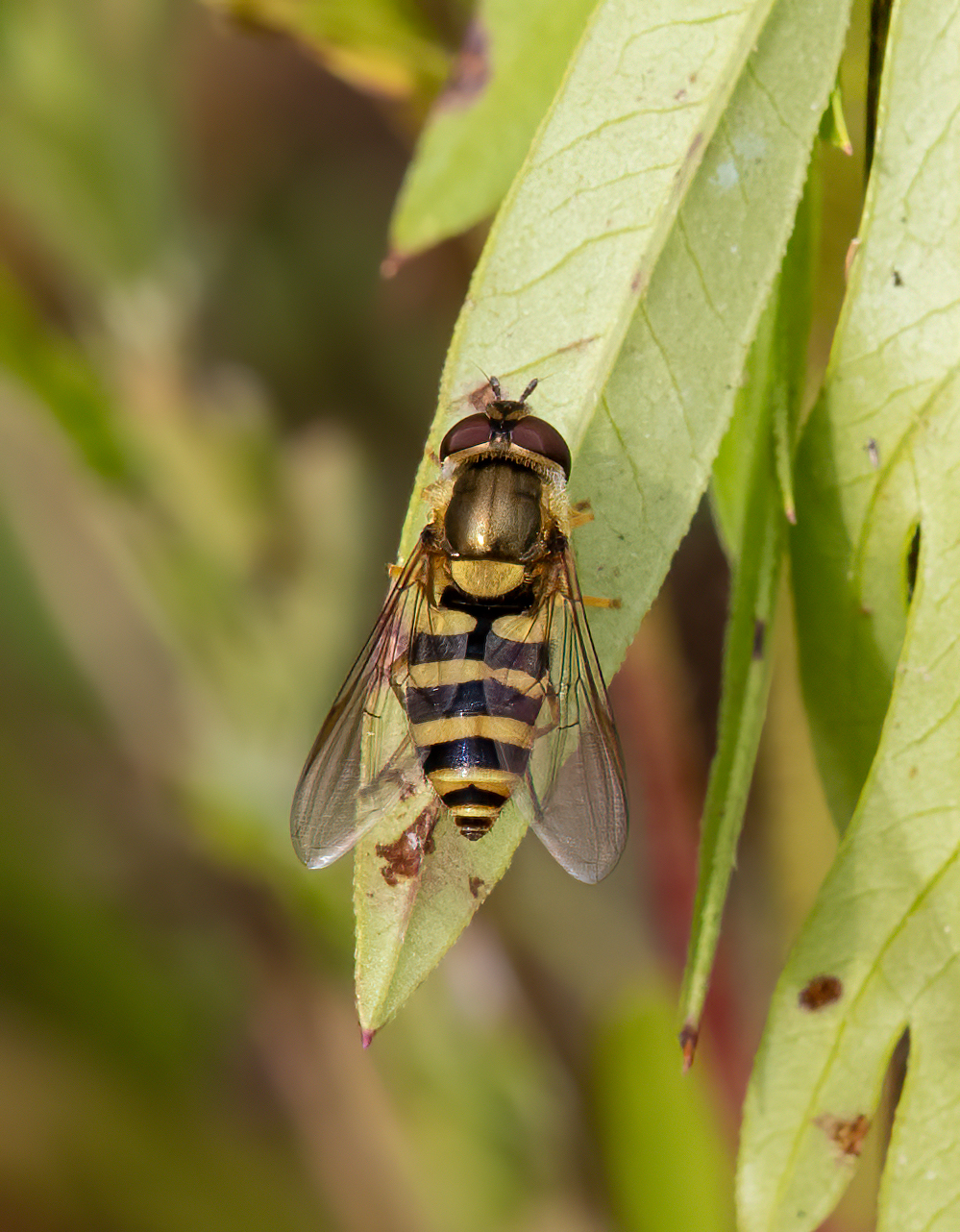

Scientific classification
- Kingdom: Animalia
- Phylum: Arthropoda
- Class: Insecta
- Order: Diptera
- Family: Syrphidae
- Genus: Syrphus
- Species: S. rectus

Binomial name
- Syrphus rectus Osten-Sacken, 1875

= Syrphus rectus =

Species of fly

Syrphus rectus, the yellow-legged flower fly, is a species of fly in the family Syrphidae, the hover flies. Syrphus rectus is a common fly in the eastern United States and southeastern Canada and has occasionally been seen in Europe. Like many hoverflies, it has strongly contrasting black and yellow bands on the abdomen.

The adults visit the flowers of plants in the sunflower family (Asteraceae) and the larvae feed on aphids. The yellow-legged flower fly flies between April and November.
