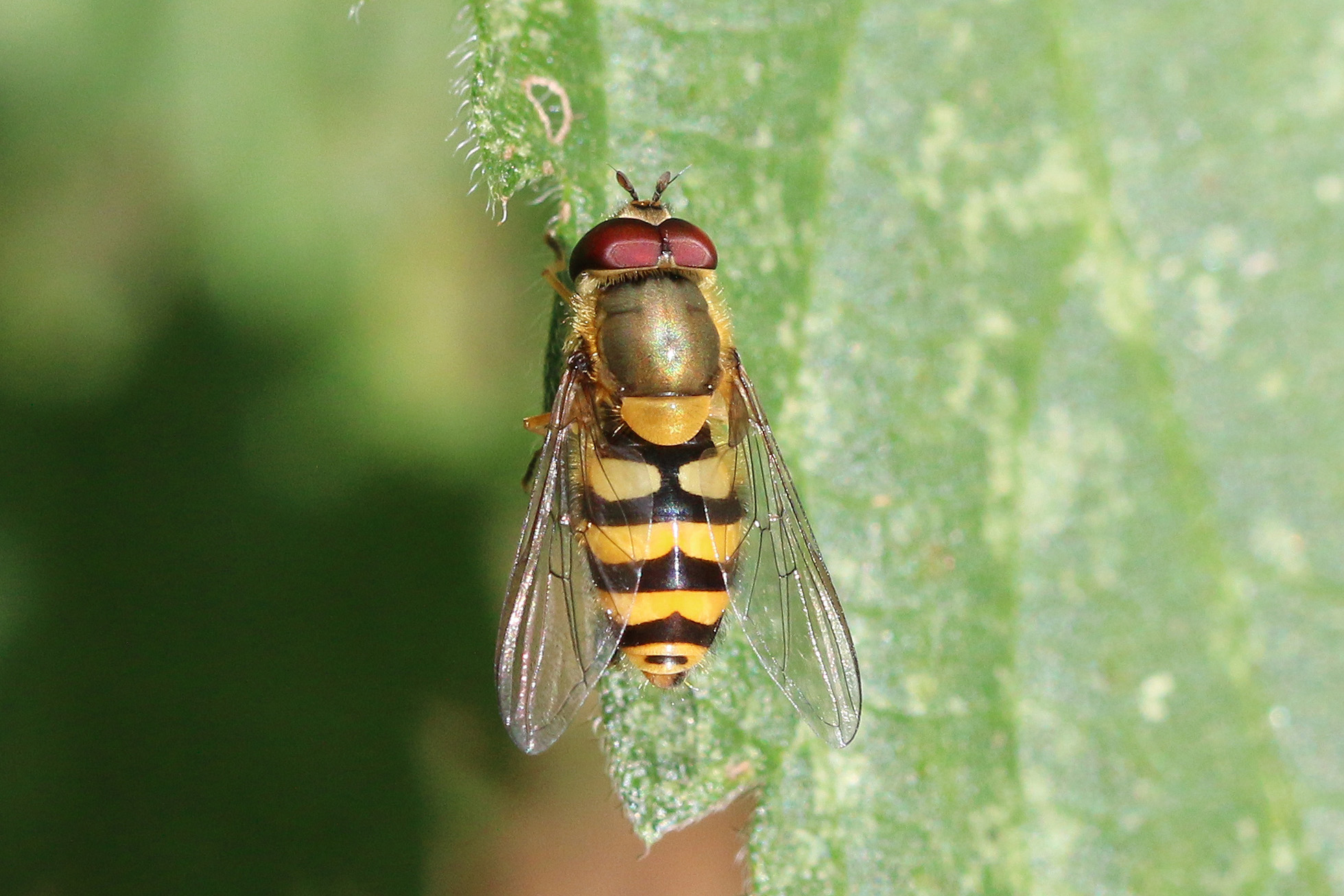
- Male
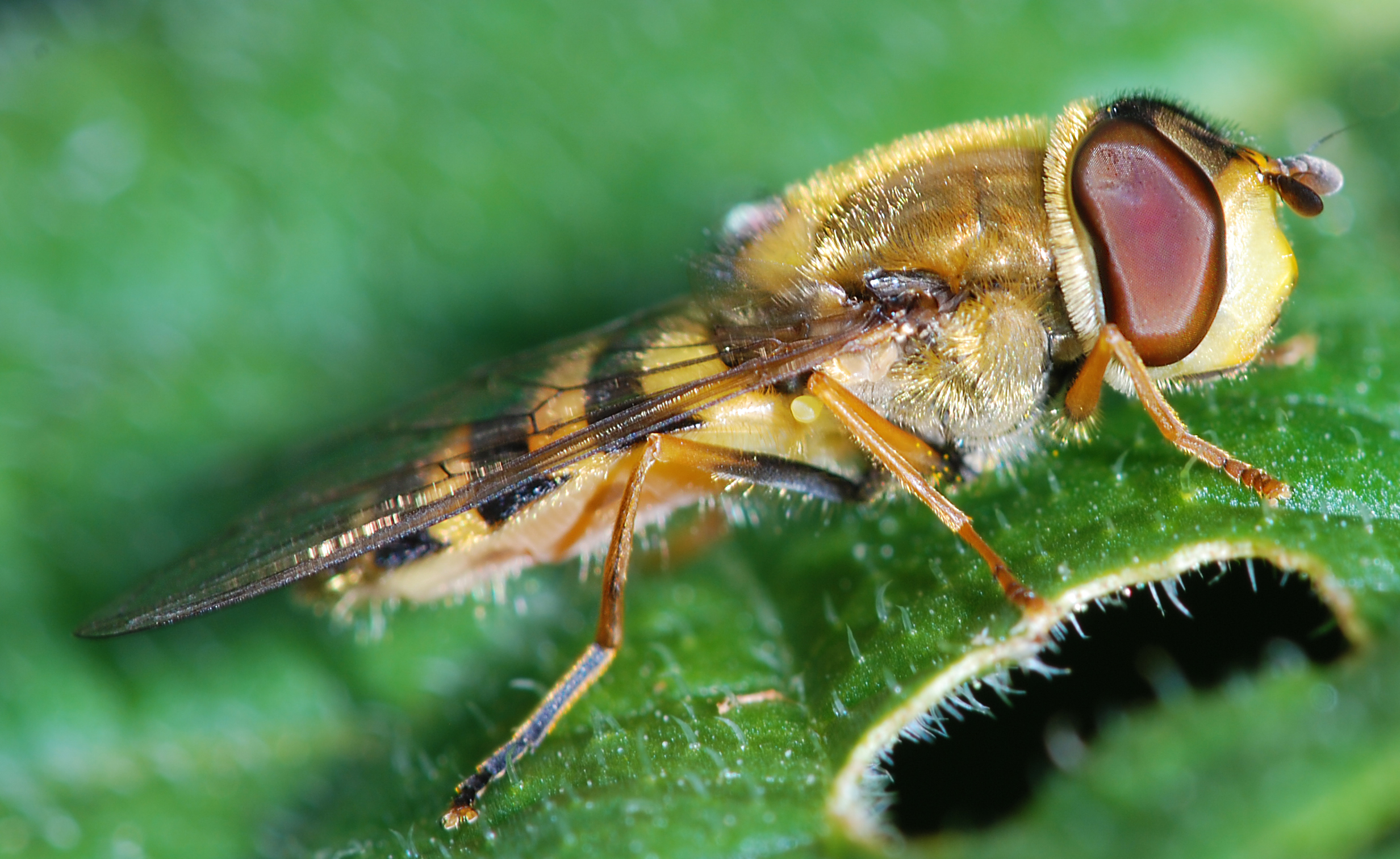
- Female

Scientific classification
- Kingdom: Animalia
- Phylum: Arthropoda
- Class: Insecta
- Order: Diptera
- Family: Syrphidae
- Genus: Syrphus
- Species: S. vitripennis

Binomial name
- Syrphus vitripennis Meigen, 1822

= Syrphus vitripennis =

Species of hoverfly

Syrphus vitripennis is a very common European and North American species of hoverfly. Its larvae feed on aphids

== Description ==
For terms see Morphology of Diptera
Wing length 7·25-10·25 mm. Frons above lunulae black. Tergites 3 and 4 with entire yellow bands and lateral margin of tergites black. Male: femora 3 black for basal three-quarters. Female: femora 3 black on basal two-thirds. The male genitalia and the larva are figured by Dusek and Laska (1964). See references for determination.

== Distribution ==
Palearctic throughout. Nearctic Alaska to California. Migratory.

== Biology ==
Habitat: Deciduous and coniferous woodland and anthropophilic, occurring along field hedges, in suburban gardens and parks. Flies March to October.
