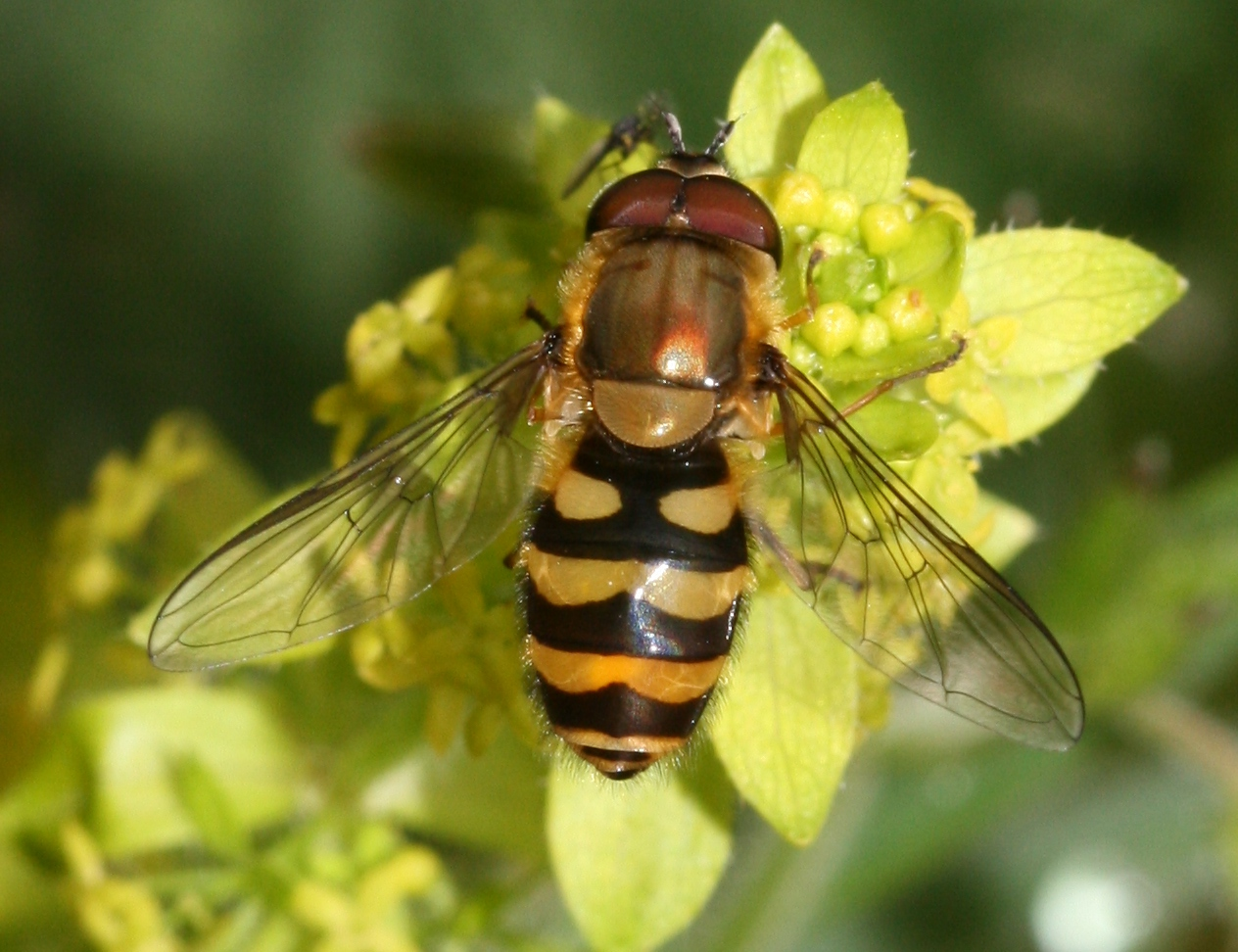
- male
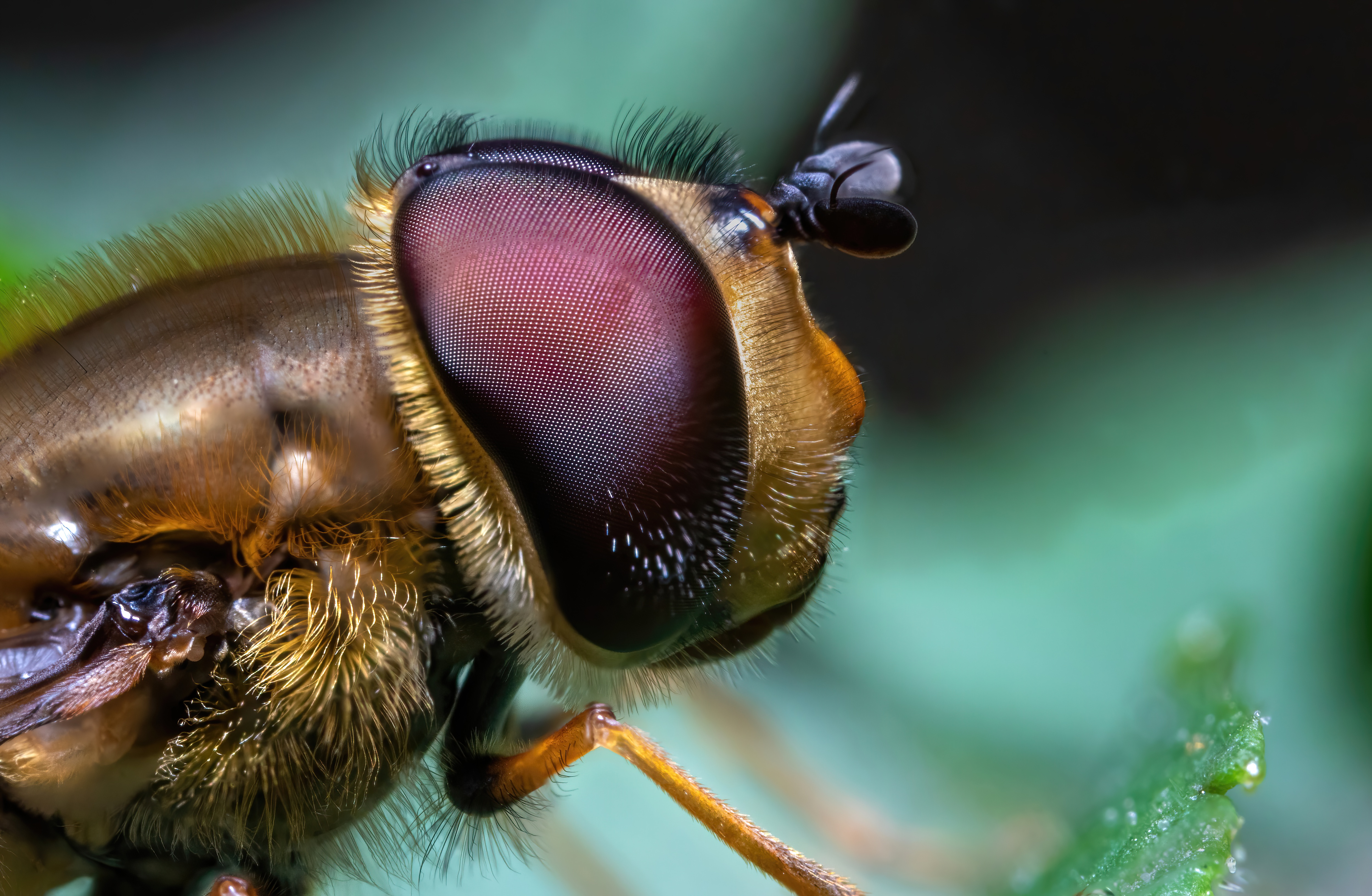
- macro image

Scientific classification
- Kingdom: Animalia
- Phylum: Arthropoda
- Class: Insecta
- Order: Diptera
- Family: Syrphidae
- Subfamily: Syrphinae
- Tribe: Syrphini
- Genus: Syrphus
- Species: S. torvus

Binomial name
- Syrphus torvus Osten Sacken, 1875

= Syrphus torvus =

Species of insect

Syrphus torvus, the Hairy-eyed Flower Fly, is a common species of hoverfly found in the Holarctic. The adults feed on pollen and nectar, but the larvae feed on aphids.

== Description ==
External images. For terminology see Speight key to genera and glossary.
Eyes have numerous hairs, in male, long and dense, in female shorter. Femora 3 is black on basal 3/4. The male genitalia and the larva are illustrated by Dusek and Laska (1964).
See references for determination.

== Distribution ==
Palearctic: Greenland and Fennoscandia southward to Iberia and the Mediterranean basin through Europe into Turkey and European Russia. Also from Urals eastward to Siberia and the Russian Far East to the Pacific coast (Kuril Isles) and Japan. Indomalaya Formosa, Northern India, Nepal, and Thailand.

Nearctic: from Alaska southward to New Mexico. Migratory. Large numbers of hoverflies of this species and of Metasyrphus sp. have been observed on Denali in the Rocky Mountains at altitudes of 5,000 metres (16,000 ft) at the head of the Kahiltna Glacier.

== Biology ==
Habitat: Abies, Picea and Pinus forest and Betula, Fagus, Quercus forest and dwarf-shrub tundra. It is synanthropic in suburban gardens with mature trees and in urban parks. Flowers visited include umbellifers, Allium ursinum, Aster, Bellis perennis, Brassica rapa, Buxus, Caltha, Cirsium arvense, Crataegus, Euphorbia, Frangula alnus, Glaux maritima, Hedera, Hieracium, Oxalis, Prunus spinosa, Ranunculus, Rosa, Rubus, Salix, Senecio jacobaea, Sorbus, Taraxacum, Tussilago. It flies March to October. The larva feeds on aphids on trees, bushes and shrubs. Adults feed on pollen and nectar and are particularly attracted to yellow and white flowers. The insect overwinters as larvae.
