= Andrena medionitens =

Scientific classification
- Domain: Eukaryota
- Kingdom: Animalia
- Phylum: Arthropoda
- Class: Insecta
- Order: Hymenoptera
- Family: Andrenidae
- Genus: Andrena
- Species: A. medionitens

Binomial name
- Andrena medionitens Cockerell, 1902

Miner bee species in the family Andrenidae

The western red-legged miner bee (Andrena medionitens) is a species of miner bee in the family Andrenidae. It is found in North America.
