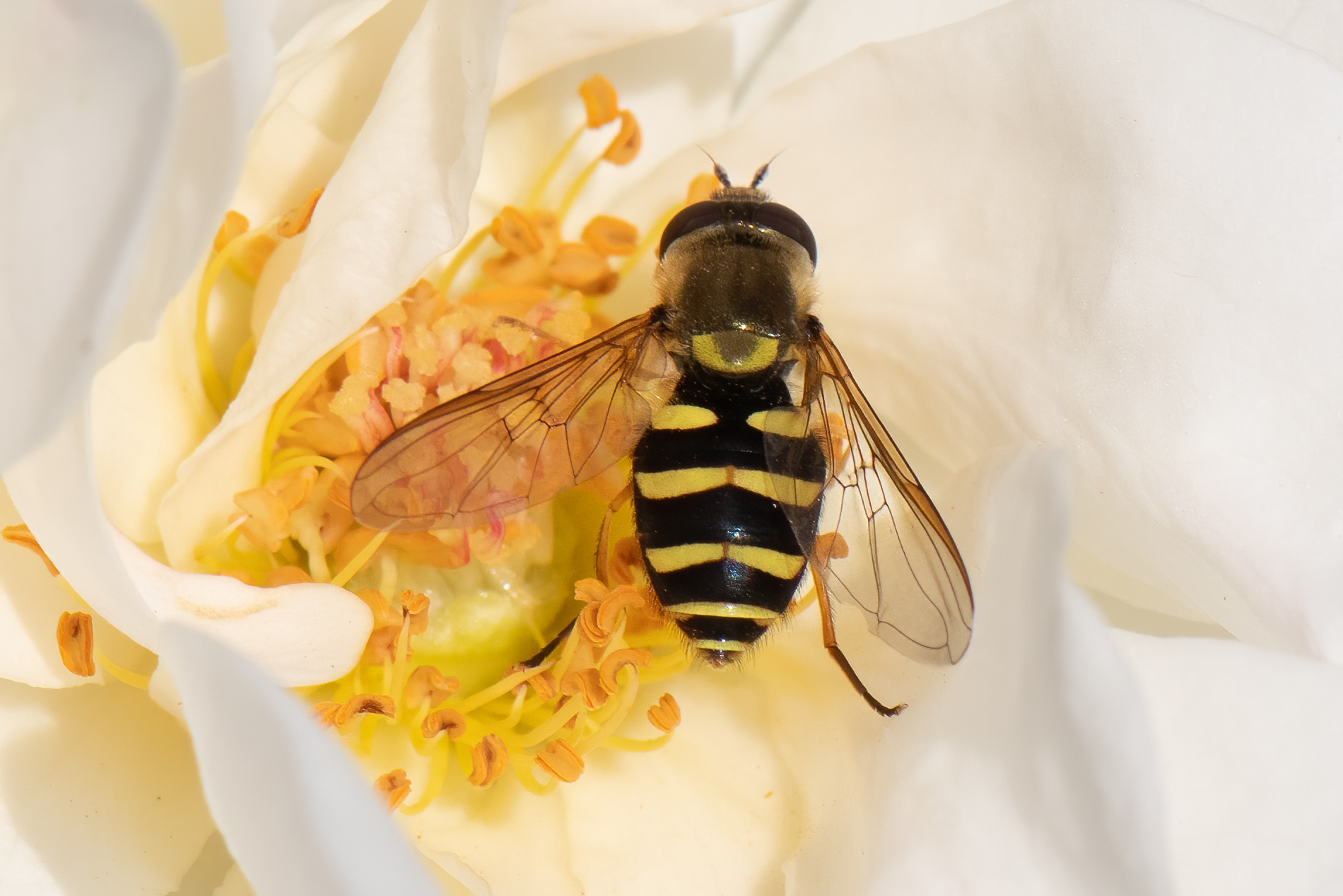

Scientific classification
- Kingdom: Animalia
- Phylum: Arthropoda
- Class: Insecta
- Order: Diptera
- Family: Syrphidae
- Tribe: Syrphini
- Genus: Syrphus
- Species: S. opinator

Binomial name
- Syrphus opinator Osten Sacken, 1877

= Syrphus opinator =

Species of fly

Syrphus opinator, the black-margined flower fly, is a species of syrphid fly in the family Syrphidae.

Black-margined Flower fles on Zinnia flowers. A portion in close-up is played at one-fifth speed.
