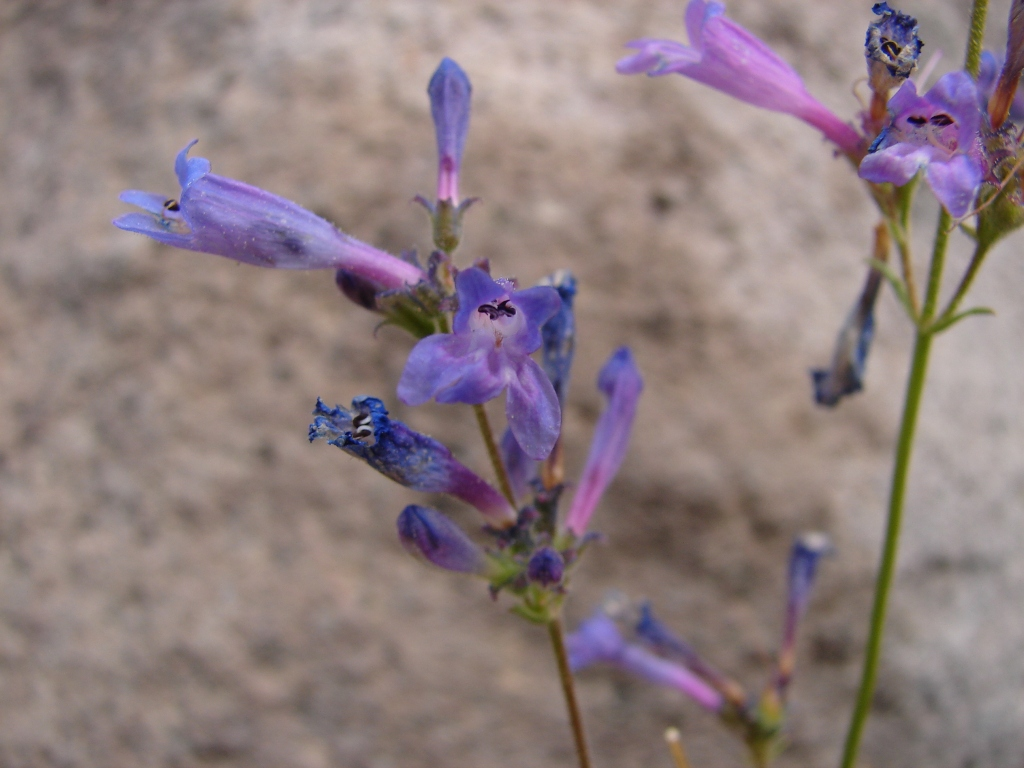

Conservation status
- Apparently Secure (NatureServe)

Scientific classification
- Kingdom: Plantae
- Clade: Tracheophytes
- Clade: Angiosperms
- Clade: Eudicots
- Clade: Asterids
- Order: Lamiales
- Family: Plantaginaceae
- Genus: Penstemon
- Species: P. gracilentus

Binomial name
- Penstemon gracilentus A.Gray

Synonyms
- Penstemon gracilentus var. ursorum Jeps.

= Penstemon gracilentus =

Plant species in the veronica family

Penstemon gracilentus is a species of penstemon known by the common name slender penstemon. It is native to the mountains and sagebrush plateau of northeastern California, western Nevada, and eastern Oregon, where it grows in forest, woodland, and scrub habitat. It is a herb producing upright branches to about 65 centimeters in maximum height, the stems developing woody bases. The leaves are up to 10 centimeters in length and linear or lance-shaped. The glandular inflorescence produces several tubular purple flowers up to 2 centimeters long. The mouth of each flower may be hairless or coated in long hairs, and the staminode usually has a coat of yellow hairs.

== Description ==
Slender penstemon is a herbaceous plant that will grow 20 to 65 centimeters (8 to 26 in) tall. It will usually have several stems that either grow straight upwards or outwards before curving to grow upwards from a branched and woody caudex. The stems can be hairless or covered in stiff backwards facing hairs, occasionally they may be covered in natural waxes. It is a perennial plant and long lived, for a penstemon.

The leaves are mostly cauline, attached to the stems of the plant, with basal leaves absent or nearly so from the base of the plant. The leaves are attached on opposite sides of the stem with each stem bearing three to ten pairs, though usually more than six. Lower leaves are oblanceolate to spatulate, like a reversed spear head or spoon shaped with the widest part of the leaf past the midpoint. Upper leaves are narrowly lanceolate, like a thin spear head, or linear like a grass blade. They can measure 2 to 10.5 centimeters in length, but generally are 4 to 8 cm. Their width ranges from 0.2 to 1.5 cm. The leaf edges are smooth and the surface hairless, but sometimes glaucous, covered in gray-blue natural waxes.

The uppermost 3 to 28 centimeters of a stem is an inflorescence with between three and nine groups of flowers. Each group has a pair of cymes with two to seven flowers on branched pedicels.

== Taxonomy ==
Penstemon gracilentus was scientifically described and named by Asa Gray in 1858. It is part of the large Penstemon in the Plantaginaceae family. It has no valid subspecies or varieties. Its one botanical synonym is Penstemon gracilentus var. ursorum, a variety described by Willis Linn Jepson in 1925 that is not accepted by Plants of the World Online.

=== Names ===
In English it is known by the common name slender penstemon.

== Range and habitat ==
Slender penstemon is native to three western states, Nevada, Oregon, and California. In California it is found in the northeast in the high Sierra Nevada, the Cascade Range and its foothills, the Modoc Plateau, and the Warner Mountains. In Nevada it is only known from the far western edge of the state in Douglas, Carson City, and Washoe counties. In eastern Oregon it is recorded in four widely separated counties, Jackson, Lake, Wasco, and Baker.

It is associated with sagebrush scrub, juniper woodlands, yellow-pine forests, and subalpine forests. In sagebrush areas it is often associated with soils derived from lava flows or granite.

=== Conservation ===
In 1988 NatureServe evaluated Penstemon gracilentus and rated it as apparently secure (G4). They rate it as vulnerable (S3) in Nevada and have not evaluated the rest of its range.
