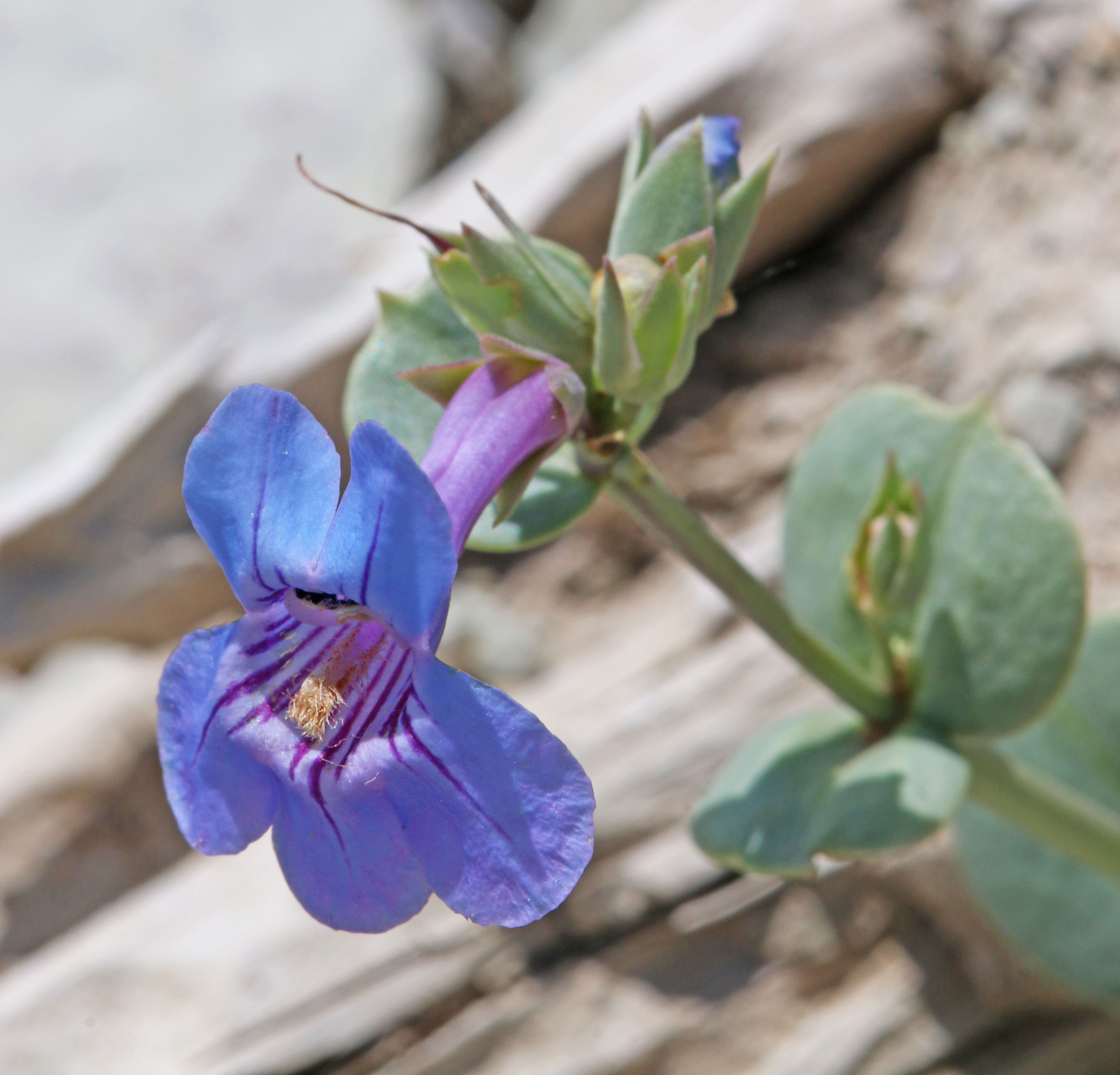

Conservation status
- Secure (NatureServe)

Scientific classification
- Kingdom: Plantae
- Clade: Tracheophytes
- Clade: Angiosperms
- Clade: Eudicots
- Clade: Asterids
- Order: Lamiales
- Family: Plantaginaceae
- Genus: Penstemon
- Species: P. pachyphyllus

Binomial name
- Penstemon pachyphyllus A.Gray ex Rydb.

= Penstemon pachyphyllus =

Species of flowering plant

Penstemon pachyphyllus is a species of flowering plant in the plantain family known by the common name thickleaf beardtongue. It is native to the western United States, particularly the Great Basin.

This species is a perennial herb growing up to 65 centimeters tall. The leaves are fleshy and smooth-edged. The flowers are blue to shades of purple. The staminode is very hairy.
