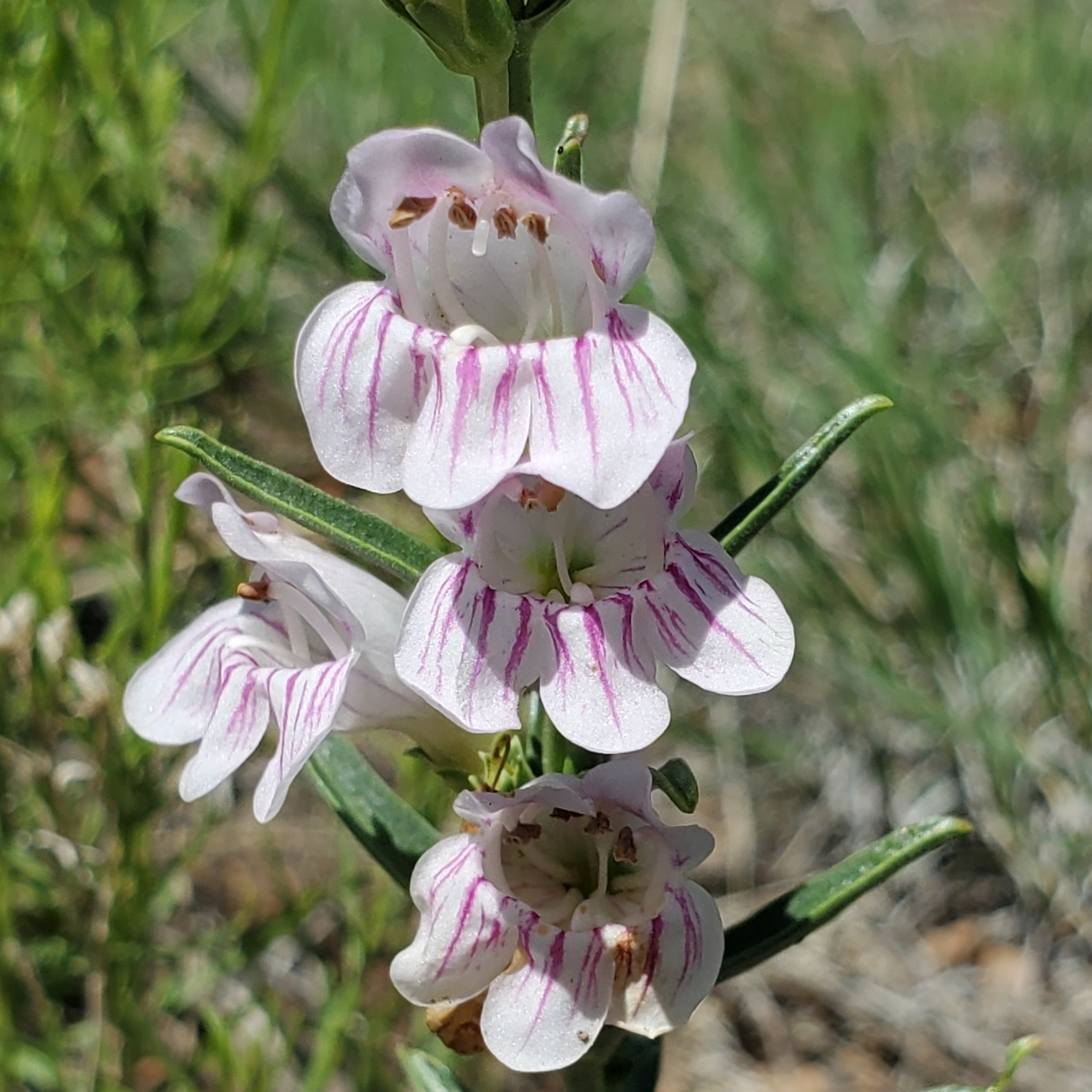
- Bandelier National Monument, Los Alamos County, New Mexico

Scientific classification
- Kingdom: Plantae
- Clade: Tracheophytes
- Clade: Angiosperms
- Clade: Eudicots
- Clade: Asterids
- Order: Lamiales
- Family: Plantaginaceae
- Genus: Penstemon
- Species: P. virgatus

Binomial name
- Penstemon virgatus A.Gray

Varieties
- P. virgatus var. asa-grayi (Crosswh.) Dorn; P. virgatus var. virgatus

= Penstemon virgatus =

Plant species in the veronica family

Penstemon virgatus, the wandbloom penstemon, is a species of flowering plant from western North America. It grows as far south as southwestern Mexico and as far north as southern Wyoming. It is part of the large Penstemon genus in the veronica family.

== Description ==
The wandbloom penstemon is a herbaceous plant that can grow 12 to 90 centimeters (5 to 35 in), but more commonly is between 20 and 60 cm (8 and 24 in) tall. It is a perennial plant, but short lived. Plants can have one or more flowering stems. The stems may be puberulent, covered in fine downy hairs, or may be smooth, but are not waxy.

Plants always have cauline leaves, ones that are attached to the stems, and will sometimes also have basal leaves, ones that grow directly from the base of the plant. If the stems are hairless the leaves will be hairless as well, but if the stems have fine hairs the leaves will usually be somewhat similarly covered. Rarely they may be slightly glaucous, covered in blue-gray waxes. The lowest leaves on the stem and the basal leaves, if present, measure 2 to 11.4 centimeters long, though usually more than 6 cm. They are much narrower, most often 1.2 to 2.1 cm in width, though sometimes as little as 3 millimeters. Commonly they are lanceolate or oblanceolate, shaped like a spear's head or reversed, but rarely they are linear resembling a blade of grass. The stems will have five to eleven pairs of sessile leaves attached to opposite sides. The ones higher up on the stems will be 4 to 11.8 cm long and 3 to 17 mm in width and are also lanceolate.

The flowering stem is long and wand-like with the flowers secund, all facing one direction. The inflorescence is usually 6 to 40 centimeters (2 to 16 in), but occasionally will just be just 3 cm at the top of the stem. It can have as many as 14 or as few as 3 groups of flowers, cymes, with two to five flowers to each cyme. The flowers are two lipped with three rounded lobes to the lower one and two on the upper, the lower lobes might be bent backwards. The flowers come in a spectrum of colors including pallid white, pink, blue, faded lavender, and purple. They have dark purple-red nectar guide lines on the lower lip.

Penstemon virgatus is very similar to Penstemon secundiflorus which also grows in the southern Rocky Mountains, however the staminode is hairless in this species and hairy in P. secundiflorus.

== Taxonomy ==
Penstemon virgatus is classified in genus Penstemon in the family Plantaginaceae. It was scientifically described and named by Asa Gray in 1859 with the then common spelling of Pentstemon. The specimens used to describe the species were collected in the mountains near Santa Rita del Cobre in New Mexico by John Milton Bigelow and Charles Wright as part of the United States and Mexican Boundary Survey. It was also collected by Samuel Washington Woodhouse.

Apparent natural hybrids with salmon, pink-lavender, or pink flowers in New Mexico of Penstemon barbatus are likely a cross with this species.

=== Varieties ===
There are two varieties of the species.

==== Penstemon virgatus var. asa-grayi ====
This variety was first described by Frank Samuel Crosswhite as a subspecies in 1965 and named to honor the botanist Asa Gray. Many specimens in herbariums had previously been labeled as Penstemon unilateralis, a name that is synonymous with Penstemon secundiflorus due to the type specimen being a member of that species. Crosswhite identified the misidentified plants as P. virgatus. It was reclassified as a variety in 1988 by Robert Donald Dorn. It is distinguished by its glabrous, smooth and hairless, stems and having largely hairless leaves.

It grows along the Front Range starting in Wyoming and then southward in the Rocky Mountains of Colorado into Mora County, New Mexico. It can be found at elevations of 1,400 to 3,000 meters (4,600 to 9,800 ft) on sandy or gravelly hillsides in pine forests and scrub oak woodlands. It will also colonize roadsides. The single specimen found in Sublette County, Wyoming is thought to be an escapee from cultivation by the author of its entry in the Flora of North America. This variety is sometimes known as the tall one-side penstemon.

==== Penstemon virgatus var. virgatus ====
The autonymic variety of the species occurs mainly in northern Arizona and New Mexico in the US and is the variety that is found in the Mexican states of San Luis Potosí, Colima, and Jalisco. Its stems are covered in fine, short hairs and so are its leaves.

In Arizona it grow on the South Rim of the Grand Canyon to the Coconino Plateau near Flagstaff and has been reported once from the Kaibab Plateau. In New Mexico it grows in the north and west of the state.

=== Names ===
Penstemon virgatus is most often known by the common name wandbloom penstemon . It is also known as upright blue penstemon and varied penstemon.

== Range and habitat ==
Penstemon virgatus is native to North America and grows in both the United States and Mexico. In the US it grows in the states of Wyoming, Colorado, New Mexico, and Arizona. In Mexico its range is widely separated from the US. It is found in two discontiguous areas, Colima and Jalisco in the southwest and San Luis Potosí in the northeast.

The species favors well draining areas such as rocky or gravelly hillsides. However, it is noted for its tolerance of heavier soils and being saturated during the spring provided it dry at other times. It is associated with openings in scrub oak woodlands and pine forests as well as with higher altitude grasslands.

== Ecology ==
It is a host species for the caterpillars of the arachne checkerspot butterfly (Poladryas arachne) and the variable checkerspot (Euphydryas chalcedona).

== Cultivation ==
Wandbloom penstemon is particularly noted for its use in high altitude gardens, but is easy to grow and has been planted far outside its natural range in the United States. Its seeds do not require cold stratification to sprout.

== See also ==
- List of Penstemon species
