= P. flavescens =

P. flavescens may refer to:

- Pantala flavescens, the most widespread dragonfly
- Pappophorum flavescens, a pappus grass
- Paracles flavescens, a Brazilian moth
- Paraclione flavescens, a sea angel
- Paradelphomyia flavescens, a crane fly
- Parapercis flavescens, a bony fish
- Paraxanthias flavescens, a mud crab
- Parazuphium flavescens, a ground beetle
- Parsonsia flavescens, a woody vine
- Pelias flavescens, a venomous viper
- Penstemon flavescens, a flowering plant
- Pentanychus flavescens, a daddy longlegs
- Peperomia flavescens, a radiator plant
- Perca flavescens, a freshwater fish
- Pergularia flavescens, a perennial herb
- Perognathus flavescens, a North American rodent
- Peyssonnelia flavescens, a red algae
- Peziza flavescens, an apothecial fungus
- Phalera flavescens, an Asian moth
- Phaseolus flavescens, a wild bean
- Phiale flavescens, a jumping spider
- Phoradendron flavescens, a mistletoe native to the Americas
- Phragmatobia flavescens, a South American moth
- Phryneta flavescens, a flat-faced longhorn beetle
- Pipistrellus flavescens, a vesper bat
- Plagiometriona flavescens, a leaf beetle
- Plastingia flavescens, a skipper butterfly
- Pleiocarpa flavescens, a plant with fragrant flowers
- Plexippoides flavescens, a jumping spider
- Plutodes flavescens, a geometer moth
- Poecilopeplus flavescens, a longhorn beetle
- Pogonognathellus flavescens, a hexapod with internal mouthparts
- Procanace flavescens, a beach fly
- Promalactis flavescens, a Chinese moth
- Psaltoda flavescens, a cicada native to Queensland
- Pseudauchenipterus flavescens, a driftwood catfish
- Pseudomonas flavescens, a Gram-negative bacterium
- Psilopa flavescens, a shore fly
- Pterandra flavescens, a flowering plant
- Puccinia flavescens, a plant pathogen
- Pulvinaria flavescens, a scale insect
- Pycnonotus flavescens, an Asian songbird
- Pycreus flavescens, a papyrus sedge
