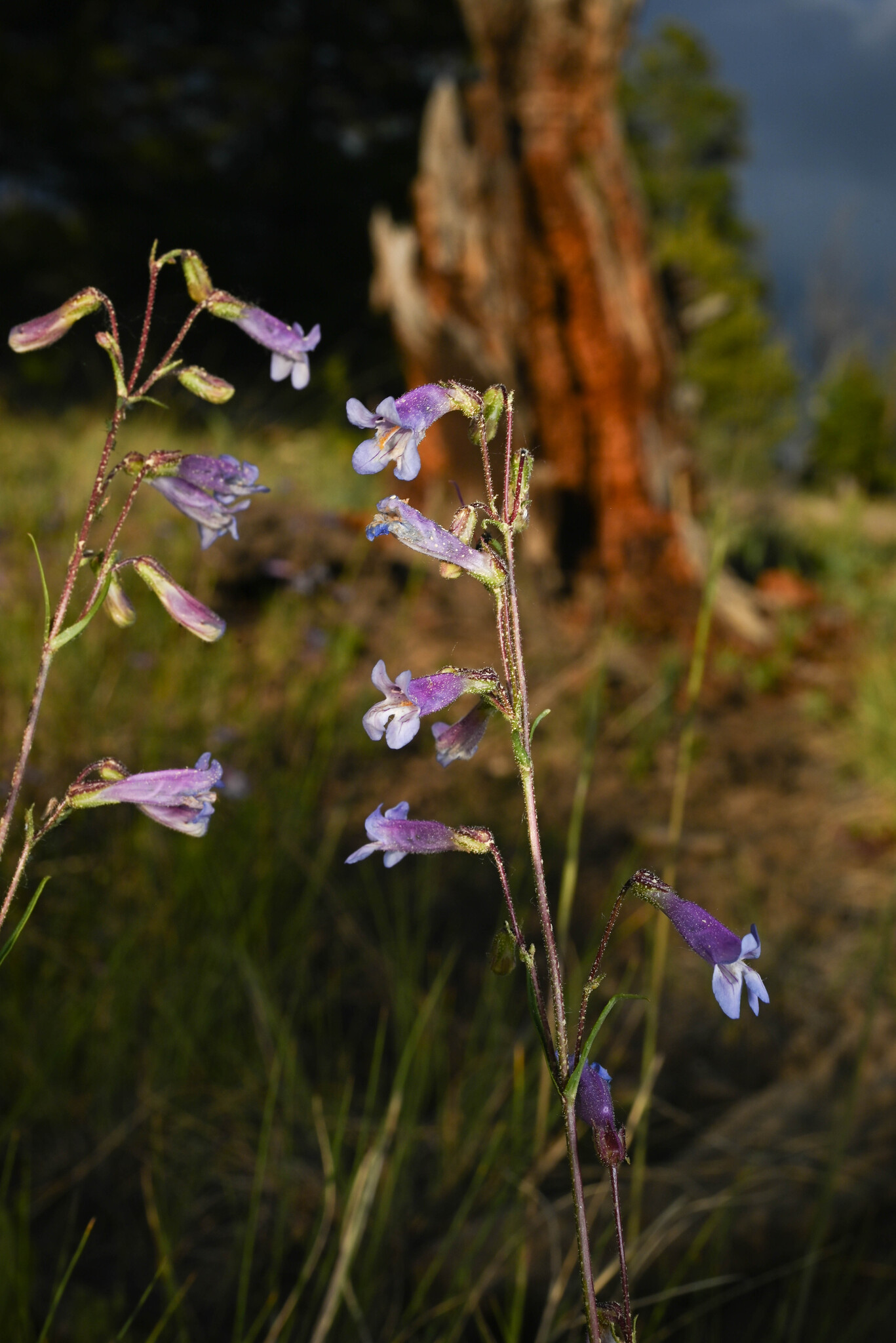

Conservation status
- Vulnerable (NatureServe)

Scientific classification
- Kingdom: Plantae
- Clade: Tracheophytes
- Clade: Angiosperms
- Clade: Eudicots
- Clade: Asterids
- Order: Lamiales
- Family: Plantaginaceae
- Genus: Penstemon
- Species: P. griffinii

Binomial name
- Penstemon griffinii A.Nelson

= Penstemon griffinii =

Plant species in the veronica family

Penstemon griffinii, commonly called Griffin's penstemon, is a species of plant in the veronica family from the states of Colorado and New Mexico.

== Description ==
Griffin's penstemon is a perennial plant that is relatively long–lived for a penstemon. They are herbaceous with stems that are somewhat woody at their base. The stems grow straight upwards reaching 12 to 50 centimeters and have retrorse hairs, ones that point backwards, near the base and glandular hairs further up. They are never covered in natural waxes.

The leaves are both basal and cauline, growing from the base or from the stems. They are not leathery, but can be either hairless or have hairs along the midvein. The basal leaves and ones lower on the stems measure 13–55 millimeters by 4–12 mm with a tapering base and spatulate, oblanceolate, or elliptic shape. The stems usually have two to five pairs of leaves attached on opposite sides, but occasionally possess as many as six pairs. The upper leaves are narrow and grass-like, measuring 5–52 mm long by 0.3–5 mm wide.

The slender inflorescence has all its blue to purple flowers pointing in one direction. They are in one to five groups along the stems that usually have just one branched point of attachment, but can have two in each group. There will be one to three flowers for each attachment point. The flowers themselves are quite narrow have a white palate and a small opening. They measure 17-25 mm and are covered in glandular hairs on their outsides while having dense golden hairs on the lower surface of the floral tube. The bottom of the floral tube also has two noticeable ridges. The staminode with its dense covering of golden hairs, does not extend out of the floral tube and measures 7 to 11 mm long. Flowering can start as early as June and may occur as late as August.

The fruit is a hairless capsule that measures 6–9 mm tall by 4–5 mm wide.

== Taxonomy ==
Penstemon griffinii was scientifically described and named by the botanist Aven Nelson in 1913. It is a member of the Penstemon genus which is classified within the Plantaginaceae family. It has no subspecies or synonyms. A study of the DNA of penstemons in 2006 found that Penstemon griffinii is part of a small group of closely related plants including Penstemon confertus, Penstemon humilis, Penstemon inflatus, and Penstemon scapoides.

=== Names ===
Penstemon griffinii was given its scientific name to honor Alfred A. Griffin, a Colorado plant collector and botanist. It is known by the common names Griffin's penstemon or Griffin's beardtongue.

== Range and habitat ==
Griffin's penstemon is native to the US states of Colorado and New Mexico. According to the Flora of North America it has a larger range in Colorado where it grows in seven south-central counties extending from Park and Chaffee counties in the north southward to the state line. Its Coloradan range is largely in South Park and the San Luis Valley. Across the border in New Mexico they report that it only is found in Rio Arriba and Taos counties in the north. However, the USDA Natural Resources Conservation Service plants database additionally records it in Santa Fe County. In its range it is found at elevations between 2,500 and 3,000 meters (8,200 and 9,800 ft).

The habitat for this species is in mountain grasslands, open conifer forests, and on rocky slopes.

=== Conservation ===
The conservation organization NatureServe evaluated Penstemon griffinii in 1993 and rated it as vulnerable (G3). They also rated it as vulnerable (S3) in Colorado, but did not rate the species in New Mexico. It is a common species within its range, but is limited in area.

== Uses ==
It is somewhat rare plant in gardens with cultivation beginning around 2003. It has easy to germinate seeds.

== See also ==
- List of Penstemon species
