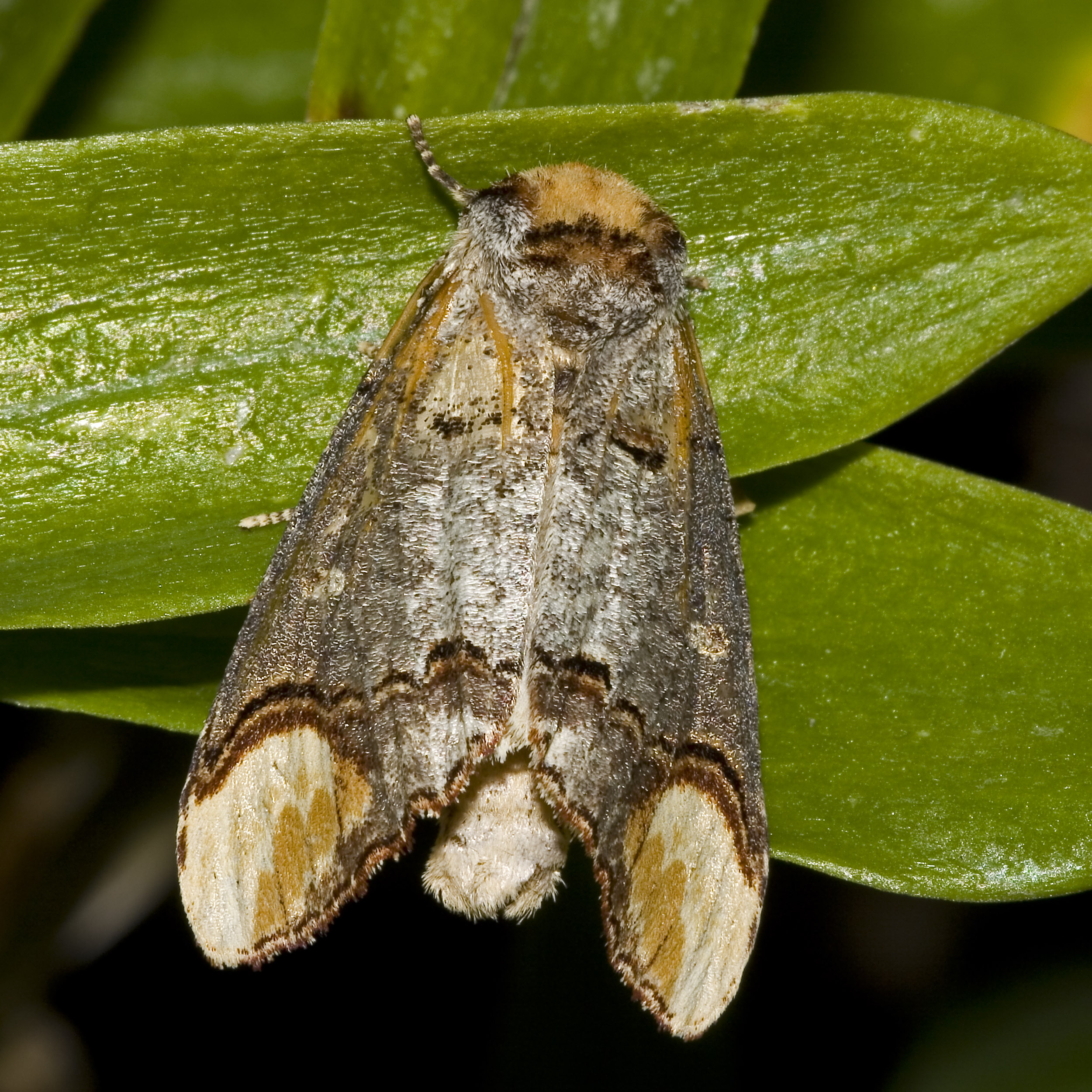

Scientific classification
- Kingdom: Animalia
- Phylum: Arthropoda
- Class: Insecta
- Order: Lepidoptera
- Superfamily: Noctuoidea
- Family: Notodontidae
- Genus: Phalera
- Species: P. bucephala

Binomial name
- Phalera bucephala (Linnaeus, 1758)

= Buff-tip =

Species of moth

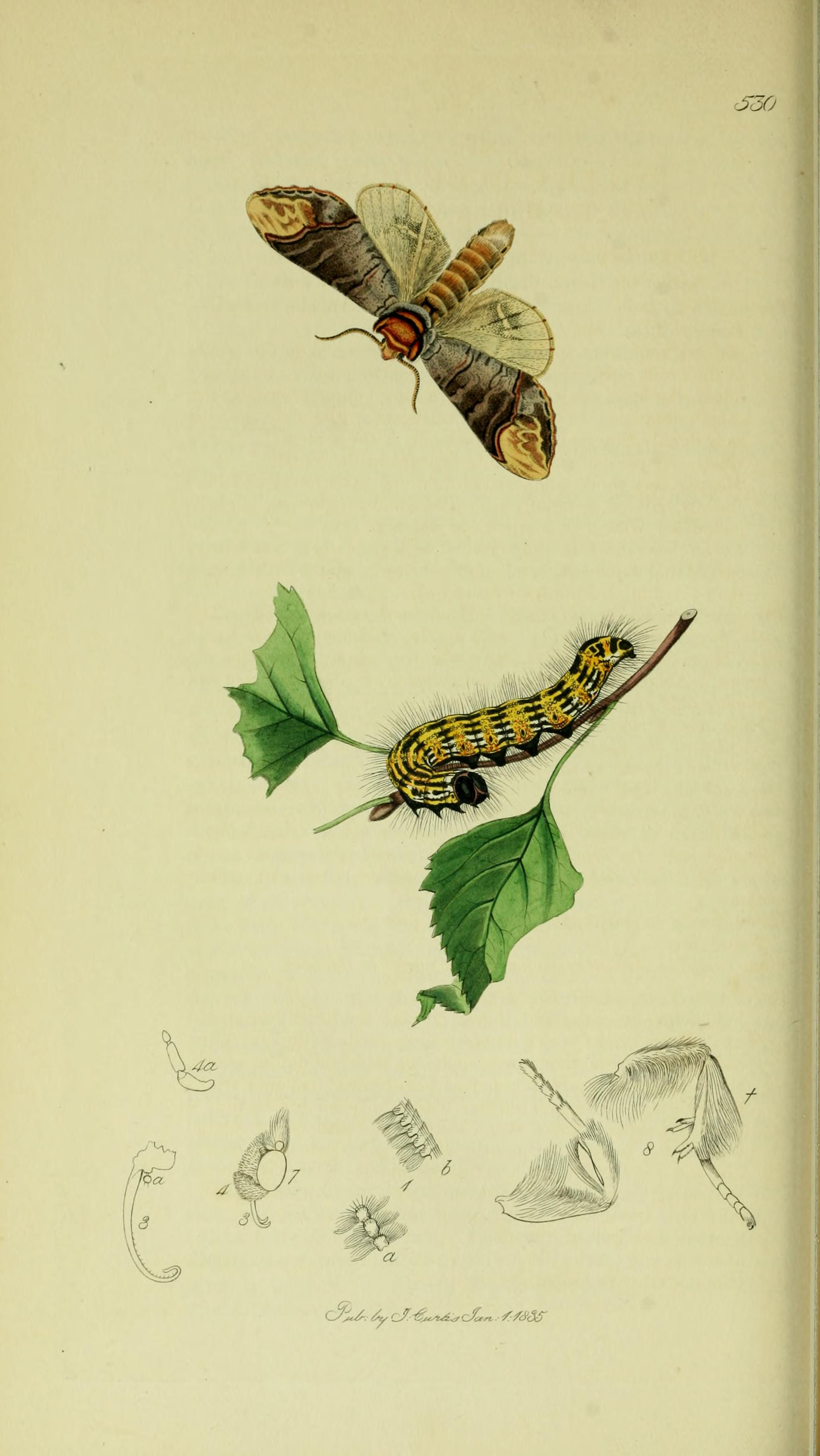
Illustration from John Curtis's British Entomology Volume 5

The buff-tip (Phalera bucephala) is a moth of the family Notodontidae. It is found throughout Europe and in Asia to eastern Siberia. The species was first described by Carl Linnaeus in his 1758 10th edition of Systema Naturae.

== Description ==
The moth is a fairly large, heavy-bodied species with a wingspan of 55–68 mm (2.2–2.7 in). The forewings are grey with a large prominent buff patch at the apex. As the thoracic hair is also buff, the moth resembles a broken twig when at rest. The hindwings are creamy white. Seitz - Head, collar and centre of thorax brownish yellow, patagia greyish white with a black-brown double basal edge, on the transverse crest 2 black-brown transverse lines, hind margin greyish white. Abdomen yellowish grey to yellowish brown. Forewing greyish brown, broadly white at the base and along the hind margin, with prediscal dark brown and black double band; at the apex a large oval yellow patch reaching down to vein 4, proximally bordered by a dark red-brown semicircle, and traversed below the apex by a broad dentate dull ochreous submarginal spot; the black postdiscal band semicircular in the costal half, parallel with the dark border of the apical patch, and then dentate, accompanied on the outer side by a dark brown line; discal spot whitish; the scaling with a strong silky gloss, excepting the apical patch. Hindwing whitish grey, with a very slight indication of a dark median band. On the underside both wings have a prominent black-brown discal band, forewing moreover with a black-browia marginal line. Throughout Europe with the exception of the Arctic Region and Greece; also in North-East Africa, Asia Minor, Siberia to East Asia. In Central Europe abundant everywhere in May and June, a second brood in July and August appears regularly only in the South. — In Norway and Southern Sweden, also in England occurs a dark form, tenebrata Strand, [subspecies P. b. tenebrata Strand, 1903] in which the white colouring of the forewing is more or less strongly reduced, particularly in the median area, while the hindwing is paler or darker grey. In ab. demaculata Strand (47 d) [aberration] the pale discal spot of the forewing moreover is absent. — bucephalina Stgr.,[ now species Phalera bucephalina (Staudinger & Rebel, 1901)] which represents the species in Western Morocco, is also characterised by a darker colouring of the ground. In addition, the discal spot is more prominent and the apical patch larger, in which characters this form approaches the next species, bucephaloides. — In the East-Asiatic infulgens Graes. (47 d)[now subspecies P. b. infulgens Graeser, 1888], which is common in the Amur and Ussuri districts, the whole forewing is uniformly whitish grey without gloss, the anterior half being hardly darker than the hind margin; the hindwing is somewhat narrower. — Egg strongly, convex green with darker top and paler base. Larva orange yellow, with glossy black head and yellowish grey hair, as well as black longitudinal stripes interrupted bet- ween the segments, 5 stripes dorsally and 2 laterally, between the latter pair the black spiracles are placed.Underside black with broad yellow median stripe, abdominal legs black outside and yellow inside. June to October, on Salix, Poplar, Birch, Lime and Oak. Pupa glossy black-brown, sometimes hibernating twice.

The moth flies at night in June and July (Note: The flight season refers to the British Isles. This may vary in other parts of the range.) and sometimes comes to light, although it is not generally strongly attracted.

The young larvae are gregarious, becoming solitary later. The older larva is very striking, black with white and yellow lines. It feeds on many trees and shrubs (see list below). The species overwinters as a pupa.

== Natural history ==
Historically, the buff-tip moth has been referred to as a pest due to their tendency to feast upon apple trees in Lithuania during the 1900s. Outbreaks of this species may increase in areas with high levels of environmental nitrogen compounds.

== Recorded food plants ==
For details see Robinson et al., 2010.

- Acer – Norway maple
- Betula – birch
- Castanea - chestnut
- Corylus – hazel
- Ribes - currant
- Laburnum
- Populus – poplar
- Prunus
- Quercus – oak
- Robinia
- Rosa – rose
- Salix – willow
- Tilia – lime
- Ulmus – elm
- Viburnum

== Subspecies ==
- P. b. bucephala
- P. b. tenebrata

== Gallery ==
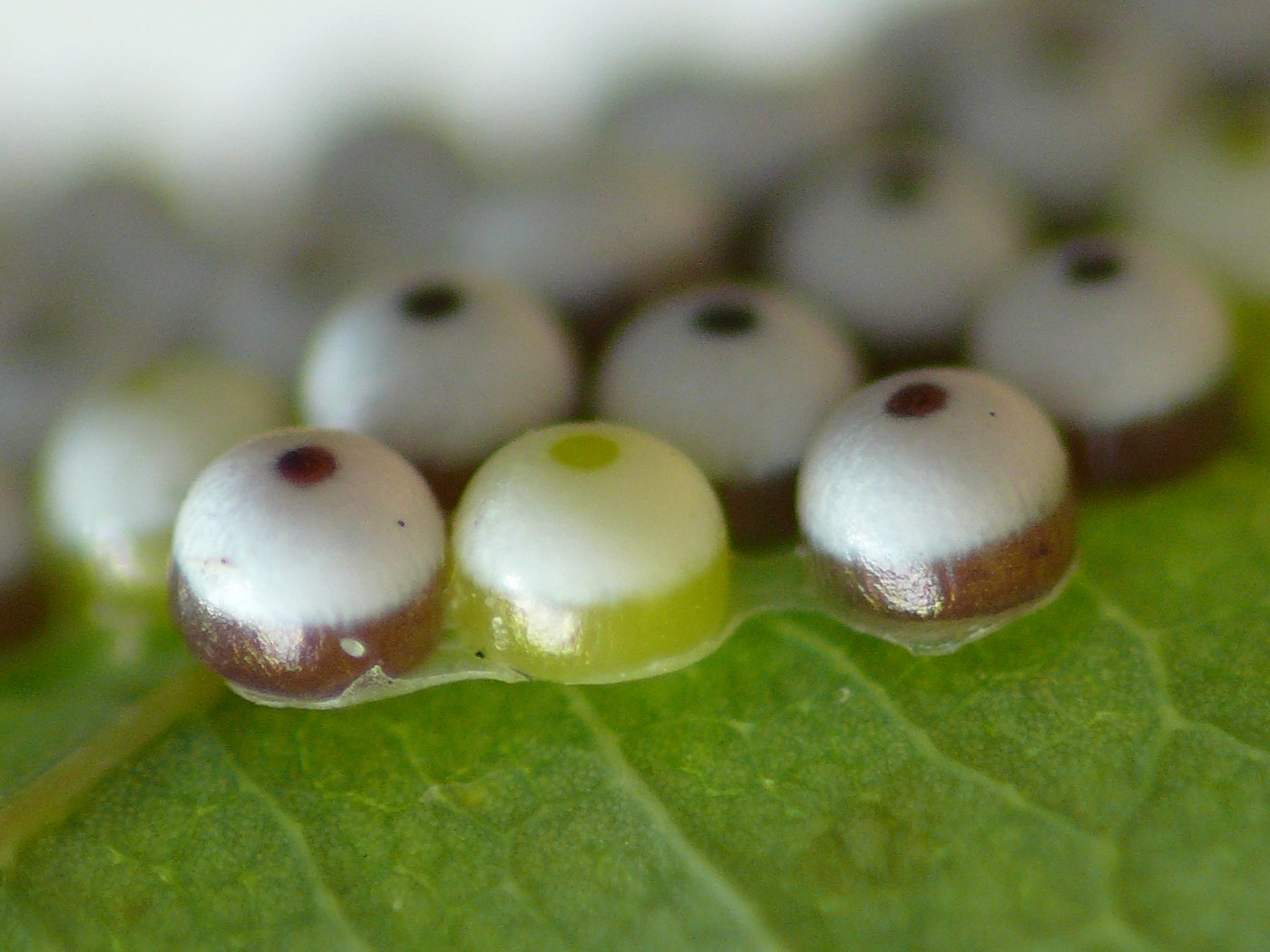
Eggs

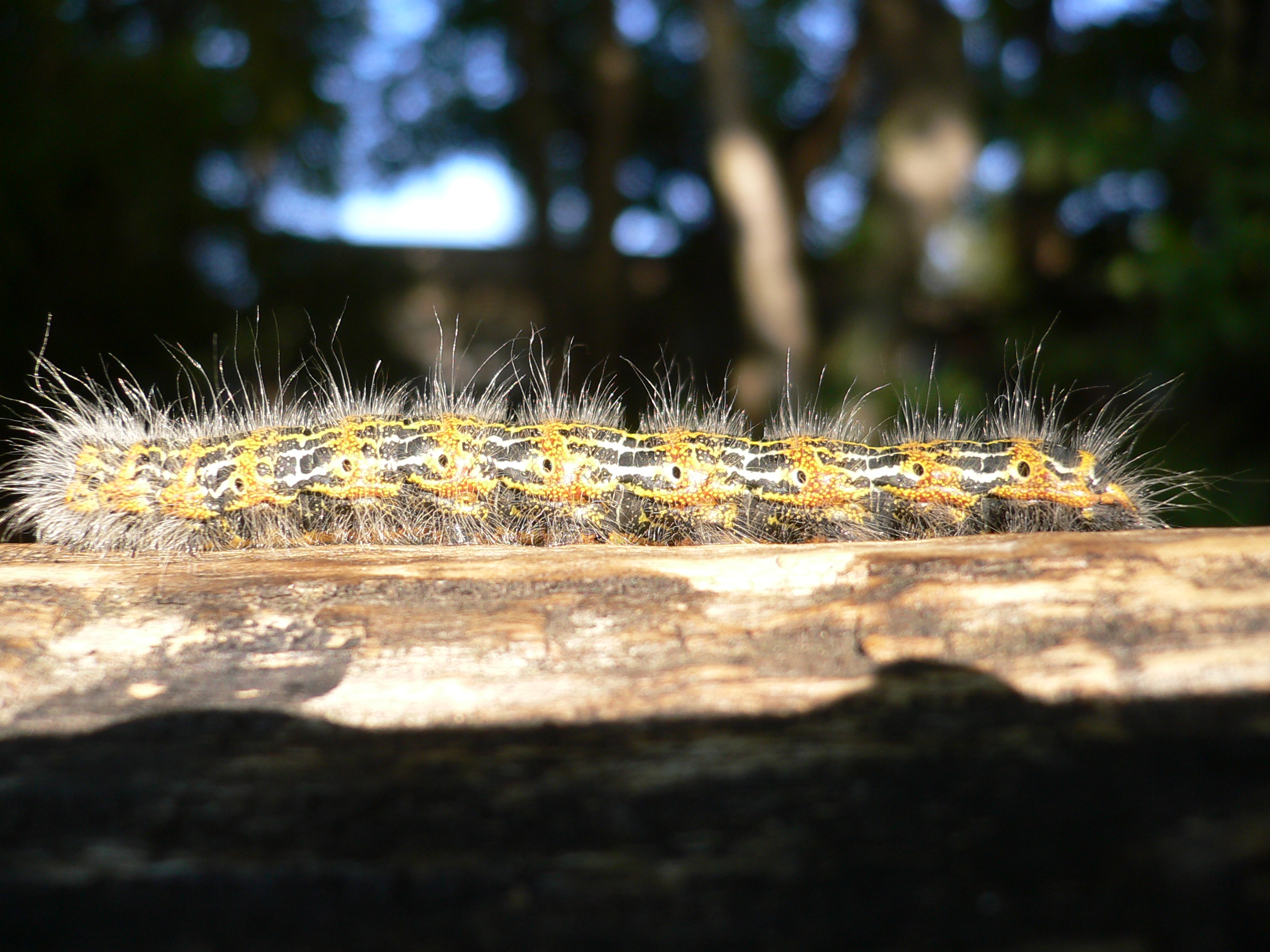
Caterpillar

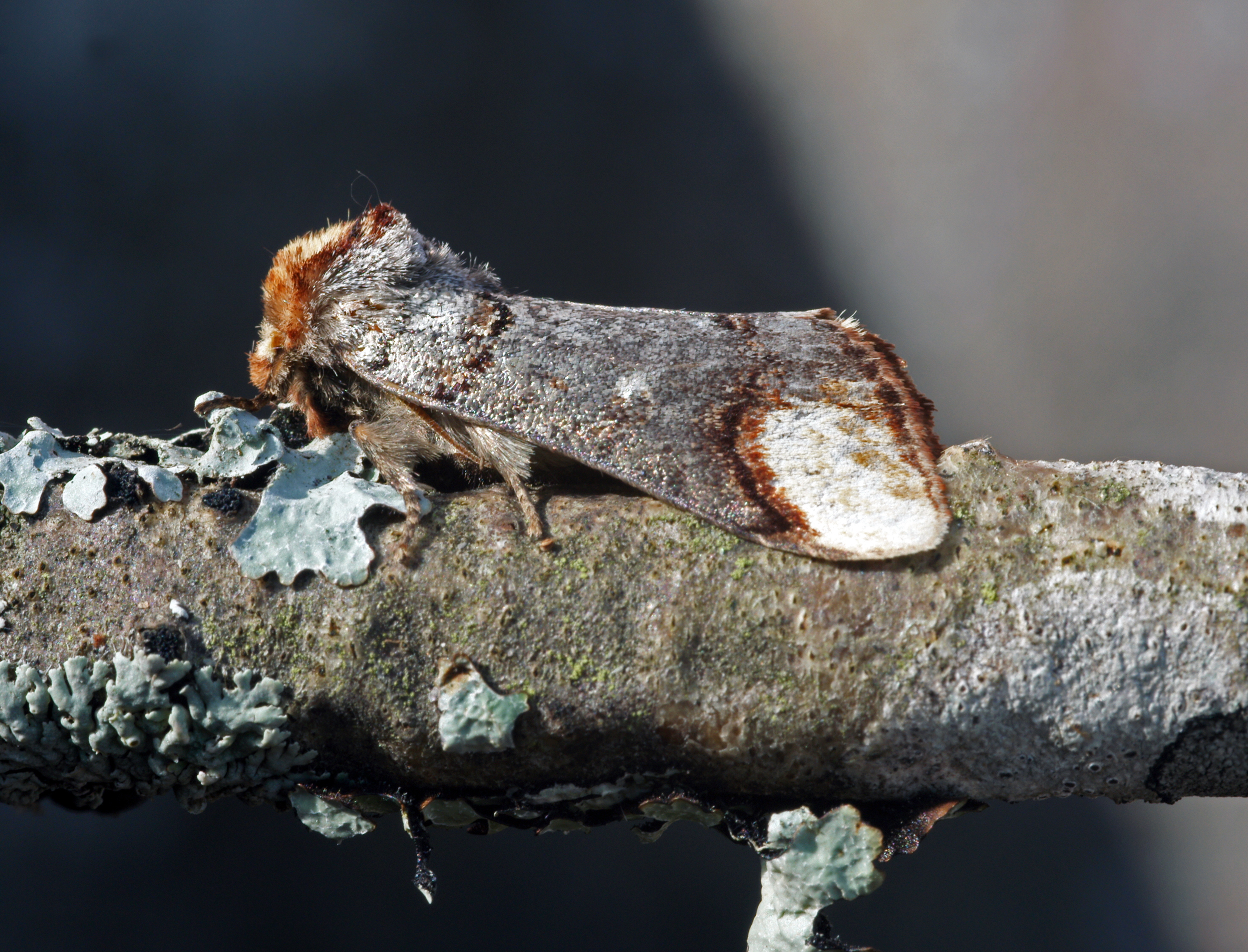
Adult in profile

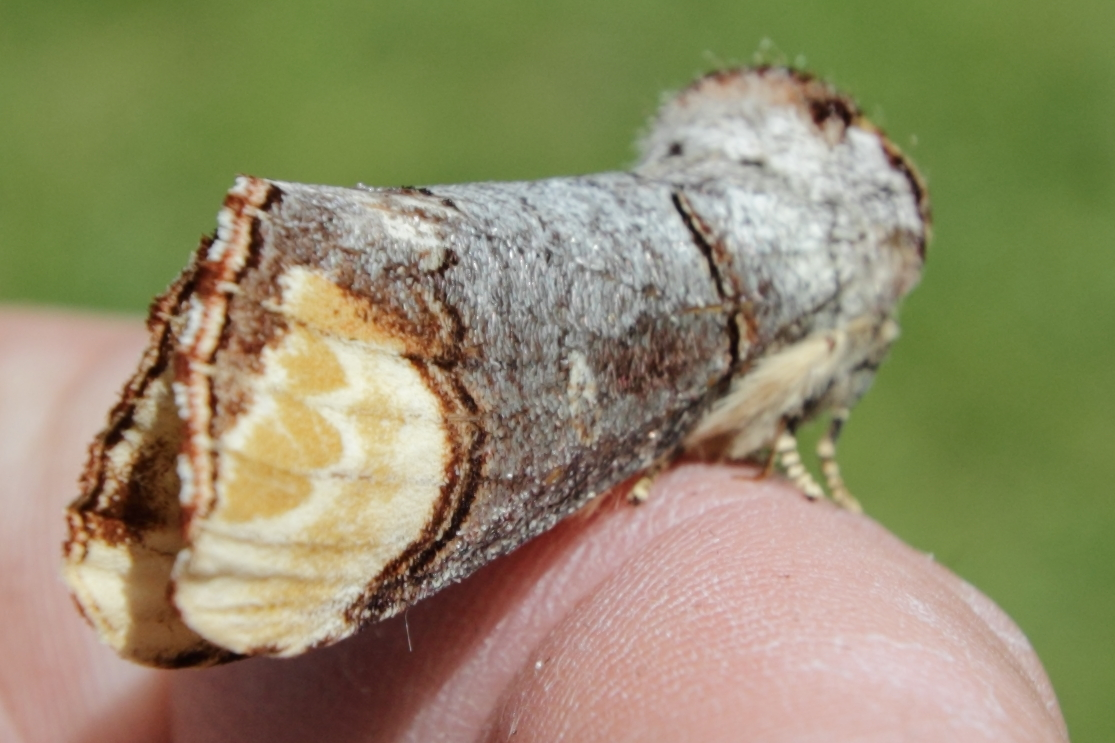
Adult back

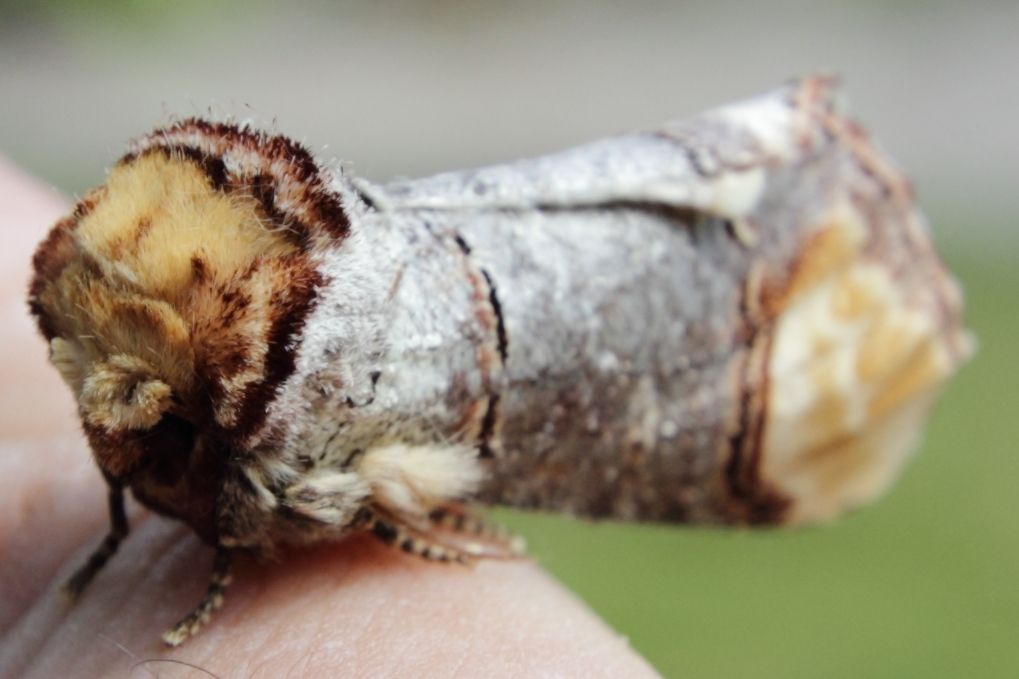
Adult front

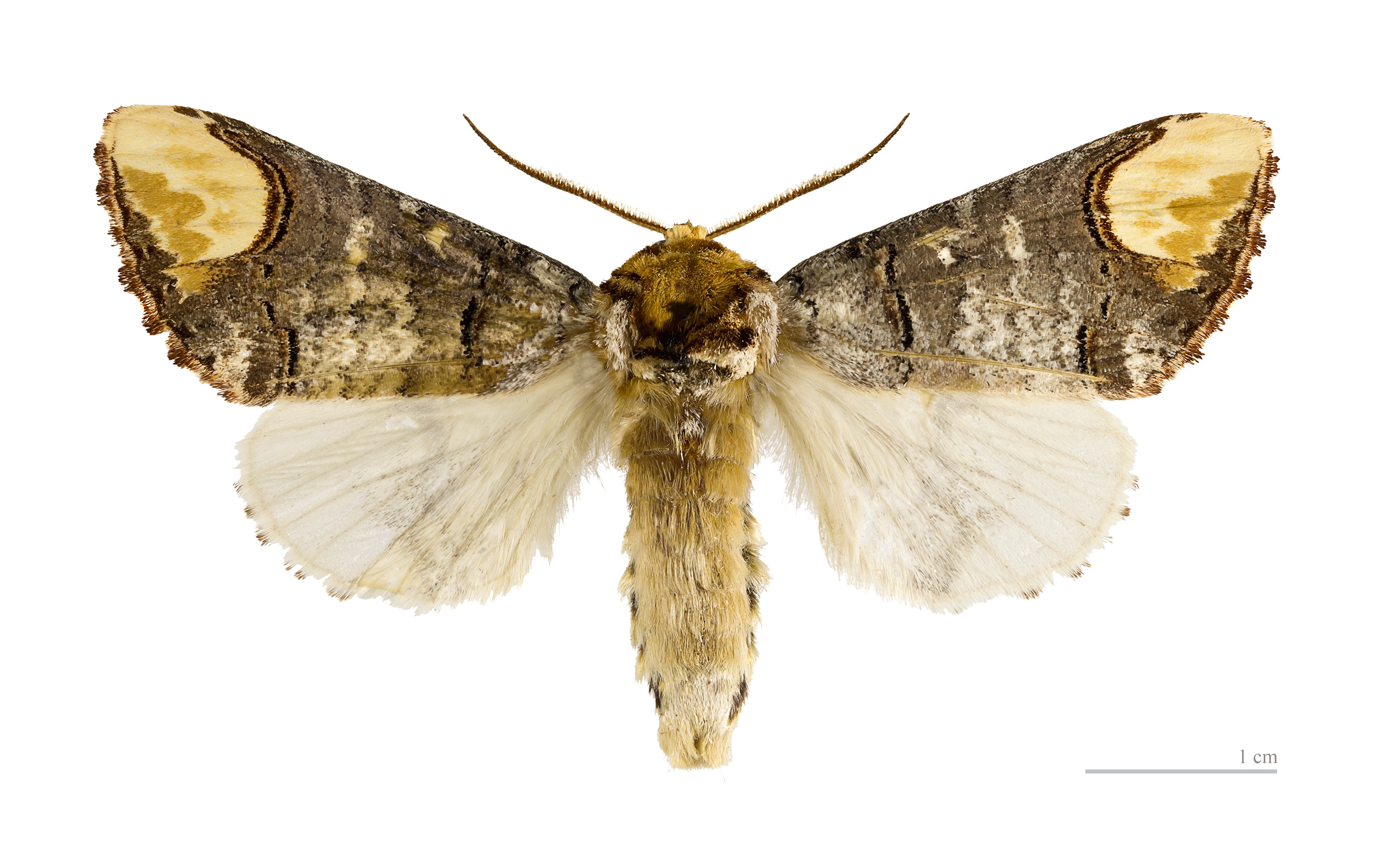
Male

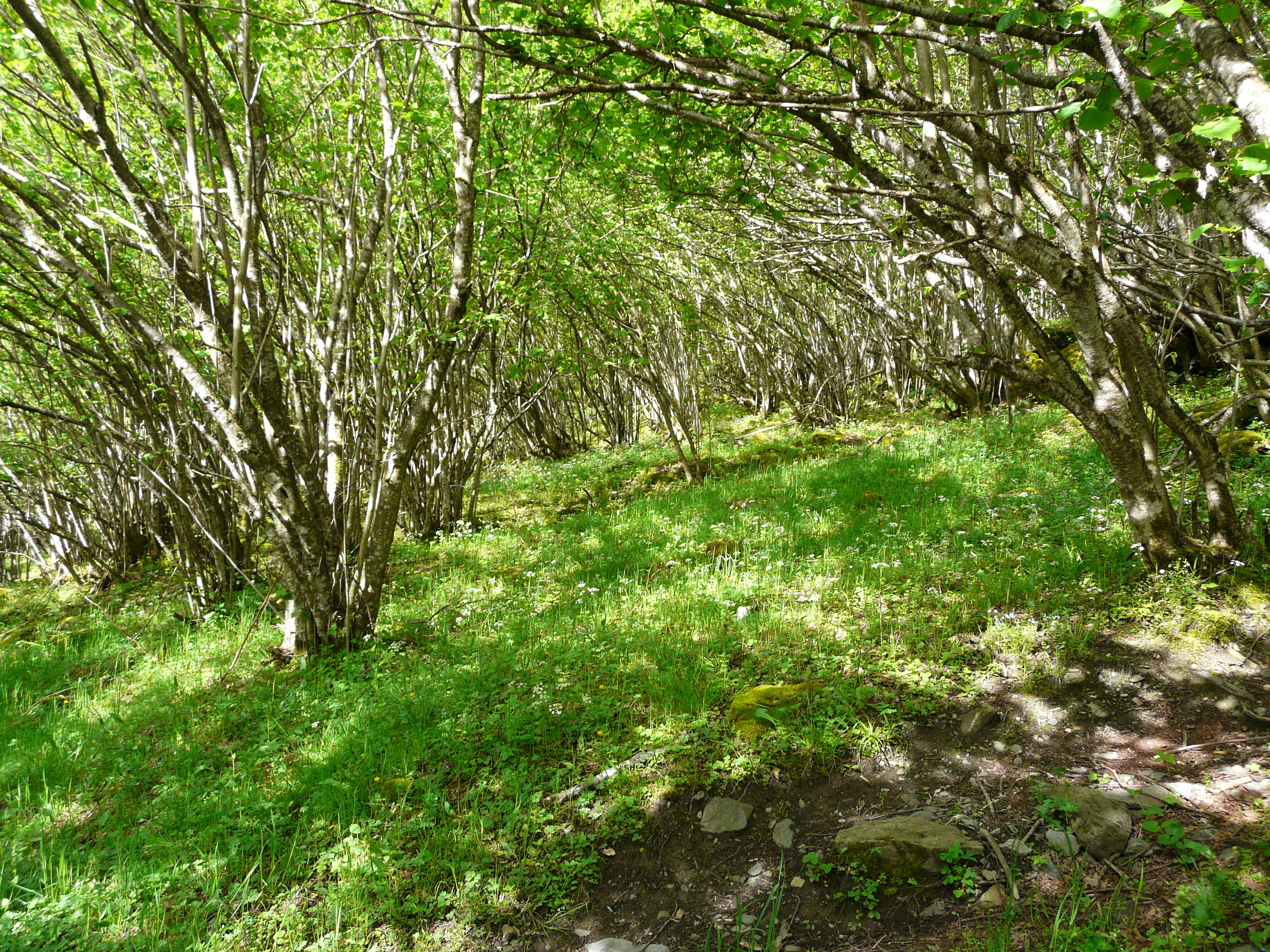
Habitat
