= Phalera =

Phalera may refer to:

- Phalera (moth), a genus of moths
- Phalera (harness), a piece of horse harness, frequently decorated in antiquity
- Phalera (military decoration), a sculpted disk of precious metal worn on the breastplate as a form of medal by soldiers of the Roman Empire

== See also ==
- Mirror armour - similar oriental armour
