= Poecilopeplus martialis =

Scientific classification
- Domain: Eukaryota
- Kingdom: Animalia
- Phylum: Arthropoda
- Class: Insecta
- Order: Coleoptera
- Suborder: Polyphaga
- Infraorder: Cucujiformia
- Family: Cerambycidae
- Genus: Poecilopeplus
- Species: P. martialis

Binomial name
- Poecilopeplus martialis Rosenberg, 1898

Species of beetle

Poecilopeplus martialis is a species of beetle in the family Cerambycidae. It was described by Rosenberg in 1898.
