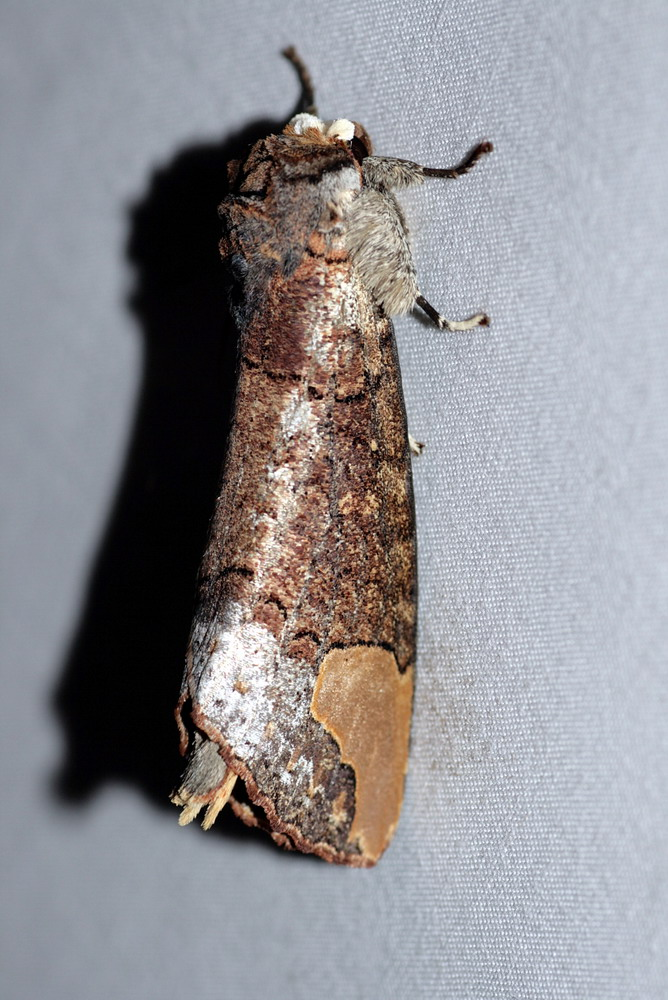

Scientific classification
- Kingdom: Animalia
- Phylum: Arthropoda
- Clade: Pancrustacea
- Class: Insecta
- Order: Lepidoptera
- Superfamily: Noctuoidea
- Family: Notodontidae
- Genus: Phalera
- Species: P. sundana

Binomial name
- Phalera sundana Holloway, 1982

= Phalera sundana =

Species of moth

Phalera sundana is a moth of the family Notodontidae. It is found in Sundaland, including Bali and Mindanao.

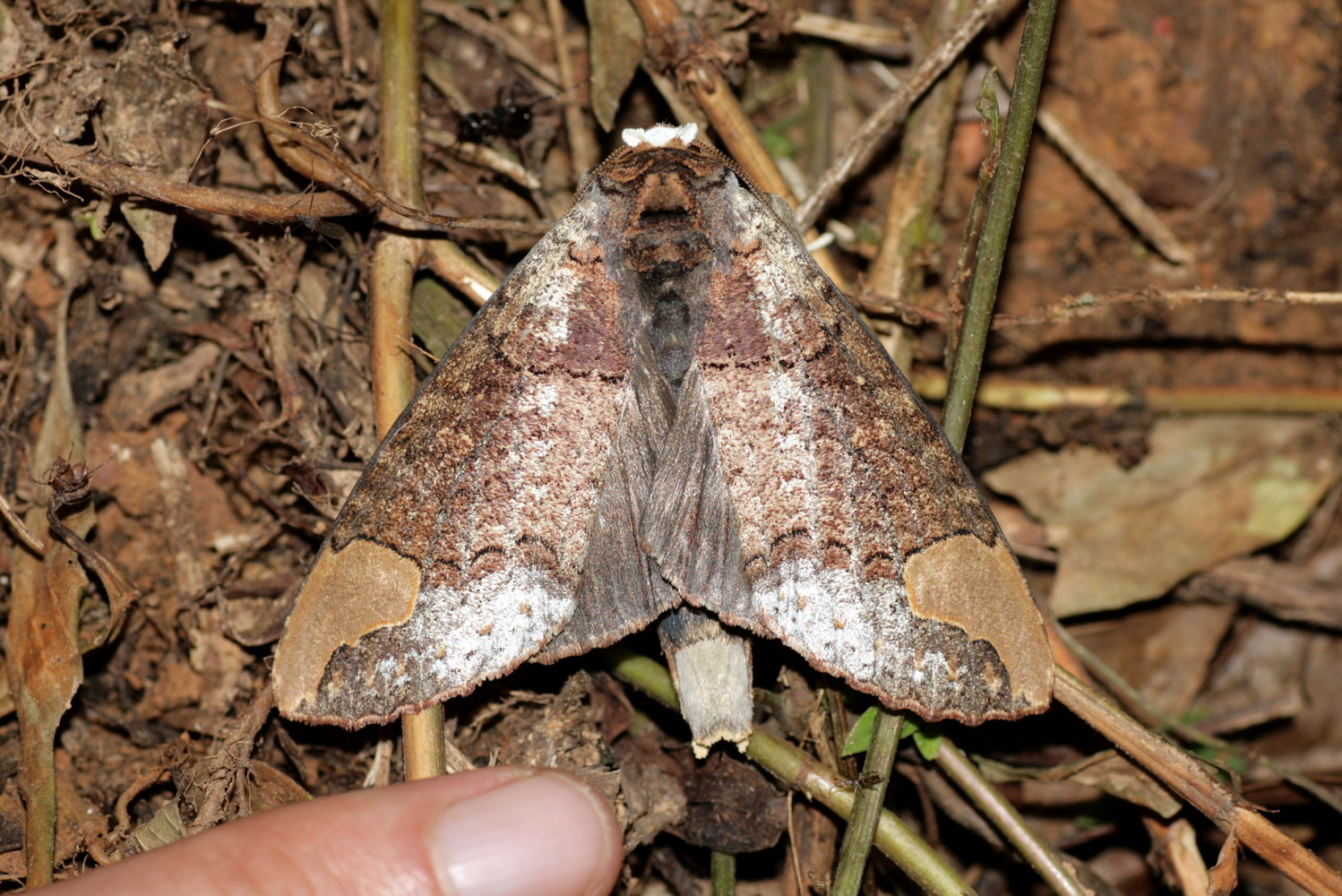

The wingspan is 45–54 for males and 55–59 mm for females.
