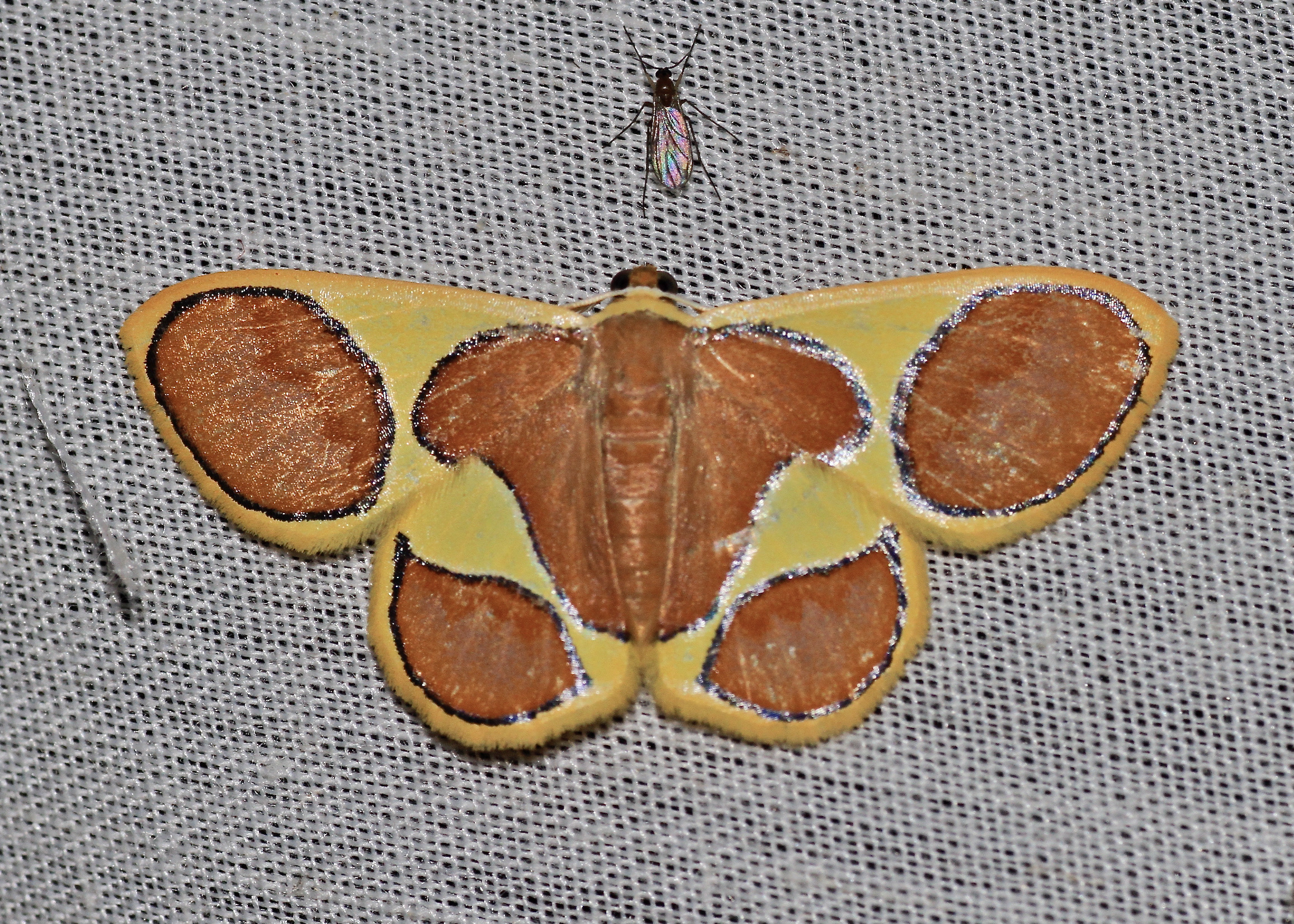
- Plutodes cyclaria from Borneo.

Scientific classification
- Kingdom: Animalia
- Phylum: Arthropoda
- Class: Insecta
- Order: Lepidoptera
- Family: Geometridae
- Genus: Plutodes
- Species: P. cyclaria

Binomial name
- Plutodes cyclaria Guenée, 1857

= Plutodes cyclaria =

Species of moth

Plutodes cyclaria is a species of moth of the family Geometridae first described by Achille Guenée in 1857. It is found in the north-eastern Borneo, Sumatra, Peninsular Malaysia.
