= Poecilopeplus intricatus =

Scientific classification
- Kingdom: Animalia
- Phylum: Arthropoda
- Class: Insecta
- Order: Coleoptera
- Suborder: Polyphaga
- Infraorder: Cucujiformia
- Family: Cerambycidae
- Genus: Poecilopeplus
- Species: P. intricatus

Binomial name
- Poecilopeplus intricatus (Blanchard, 1847)

Species of beetle

Poecilopeplus intricatus is a species of beetle in the family Cerambycidae. It was described by Blanchard in 1847.
