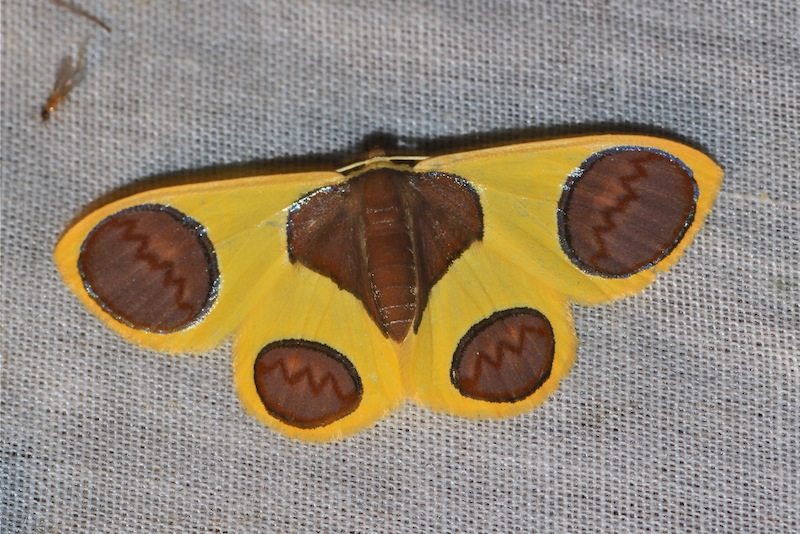
- Plutodes flavescens in Borneo

Scientific classification
- Kingdom: Animalia
- Phylum: Arthropoda
- Class: Insecta
- Order: Lepidoptera
- Family: Geometridae
- Tribe: Plutodini
- Genus: Plutodes; Guenée in Boisduval & Guenée, 1857

= Plutodes =

Genus of moths

Plutodes is a genus of moths in the family Geometridae erected by Achille Guenée in 1857.

== Description ==
It is similar to species of genus Lomographa. Differs from hairy palpi. Antennae uniseriate in both sexes to two-thirds of length.

== Species ==
- Plutodes argentilauta Prout, 1929 Buru, Sulawesi, Borneo, Sumatra
- Plutodes costatus Butler, 1886 India, Sikkim, Nepal, China
- Plutodes cyclaria Guenée, 1857 Borneo, Sumatra, Peninsular Malaysia
- Plutodes discigera Butler, 1880 northern India - south-eastern China
- Plutodes evaginata Holloway, 1993 Borneo
- Plutodes exiguifascia Hampson, 1895 Sri Lanka
- Plutodes flavescens Butler, 1880 north-eastern Himalayas, Borneo, Sumatra, Java
- Plutodes malaysiana Holloway, 1982 Peninsular Malaysia, Singapore, Borneo
- Plutodes nilgirica Hampson, 1891 southern India
- Plutodes signifera Warren, 1896 Australia
- Plutodes transmutata Walker, 1861 India, Nepal, probably in Sri Lanka
- Plutodes unidentata Holloway, 1976 Borneo, Sumatra, Java, Sulawesi
- Plutodes wandamannensis Joicey & Talbot, 1917 New Guinea
