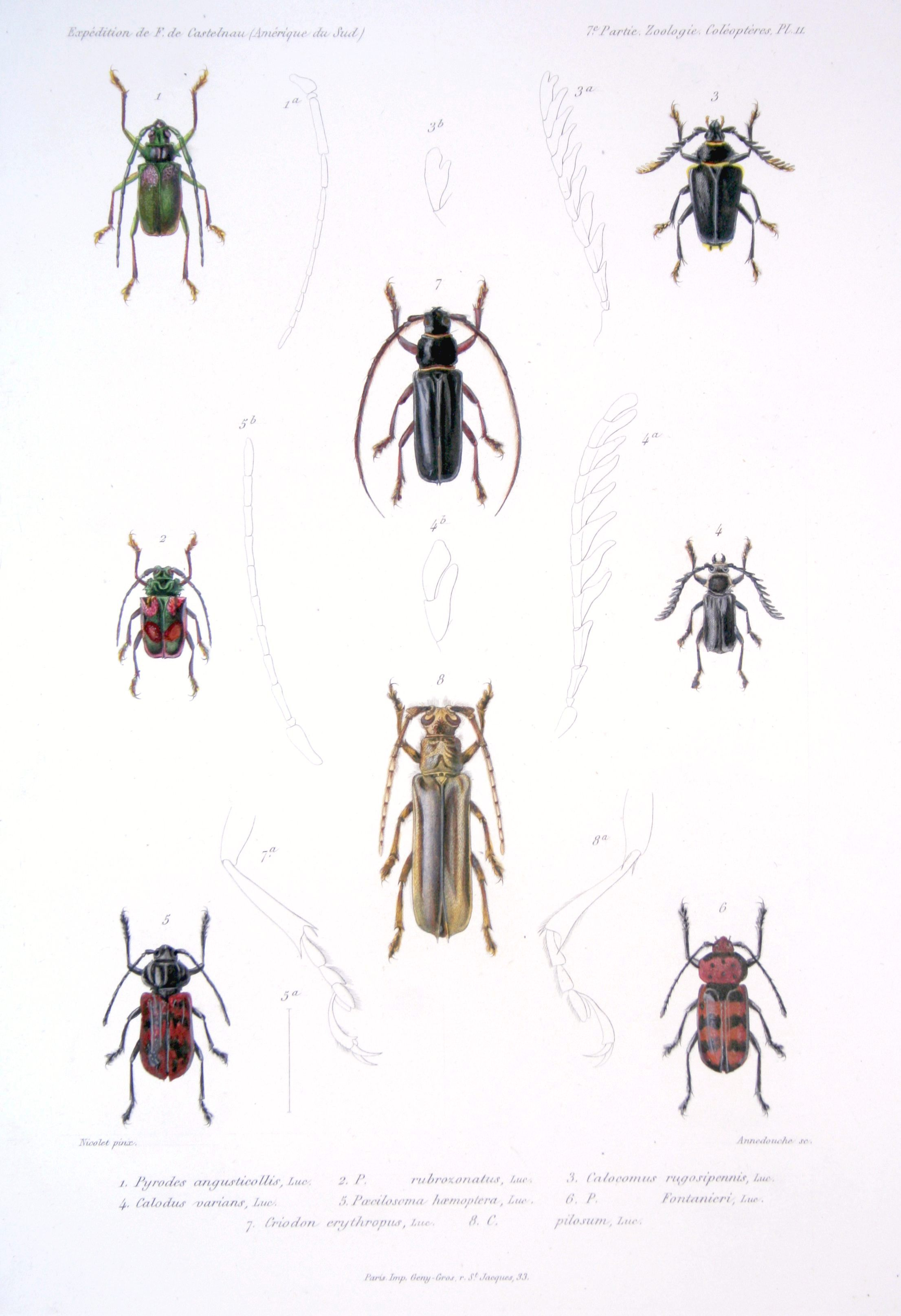
- Pœcilosoma hæmoptera Luc. = Poecilopeplus haemopterus (Lucas, 1859) (5a: length, 5b: antenna) P[œcilosoma] Fontanieri Luc. = Poecilopeplus fontanieri (Lucas, 1859)

Scientific classification
- Kingdom: Animalia
- Phylum: Arthropoda
- Class: Insecta
- Order: Coleoptera
- Suborder: Polyphaga
- Infraorder: Cucujiformia
- Family: Cerambycidae
- Subfamily: Cerambycinae
- Tribe: Trachyderini
- Genus: Poecilopeplus; Dejean, 1835

= Poecilopeplus =

Genus of beetles

Poecilopeplus is a genus of beetles in the family Cerambycidae, containing the following species:

- Poecilopeplus batesi White, 1853
- Poecilopeplus corallifer (Sturm, 1826)
- Poecilopeplus flavescens Rosenberg, 1898
- Poecilopeplus fontanieri (Lucas, 1857)
- Poecilopeplus haemopterus (Lucas, 1857)
- Poecilopeplus intricatus (Blanchard in Orbigny, 1847)
- Poecilopeplus martialis Rosenberg, 1898
- Poecilopeplus tardifi Michard, 1887
