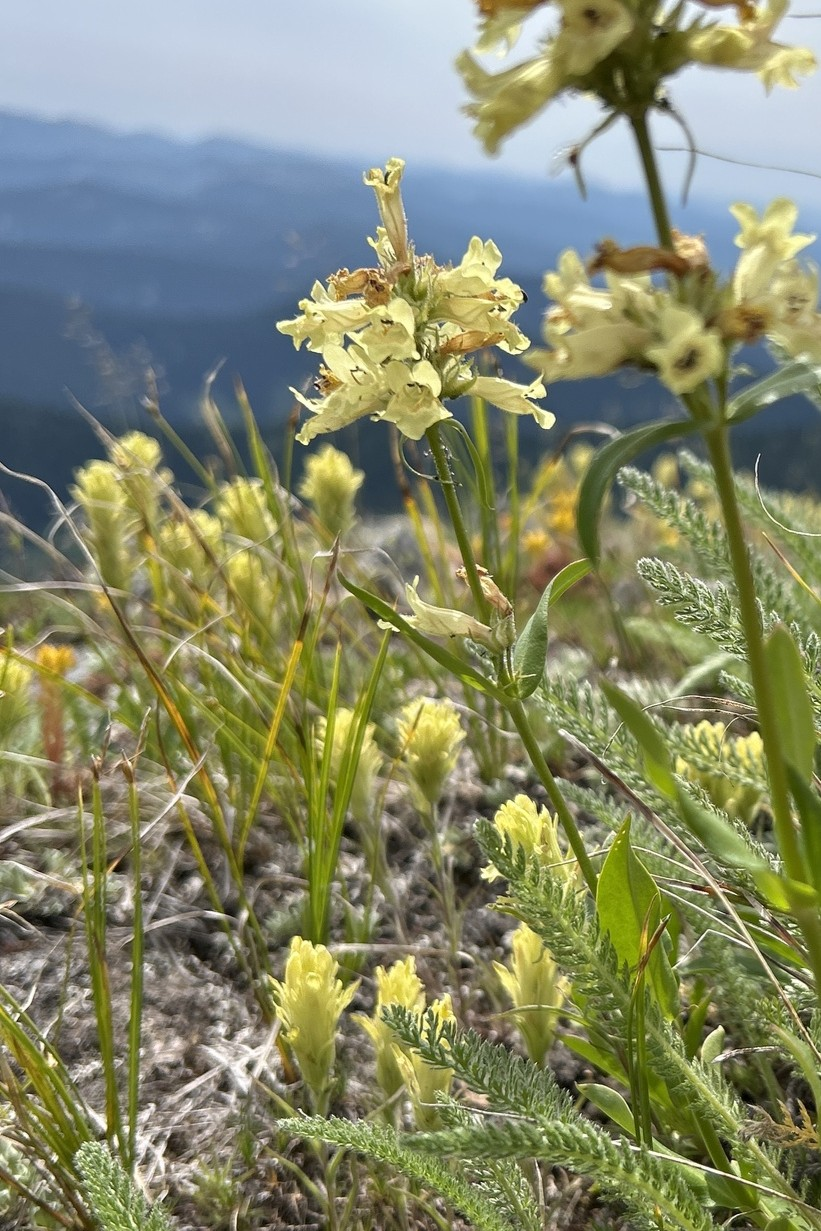
- On Illinois Peak, east of summit, Mineral County, Montana

Conservation status
- Vulnerable (NatureServe)

Scientific classification
- Kingdom: Plantae
- Clade: Embryophytes
- Clade: Tracheophytes
- Clade: Spermatophytes
- Clade: Angiosperms
- Clade: Eudicots
- Clade: Asterids
- Order: Lamiales
- Family: Plantaginaceae
- Genus: Penstemon
- Species: P. flavescens

Binomial name
- Penstemon flavescens Pennell

= Penstemon flavescens =

Plant species in the veronica family

Penstemon flavescens, the high mountain penstemon, is a species in the veronica family from the mountains of Montana and Idaho in the western United States.

== Description ==
High mountain penstemon is a herbaceous plant with flowering stems that grow straight upwards, generally to 10 to 40 centimeters (4–15.5 in) in height, but occasionally just 6 cm (2.5 in). They are never glaucous, but can be hairless or puberulent, covered in short and fine hairs that stand up strait from the stems.

These penstemons have both basal leaves and ones attached to its flowering stems that can be somewhat leathery in texture or not and always have smooth edges. The lowest leaves on the stems and the basal leaves are oblanceolate to lanceolate, but sometimes elliptic, and usually 2.5–11.5 centimeters (1–4.5 in) long, though occasionally just 1.2 cm (0.5 in) long. Their width is 0.4–2.2 cm, though usually more than 0.7 cm, with a tapering base. On the stems they have two to four pairs of leaves attached to opposite sides directly by the base of the leaves. The upper ones are 1.8 to 6.5 centimeters (0.5–2.5 in) long and 0.3–1.6 cm wide. Like the lower leaves they can be oblanceolate to lanceolate, but are sometimes ovate.

It has tubular flowers that are pale yellow, each 1.2–1.6 cm long. They are most often hairless on the outside, but can be glandular-pubescent at times. Internally they have sparse to moderate amounts of yellow hairs, and lack floral guide lines.

== Taxonomy ==
In 1942 a new species in the Penstemon genus was described by Francis Whittier Pennell which he named Penstemon flavescens. Along with its genus it is part of the Plantaginaceae family and has no subspecies or synonyms.

=== Names ===
In Botanical Latin flavescens means yellowish. Penstemon flavescens is known by the common name high mountain penstemon. It is also called tall yellow beardtongue and yellow penstemon, although other species such as Penstemon confertus are also known as yellow penstemons.

== Range and habitat ==
High mountain penstemons are native to eastern central Idaho southwestern Montana. In Idaho it grows in three contiguous counties, Shoshone, Clearwater, and Idaho counties. However, in Montana the species is known from two counties bordering Idaho, Missoula and Ravalli, and two discontiguous counties further east, Jefferson and Sweet Grass. The flowers can be found in the Bitterroot Mountains, mainly in Idaho but extending in to Montana, and grows at elevations of 1,800 to 2,500 meters (5,900–8,200 ft).

It grows in high alpine habitats in moist areas, both in open and wooded areas and on rocky slopes. Though the species has been reported in Oregon these plants may instead be a somewhat white or yellow variation of Penstemon attenuatus var. attenuatus.

== See also ==
List of Penstemon species
