= Plutodes transmutata =

Scientific classification
- Kingdom: Animalia
- Phylum: Arthropoda
- Clade: Pancrustacea
- Class: Insecta
- Order: Lepidoptera
- Family: Geometridae
- Genus: Plutodes
- Species: P. transmutata

Binomial name
- Plutodes transmutata Walker, 1861

Species of moth

Plutodes transmutata is a moth of the family Geometridae first described by Francis Walker in 1861. It is found in India, Nepal and probably in Sri Lanka.

The wingspan of the male is 27 mm. Its head is rufous, whereas the vertex and shaft of the antennae are whitish. Collar yellow. Thorax and abdomen rufous. Forewings and hindwings are typical of Plutodes with bright yellow and a small rufous patch. A similar large, rufous patch on the whole outer area. Outer patch has sinuous inner edges extending to inner margin of the forewing and costa of the hindwing.
