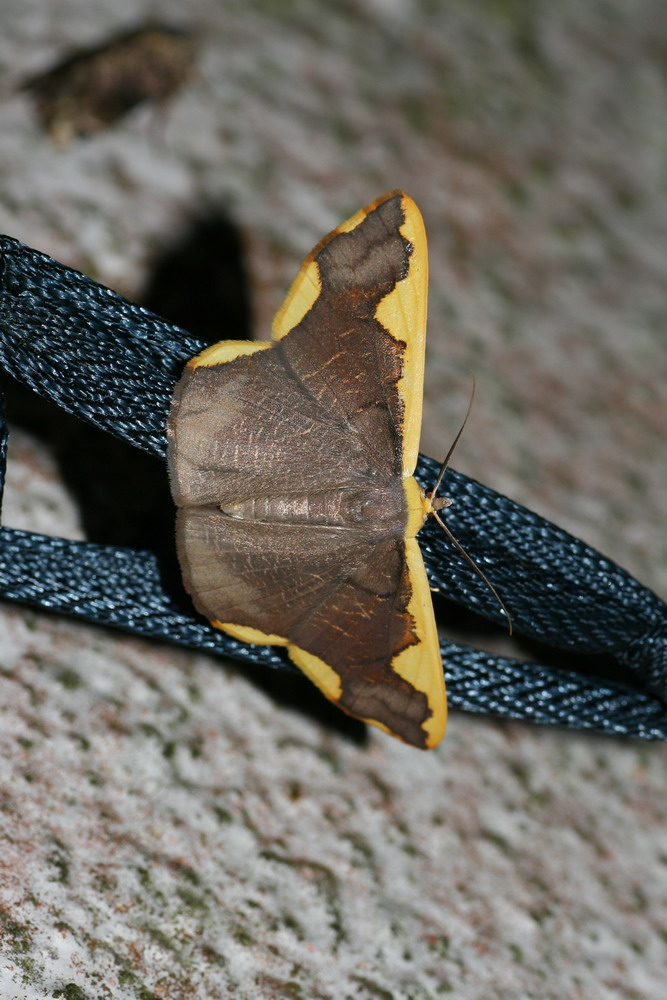
- Plutodes costatus from Fraser's Hill, Malaysia.

Scientific classification
- Domain: Eukaryota
- Kingdom: Animalia
- Phylum: Arthropoda
- Class: Insecta
- Order: Lepidoptera
- Family: Geometridae
- Genus: Plutodes
- Species: P. costatus

Binomial name
- Plutodes costatus Butler, 1886

= Plutodes costatus =

Species of moth

Plutodes costatus is a moth of the family Geometridae first described by Arthur Gardiner Butler in 1886. It is found in India, Sikkim, Nepal and China.
