= Poecilopeplus tardifi =

Scientific classification
- Domain: Eukaryota
- Kingdom: Animalia
- Phylum: Arthropoda
- Class: Insecta
- Order: Coleoptera
- Suborder: Polyphaga
- Infraorder: Cucujiformia
- Family: Cerambycidae
- Genus: Poecilopeplus
- Species: P. tardifi

Binomial name
- Poecilopeplus tardifi Michard, 1887

Species of beetle

Poecilopeplus tardifi is a species of beetle in the family of Cerambycidae. It was first described by Michard in 1887.
