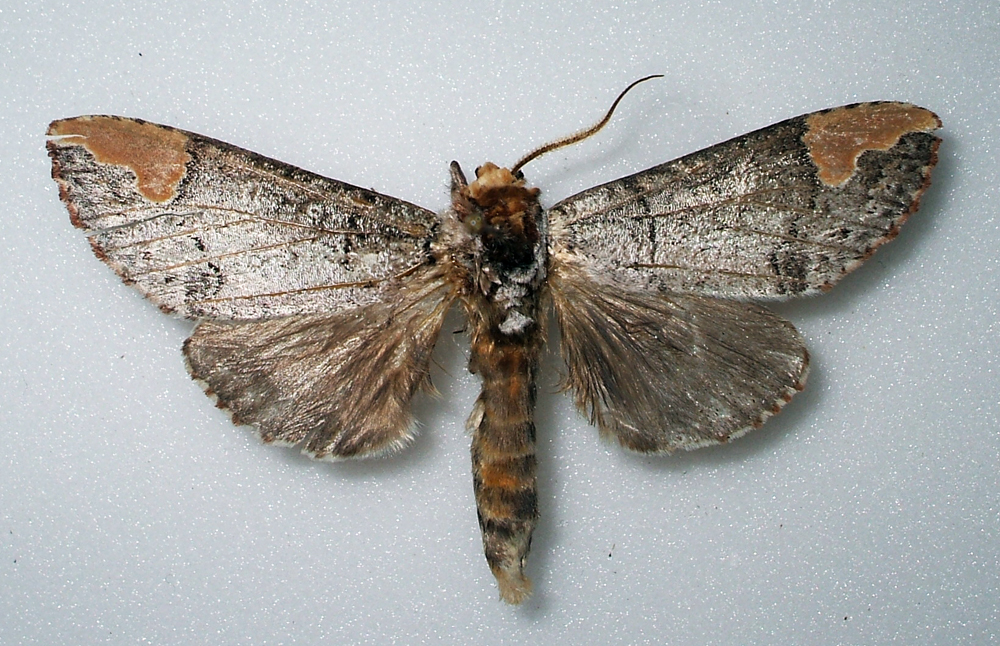

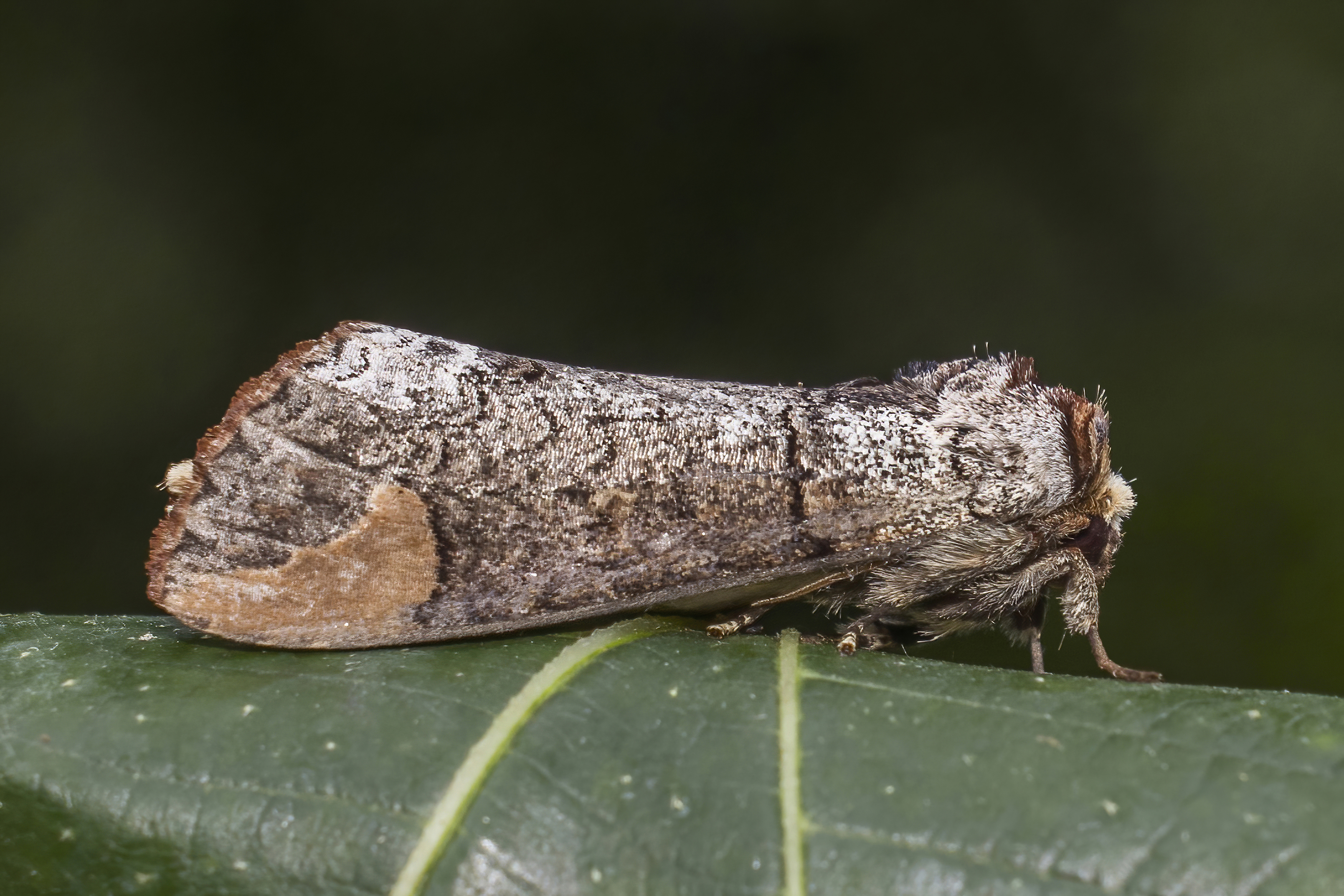

Scientific classification
- Domain: Eukaryota
- Kingdom: Animalia
- Phylum: Arthropoda
- Class: Insecta
- Order: Lepidoptera
- Superfamily: Noctuoidea
- Family: Notodontidae
- Genus: Phalera
- Species: P. grotei

Binomial name
- Phalera grotei Moore, 1859

= Phalera grotei =

Species of moth

Phalera grotei, or Grote's buff-tip, is a moth of the family Notodontidae. The species was first described by Frederic Moore in 1859. It is found in India, Sri Lanka, China, Thailand, Korea, Hong Kong, Vietnam, Indonesia to Sumatra and Borneo.

== Gallery ==
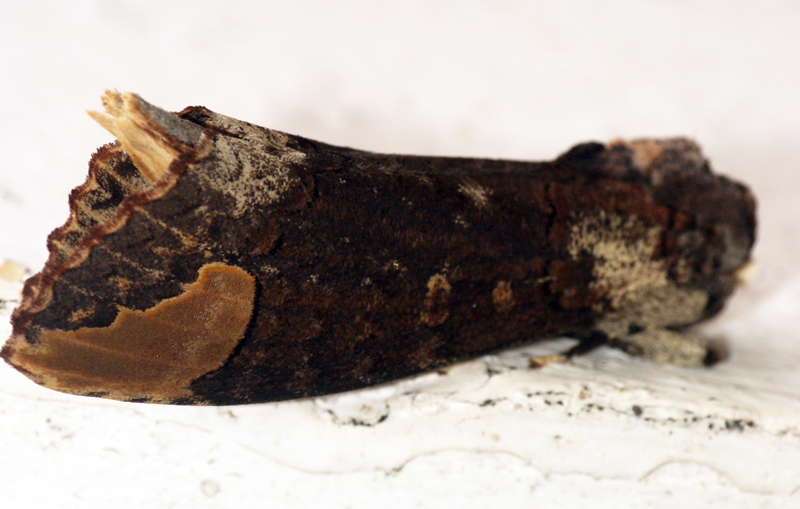
Side view

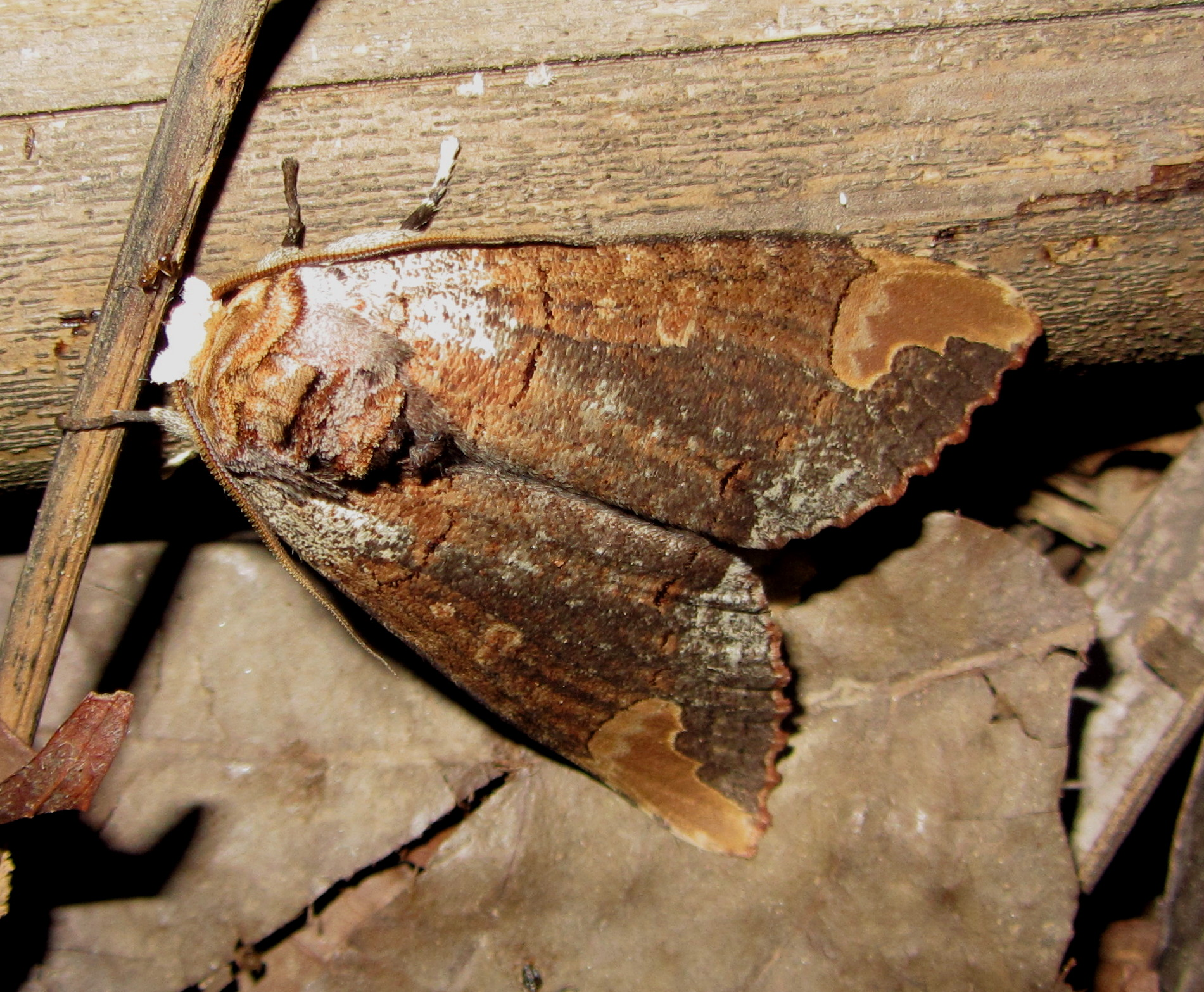
Dorsal view

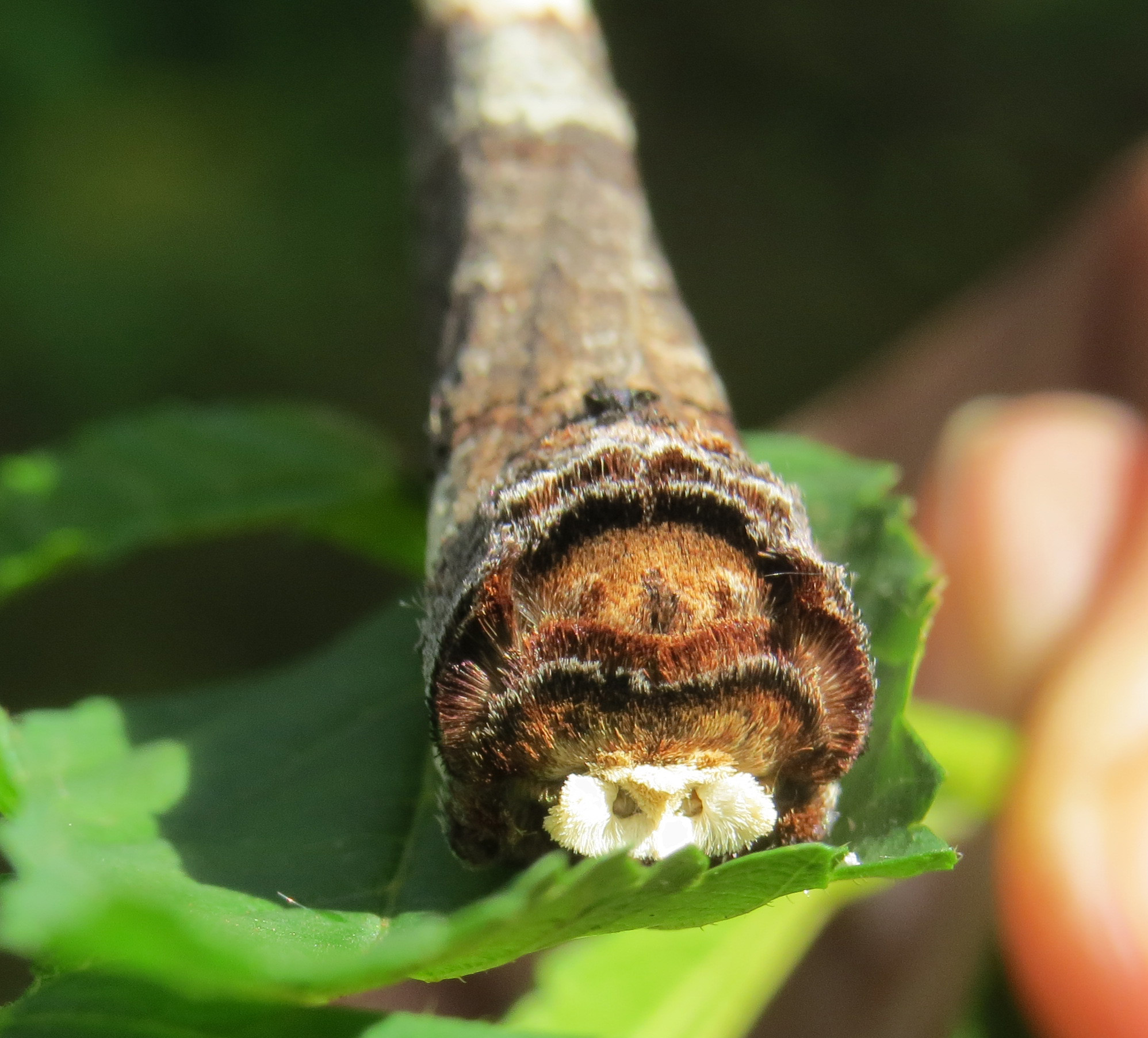
Front view

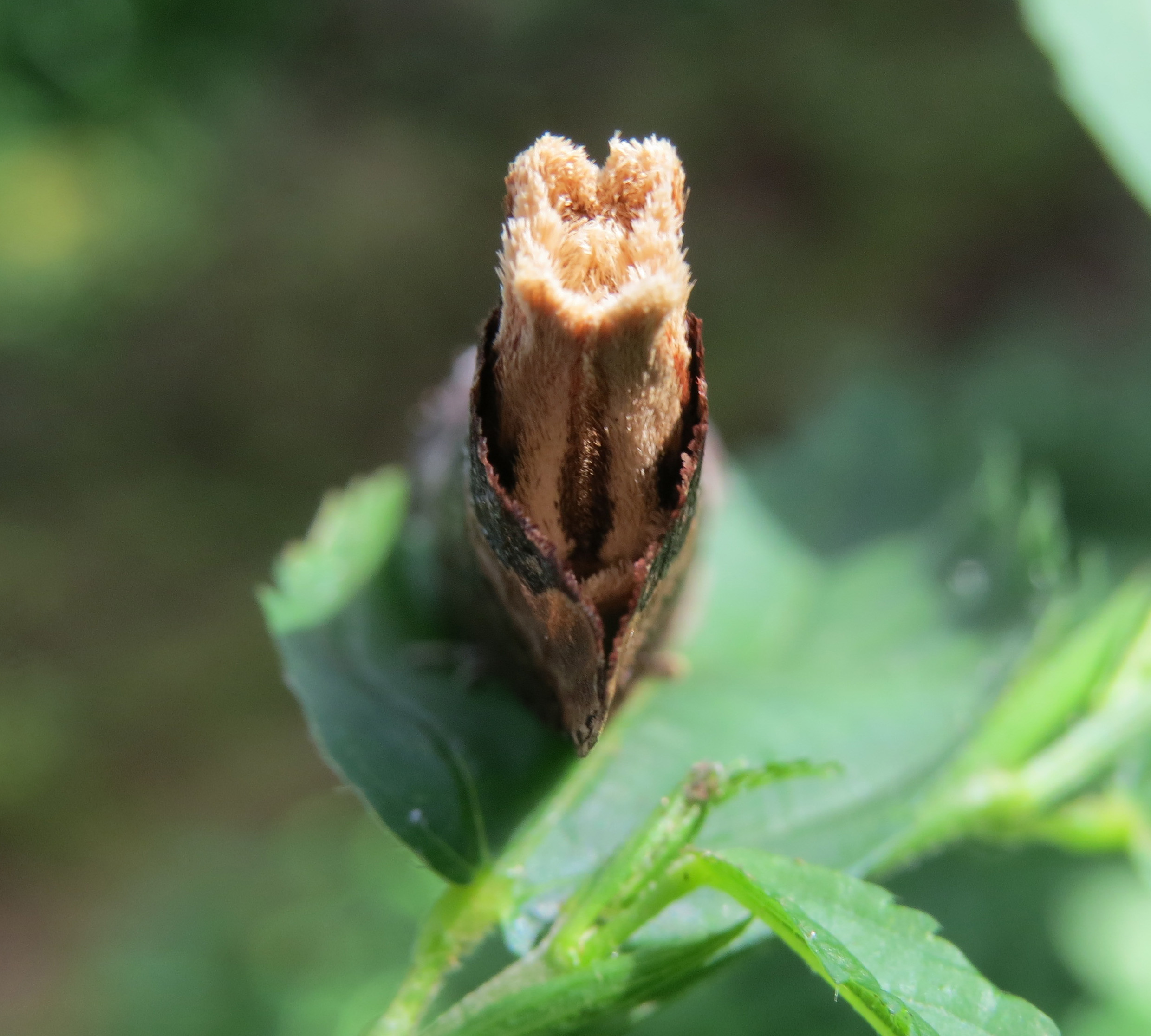
Back view

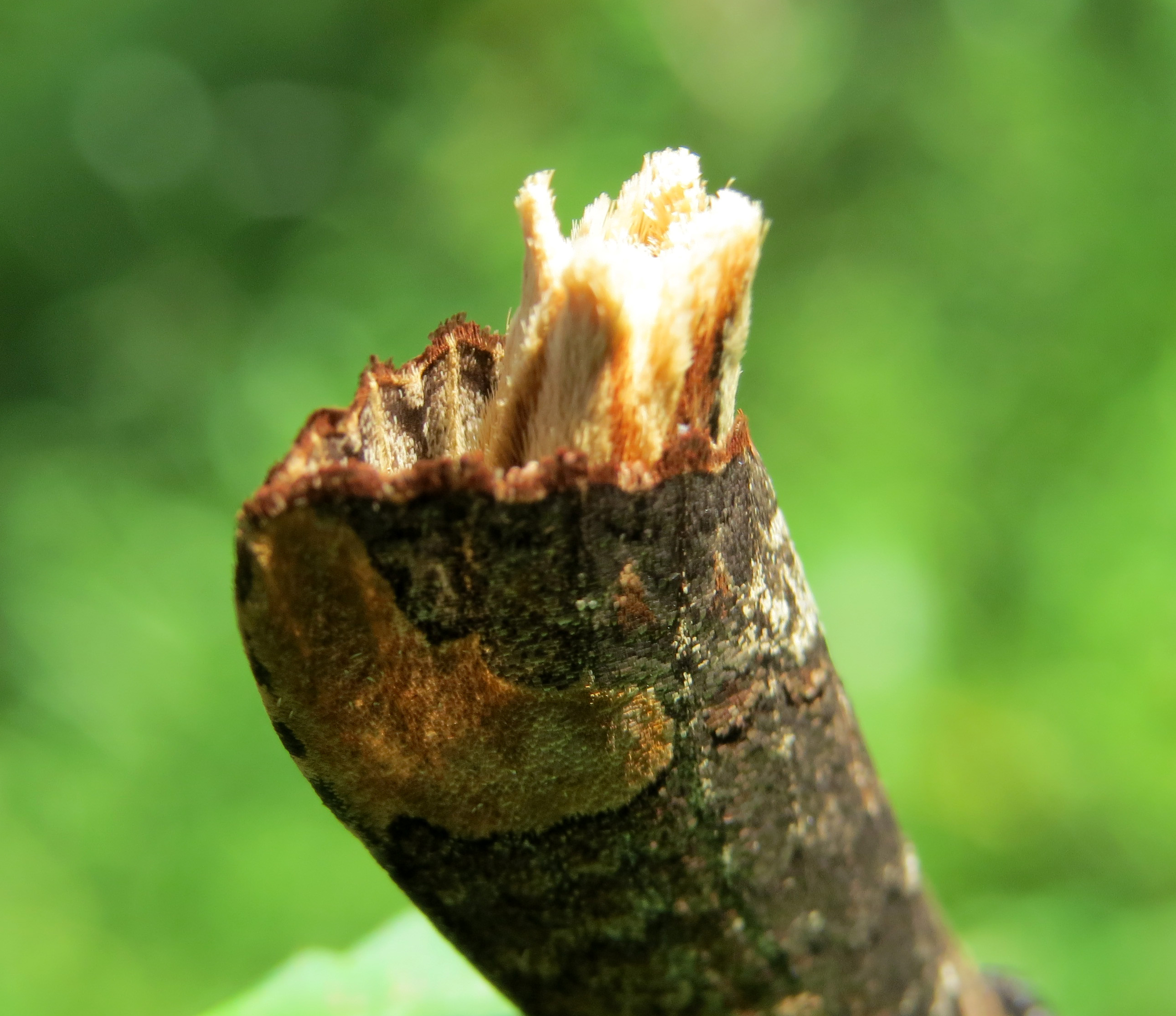
Tip of abdomen
