= Poecilopeplus haemopterus =

Scientific classification
- Domain: Eukaryota
- Kingdom: Animalia
- Phylum: Arthropoda
- Class: Insecta
- Order: Coleoptera
- Suborder: Polyphaga
- Infraorder: Cucujiformia
- Family: Cerambycidae
- Genus: Poecilopeplus
- Species: P. haemopterus

Binomial name
- Poecilopeplus haemopterus (H. Lucas, 1857)

Species of beetle

Poecilopeplus haemopterus is a species of beetle in the family Cerambycidae. It was described by Hippolyte Lucas in 1857.
