= Poecilopeplus corallifer =

Scientific classification
- Domain: Eukaryota
- Kingdom: Animalia
- Phylum: Arthropoda
- Class: Insecta
- Order: Coleoptera
- Suborder: Polyphaga
- Infraorder: Cucujiformia
- Family: Cerambycidae
- Genus: Poecilopeplus
- Species: P. corallifer

Binomial name
- Poecilopeplus corallifer (Stum, 1826)

Species of beetle

Poecilopeplus corallifer is a species of beetle in the family Cerambycidae. It was described by Stum in 1826.
