= Plutodes exiguifascia =

Scientific classification
- Kingdom: Animalia
- Phylum: Arthropoda
- Clade: Pancrustacea
- Class: Insecta
- Order: Lepidoptera
- Family: Geometridae
- Genus: Plutodes
- Species: P. exiguifascia

Binomial name
- Plutodes exiguifascia Hampson, 1895

Species of moth

Plutodes exiguifascia is a moth of the family Geometridae first described by George Hampson in 1895. It is found in Sri Lanka.

Its ground color is yellow, where characteristic orange areas are found on it making yellowish tracks.
