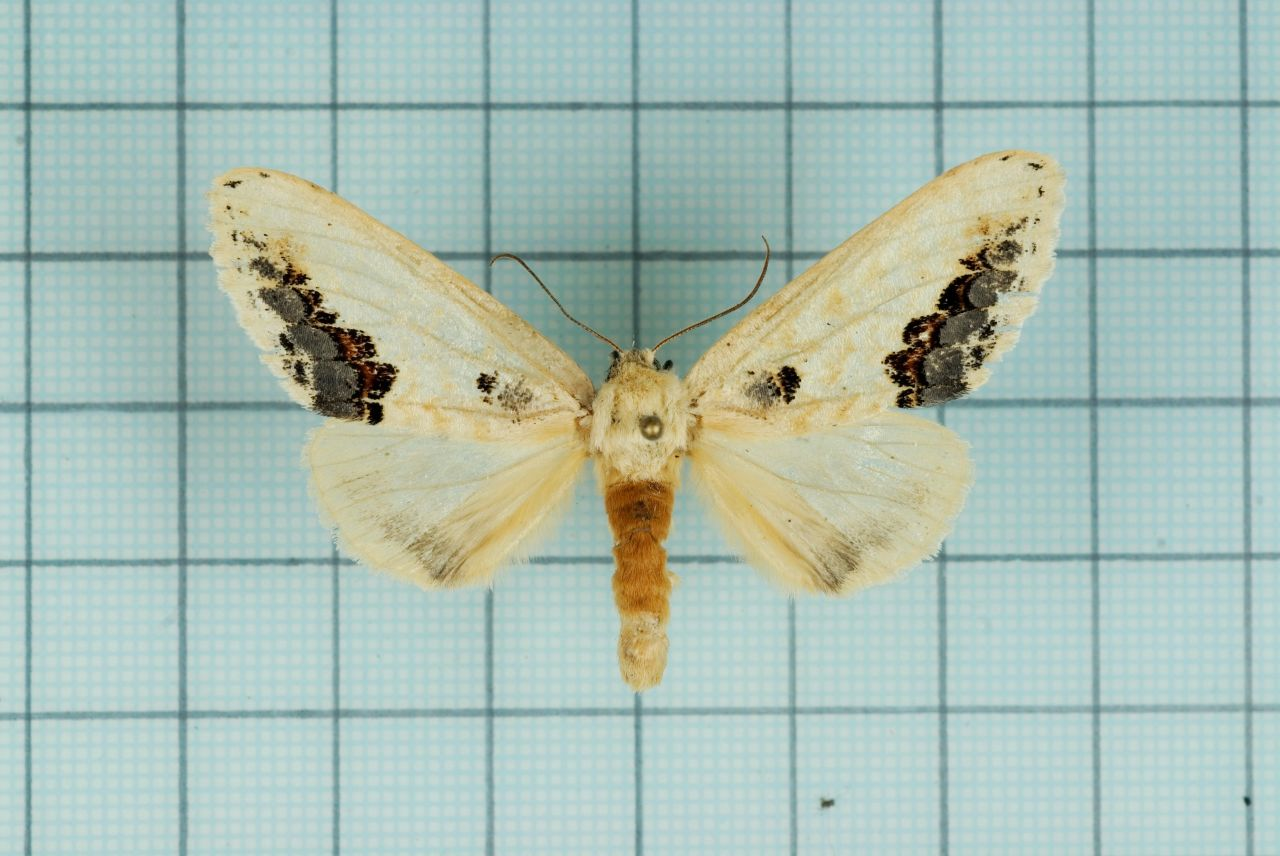

Scientific classification
- Kingdom: Animalia
- Phylum: Arthropoda
- Class: Insecta
- Order: Lepidoptera
- Superfamily: Noctuoidea
- Family: Notodontidae
- Genus: Phalera
- Species: P. flavescens

Binomial name
- Phalera flavescens (Bremer & Grey, 1852)

Synonyms
- Phalera flavescens kuangtungensis Mell, 1931; Phalera flavescens alticola Mell, 1931

= Phalera flavescens =

Species of moth

Phalera flavescens is a nocturnal moth of the family Notodontidae. It is found in Taiwan, China, Japan and Korea.

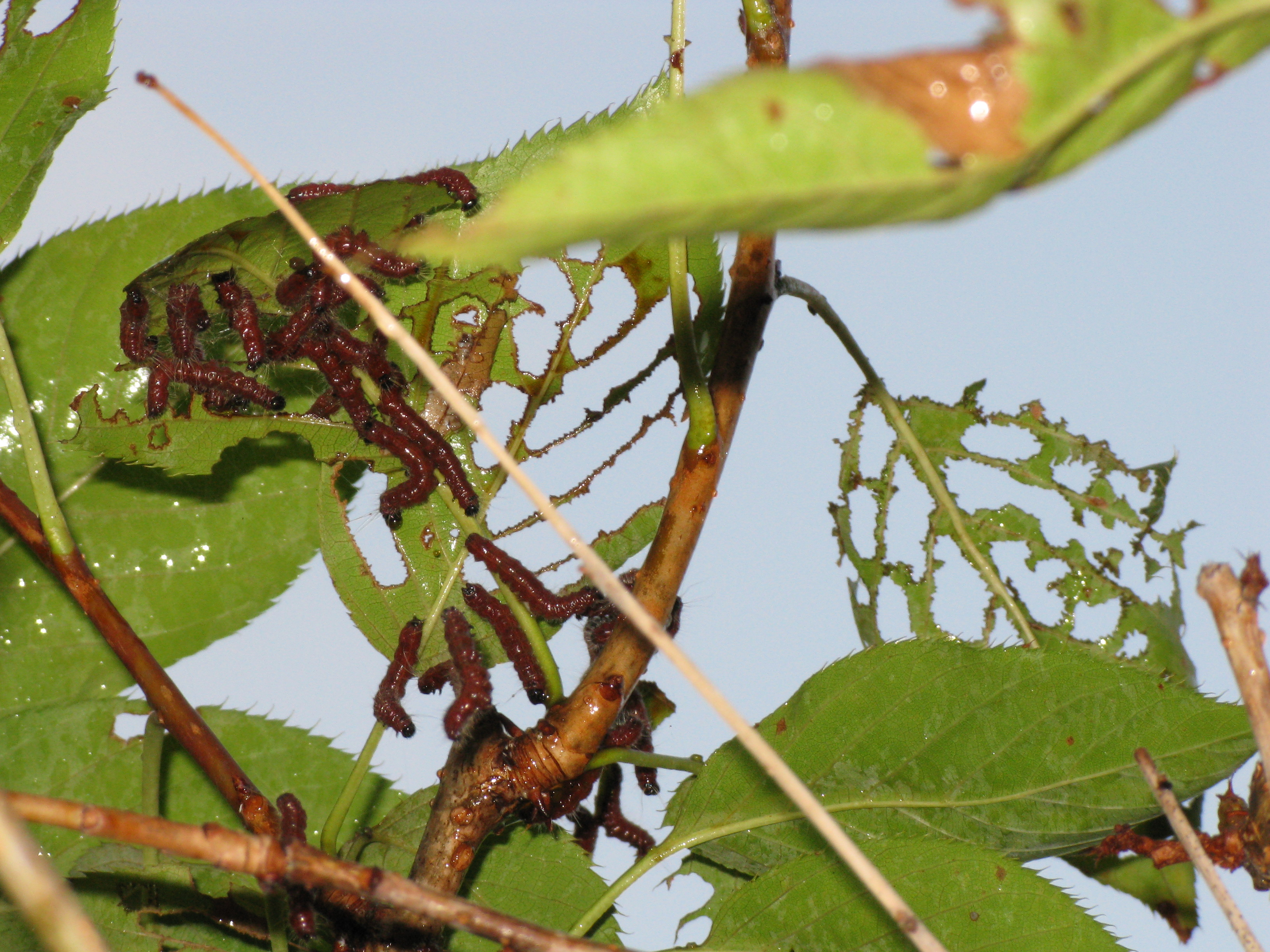
Damage

The wingspan is 45–54 for males and 55–59 mm for females.

== Ecology ==
They have been known to be eaten by Formica japonica, a species of diurnal ant.
