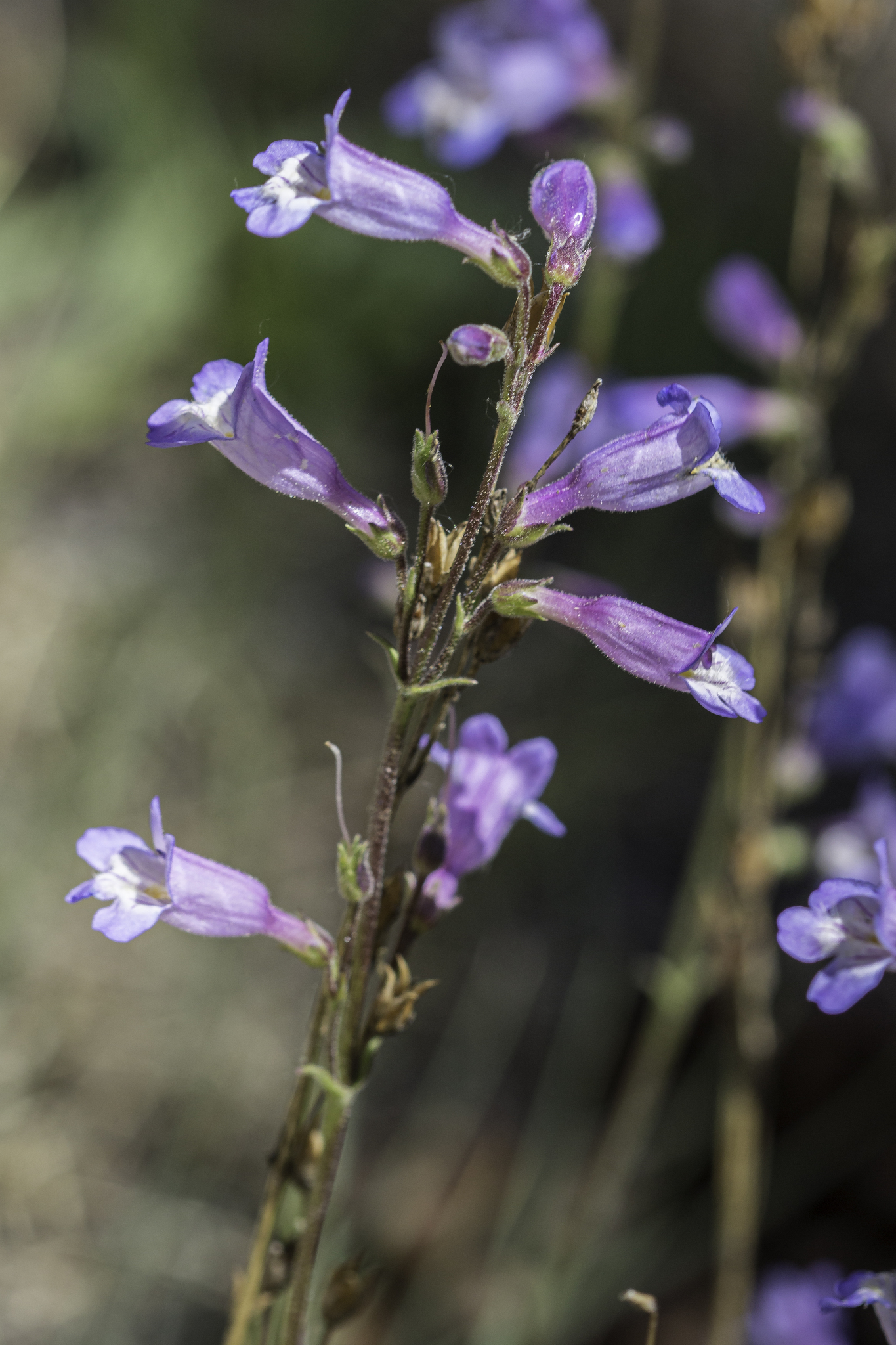
- West of Valles Caldera National Preserve

Scientific classification
- Kingdom: Plantae
- Clade: Tracheophytes
- Clade: Angiosperms
- Clade: Eudicots
- Clade: Asterids
- Order: Lamiales
- Family: Plantaginaceae
- Genus: Penstemon
- Species: P. inflatus

Binomial name
- Penstemon inflatus Crosswh.

= Penstemon inflatus =

Plant species in the veronica family

Penstemon inflatus is a species of the veronica family that grows only in the state of New Mexico in the western United States.

== Description ==
Penstemon inflatus is a perennial plant with one or more flowering stems that can be 10 to 70 centimeters (4–27.5 in) tall, but are usually at least 17 cm (6.5 in). The stems are more or less covered in backwards pointing hairs towards the base and also somewhat covered in glandular hairs further up, but are never glaucous.

Plants have both stem and basal leaves, but by the time they flower the basal ones are often absent. The leaves are not leathery and only hairy on the leaf stems and midveins, but are slightly waxy. The leaves on the stems are similar to the basal leaves, but become narrower further up. Basal leaves and the lowest stem leaves are 1.2 to 12 cm long and 0.3 to 2.8 cm wide with a narrow lanceolate shape and a smooth edge. Stems will have four to six pairs of leaves attached to opposite sides of the stem with a short leaf stem or the base directly attached to the main stem.

The blue flowers are moderate sized for a penstemon with a pale-white throat and a golden bearded staminode. The funnel shaped flower tube abruptly expands, described as inflating, and have straight red-purple floral guide lines on the lower side. The overall length of the fused petal is 1.7–2.7 cm and they are covered with glandular hairs on the outside. Flowering can begin as early as June and can occur as late as October, but is infrequent after August.

The fruit is a capsule 8–10 millimeters long and 3.2–4 mm wide.

== Taxonomy ==
In 1965 Frank Samuel Crosswhite scientifically described this species and named it Penstemon inflatus. He classified it in the genus Penstemon which is part of the Plantaginaceae family. It has no subspecies or botanical synonyms.

=== Names ===
The species name, inflatus, means 'enlarged' or 'distended' in Botanical Latin. It is called the inflated beardtongue by the Natural Resources Conservation Service.

== Range and habitat ==
Most of the range of Penstemon inflatus is in Sangre de Cristo Range in northern New Mexico with some to the south in the Sandia–Manzano Mountains. It is endemic to New Mexico with the species well documented in Colfax and Taos counties in the north and San Miguel, Santa Fe, Bernalillo, and Torrance counties further south.

It grows in piñon–juniper woodlands, Rocky Mountain ponderosa pine forests, and with the Rocky Mountain Douglas-fir, in meadows and on hillsides. It can be found at elevations of 2,000 to 3,400 meters (6,600–11,200 ft). Penstemon inflatus has not yet been assigned a conservation status by NatureServe.

== See also ==
- List of Penstemon species
