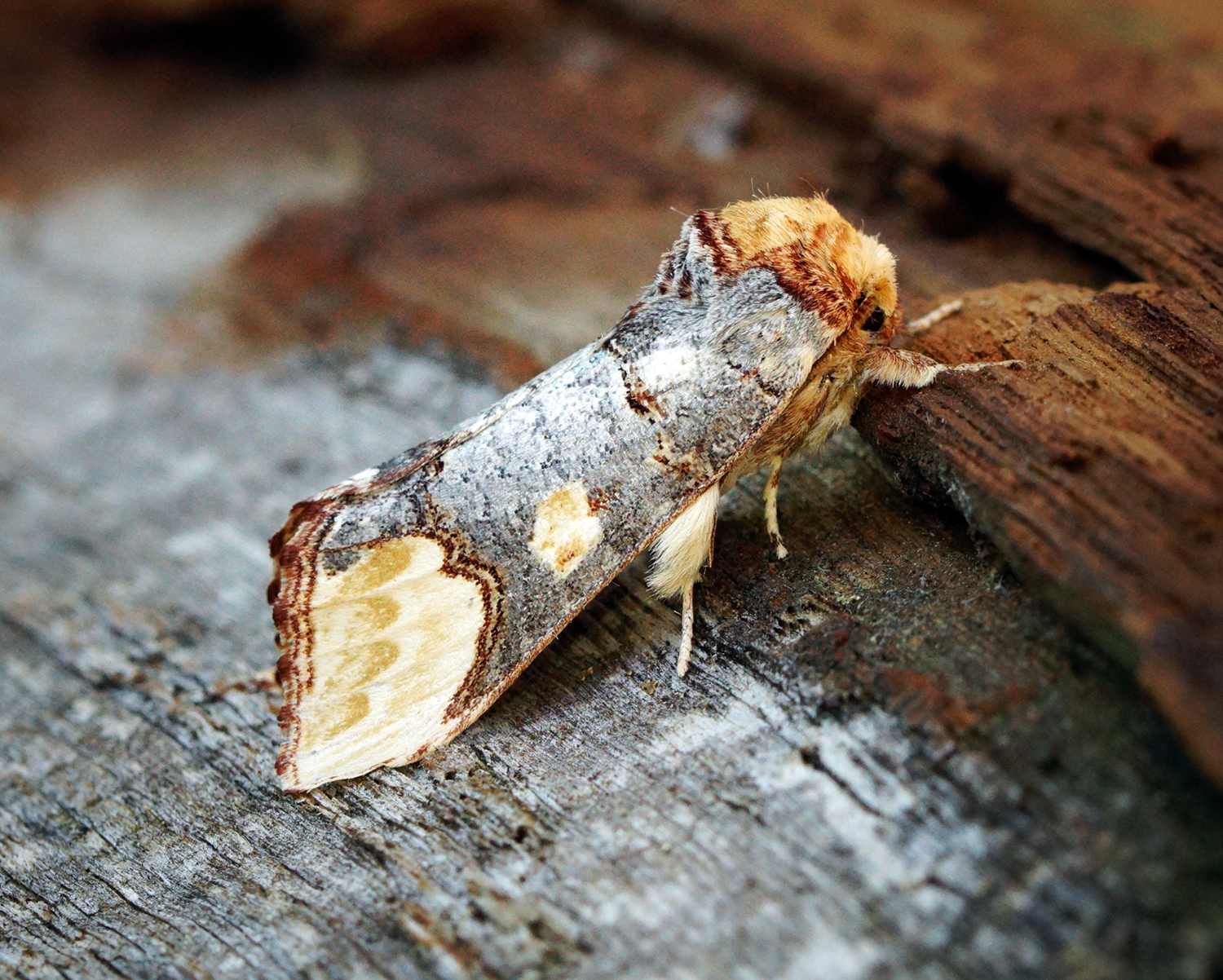

Scientific classification
- Domain: Eukaryota
- Kingdom: Animalia
- Phylum: Arthropoda
- Class: Insecta
- Order: Lepidoptera
- Superfamily: Noctuoidea
- Family: Notodontidae
- Genus: Phalera
- Species: P. bucephaloides

Binomial name
- Phalera bucephaloides (Ochsenheimer, 1810)

= Phalera bucephaloides =

Species of moth

Phalera bucephaloides is a moth of the family Notodontidae first described by Ferdinand Ochsenheimer in 1810. It is found in Europe, south of Tyrol, Hungary and the Balkans.

The wingspan is 23–27 mm. The moths are on wing from May to August.

The larvae feed on Quercus species and Arbutus unedo.

== Subspecies ==
- P. b. bucephaloides
- P. b. syriaca

== Sources ==
- P.-C. Rougeot, P. Viette (1978). Guide des papillons nocturnes d'Europe et d'Afrique du Nord. Delachaux et Niestlé (Lausanne).
