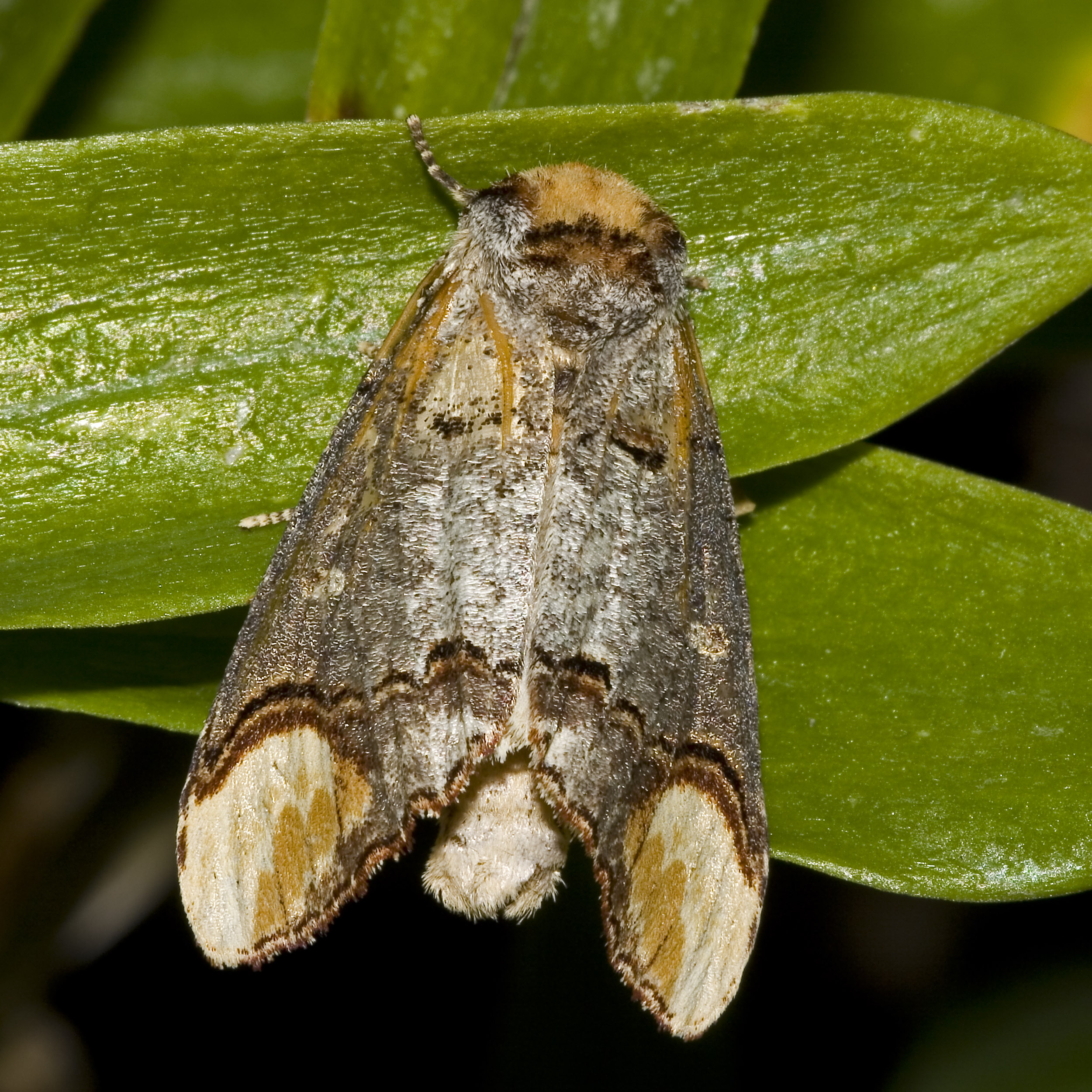
- Phalera bucephala

Scientific classification
- Kingdom: Animalia
- Phylum: Arthropoda
- Clade: Pancrustacea
- Class: Insecta
- Order: Lepidoptera
- Superfamily: Noctuoidea
- Family: Notodontidae
- Subfamily: Phalerinae
- Genus: Phalera; Hübner, 1819

= Phalera (moth) =

Genus of moths

Phalera is a genus of moths of the family Notodontidae.

== Species ==
- Phalera acutoides Holloway, 1983.
- Phalera albizzae Mell, 1931.
- Phalera albocalceolata (Bryk, 1950).
- Phalera alpherakyi Leech, 1898.
- Phalera amboinae (Felder, 1861).
- Phalera angustipennis Matsumura, 1919.
- Phalera argenteolepis Schintlmeister, 1997.
- Phalera assimilis (Bremer & Grey, 1852).
- Phalera banksi Holloway, 1983.
- Phalera bucephala (Linnaeus, 1758).
- Phalera bucephalina (Staudinger et Rebel, 1901).
- Phalera bucephaloides (Ochsenheimer, 1810).
- Phalera combusta (Walker, 1855).
- Phalera cossioides Walker, 1863.
- Phalera eminens Schintlmeister, 1997.
- Phalera erconvalda (Schaus, ?1928).
- Phalera flavescens (Bremer et Gery, 1852).
- Phalera goniophora Hampson, 1910.
- Phalera grotei Moore, 1859.
- Phalera hadrian Schintlmeister, 1989.
- Phalera huangtiao Schintlmeister et Fang, 2001.
- Phalera javana Moore, 1859.
- Phalera mangholda (Schaus, 1928).
- Phalera minor Nagano, 1916.
- Phalera niveomaculata Kiriakoff, 1963.
- Phalera obscura Wileman, 1910.
- Phalera ora Schintlmeister, 1989.
- Phalera ordgara Schaus, 1928.
- Phalera parivala Moore, 1859.
- Phalera raya Moore, 1849.
- Phalera sangana Moore, 1859.
- Phalera sebrus Schintlmeister, 1989.
- Phalera styx Holloway, 1983.
- Phalera sundana Holloway, 1982.
- Phalera surigaona Schaus.
- Phalera takasagoensis Matsumura, 1919.
- Phalera torpida Walker, 1865.
- Phalera wanqu Schintlmeister et Fang, 2001
