= Pseudomonas flavescens =

Scientific classification
- Domain: Bacteria
- Kingdom: Pseudomonadati
- Phylum: Pseudomonadota
- Class: Gammaproteobacteria
- Order: Pseudomonadales
- Family: Pseudomonadaceae
- Genus: Pseudomonas
- Species: P. flavescens

Binomial name
- Pseudomonas flavescens Hildebrand, et al. 1994

Type strain
- ATCC 51555 CCUG 49622; CFBP 5586; CIP 104204; DSM 12071; LMG 18387; NCPPB 3063

Species of bacterium

Pseudomonas flavescens is a Gram-negative bacterium that causes blight cankers on walnut trees. Based on 16S rRNA analysis, P. flavescens has been placed in the P. aeruginosa group.
