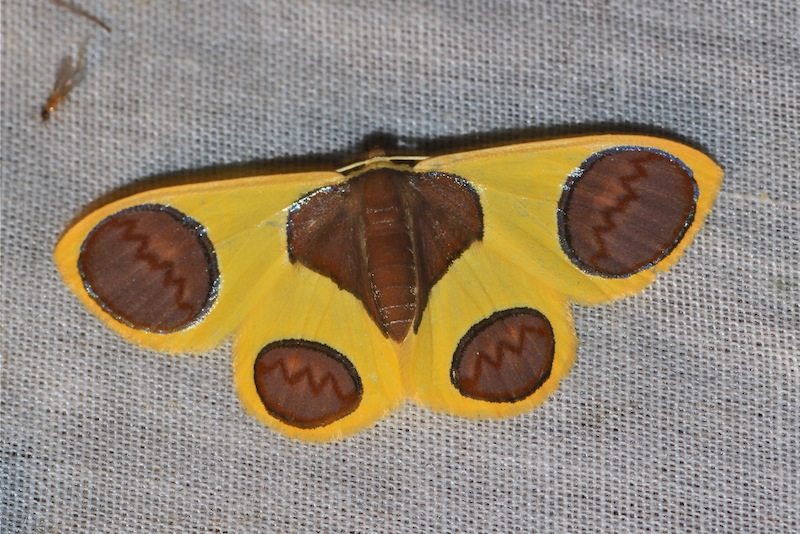

Scientific classification
- Domain: Eukaryota
- Kingdom: Animalia
- Phylum: Arthropoda
- Class: Insecta
- Order: Lepidoptera
- Family: Geometridae
- Genus: Plutodes
- Species: P. flavescens

Binomial name
- Plutodes flavescens Butler, 1880

= Plutodes flavescens =

Species of moth

Plutodes flavescens is a species of moth of the family Geometridae first described by Arthur Gardiner Butler in 1880. It is found in the north-eastern Himalayas and on Borneo, Sumatra and Java.
