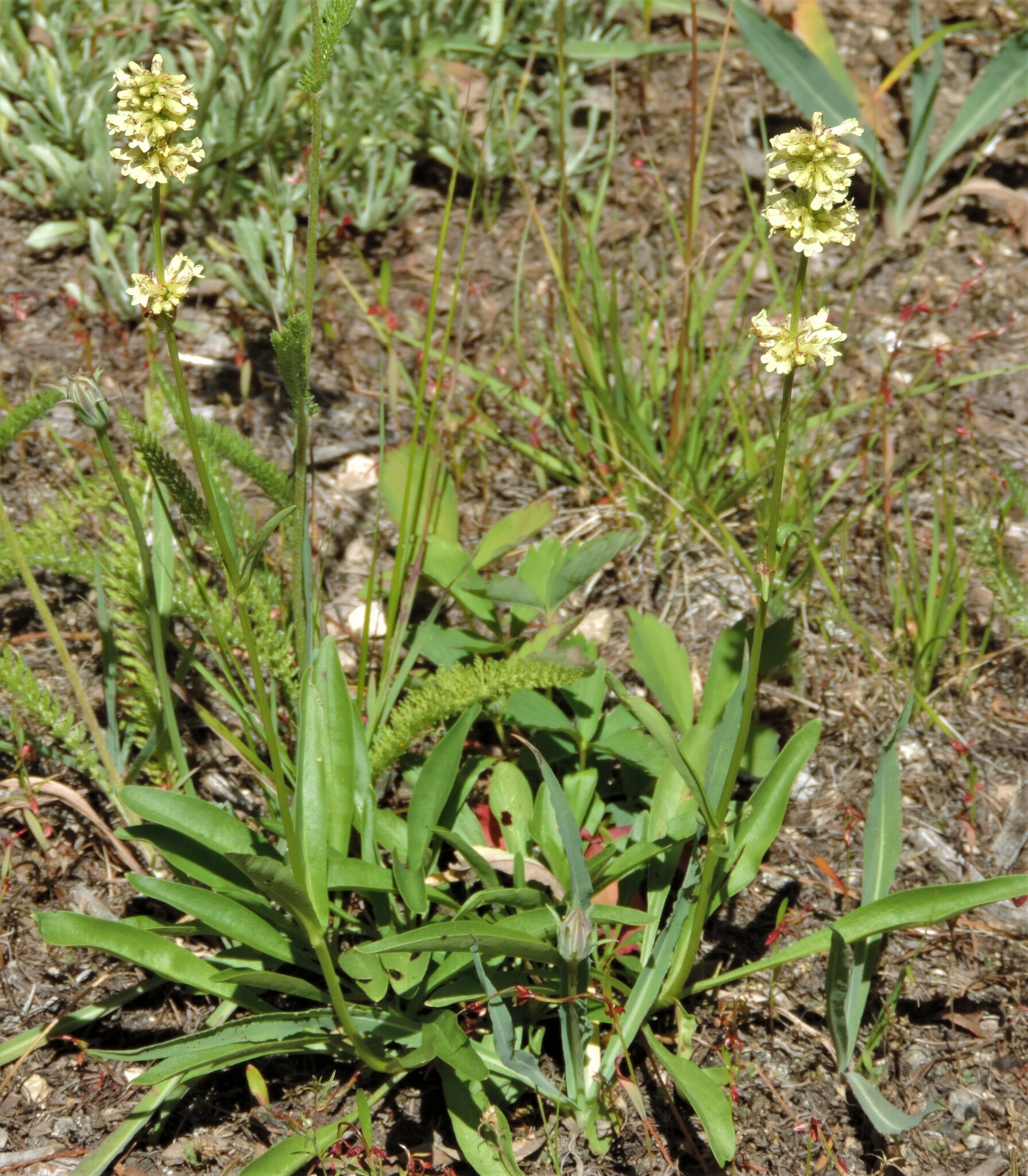

Scientific classification
- Kingdom: Plantae
- Clade: Tracheophytes
- Clade: Angiosperms
- Clade: Eudicots
- Clade: Asterids
- Order: Lamiales
- Family: Plantaginaceae
- Genus: Penstemon
- Species: P. confertus

Binomial name
- Penstemon confertus Douglas

= Penstemon confertus =

Species of plant

Penstemon confertus is a species of flowering plant in the plantain family; its common name is the Yellow beardtoungue. It is native to the US states of Washington, Idaho, and Montana, and the Canadian provinces British Columbia and Alberta.

== Description ==
Penstemon confertus is a yellow-flowered tufted perennial that grows from a woody rhizome to 20 to 50 cm tall. The basal leaves are entire, glabrous, and lanceolate to oblong-lanceolate, up to 15 cm long and 2.5 cm wide, with a petiole about a third to half the length of the leaf. The flower stem has paired leaves that are similar but smaller and are sessile (lack a petiole). The pale yellow to cream colored flowers are held in 2 to 10 compact tiers (verticillasters), each with many flowers. The lowest tier of flowers is often found well below a more congested group of upper tiers. Each flower is up to 12 mm long and has a narrow tube that flairs at the end, with 3 lower lobes and 2 upper lobes. The lower petal is bearded with short white to brown hairs. The anthers are purple.

== Range and habitat ==
Penstemon confertus grows mostly east of the Cascade Mountain divide in Washington, northern Oregon, and southern British Columbia, ranging east to Idaho and western Montana and western Alberta. It grows in forest openings and open slopes mostly at elevations from 300 to 2400 m.

== See also ==
- List of Penstemon species

== Gallery ==
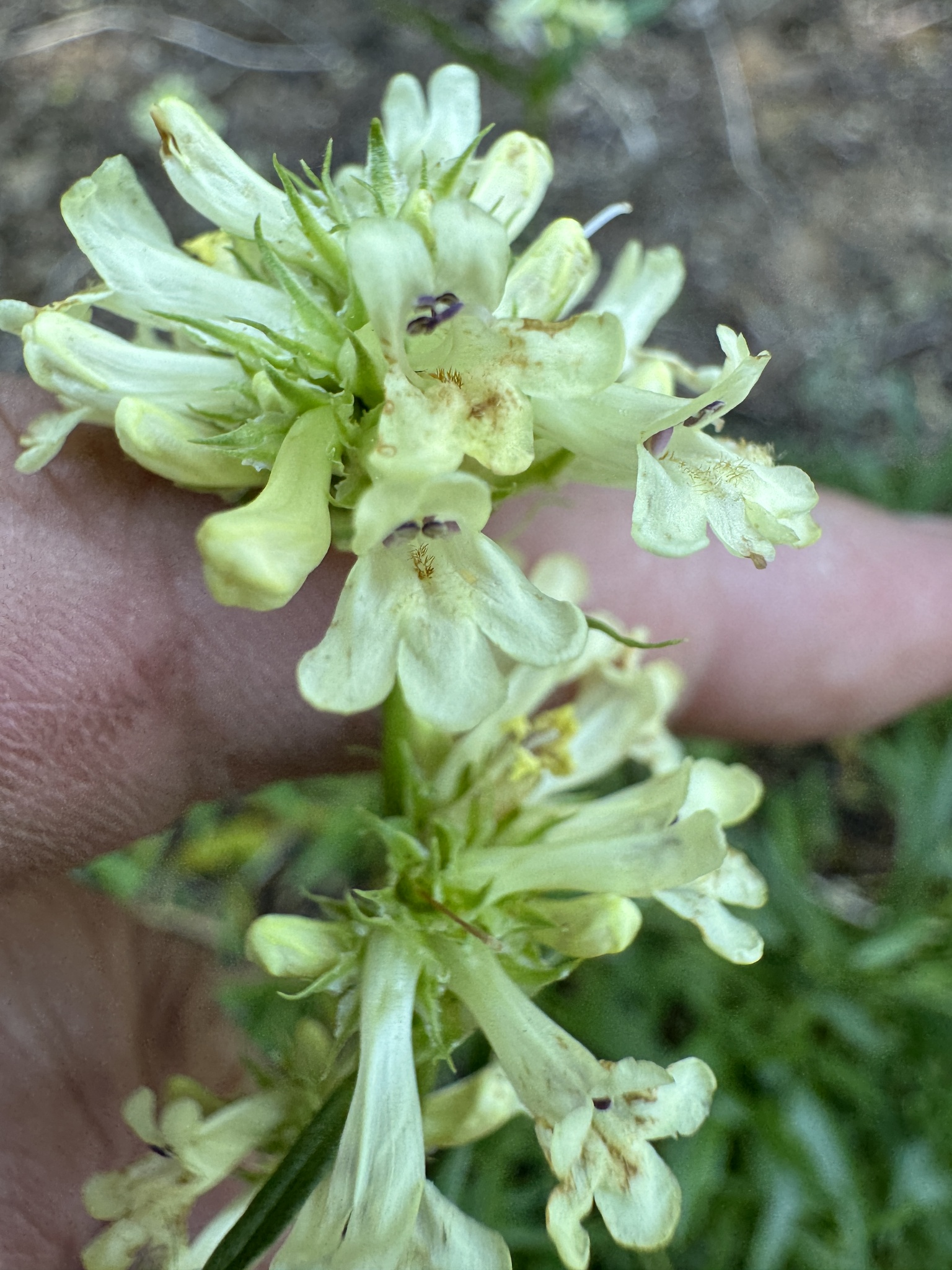
Flowers

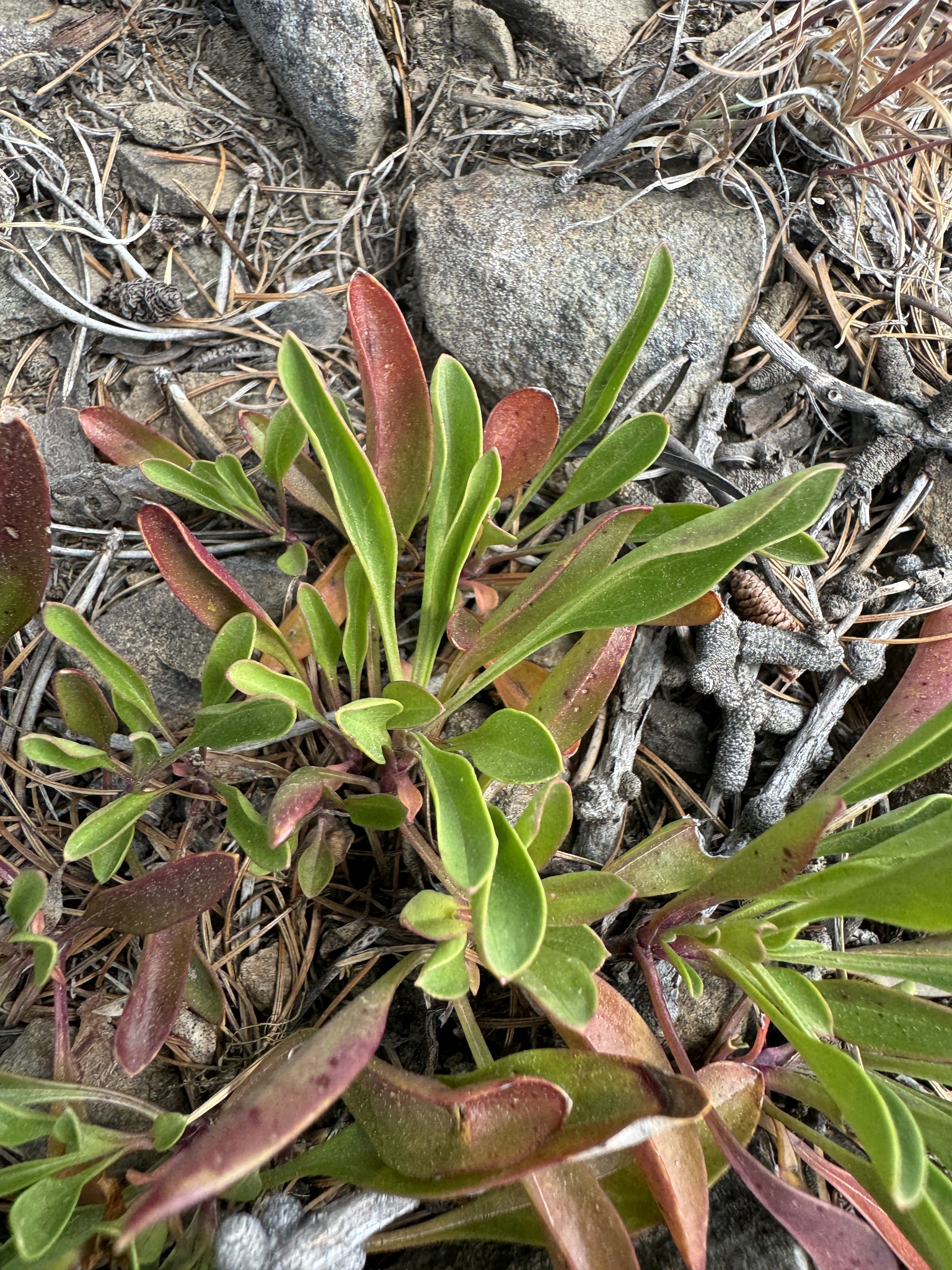
Basal leaves
