= P. acaulis =

P. acaulis may refer to:

- Pedicularis acaulis, a perennial green root parasite plant species in the genus Pedicularis
- Penstemon acaulis, a plant species in the genus Penstemon
- Peperomia acaulis, a radiator plant species in the genus Peperomia
- Phacelia acaulis, a scorpionweed species in the genus Phacelia
- Phoenix acaulis, a palm species endemic to northern India and Nepal
- Primula acaulis, a garden plant species

== Synonyms ==
- Podococcus acaulis, a synonym for Podococcus barteri, a palm species found in tropical Africa
