= Penstemon nudiflorus =

Conservation status
- Imperiled (NatureServe)

Scientific classification
- Kingdom: Plantae
- Clade: Tracheophytes
- Clade: Angiosperms
- Clade: Eudicots
- Clade: Asterids
- Order: Lamiales
- Family: Plantaginaceae
- Genus: Penstemon
- Species: P. nudiflorus

Binomial name
- Penstemon nudiflorus A.Gray

Plant species in the veronica family

Penstemon nudiflorus, the Flagstaff penstemon, is a rare species in the veronica family from the Mogollon Rim in northern Arizona.

== Description ==
Flagstaff penstemons are herbaceous plants with flowering stems that grow straight upwards, typically to a height of 55 to 100 centimeters (21.5–39.5 in), but occasionally are just 35 cm (14 in).

Plants can have both basal leaves and leaves attached to the stems, but in some cases the basal leaves are small or entirely missing. They are leathery in texture and hairless with a blue-white waxy coating. The lowest stem leaves and the basal leaves measure 2.5–11 centimeters (1–4.5 in) with a typical width of 1–2.7 cm (0.5–1 in), but sometimes as narrow as 4 millimeters. The stems have three to six pairs of leaves, the upper ones measuring 0.5–10.5 cm long and 0.1–3 cm wide.

Blooming is in May and June. The flowers are funnel shaped and lavender to orchid in color, with red-purple floral guide lines. They measure 2–3.3 cm (1–1.5 in) long and only have sparse white hairs on the lower surface inside the flower tube. They are in 5 to 13 groups each with one or two points of attachment that branch to support two or sometimes three flowers.

The fruit is a capsule 8–10 mm long and 3–4 mm wide.

== Taxonomy ==
In 1885 a new species in the genus Penstemon was described by the botanist Asa Gray and named Penstemon nudiflorus. Together with its genus it is classified in the Plantaginaceae family and the species has no synonyms. Gray described the species using specimens collected by Mr. and Mrs. Lemmon in 1884 near Flagstaff, Arizona in La Vergne Park.

=== Names ===
The species name, nudiflorus, means with "naked flowers" in Botanical Latin. The species name may refer to the hairless flowers, but it others think it is a reference to the open inflorescence. Penstemon nudiflorus is known by the common name Flagstaff penstemon or Flagstaff beardtongue.

== Range and habitat ==
The Flagstaff penstemon is endemic to the central part of northern Arizona where it mostly grows along the Mogollon Rim. Historically it has been found in Mohave, Coconino, Yavapai, Gila, and Navajo counties. However, from 1995 to 2015 it was only been found in Coconino and Yavapai counties with available documentation uncertain if this was due to local extinction of the species or a lack of surveys.

The species grows in pinyon–juniper woodlands on rocky, basaltic soils at elevations of 1,500–2,300 meters (4,900–7,500 ft). Although it grows in a fairly dry habitat, it requires moisture during the winter.

=== Conservation ===
In 2015 NatureServe evaluated the Flagstaff penstemon in 2015 and at that time rated it imperiled at the global and state level (G2, S2). The species has never been common and is impacted by grazing, both by direct destruction of individuals and alteration of its habitat.

== See also ==
List of Penstemon species
