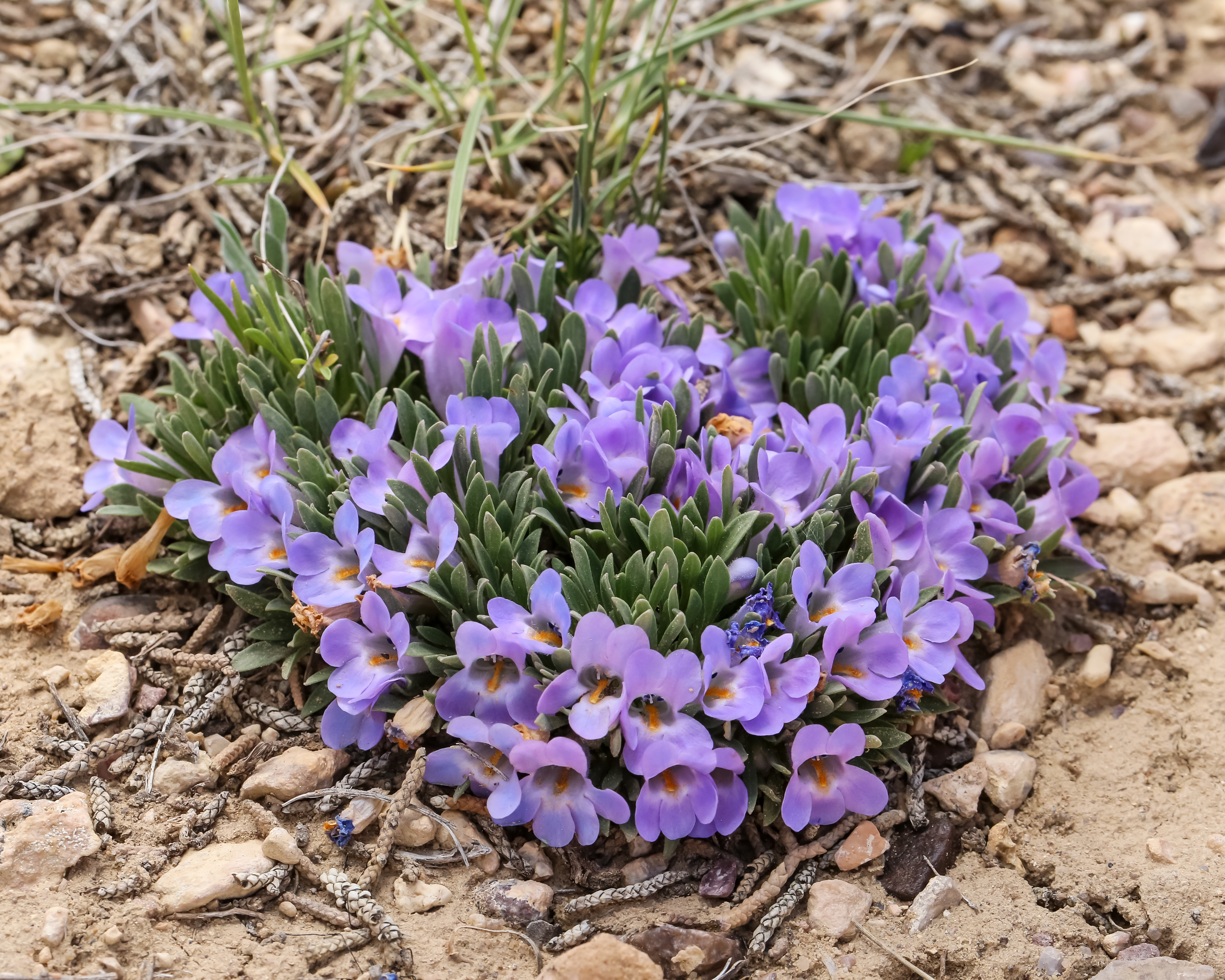
- Flowering north of Dinosaur National Monument, Colorado

Conservation status
- Imperiled (NatureServe)

Scientific classification
- Kingdom: Plantae
- Clade: Tracheophytes
- Clade: Angiosperms
- Clade: Eudicots
- Clade: Asterids
- Order: Lamiales
- Family: Plantaginaceae
- Genus: Penstemon
- Species: P. yampaensis

Binomial name
- Penstemon yampaensis Penland, 1958

Synonyms
- Penstemon acaulis var. yampaensis (Penland) Neese (1986)

= Penstemon yampaensis =

Plant species in the plantain family

Penstemon yampaensis, the Yampa penstemon, is a rare species of plant from the western United States. It grows in the Yampa River drainage of Colorado and Wyoming and westward into Utah. It is one of the more unusual penstemons, having almost no stem. It is threatened from habitat disturbance, particularly the invasion of the non-native cheatgrass.

== Description ==
Penstemon yampaensis is a very short species of plant, its stems only reaching 1 centimeter in length. The stems are prostrate, laying flat on the ground, or somewhat ascending, stems growing upwards slightly, forming a mat up to about 30 centimeters (1 ft) in diameter. The stems are scabrous or puberulent in texture, rough to the touch with stiff hairs or covered in short fine hairs. They grow from a branched rootstock.

The leaves of Penstemon yampaensis may be attached directly to the stems or to the base of the plant without petioles (leaf stems). Their surface texture is rough, but not leathery. Leaves are usually 15–25 millimeters long, but may reach as much as 35 mm in length. The leaves are much narrower usually only 1.5–2.6 millimeters wide, though occasionally as much as 4.5 mm. They range in shape from narrow like grass to oblanceolate, with the wider part past the middle of the leaf. The edges of the leaves are smooth or very faintly toothed and they taper to the base.

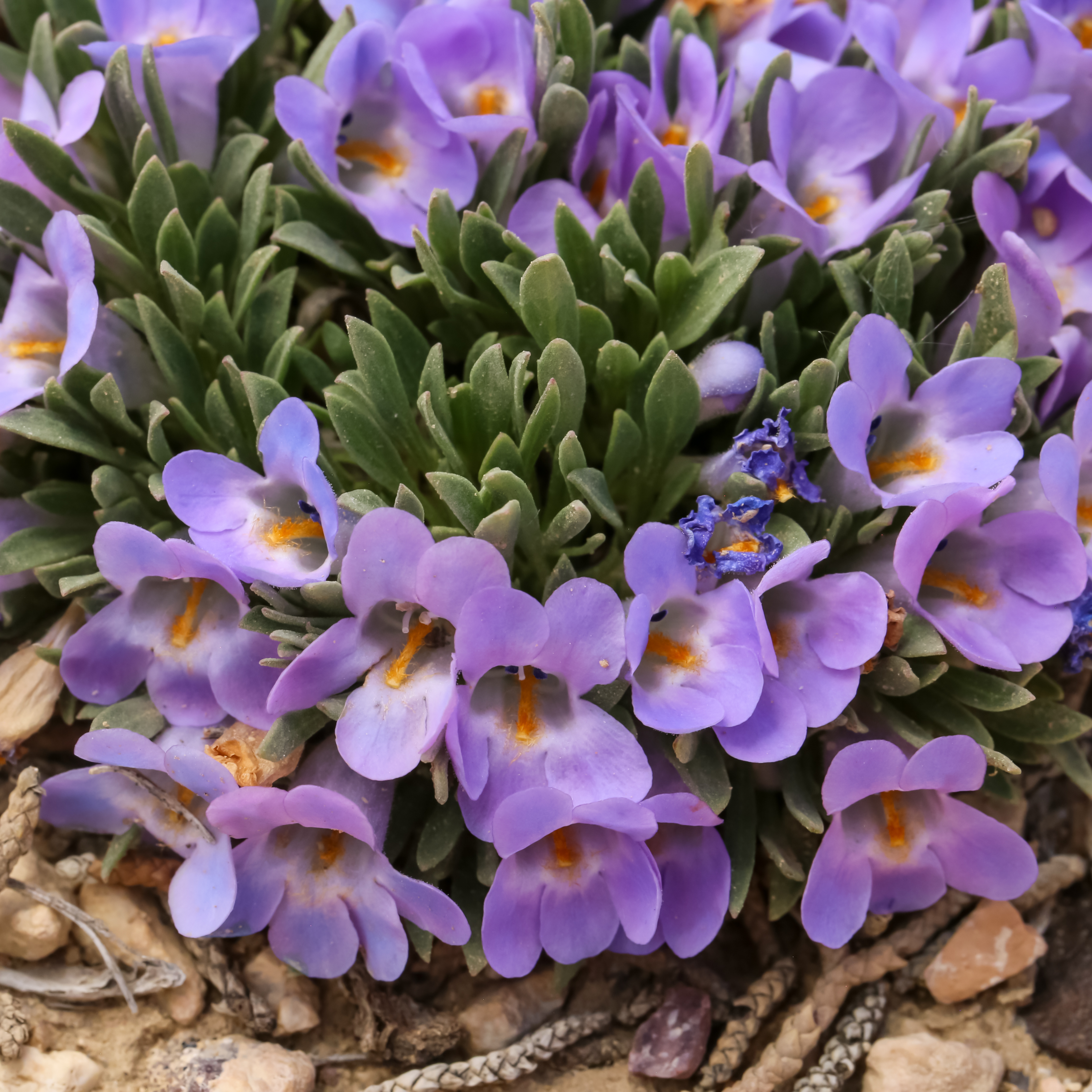
Flowers with the orange staminode

The flowers are found on the outermost branches, usually four together, but as many as six or as few as two. The lobes of the fused sepals are lanceolate, spear head shaped, and 5–6.5 mm long. The flower is a funnel shaped tube, bluish lavender to lavender in color, and 14–18 mm in length. The flower does not have nectar guides and has pale yellow to whitish fine hairs inside the tube. The opening of the flower is not constricted and the longer pair of stamens reach the opening. The sterile staminode is covered in orange hairs on its upper side and reached beyond the flower opening. They may bloom as early as the month of May or as late as July.

The fruit of is a capsule 3.5–5 mm long by 3–4 mm wide. Two to four seeds are contained in each capsule, each 2–3 mm and black in color with a rough surface.

== Taxonomy ==
Penstemon yampaensis was given a scientific description as a species and named by Charles William Theodore Penland (1899-1982) in 1958. In some sources, such as the Flora of North America, the alternate spelling Penstemon yampaënsis is used for this species. In 1986 Elizabeth Chase Neese (1934-2008) published a description of the species as a variety of the similar Penstemon acaulis, however it is listed as an accepted species by Plants of the World Online, World Flora Online, and World Plants.

The extremely low growing habit with such short stems makes it one of the most unusual members of the Penstemon genus, along with its close relative, Penstemon acaulis.

== Range and habitat ==
Penstemon yampaensis has a natural distribution near where the states of Colorado, Utah, and Wyoming meet. It is recorded from just four counties. In Colorado it grows in Moffat County at the northwest corner of the state. In Utah it grows in two counties in the easternmost portion of the state Daggett and Uintah . To the north it is found in Sweetwater County, Wyoming. There are less than 40 known locations where it grows across its range.

The Yampa penstemon grows in soils originating from weathered sandstone, often on dry ridgetops, ledges, or hilltops. It is associated with sagebrush and pinyon-juniper woodlands.

=== Conservation ===
Penstemon yampaensis was evaluated in 2022 by NatureServe and rated as globally imperiled (G2). They similarly rated it as imperiled (S2) in both Colorado and Utah and as critically imperiled (S1) in Wyoming. It is threatened by invasive plants, especially cheatgrass (Bromus tectorum). It is also impacted by livestock, the long term North American drought, and may also have some of its occurrences disturbed by utility work.

== See also ==
List of Penstemon species
