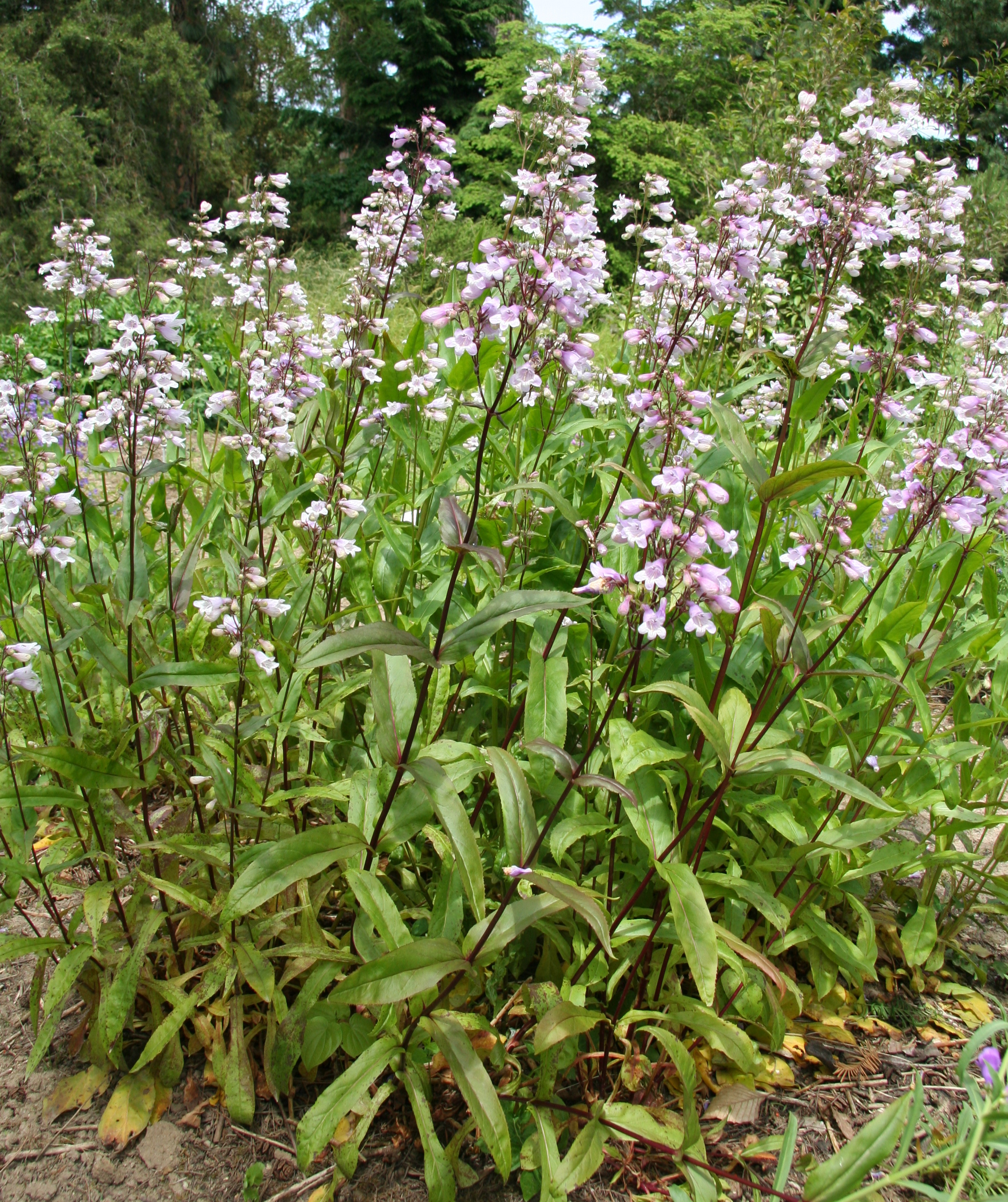

Conservation status
- Secure (NatureServe)

Scientific classification
- Kingdom: Plantae
- Clade: Tracheophytes
- Clade: Angiosperms
- Clade: Eudicots
- Clade: Asterids
- Order: Lamiales
- Family: Plantaginaceae
- Genus: Penstemon
- Species: P. laevigatus

Binomial name
- Penstemon laevigatus Aiton

= Penstemon laevigatus =

Species of flowering plant

Penstemon laevigatus, the eastern smooth beardtongue, is a plant in the plantain family, Plantaginaceae. The flowers are borne in summer. Its native range includes much of the Eastern United States, from Maine to Michigan and Georgia to Mississippi. It can grow in either sunny or shady conditions.
