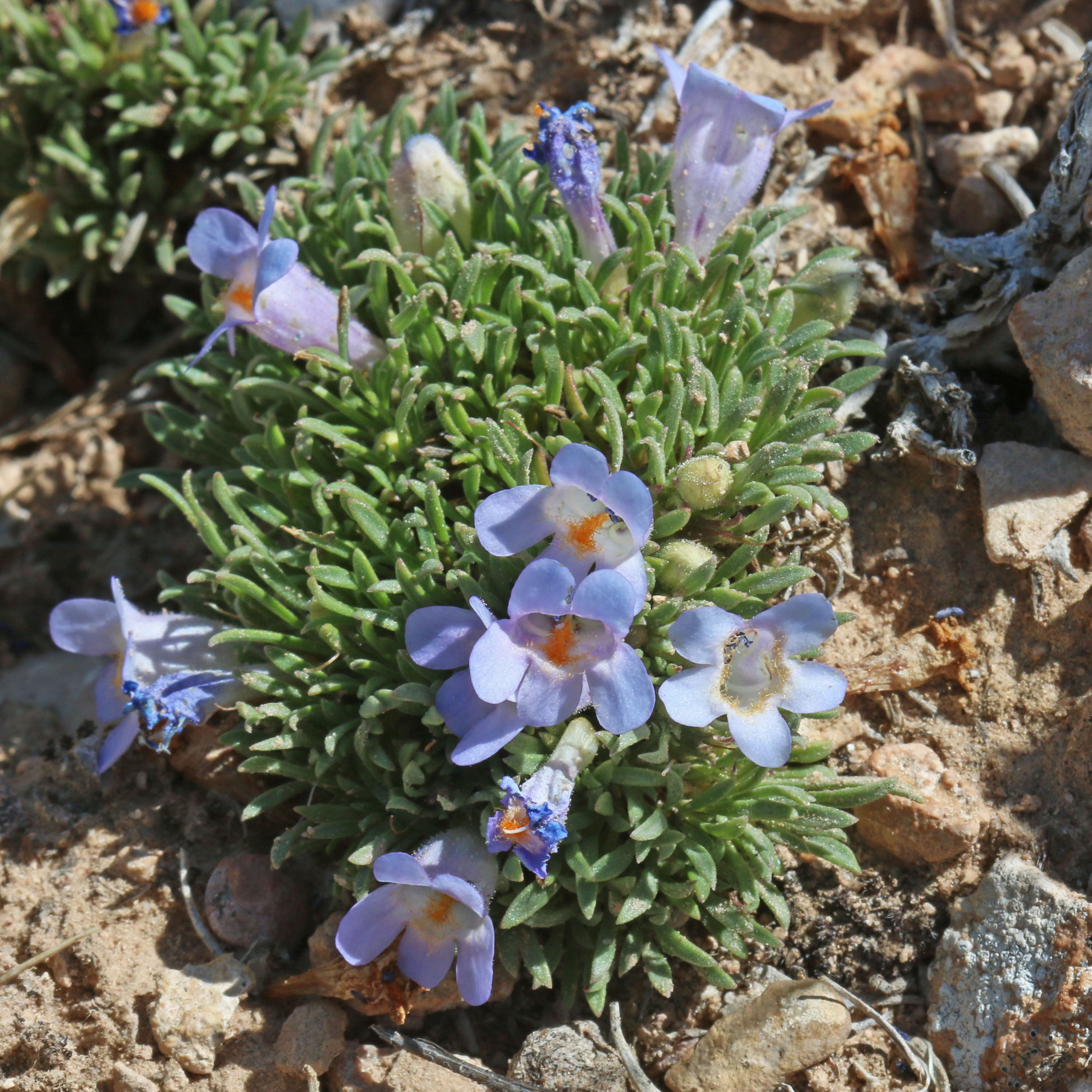
- Sweetwater County, Wyoming, north of Manila, Utah

Conservation status
- Imperiled (NatureServe)

Scientific classification
- Kingdom: Plantae
- Clade: Tracheophytes
- Clade: Angiosperms
- Clade: Eudicots
- Clade: Asterids
- Order: Lamiales
- Family: Plantaginaceae
- Genus: Penstemon
- Species: P. acaulis

Binomial name
- Penstemon acaulis L.O.Williams

= Penstemon acaulis =

Plant species in the veronica family

Penstemon acaulis, the stemless penstemon, is a rare species in the veronica family from the western US where the states of Wyoming and Utah meet.

== Description ==
Stemless penstemons have stems that only reach 1 centimeter in length and are prostrate upon the ground or ascending, but they form mats for leaves up to 30 centimeters (12 in) wide. They grow wider by means of short, rooting stolons with the flowering stems tightly covered in leaves, the older ones becoming woody and frequently branching. The root system is fibrous and the older flowering stems become buried in the remains of leaves and flowers.

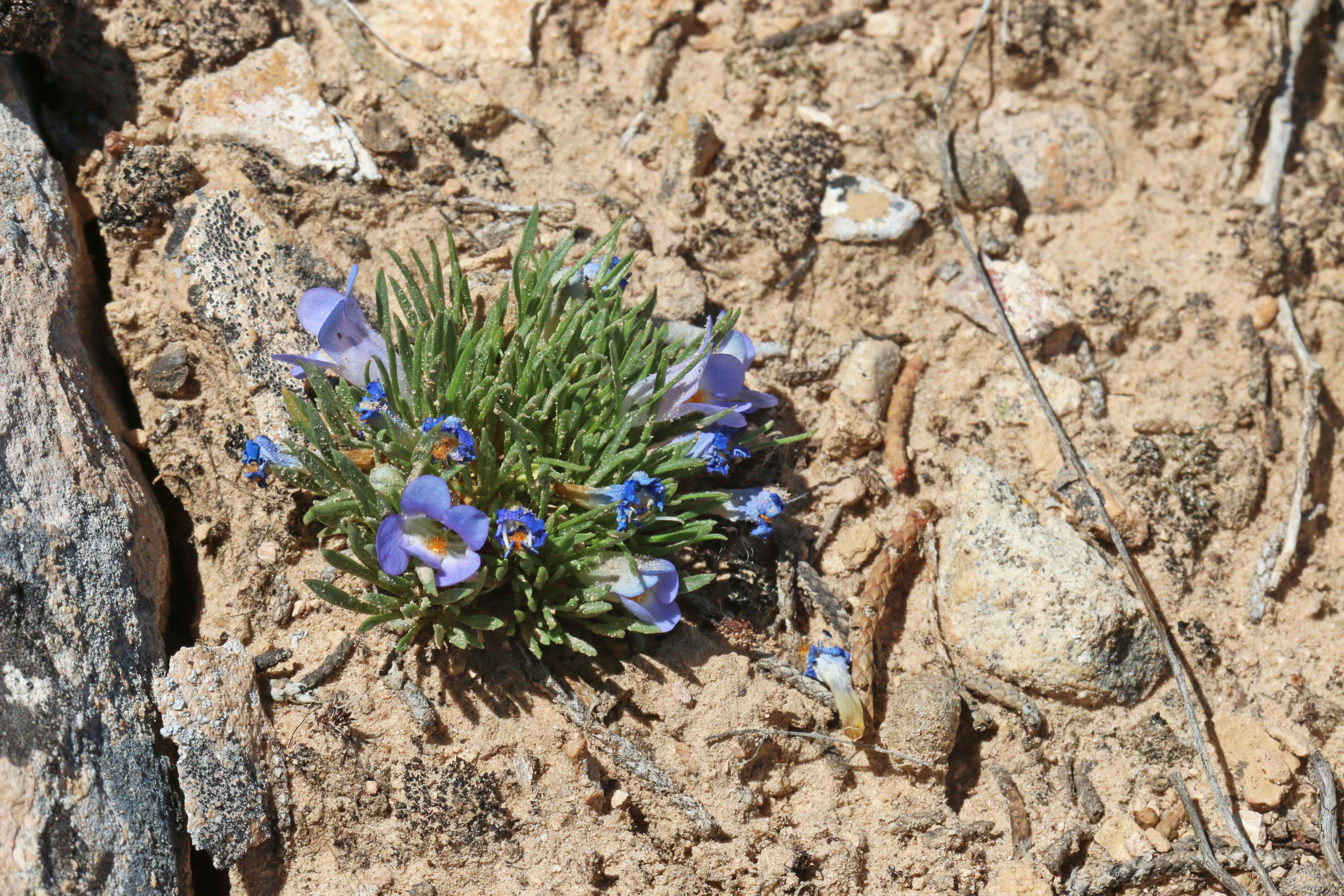
Surrounded by rocky soil in Wyoming

The leaves are scabrous, covered in very short rough papillate hairs, and are not leathery, but are sticky when new. They typically measure just 6 to 15 millimeters long and 0.6 to 1.3 mm wide, though they will occasionally reach 22 mm long and 1.5 mm wide, and are linear like a grass blade. The leaf bases are taper and the tips are sharply pointed.

The flowers are lavender, blue, or violet, lack floral guide lines, and are 11–15 mm long. They are subsessile, almost attaching directly to the stems, each flower nearly always by itself but rarely having two flowers attached to the same point. The flower's lower interior has yellow to white hairs and two ridges. The staminode is 7–9 mm long and extends out of the flowers mouth, covered by dense orange hairs and the longer pair of stamens also might also extend out slightly. The sepals are hidden in the leaves, but have sticky, hairy surfaces and lanceolate lobes 3.5 to 5.5 mm long. Blooming can occur during May, June, or July in its native habitat.

The fruit is a capsule 2.5–3.5 mm long and 2.5–3 mm wide. It is very similar to the Yampa penstemon, but has narrower leaves.

== Taxonomy ==
In 1934 the botanist Louis Otho Williams scientifically described a species which he named Penstemon acaulis. It is classified in the genus Penstemon within the Plantaginaceae family and has no subspecies or synonyms. However, the species Penstemon yampaensis has been described as a variety of it. Williams found the type specimen of the species on 28 May 1932 on a hilltop near McKinnon in Sweetwater County, Wyoming.

=== Names ===
The species name, acaulis, means 'stemless' in Botanical Latin. It is similarly known by the common names stemless penstemon and stemless beardtongue.

== Range and habitat ==
Stemless penstemons are a rare species, only known from two counties; Daggett County, Utah and Sweetwater County, Wyoming. There it is found in the Bridger Basin and Browns Park, where it can be found in close proximity to Yampa penstemons at elevations of 1,500 to 2,500 meters (4,900–8,200 ft). Most known occurrences of the species are west of the Flaming Gorge Reservoir, though a few are found east of it. The total extent of its range is approximately 1,000 to 5,000 square kilometers (390–1,930 sq mi).

It grows in the sagebrush steppe and into woodlands of Utah junipers, on dry, often clay, ridgetops, nearly barren rock ledges, and rocky hills.

=== Conservation ===
When NatureServe evaluated stemless penstemons in 2022 they rated it imperiled at the global level and both Utah and Wyoming. There are approximately 20 locations where it grows with between 100,000 and 1,000,000 plants, but with a short term downward trend in population. Threats to the species include grazing, mining, hydrocarbon extraction, off-road recreation, and climate change. The species is also impacted by the long term drought in the area.

== Cultivation ==
In gardens stemless penstemon is somewhat prone to problems with rotting. Its seeds are reluctant to germinate, requiring a cold-moist stratification for 12-weeks followed by as much as 16-weeks of temperature changes to induce sprouting.

== See also ==
List of Penstemon species
