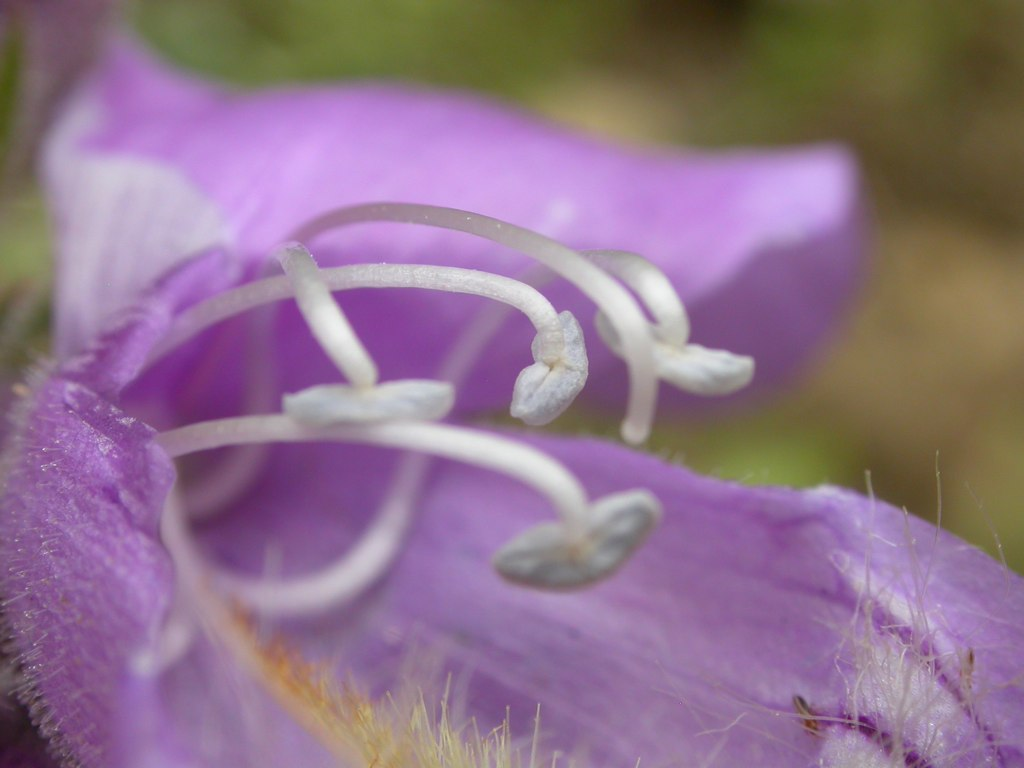

Conservation status
- Apparently Secure (NatureServe)

Scientific classification
- Kingdom: Plantae
- Clade: Tracheophytes
- Clade: Angiosperms
- Clade: Eudicots
- Clade: Asterids
- Order: Lamiales
- Family: Plantaginaceae
- Genus: Penstemon
- Species: P. eriantherus

Binomial name
- Penstemon eriantherus Nutt. ex Pursh

Varieties
- P. e. var. argillosus; P. e. var. cleburnei; P. e. var. eriantherus; P. e. var. redactus; P. e. var. whitedii

= Penstemon eriantherus =

Plant species in the veronica family

Penstemon eriantherus is a species of flowering plant in the plantain family known by the common names fuzzytongue penstemon and crested penstemon. It is native to western North America, where it occurs in western Canada and the northwestern and north-central United States.

This species is a perennial herb growing from a woody caudex and thick taproot. It branches into several stems that reach up to 40 centimeters tall. Much of the herbage is coated in gray hairs, and the inflorescence can be glandular. The oppositely arranged leaves are up to 13 centimeters long and are sometimes slightly toothed along the edges. The flower is borne in a calyx of narrow, pointed sepals. The corolla is up to 4 centimeters long with a mouth up to 1.4 centimeters wide. It is lavender to reddish or bluish purple. The lower lip and the staminode are heavily bearded with yellowish hairs.

This plant grows on clay soils in dry, open habitat. In Washington it grows in plant communities dominated by antelope bitterbrush (Purshia tridentata) and Indian ricegrass (Oryzopsis hymenoides), purple sage (Salvia dorrii) and bluebunch wheatgrass (Pseudoroegneria spicata), and rabbitbrush (Ericameria nauseosa). It occurs on rocky soils in sagebrush habitat. Its ability to live in a relatively rough habitat may help it persist in disturbed areas, such as eroded trails.

== Taxonomy ==
Penstemon eriantherus was scientifically described by Frederick Traugott Pursh in 1813. Pursh credited the name to the Fraser's Catalogue written by Thomas Nuttall. It is classified in the genus Penstemon as part of the Plantaginaceae family. It has five accepted varieties.

- Penstemon eriantherus var. argillosus – Endemic to Oregon
- Penstemon eriantherus var. cleburnei – Native to Wyoming and Utah
- Penstemon eriantherus var. eriantherus – Widespread from British Columbia to Colorado
- Penstemon eriantherus var. redactus – Oregon to Montana
- Penstemon eriantherus var. whitedii – Endemic to Washington state

Penstemon eriantherus has 13 synonyms of the species or one of its five varieties.

Table of Synonyms
Name	Year	Rank	Synonym of:	Notes
Chelone cristata Spreng.	1825	species	var. eriantherus	= het.
Chelone erianthera (Nutt. ex Pursh) Steud.	1821	species	P. eriantherus	≡ hom.
Penstemon cleburnei M.E.Jones	1908	species	var. cleburnei	≡ hom.
Penstemon cristatus Nutt.	1818	species	var. eriantherus	= het.
Penstemon dayanus Howell	1901	species	var. argillosus	= het.
Penstemon eriantherus var. grandis Pennell & D.D.Keck	1938	variety	var. eriantherus	= het.
Penstemon eriantherus var. saliens (Rydb.) Pennell	1920	variety	var. eriantherus	= het.
Penstemon saliens Rydb.	1900	species	var. eriantherus	= het.
Penstemon whitedii Piper	1896	species	var. whitedii	≡ hom.
Penstemon whitedii var. dayanus (Howell) M.Peck	1941	variety	var. argillosus	= het.
Penstemon whitedii subsp. dayanus (Howell) D.D.Keck	1938	subspecies	var. argillosus	= het.
Penstemon whitedii subsp. tristis Pennell & D.D.Keck	1938	subspecies	var. redactus	= het.
Penstemon whitedii subsp. typicus D.D.Keck	1938	subspecies	var. whitedii	≡ hom., not validly publ.
Notes: ≡ homotypic synonym ; = heterotypic synonym

=== Names ===
It is known by the common names crested penstemon, crested beardtongue, crested-tongue beardtongue, fuzzytongue penstemon, fuzzy-tongue penstemon, fuzzy tongue penstemon, or fuzzy-tongue beardtongue.

== See also ==
- List of Penstemon species
