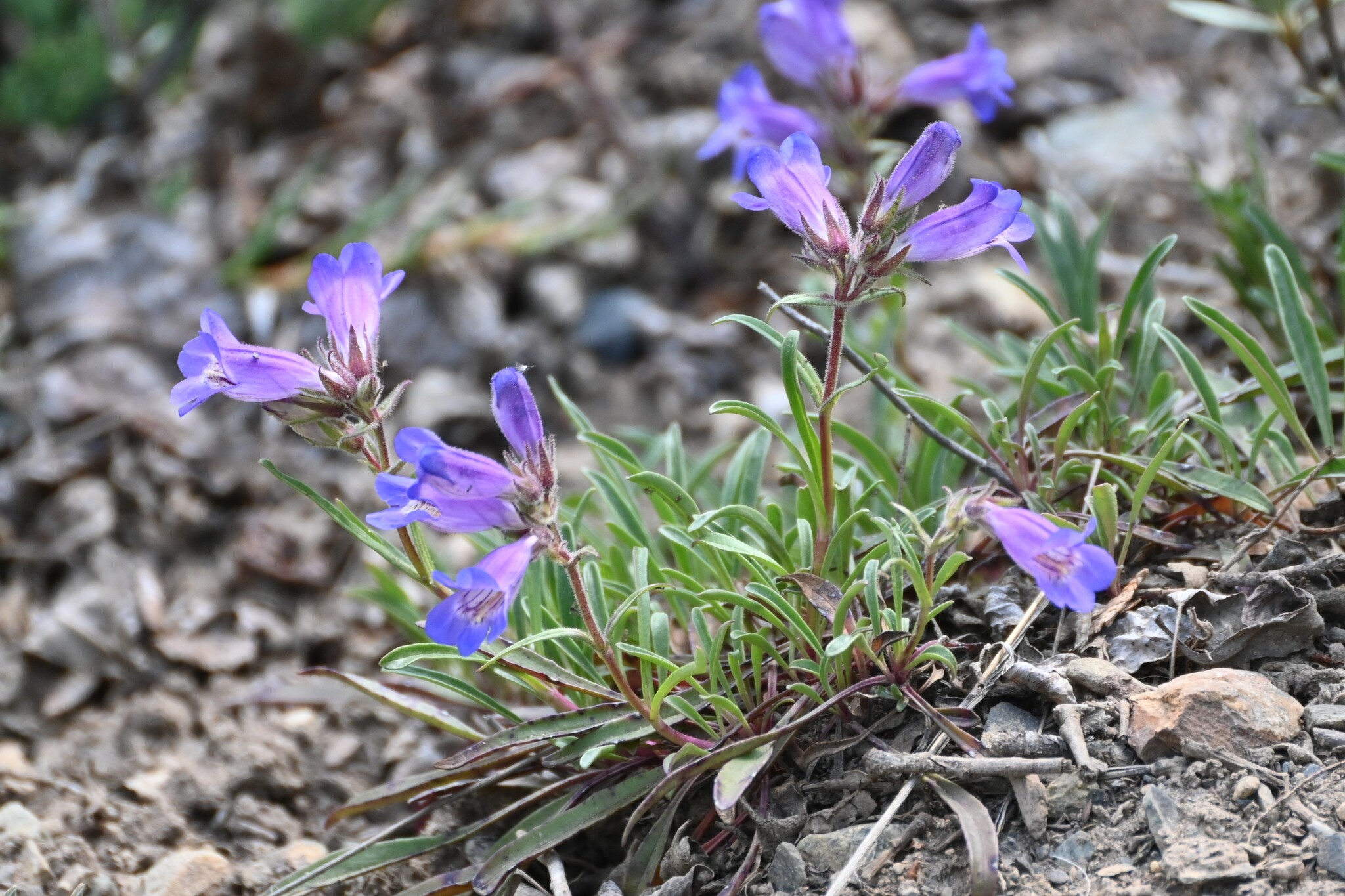
- North of Nares Lake, Yukon

Conservation status
- Apparently Secure (NatureServe)

Scientific classification
- Kingdom: Plantae
- Clade: Embryophytes
- Clade: Tracheophytes
- Clade: Spermatophytes
- Clade: Angiosperms
- Clade: Eudicots
- Clade: Asterids
- Order: Lamiales
- Family: Plantaginaceae
- Genus: Penstemon
- Species: P. gormanii

Binomial name
- Penstemon gormanii Greene

= Penstemon gormanii =

Plant species in the veronica family

Penstemon gormanii, the Yukon beardtongue, is a plant species in the veronica family that grows in the far northwestern parts of North America in Alaska, the Yukon, Northwest Territories, and the northern edge of British Columbia.

== Description ==
The Yukon beardtongue is herbaceous plant that grows flowering stems that can be 6 to 35 centimeters (2.5–14 in) tall, but are typically 10 to 30 cm (4–12 in). It relatively long-lived, for a penstemon. The stems grow upright to leaning outwards and then growing upwards and are hairless at the base and covered in glandular hairs or long glandular hairs towards the ends. Each plant can have one or more stems and grows from a single taproot that may branch.

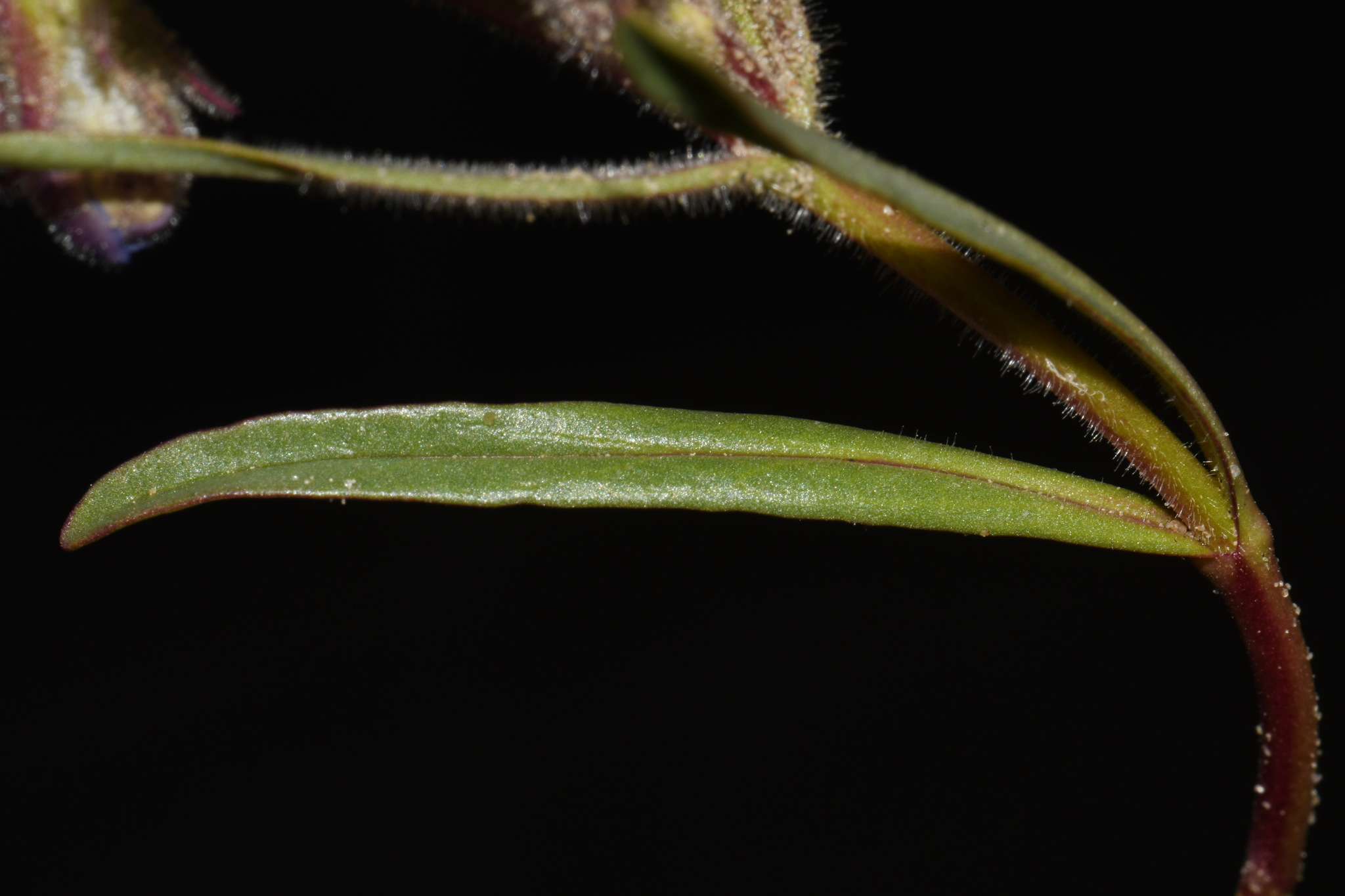
A leaf on a stem

Plants will have both basal leaves and ones attached to the stems that are not leathery in texture. Usually all the leaves are hairless, but sometimes the uppermost leaves on the stems are glandular-pubescent on the upper surface. The basal leaves and lowest ones on the stems measure 1.8–10 cm (0.5–4 in) long and just 0.2–1 cm wide and are attached by leaf stems. Flowering stems have two to four leaf pairs, the upper ones 1.5–6.8 cm (0.5–2.5 in) long and 0.2–1.6 cm wide. The leaf edges are smooth or very faintly toothed.

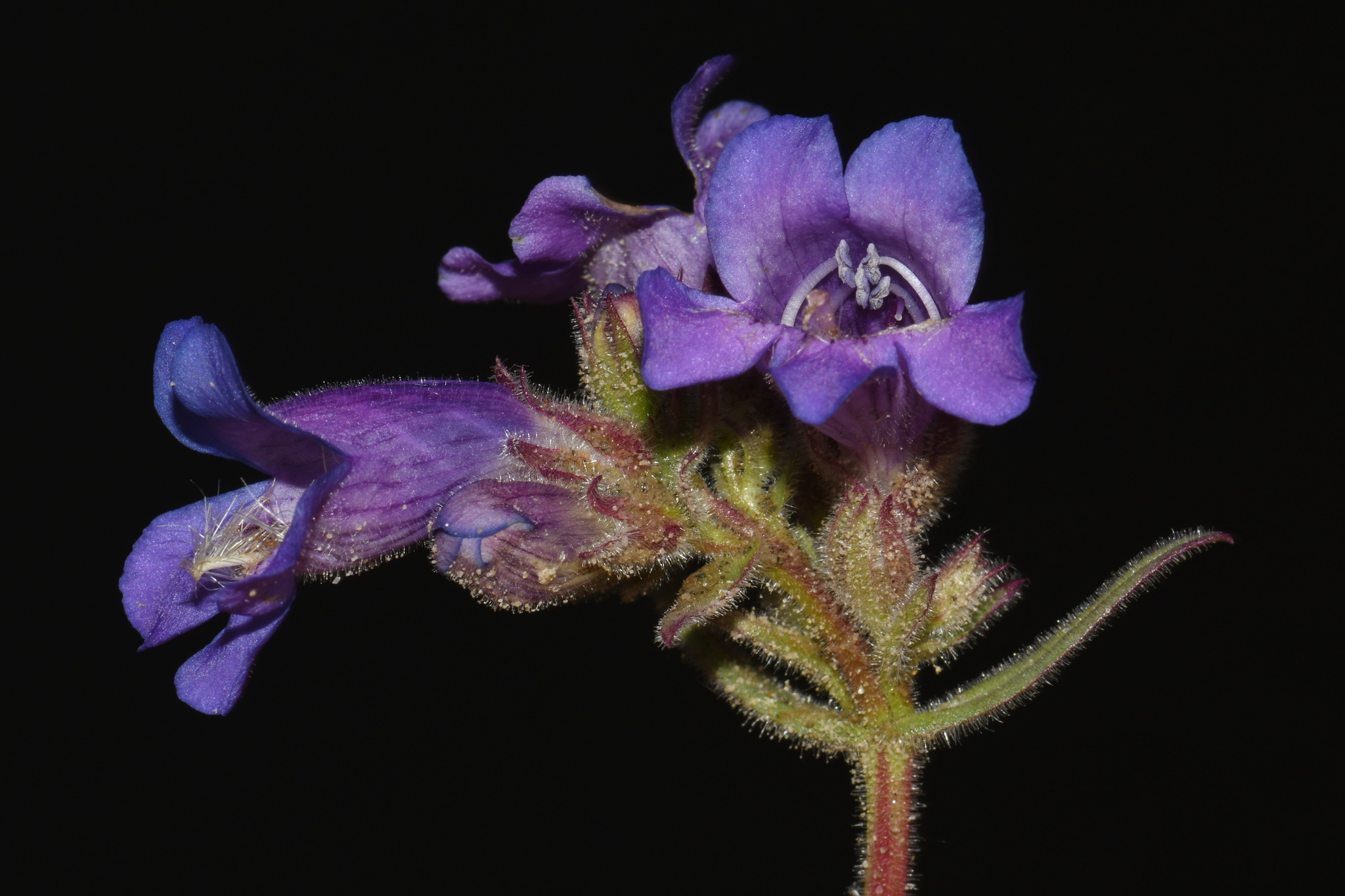
Flowers and buds

The flowers are violet to blue-violet, occasionally white or orchid-pink, with reddish-purple floral guide lines and white to pale yellow hairs inside the flower tube. The fused petals are 1.9–3 cm (0.7–1.2 in) long and expand rapidly in diameter, somewhat asymmetrically. The flowers are in two to six groups that can be widely spaced or close together, each group will have two attachment points with one to five flowers, though usually at least two. Flowering in its native habitat is as early as June or as late as August.

The fruit is a capsule 0.7–1 cm long and 0.4–0.5 cm wide.

== Taxonomy ==
Penstemon gormanii was scientifically described and named by Edward Lee Greene in 1902. It is classified in the Penstemon genus within the Plantaginaceae family and has no subspecies or botanical synonyms. Greene described it using specimens collected by Martin W. Gorman on 9 June 1899 on hills in the Yukon Valley, near Fort Selkirk.

=== Names ===
The species name, gormanii, references the collection of the type specimen by Gorman. It is known by the common name Yukon beardtongue.

== Range and habitat ==
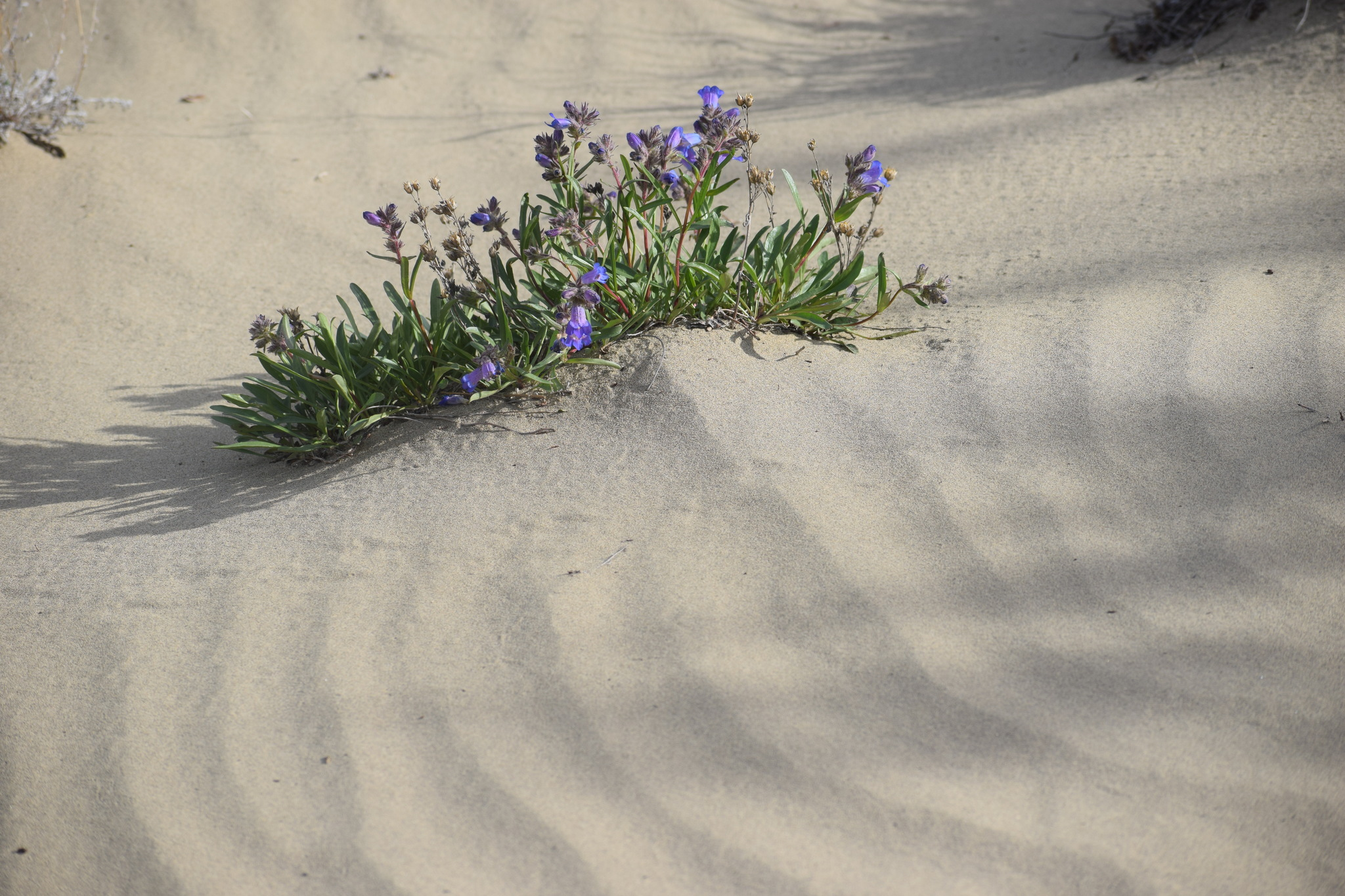
Blooming in a sandy area next to the Yukon River north of Whitehorse, Yukon

Yukon beardtongues are native to Alaska, British Columbia, Yukon Territory, and the Northwest Territories. In Alaska it grows in the west-central parts of the state, to latitudes of as much as 68°N. In the Yukon it is found in the southwest to as much as 65°N. It only reaches the eastern side of the Mackenzie Mountains in the Northwest Territories and the very northern interior of British Columbia. It grows in the Brooks Range, eastern parts of the Alaska Range, and the Saint Elias Mountains. The elevation range for the species is 400 to 1,200 meters (1,300–3,900 ft). Though the species reaches to or even slightly above the treeline at 1,300 meters (4,300 ft), it is much more abundant between about 800 and 900 m (2,600 and 3,000 ft) and declines and numbers at greater elevations.

Its can grow on sand dunes, rocky slopes, in forest clearings, gravelly banks near streams, river canyons, on bluffs, and in road cuts. Yukon beardtongues prefer somewhat drier habitats.

=== Conservation ===
When evaluated by NatureServe in 2016 it was rated apparently secure at the global level. It was also rated as apparently secure (S4) in the Yukon, but vulnerable (S3) in Alaska and British Columbia. It might be locally extinct in the Northwest Territories.

== Uses ==
The species is grown in gardens by penstemon enthusiasts in locations far from its native habitat such as Michigan and Europe.

== See also ==
List of Penstemon species
