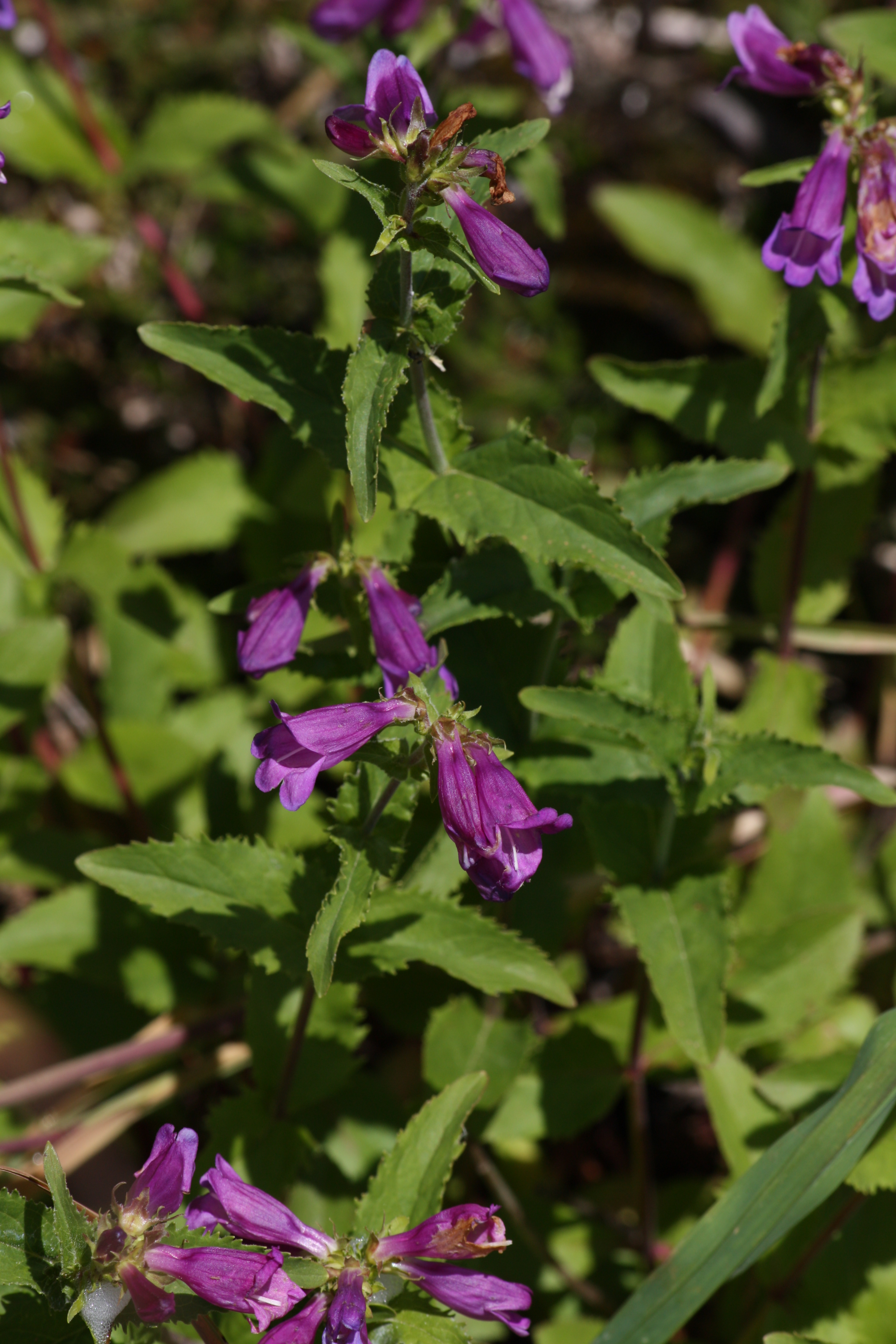

Conservation status
- Secure (NatureServe)

Scientific classification
- Kingdom: Plantae
- Clade: Tracheophytes
- Clade: Angiosperms
- Clade: Eudicots
- Clade: Asterids
- Order: Lamiales
- Family: Plantaginaceae
- Genus: Penstemon
- Species: P. serrulatus

Binomial name
- Penstemon serrulatus Menzies ex Sm.

= Penstemon serrulatus =

Species of flowering plant

Penstemon serrulatus is a species of penstemon known by the common names Cascade penstemon, coast penstemon, or serrulate penstemon. It is native to the Pacific Northwest of North America, from Oregon to Alaska.

== Description ==
Penstemon serrulatus has multiple herbaceous stems up to 70 centimetres (28 in) tall growing from a perennial woody base. The leaves are lanceolate to ovate-oblong with sharply serrated edges. The inflorescence consists of clusters of tubular blue to purple flowers.

Penstemon serrulatus is one of the few penstemons to occur at low elevations along the Pacific Northwest coast and in the Puget Sound lowlands.
