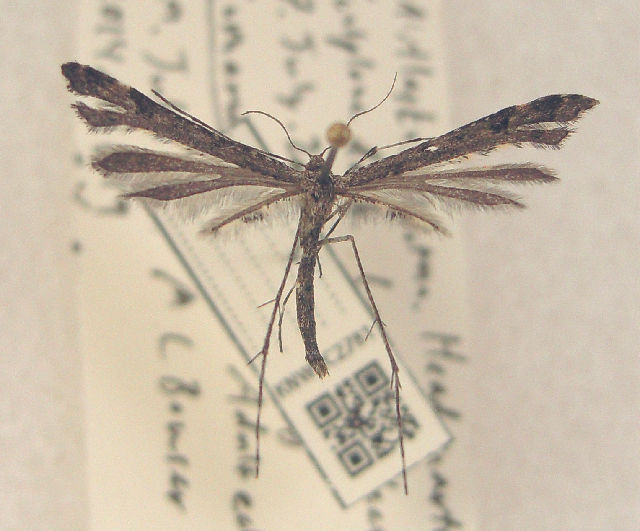

Scientific classification
- Domain: Eukaryota
- Kingdom: Animalia
- Phylum: Arthropoda
- Class: Insecta
- Order: Lepidoptera
- Family: Pterophoridae
- Genus: Amblyptilia
- Species: A. pica

Binomial name
- Amblyptilia pica (Walsingham, 1880)

Synonyms
- Amblyptilus pica Walsingham, 1880; Platyptilia pica; Platyptilia monticola Grinnell, 1908; Platyptilia crataea T. B. Fletcher, 1940; Platyptilia pica calisequoiae Lange, 1950; Platyptilia pica marina Lange, 1950; Platyptilia pica sierra Lange, 1950

= Amblyptilia pica =

Geranium plume moth

Species of plume moth

Amblyptilia pica, the geranium plume moth, is a moth of the family Pterophoridae. The species was first described by Baron Walsingham in 1880. It is found in western North America from Alaska to California, inland to Alberta and Kansas. It is also found in the north-eastern United States and Ontario.

The wingspan is 18–23 millimetres (0.71–0.91 in). Adults have dark grey forewings mottled with black. They are on wing in spring and fall and have been recorded feeding on the flower nectar of Salix species.

The larvae feed on Scrophulariaceae, Geraniaceae, Primulaceae, Labiatae and Caprifoliaceae species, including Castilleja species, Pedicularis furbishiae and Scrophularia californica, Penstemon whippleanus. and mine the leaves. The species overwinters as an adult.

== Taxonomy ==
A number of subspecies has been described, but it is unclear which, if any, are still valid:

- Amblyptilia pica pica
- Amblyptilia pica calisequoiae (Lange, 1950)
- Amblyptilia pica marina (Lange, 1950)
- Amblyptilia pica sierrae (Lange, 1950)
- Amblyptilia pica monticola (Grinnell, 1908)
- Amblyptilia pica crataea (T. B. Fletcher, 1940)
