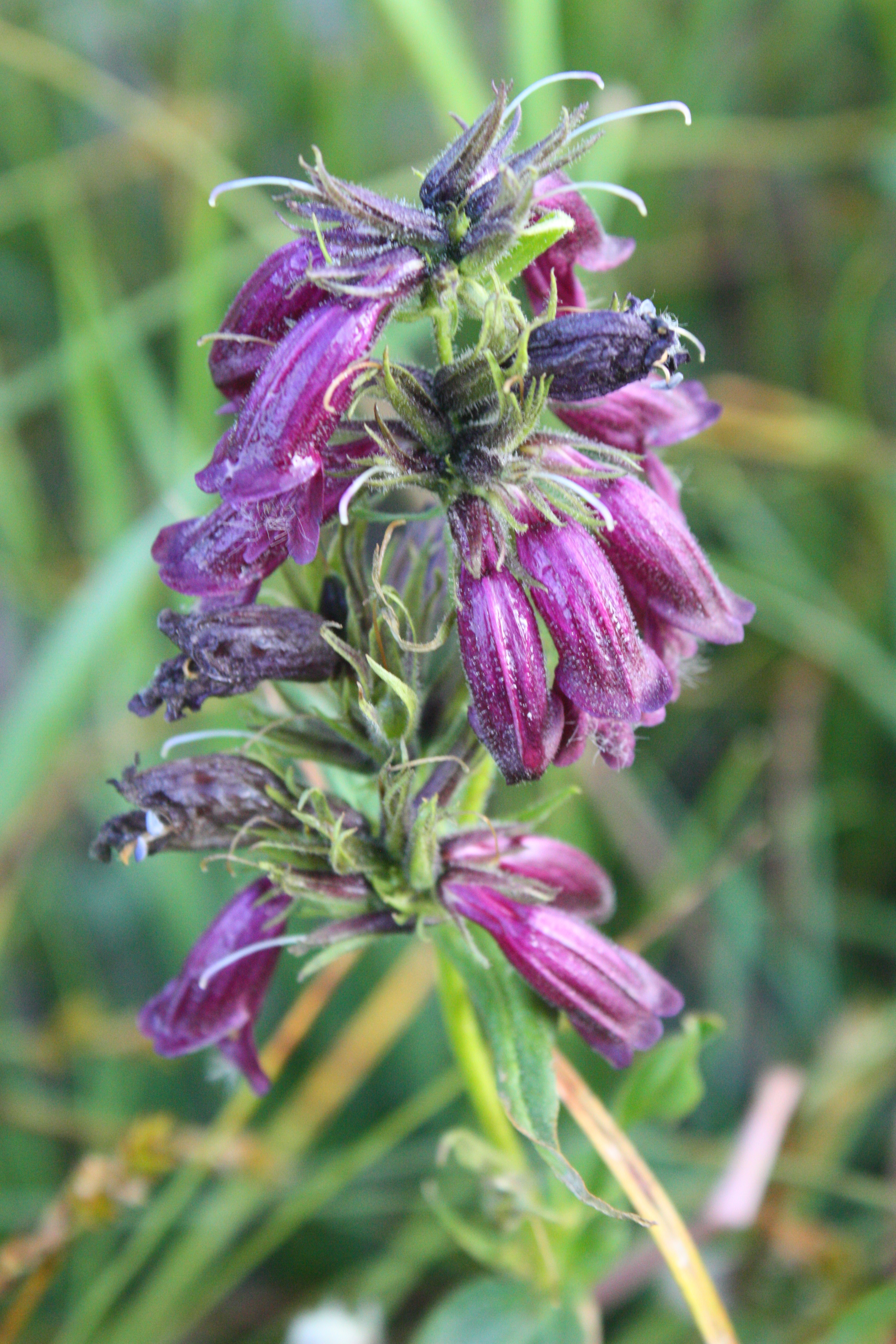
- Inflorescence with many dark flowers

Conservation status
- Secure (NatureServe)

Scientific classification
- Kingdom: Plantae
- Clade: Tracheophytes
- Clade: Angiosperms
- Clade: Eudicots
- Clade: Asterids
- Order: Lamiales
- Family: Plantaginaceae
- Genus: Penstemon
- Species: P. whippleanus

Binomial name
- Penstemon whippleanus A.Gray

Synonyms
- Penstemon arizonicus; Penstemon pallescens; Penstemon stenosepalus

= Penstemon whippleanus =

Plant species in the veronica family

Penstemon whippleanus, commonly known as dusky penstemon or Whipple's penstemon, is a summer blooming perennial flower in the large Penstemon genus. It is a widespread plant within the hemiboreal forests of the Rocky Mountains in North America. It is noted for the large deep purple-red flowers and a preference for high mountain elevations.

== Description ==
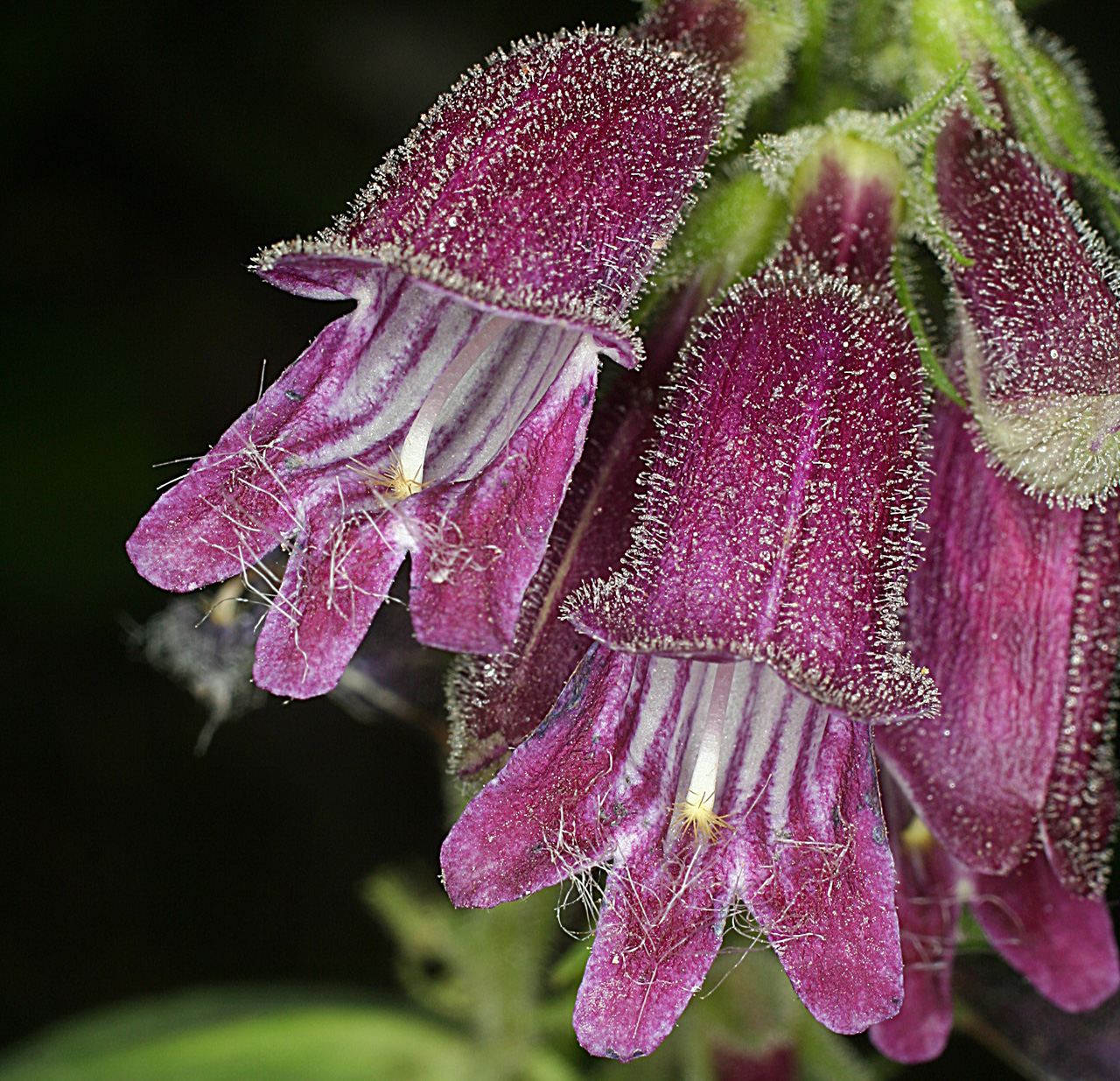
Detail of P. whippleanus in bloom showing highly glandular petals

Dusky penstemon is easily recognizable because it is the only species with its combination of large flower size, striking dark or pale flower, and the height of its flowering stems. They are usually 20 to 65 centimeters (8–26 in) tall, but on occasion may be as short as 8 cm (3 in) or as tall as 1 meter (39 in).

Like most members of its genus, Penstemon whippleanus is an evergreen perennial plant. They have both basal leaves, leaves attached to the base of the plant, and in pairs on opposite sides of their flowering stems. The basal leaves grow on short stems, are smooth without hairs, but not leathery. Each basal leaf is about 40–90 mm long and 10–30 mm wide with a generally blade ovate to lanceolate shape. The leaves on the flowering stems are generally narrower and shorter, 25–60 mm in length and 3–15 mm, with a blade lanceolate to oblanceolate shape.

The flowering stem are tall and generally straight with multiple flowers clustered at nodes just above each pair of leaves. The flowering stem grow indeterminately and are smooth (glabrous) below and glandular and hairy above. Each flower cluster has two groupings (a cyme) with 2-4 flowers, 4-8 in total. The bracts near attachment point are lanceolate.

The flowers are large, usually 20–27 mm in length and occasionally up to 30 mm in length with a width of 8–10 mm at the mouth. The flowers are most often a gothic black purple, but also can be violet, blue, and creamy white. The white form of the flower is mostly found in the mountains in the Great Basin and on Colorado's Grand Mesa and does not have an intermediate form with darker specimens. The flowers have fine lines inside the mouth of the flower that serve as nectar guides, white or lavender colored in dark forms of the flower and purple in light colored forms. The lower lip of the flower tube also has noticeable long white hairs.

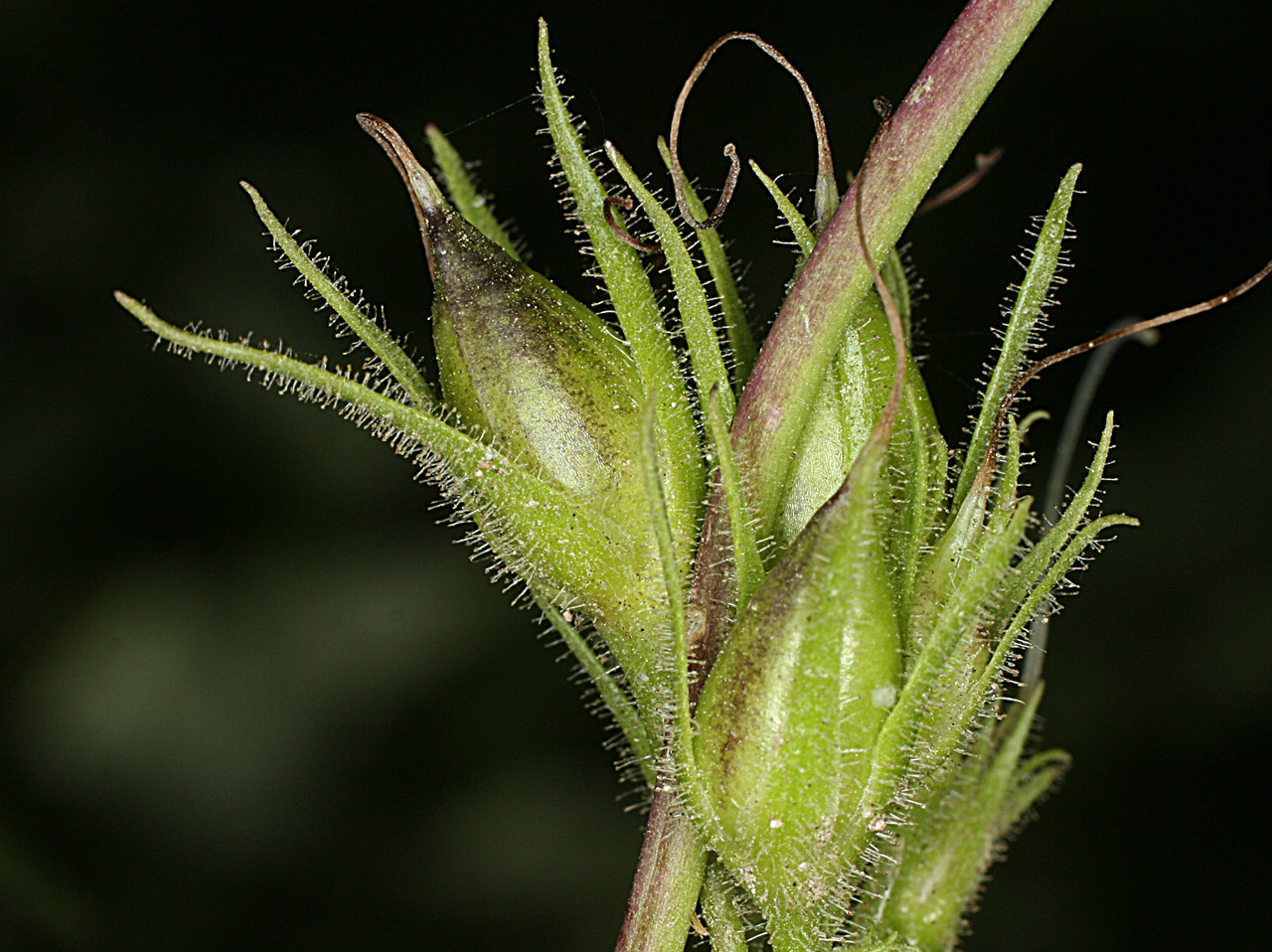
Penstemon whippleanus seed capsules

The seed capsules are rounded with four lobes and stretching upwards to a sharp tip at the top of each lobe. Split open each capsule holds numerous seeds. The seeds require a 6 to 12 week cold stratification for good germination.

== Taxonomy ==
Penstemon whippleanus was named and described by the famous American botanist Asa Gray in Proceedings of the American Academy of Arts and Sciences in 1862. He described it from a specimen collected by Dr. John Milton Bigelow made in October 1853 in the Sandia Mountains of New Mexico. In the same issue he inadvertently described another specimen of P. whippleanus collected in Colorado by Charles Christopher Parry as Penstemon glaucus var. stenosepalus. In 1899 another collection was incorrectly described as a new species, Penstemon arizonicus, by Amos Arthur Heller in the Bulletin of the Torrey Botanical Club. American botanist Thomas J. Howell reclassified Asa Gray's variety of P. glaucus as Penstemon stenosepalus in his book A Flora of northwest America in 1901. Another specimen from Rabbit Ears Pass Colorado was described as Penstemon pallescens by George E. Osterhout in 1930.

In 1920 Francis W. Pennell reevaluated Asa Gray's identification of the specimen collected near the headwaters of Clear Creek as P. glaucus var. stenosephalus and Howell's description of it as P. stenosephalus and instead identified it as P. whippleanus despite the color variations across its range. The respected Penstemon expert David D. Keck agreed with this in his article "Studies in Penstemon VIII" published in 1945 and additionally reevaluated the identification of P. arizonicus and P. pallescens as species, establishing their currently accepted status as synonyms for P. whippleanus.

Table of Synonyms
Name	Year	Rank
Penstemon arizonicus A.Heller	1899	species
Penstemon glaucus var. stenosepalus A.Gray	1862	variety
Penstemon pallescens Osterh.	1930	species
Penstemon stenosepalus (A.Gray) Howell	1901	species

=== Names ===
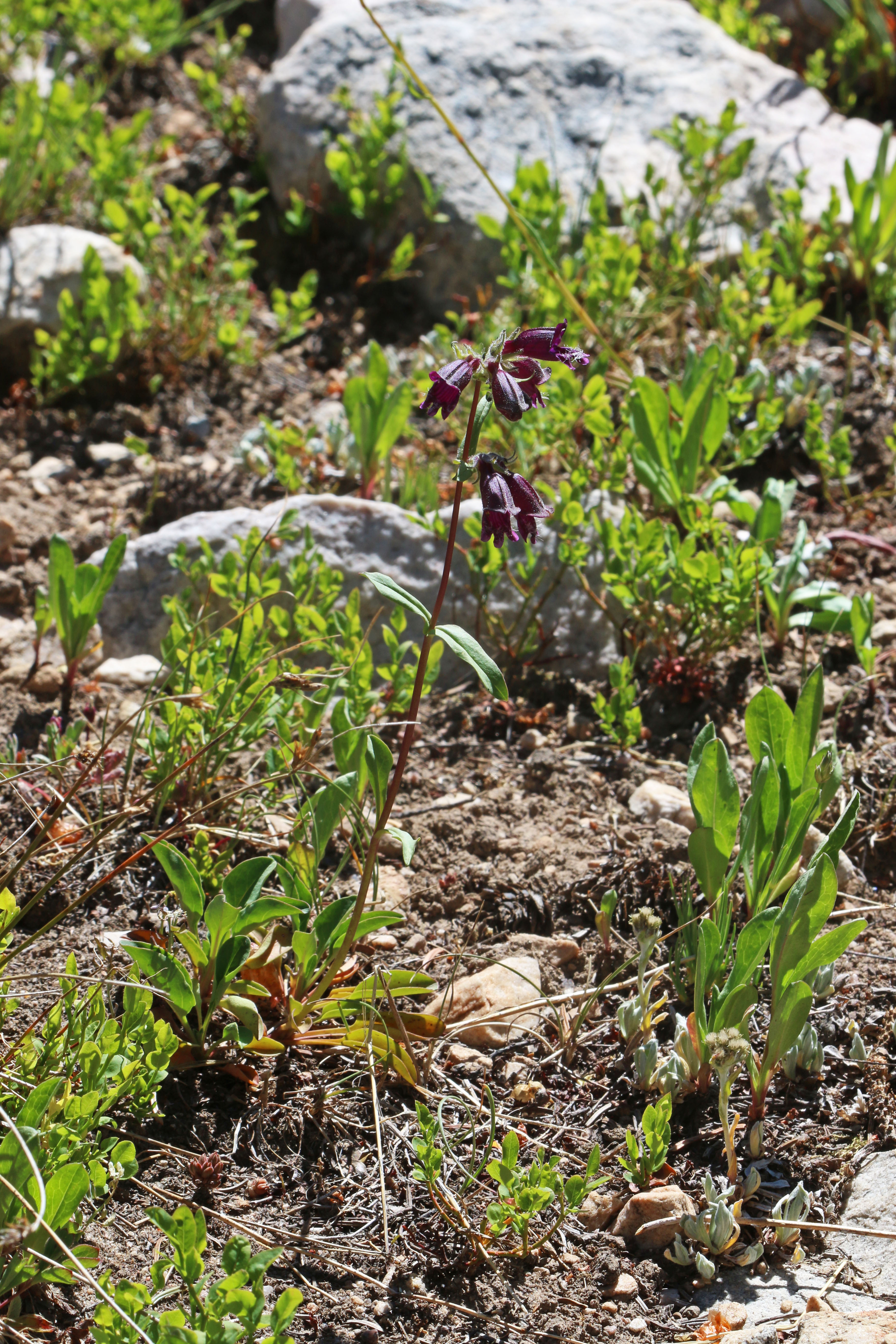
Near the Lofty Lake, High Uinta, Utah

Asa Gray named Penstemon whippleanus in honor of the leader of one of the two southern Pacific Railroad Surveys, Lt. Amiel Weeks Whipple. It is known by the related common names dusky penstemon and dusky beardtongue. From its scientific namesake it is also called Whipple's penstemon, Whipple's beardtongue, and rarely Whipplean penstemon.

== Range and habitat ==
Penstemon whippleanus is widely distributed in the central Rocky Mountains of North America. It is recorded by the USDA Natural Resources Conservation Service PLANTS database (PLANTS) as growing in New Mexico, Arizona, Colorado, Utah, Wyoming, Idaho, and Montana. However, there are no county level distributions for Montana recorded in the PLANTS database.

Penstemon whippleanus grows primarily in the subalpine or subarctic biome from 2500–3600 meters with occasional populations above timberline or in foothills as low as 1825 meters. The plants are generally found on open slopes, meadows, rocky ledges, mountain tundra, and openings in woodlands. They will also readily colonize the gravelly edges of roads and highways; the plants have a noted preference for rocky soils.

=== Conservation ===
The global status of the dusky penstemon was last reviewed by NatureServe in 1984. At that time they evaluated it as secure (G5). At the state level they only evaluated it in Wyoming, where they thought it was apparently secure (S4) and in Montana, rated as imperiled (S3).

== Ecology ==
Alongside other mountain species such as rosy paintbrush (Castilleja rhexiifolia) and scarlet paintbrush (Castilleja miniata), the dusky penstemon is a host for the geranium plume moth (Amblyptilia pica). The geranium plum moth caterpillars, when presented with both leaves and flowers of the dusky penstemon, chose only the flowers. The flowers contain significant amounts of boschniakine, an alkaloid whereas the leaves only contain trace amounts. The flowers also contain a pyridine named pedicularine and 4-noractinidine. The 1983 detection of alkaloids in the species as the first in a penstemon, the iridoids being much better known until then.

== Cultivation ==
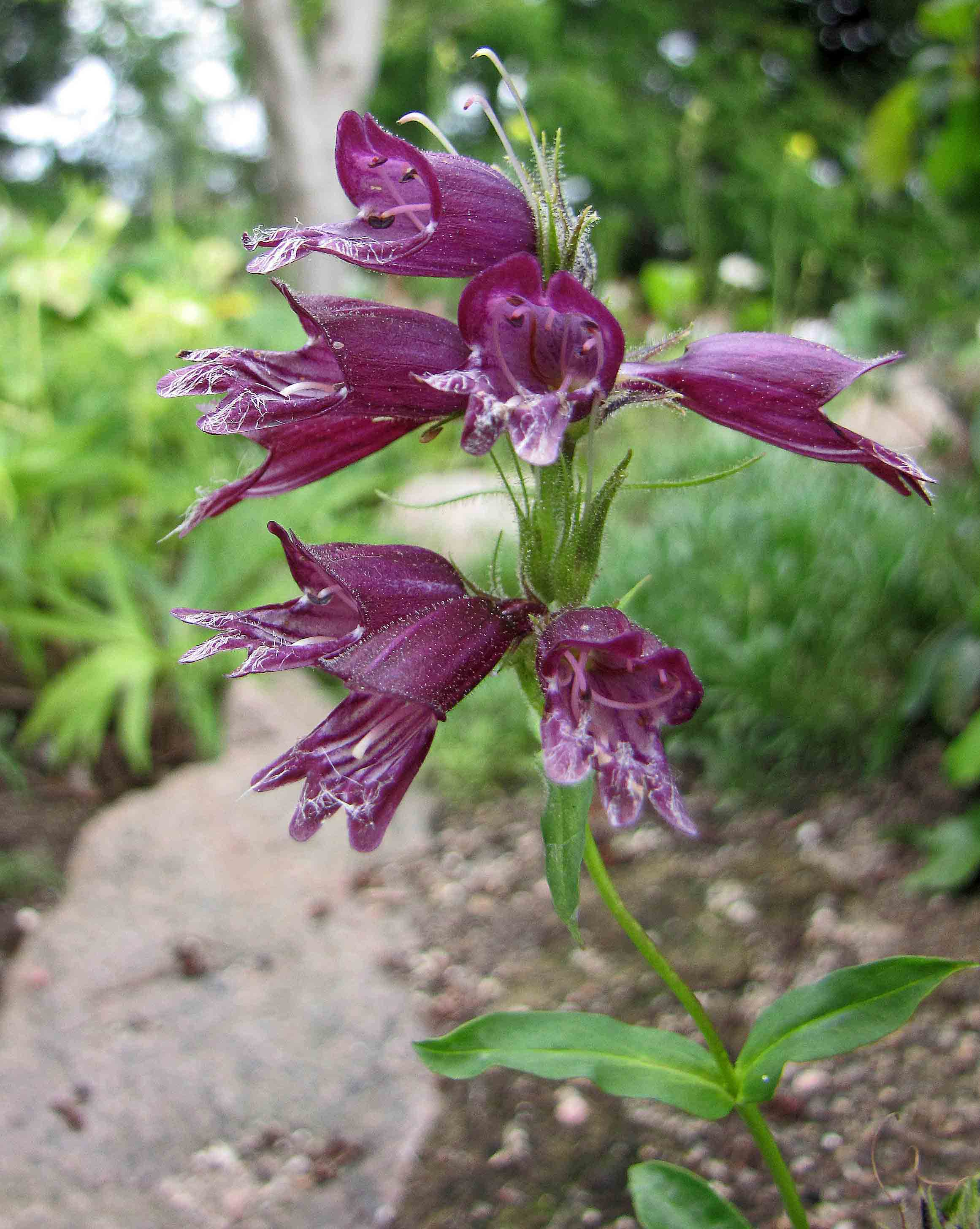
Copenhagen University Botanical Garden

Dusky penstemons are planted in gardens as an ornamental plant for their large and striking flowers that appear in summer at high elevations or as early as April in low elevations. It is very winter hardy, recorded as surviving in USDA zones 4-8 and a UK hardiness of H4. In garden conditions they grow in neutral to acid soils and spread rapidly; they are also tolerant of propagation by division.

In the garden they are, like most members of the genus, drought tolerant but intolerant of poorly draining soils or waterlogged conditions. They are more tolerant of moisture than most of the genus. They are not demanding of rich soils or fertilization, but do produce more flowers in richer soils. Because of its native habitat P. whippleanus is particularly suited to higher elevation gardens.

Dusky penstemon grows in full sun and partial shade, but are healthier in warmer climates with afternoon shade. They are resistant to browsing by deer, but young plants in garden settings are often damaged by eleworms, slugs, or snails. They are also vulnerable in garden settings to powdery mildew, rust, leaf spots, and Southern blight. Their seeds require cold and moist stratification of three months for good germination rates or to be planted outside over the winter with a similar period of cold conditions.

== See also ==
- List of Penstemon species

== Gallery ==
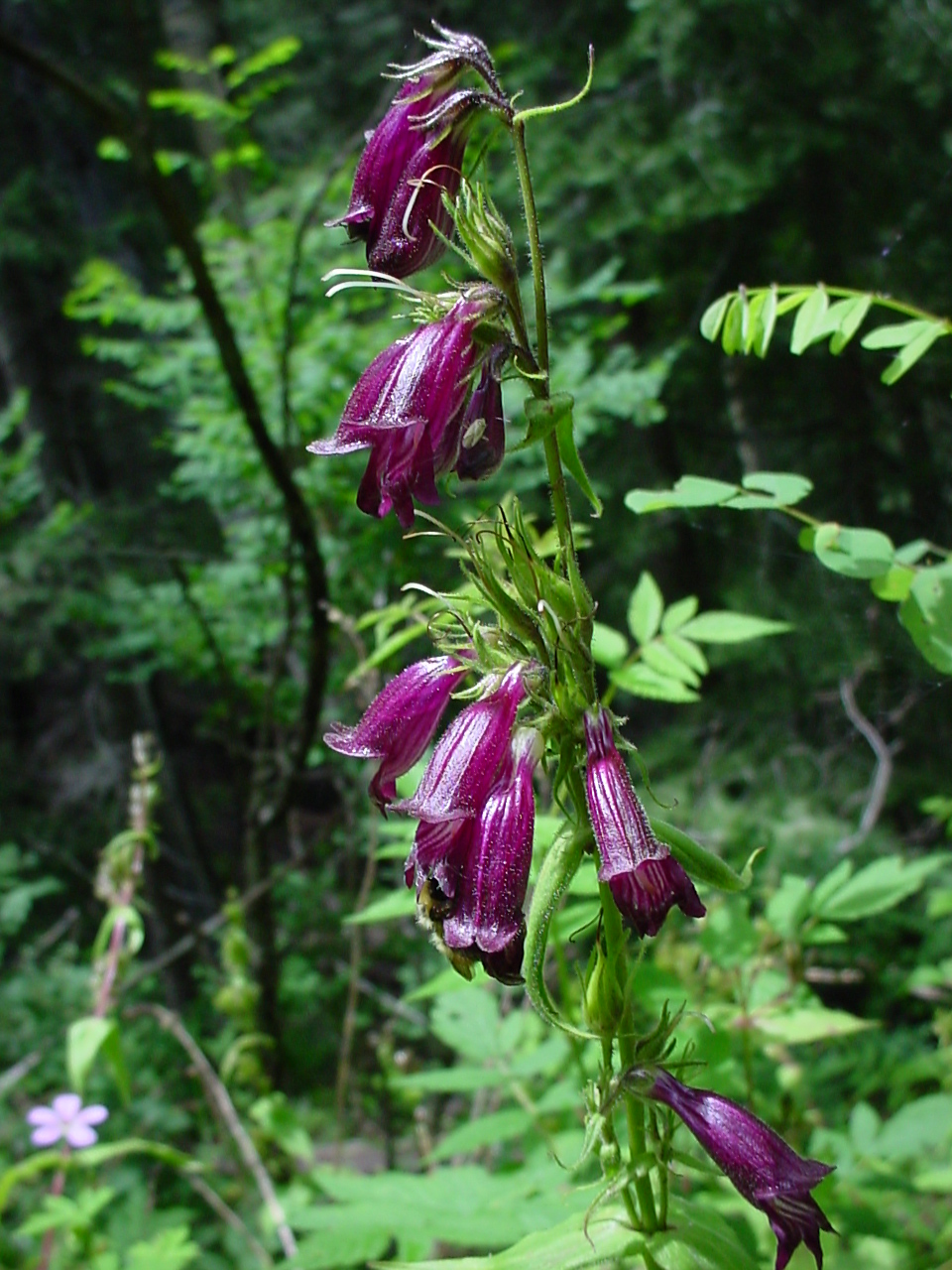
Penstemon whippleanus Mogollon Mtns., Bursum Road, Aug. 5, 2007. photo courtesy Dale A. Zimmerman Herbarium
