= HMS Pentstemon =

Two ships of the Royal Navy have borne the name Pentstemon (or Penstemon) after the flower:

- HMS Pentstemon (1916), an Arabis-class sloop launched in 1916 she was sold in 1920 into mercantile service as Lila. Subsequently, became the Chinese gunboat "Hai Chow" and sunk in 1937.
- HMS Pentstemon (K61), a Flower-class corvette launched in 1941 and sold in 1946 into mercantile service as Galaxidi.
