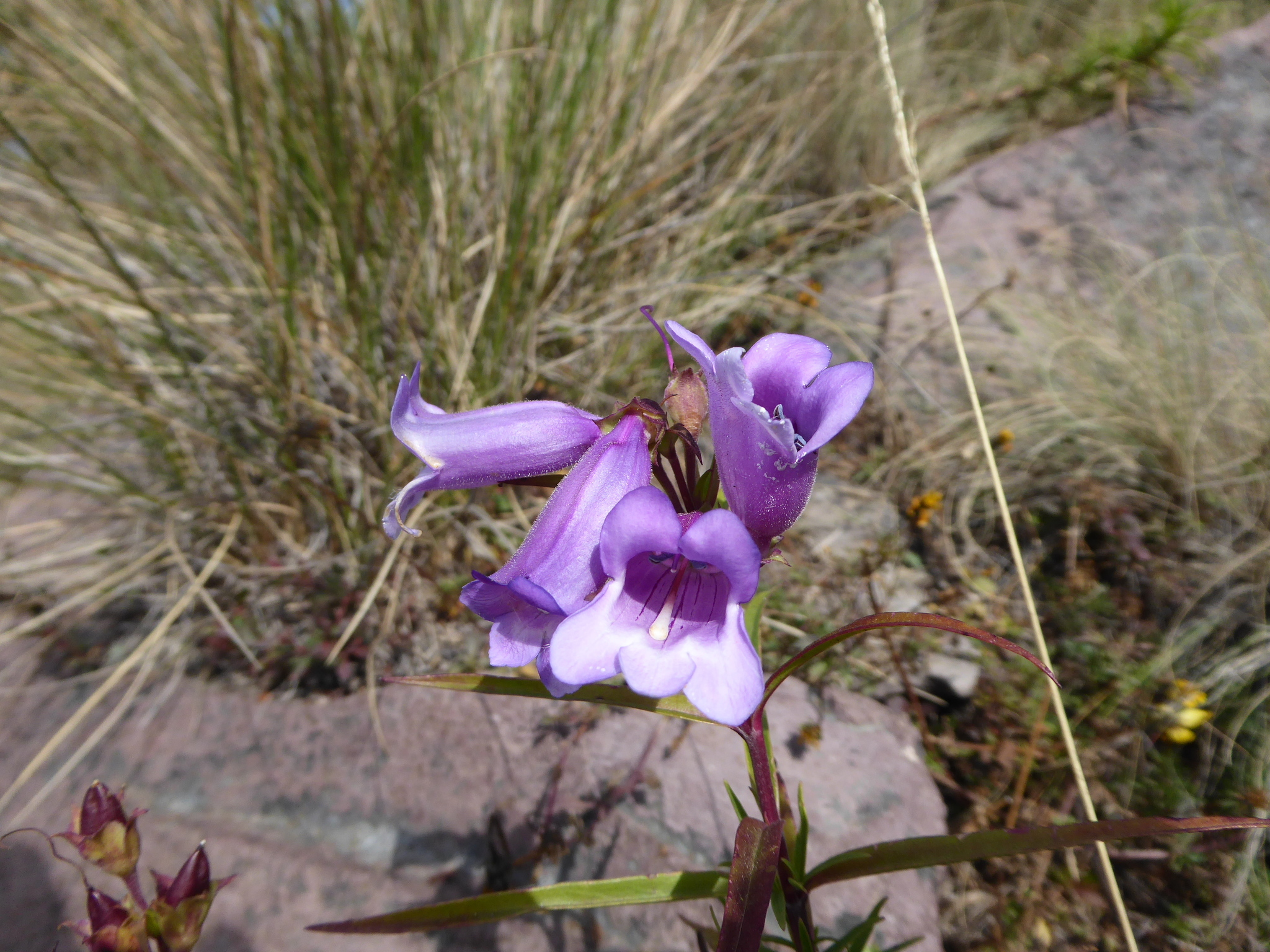

Scientific classification
- Kingdom: Plantae
- Clade: Embryophytes
- Clade: Tracheophytes
- Clade: Angiosperms
- Clade: Eudicots
- Clade: Asterids
- Order: Lamiales
- Family: Plantaginaceae
- Genus: Penstemon
- Species: P. gentianoides

Binomial name
- Penstemon gentianoides (Kunth) Poir.

Synonyms
- Chelone gentianoides Kunth; Penstemon skutchii Straw

= Penstemon gentianoides =

Species of flowering plant

Penstemon gentianoides, the gentian beardtongue or gentian-leaved penstemon, is a species of flowering plant in the plantain family Plantaginaceae. Found on volcanic mountain slopes across Mexico and Central America, especially in Mexican mountain pine forests, it is a somewhat shrubby perennial herb that can grow up to 1.5 meters tall in good conditions. It has dense bundles of leaves and thyrse-shaped flower clusters with 3–6 flowers which are blue-violet. Named for its similarity to gentians, the species was first described in 1817. It was moved from its original genus Chelone to Penstemon in 1825, and was designated the type species of the new section Fasciculus in 1962.

P. gentianoides is pollinated by several species of hummingbirds and bumblebees, but can also self-pollinate. The species is used in folk medicine as an anti-inflammatory and for various other purposes, and some of these properties have been demonstrated in a laboratory setting. A phytochemical study was able to isolate a new iridoid chemical from the plant's extract, which was named pensteminoside.

== Description ==
Penstemon gentianoides is a perennial herb that grows upright. It is suffrutescent, or somewhat shrubby, with many stems from a woody base. In good conditions, the plant can become 1.5 meters tall, but in harsher conditions only grows to 0.5 meters tall. It has a chromosome number of n=8 and 2n=16.

=== Vegetative structures ===
The stems of the plant are straight and lack hairs (glabrous) everywhere except for the top, where they have very thin hairs. They have dense bundles, or fascicles, of many leaves. The leaves are arranged on opposite sides of the stems and lack a leaf stalk. They have a somewhat leathery texture and usually lack hairs, but can rarely have some hairs. Leaves on the upper part of the plant are lance-shaped and wide, while lower leaves are more narrow and tapering. The largest leaves are 7–15 centimeters long and 1–3 cm wide, and all leaves have smooth edges.

=== Flowering structures ===
The plant's flower cluster (inflorescence) is a thyrse, which has a long main axis and many shorter sub-axes. Each cluster has at least 3–6 flowers. The bract leaves are lance-shaped and conspicuous, with the lower ones being longer than the flowers. The pedicels have hairs and glands, and the peduncles are short. The sepals are ellipse-shaped or oval-shaped, or sometimes rhombus-shaped. They are 0.9–1.1 cm long and 0.4–0.5 cm wide, and either lack hairs or have them just along the edges.

The flowers are blue-violet and have a corolla tube that is roughly the same length of the calyx, about 3 cm. Towards the end, it widens abruptly but has a broad and flat lower lip. The stamens are didynamous, or are present in two pairs of uneven stamens. They have hairy, white filaments, and the anthers have strong inner ridges, but there is also a long, sterile filament that lacks hairs. The ovaries are oval-shaped and taper to a point, with a threadlike style that bends down when the plant is mature. The ovules are anatropous and have a single integument. The seed capsule splits when mature, revealing black seeds that are less than 0.2 cm long.

=== Chemistry ===
In 2007, the first phytochemical study on Penstemon gentianoides was undertaken. Using ethyl acetate extracts from the leaves, researchers were able to identify a new iridoid chemical they named pensteminoside. Iridoids like this may help flowering plants deter herbivory. Other compounds found in the leaves include plantarenaloside, globularisicin, luteolin, diosmetin, verbascoside, and martynoside.

== Etymology ==
The genus name Penstemon was given by American geographer and botanist John Mitchell based on its characteristic large sterile stamen. It comes from a combination of the Latin word pen ("almost") and the Greek word stemon ("stamen"). The specific epithet gentianoides means "gentian-like" or "similar to a gentian". Penstemon gentianoides is commonly known as gentian beardtongue or the gentian-leaved penstemon.

== Taxonomy ==
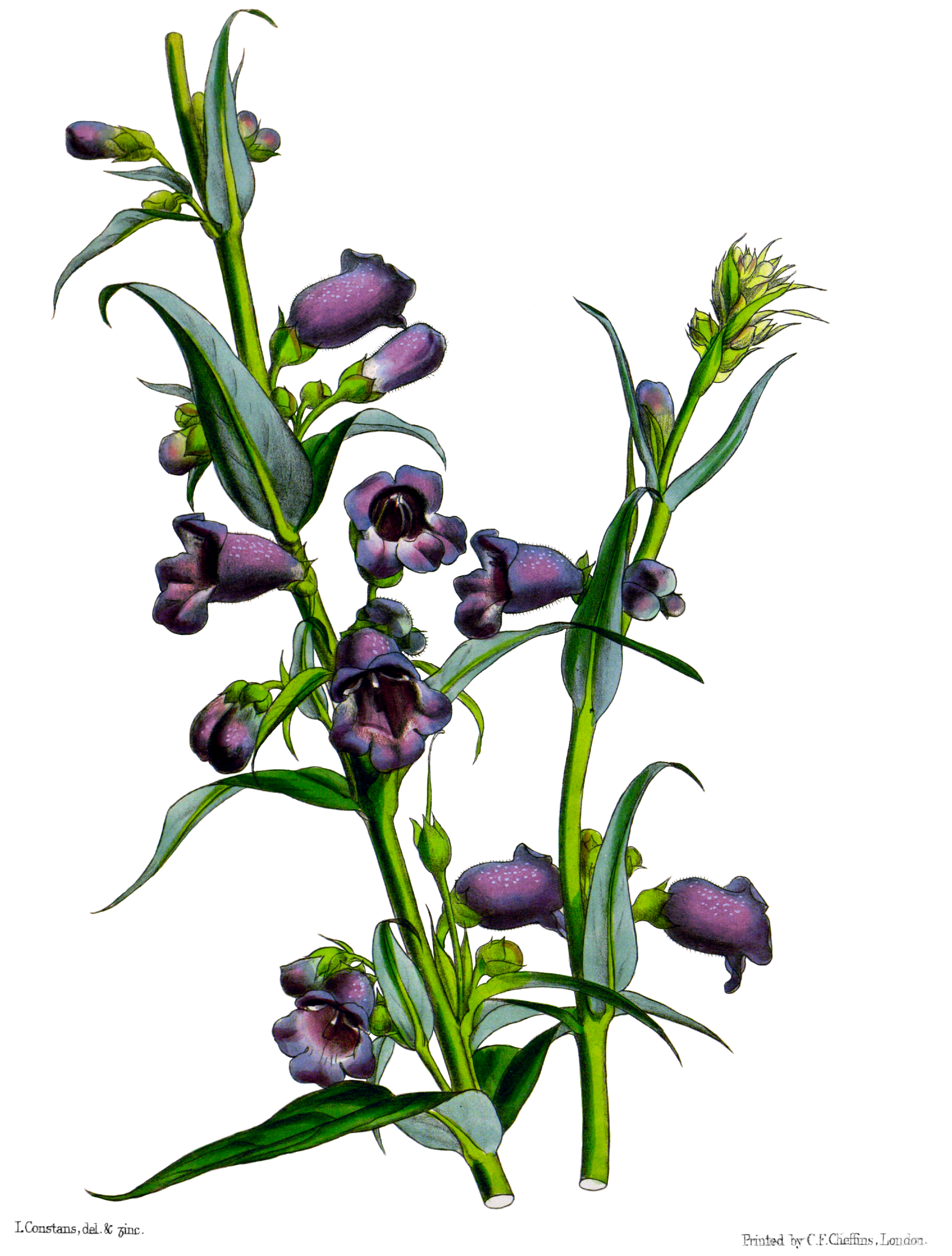
An 1853 illustration of P. gentianoides from Paxton's Flower Garden

German botanist Carl Sigismund Kunth was the first to describe the species, naming it Chelone gentianoides in an edition of Nova Genera et Species Plantarum in 1817. The modern name Penstemon gentianoides was first applied to the species in the Dictionnaire des sciences naturelles in 1825 by French botanist Jean Louis Marie Poiret, who moved the plant into the genus Penstemon. Penstemon verticallum was described in 1845 and P. skutchii in 1962, but both were later determined to be synonymous with P. gentianoides.

Botanist Richard Myron Straw established sections and subsections for the genus Penstemon in 1962. He designated P. gentianoides as the type species of both subsection Fasciculi and section Fasciculus.

== Distribution and habitat ==
In Kunth's original publication on the species, the habitat was described as cold places on the slope of the volcano Nevado de Toluca in central Mexico. Poiret designated a location near Tolú in Colombia as the type locality of Penstemon gentianoides. According to Plants of the World Online, its distribution encompasses Guatemala, Honduras, and all but the northwest of Mexico. In particular, the species is found on volcanic peaks of the Trans-Mexican Volcanic Belt at elevations of 3,000–4,200 meters.

== Ecology and reproduction ==
Penstemon gentianoides is found in the herbaceous layer of Mexican mountain pine (Pinus hartwegii) forests alongside Senecio platanifolius and Muhlenbergia macroura.

While Penstemon gentianoides is self-compatible and can be pollinated from different flowers on the same plant, cross-pollination leads to the production of more seeds and fruits. Its flowers are protandrous and have a staminate male flowering phase that lasts around eight days, and them a pistillate female phase that lasts anywhere from one to seven days. The species is pollinated by and is a food source for hummingbirds (including the broad-tailed hummingbird) and bumblebees including Bombus ephippiatus and Bombus huntii. Its flowers have a primarily hymenopteran pollination syndrome and primarily attempt to attract those insects. This is due to their blue-violet color, vestibular corolla, and lower flower lip. However, hummingbirds still play an important role in the reproduction of the species. They visit the flower at higher rates early in the morning, when the nectar is dilute but plentiful.

== Uses ==
Penstemon gentianoides has been used as an ethnomedicine in Mexico. An infusion of the roots and leaves is used for anti-inflammatory purposes. A 2011 study demonstrated that certain monoterpene extracts from the roots of the plant did possess anti-inflammatory properties in a laboratory setting on a similar level to the common drug indomethacin. Other folk medicine applications for the plant include using it as an emollient, balsamic, laxative, and anti-rheumatic.

While some authors believed that P. gentianoides was cultivated in Europe based on illustrations from several botanical magazines, the cultivated specimens were actually Penstemon hartwegii.

== See also ==
- List of Penstemon species
