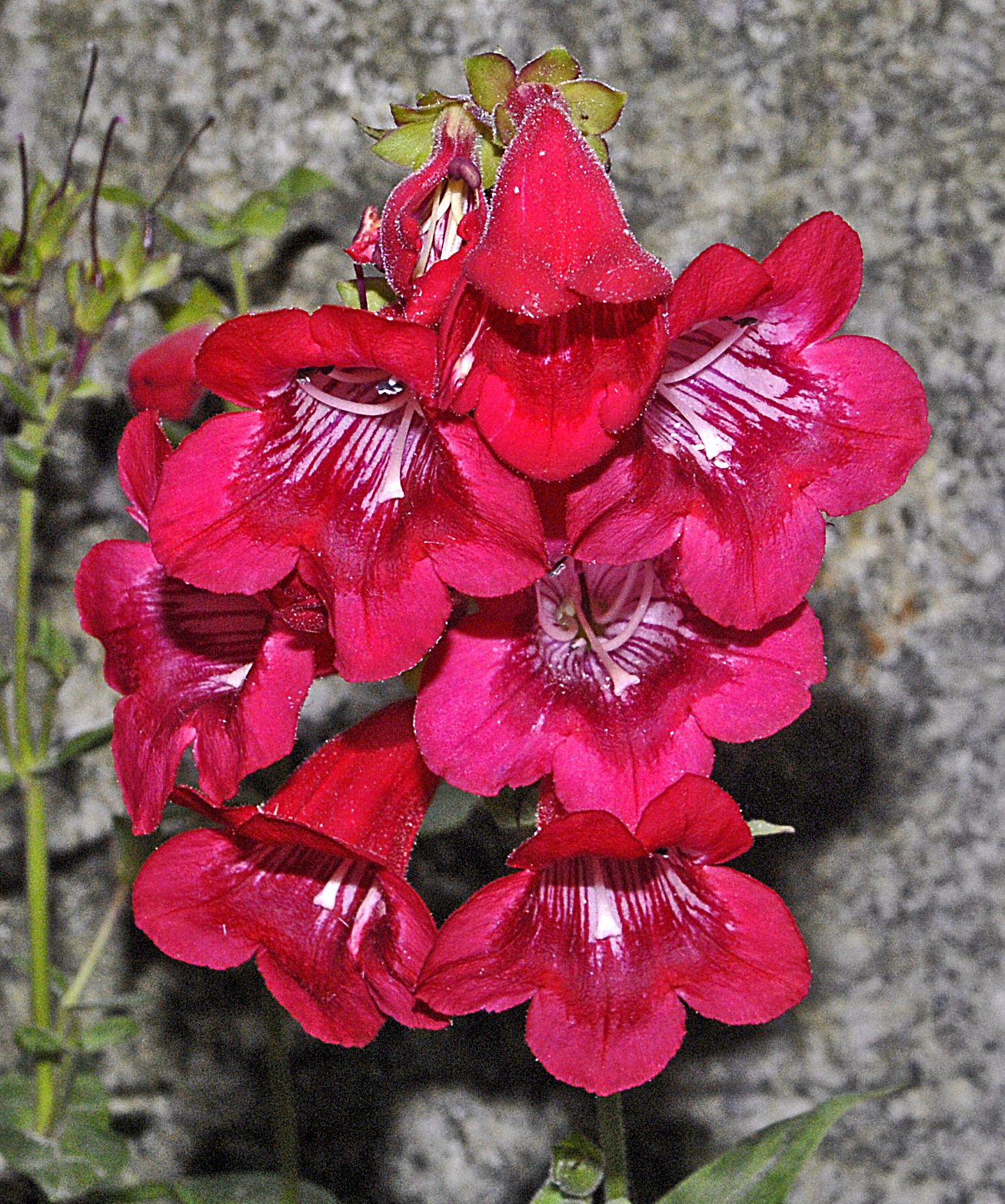
- Flowers of Penstemon hartwegii

Scientific classification
- Kingdom: Plantae
- Clade: Tracheophytes
- Clade: Angiosperms
- Clade: Eudicots
- Clade: Asterids
- Order: Lamiales
- Family: Plantaginaceae
- Genus: Penstemon
- Species: P. hartwegii

Binomial name
- Penstemon hartwegii Benth.

= Penstemon hartwegii =

Species of flowering plant

Penstemon hartwegii, common name Hartweg's beardtongue, is a species of flowering perennial herb in the plantain family.

== Description ==
Penstemon hartwegii can reach a height of 30–70 centimetres (12–28 in). This bushy semi-evergreen plant has simple, narrow, fleshy, mid-green leaves and racemes of bell-shaped bright-red, purple or crimson flowers, up to 4 cm long, with white markings on a wide throat. They bloom in summer and early autumn.

It has gained the Royal Horticultural Society's Award of Garden Merit.

== Taxonomy ==
Penstemon hartwegii was scientifically described and named by George Bentham in 1840. It is part of the genus Penstemon which is classified in the Plantaginaceae family. It has no accepted varieties, but has one variety name among its four heterotypic synonyms. It had previously been described by the botanist John Lindley in 1838, but he used the name Penstemon gentianoides for the species which had been previously used for another species.

Table of Synonyms
Name	Year	Rank	Notes
Penstemon gentianoides Lindl.	1838	species	nom. illeg., homonym
Penstemon giganteus C.Morren	1846	species	
Penstemon hartwegii var. hybridus Voss	1894	variety	
Penstemon puniceus Lilja	1843	species	

== Distribution ==
This species is native to Mexico.
