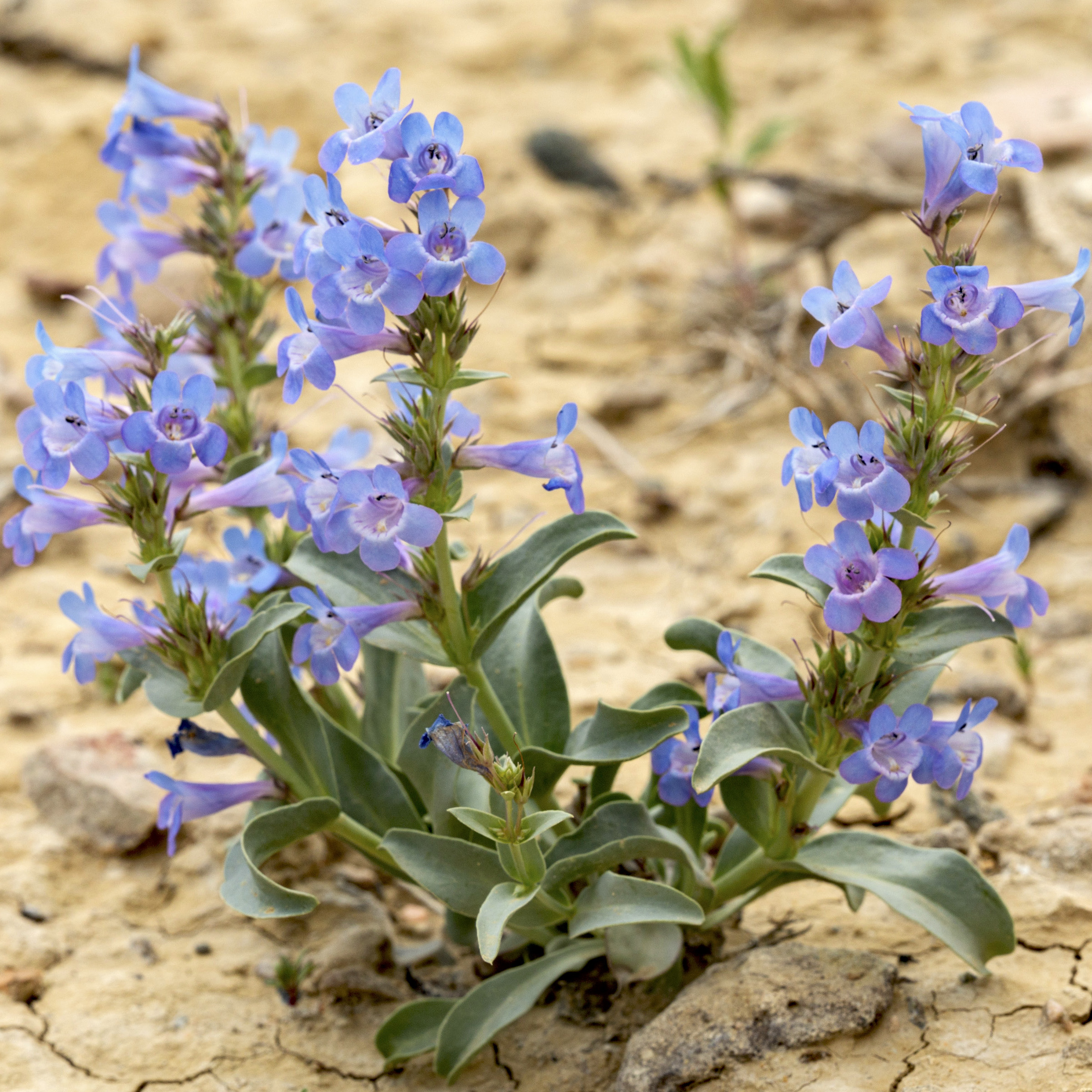
- Penstemon nitidus

Scientific classification
- Kingdom: Plantae
- Clade: Embryophytes
- Clade: Tracheophytes
- Clade: Spermatophytes
- Clade: Angiosperms
- Clade: Eudicots
- Clade: Asterids
- Order: Lamiales
- Family: Plantaginaceae
- Tribe: Cheloneae
- Genus: Penstemon; Schmidel

Species
- See List of Penstemon species.

Synonyms
- Apentostera Raf. (1837); Bartramia Salisb. (1796); Dasanthera Raf. (1819); Elmigera Rchb. ex Spach (1840); Leiostemon Raf. (1825); Lepteiris Raf. (1837)

= Penstemon =

Genus of plants

Penstemon /ˈpɛnstɪmən/, the beardtongues, is a large genus of roughly 280 species of flowering plants native to North America from northern Canada to Central America. It is the largest genus of flowering plants endemic to North America. As well as being the scientific name, penstemon is also widely used as a common name for all Penstemon species alongside beardtongues.

Formerly placed in the family Scrophulariaceae by the Cronquist system, new genetic research has placed it in the vastly expanded family Plantaginaceae. The total number of species is disagreed upon due to ongoing research into if some of the named species are actually subspecies or illegitimate concepts of previously described species.

== Description ==
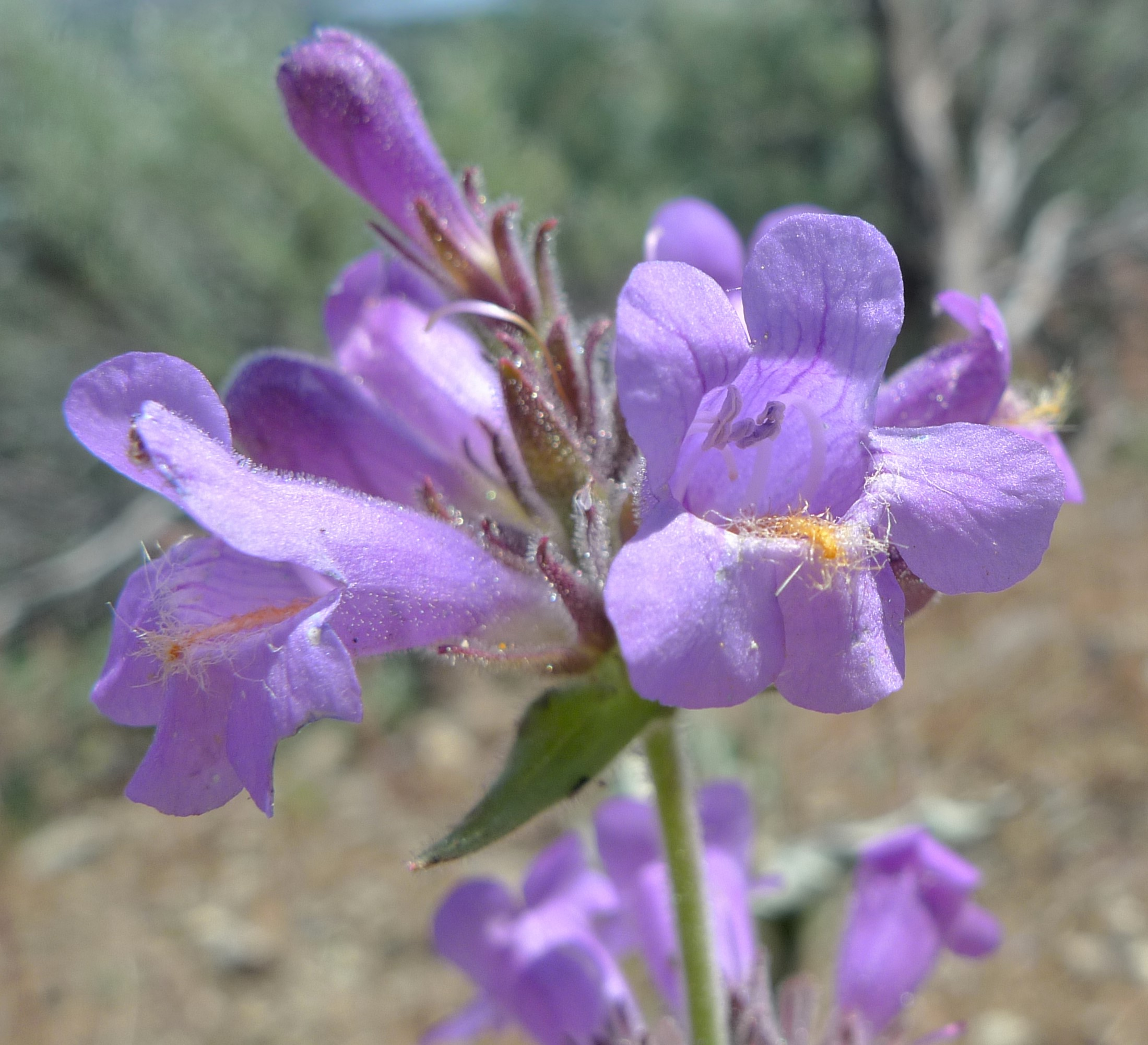
A prominent, often hairy, staminode is the most distinctive feature of this genus, as in these Penstemon eriantherus var. whitedii flowers

They have opposite (rarely alternate or whorled), two-lipped flowers with petals fused into a 2-lipped, 5-lobed tube extending into an opening called the throat, and fruits called seed capsules. The most distinctive features of the genus are the prominent staminode, an infertile stamen, and the often densely bearded palate. The staminode takes a variety of forms in the different species; while it is typically a long straight filament extending to the mouth of the corolla, some are longer and extremely hairy, giving the general appearance of an open mouth with a fuzzy tongue protruding and inspiring the common name of "beardtongue".

Most penstemons form a durable woody stem (a caudex) and have persistent basal leaves, but some are fully deciduous perennials, the remainder being shrubs or subshrubs. Heights can range from 10 cm to as much as 3 meters. Along with their variable growth forms, the penstemons have highly variable leaves, often with different leaf shapes and arrangements on different parts of the same plant. Some species have highly reduced, needle-like leaves and others broad and rounded leaves, with their texture also running the range of hairy to hairless/glabrous. In the view of Penstemon expert Robert Nold, the defining evolutionary characteristic of the genus is adaptation to drought, as demonstrated by their numbers and diversity in the interior west of North America.

Their distinctive flowers have fused petals shaped like a funnel or tube, distally extending into a wider mouth. At the opening of the flowers the petals are bilabiate, with a larger lip with three lobes towards the bottom of the flower and the smaller on the upper side with two lobes. Floral colors are quite varied with white, blue, violet, purple, pink, magenta, and red all being common. Much more rarely they may be yellow, though often only a pale shade of cream or ivory. The most frequent colors are shades of blue. The inside of the flowers and lips are very often marked by nectar guides in a distinctive hue, and the interior of the flower may also be a different color than the exterior. Relatively little is known about toxicity in penstemons and there are no reports of poisonings. However, species such as dusky penstemon (Penstemon whippleanus) are known to contain several alkaloids.

The one Asiatic species previously treated in Penstemon is now placed in a separate genus Pennellianthus. This leaves Penstemon a mostly Nearctic genus, with a few neotropical species. Although widespread across North America, and found in habitats ranging from open desert to moist forests, and up to alpine zones, they are not typically common within their range.

== Taxonomy ==
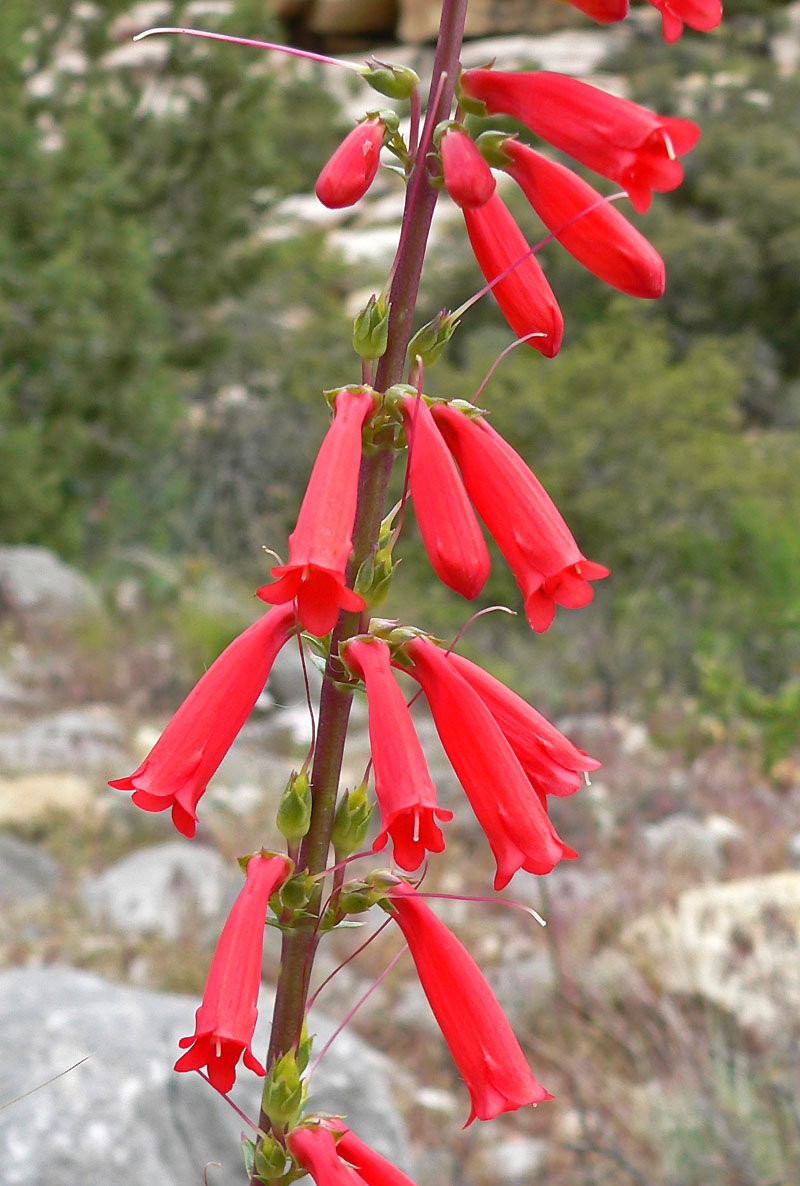
Firecracker penstemon (Penstemon eatonii)

Davidson's Penstemon (Penstemon davidsonii)

The Penstemon genus is placed in the large plantain family, Plantaginaceae, alongside others in tribe Cheloneae. Prior to 2005 they had usually been included in the figwort family, Scrophulariaceae.

Penstemon has been subdivided into six subgenera by using anther dehiscence patterns. Subgenera Cryptostemon and Dissecti each contain one species. As traditionally defined, subgenus Penstemon contains about 128 species, subgenus Habroanthus contains about 50, subgenus Saccanthera has about 28 species, and subgenus Dasanthera contains nine. Genetic analysis by Andrea D Wolfe et al. indicates that while some of the previously identified subgenera are natural groupings, many are hopelessly confused. Garden experiments by Glen Moore and other scientists have shown that even very distantly related species in the genus are capable of hybridizing. However, due to geographic isolation and soil preferences keeping species apart hybrids are rare in nature.

=== History ===
John Mitchell published the first scientific description in 1748; although he only named it as Penstemon, researchers David Way, Peter James, and Robert Nold identify it as Penstemon laevigatus. Linnaeus then included it in his 1753 publication, as Chelone pentstemon, altering the spelling to better correspond to the notion that the name referred to the unusual fifth stamen (Greek "penta-", five). The botanist Casimir Schmidel published a description of the species in 1763, and for this reason he is given priority in botanical publication. Mitchell's work was reprinted in 1769, continuing with his original spelling, and this was ultimately accepted as the official form, although Pentstemon continued in use into the 20th century. In addition, a rare spelling of Pentastemon is occasionally found in older works.

Although several more species were found in the early 18th century, they continued to be classified in Chelone until 1828 in some publications. The period of 1810 to 1850 increased the number of known species from 4 to 63, as expeditions traveled through Mexico and the western United States, followed by another 100 up to 1900, although not all these species remained classified as Penstemon.

The American members of the genus were extensively revised by David D. Keck between 1932 and 1957 and Richard Straw did similar work on the Mexican species slightly later. In 1960 the important book Penstemon Nomenclature was published by American Penstemon Society president Ralph Bennett with the advice of Keck. This book was updated and republished with the Robin Lodewick in 1980 and continued to be an important source of information about the genus through the year 2000.

Fieldwork in the remote parts of the Great Basin during the 20th century brought the total number of species known to over 270, though some of this total may be errors or now extinct species.

=== Species ===
There are at least 281 species that are valid according to both World Flora Online (WFO) and Plants of the World Online (POWO) as of 2024. In addition there are at least five naturally occurring hybrids, and seven recognized by POWO. In addition there are five other additional species that are recognized by WFO. Though there is agreement between POWO and WFO on many species, many additional species are considered valid by other sources. For example, there are 239 with full descriptions in the Flora of North America alone.

== Ecology ==
Most penstemon species have one of two pollination syndromes: adaptation to hummingbirds or to bees. The species relying on hummingbirds typically have flowers that are red or magenta, have narrow tubes, and that produce larger amounts of nectar from nectaries located deep inside the throat of the corolla. Bee-adapted species more often have blue or purple flowers, wide floral tubes, a longer lower lip for bees to land on, and produce less nectar. Adaptation to bees as pollinators is an ancestral trait for penstemons, but the derived trait of instead adapting to hummingbirds has emerged an estimated fifteen to twenty times over a relatively short evolutionary history.

== Distribution ==
Penstemon species are found in most of North America. One species, Penstemon gentianoides, has a native range that extends as far south as Guatemala and has been introduced to Costa Rica. Another species, Penstemon gormanii, grows in the Northwest Territories of Canada. No members of the genus have been known to grow natively in Nunavut, or east of Quebec in Canada. In addition to the same species as found in the Northwest Territories, two others also grow in parts of Alaska, Penstemon procerus and Penstemon serrulatus. Most of its species are found in the Nearctic botanical realm, but with a few species also found in the North American portion of the Neotropics. There are 70 species found in the state of Utah, more than anywhere else in its range and making this its center of diversity.

== Horticulture ==
Although penstemons are native to the Americas, Europe has traditionally been far more active in their hybridization with hundreds of hybrids developed since the early 19th century. The first offer of seeds for sale as by John Fraser in 1813. The earliest development is somewhat shrouded in mystery; for instance Flanagan & Nutting's 1835 catalog mentions a 'Penstemon Hybridum' but does not describe it.

By 1860, a half-dozen French growers are known to have developed hybrids, most notably Victor Lemoine, while in 1857 the German Wilhelm Pfitzer listed 24 varieties. In 1861 the British Royal Horticultural Society held trials in which 78 varieties were entered. The Scottish firm of John Forbes first offered penstemons in 1870, eventually becoming the biggest grower in the world; in 1884 their catalog listed 180 varieties. By 1900 Forbes had offered 550 varieties, while Lemoine had developed nearly 470 by the time of his death in 1911. Few of these have survived to the present day.

A number of different species have been used in the hybridization process, notably Penstemon cobaea and Penstemon hartwegii.

The American Penstemon Society was formed in 1946 to promote both horticultural and botanical interest, and is now the International Cultivar Registration Authority for the genus.

In North America, penstemons are often used in xeriscape gardening, as many are native to desert or alpine regions and quite hardy.

=== Cultivars ===
The following species and cultivars have gained the Royal Horticultural Society's Award of Garden Merit:-

- 'Andenken an Friedrich Hahn' (deep red)
- 'Beech Park' (pink/white)
- 'Connie's Pink' (rose pink)
- 'Evelyn' (rose pink)
- 'George Home' (red/white)
- 'Hewell Pink Bedder' (pink/white)
- 'Hidcote Pink'
- 'Margery Fish' (purple/blue)
- 'Maurice Gibbs' (purple-red/white)
- 'Osprey' (pink/white)
- P. hartwegii (scarlet)
- P. isophyllus (pale pink)
- P. pinifolius 'Wisley Flame' (orange-red)
- P. rupicola (pink)
- 'Port Wine' (deep red/white)
- 'Raven' (purple/white)
- 'Rich Ruby'
- 'Roy Davidson' (pink/white)
- 'Rubicundus' (red/white)
- 'Schoenholzeri' (red)
- 'Sour Grapes' (purple/blue)
- 'Stapleford Gem' (purple/blue)

Others include 'Dark Towers', developed by Dale Lindgren at the University of Nebraska–Lincoln.

== See also ==
- HMS Pentstemon
