= List of noctuid genera: F =

The huge moth family Noctuidae contains the following genera:

A B C D E F G H I J K L M N O P Q R S T U V W X Y Z

- Fabiania
- Facastis
- Facidia
- Facidina
- Fagitana
- Fala
- Falana
- Falcapyris
- Falcimala
- Farara
- Faronta
- Fautaua
- Feigeria
- Felinia
- Feliniopsis
- Feltia
- Fenaria
- Feralia
- Feredayia
- Ferenta
- Fergana
- Fimbriosotis
- Fishia
- Fissipunctia
- Flammona
- Flavyigoga
- Fleta
- Fletcheria
- Floccifera
- Focillidia
- Focillistis
- Focillodes
- Focillopis
- Fodina
- Folka
- Formosamyna
- Forsebia
- Fota
- Fotella
- Fotopsis
- Foveades
- Fracara
- Franclemontia
- Fredina
- Freilla
- Friesia
- Frivaldszkyola
- Fruva
- Fulvarba
- Funepistis
- Furvabromias
