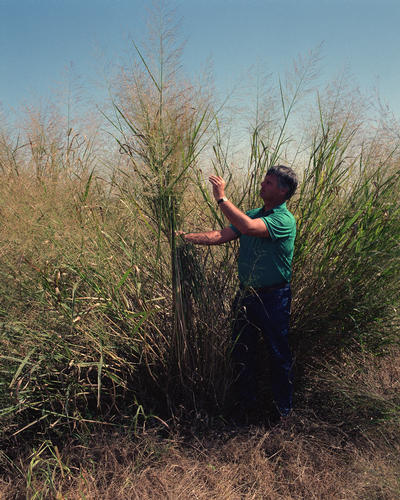

Conservation status
- Secure (NatureServe)

Scientific classification
- Kingdom: Plantae
- Clade: Tracheophytes
- Clade: Angiosperms
- Clade: Monocots
- Clade: Commelinids
- Order: Poales
- Family: Poaceae
- Subfamily: Panicoideae
- Genus: Panicum
- Species: P. virgatum

Binomial name
- Panicum virgatum L.

= Panicum virgatum =

Switchgrass

Species of plant

Panicum virgatum, commonly known as switchgrass and panic grass, is a perennial warm season bunchgrass native to North America, where it occurs naturally from 55°N latitude in Canada southwards into the United States and Mexico. Switchgrass is one of the dominant species of the central North American tallgrass prairie and can be found in remnant prairies, in native grass pastures, and naturalized along roadsides. It is used primarily for soil conservation, forage production, game cover, as an ornamental grass, in phytoremediation projects, fiber, electricity, heat production, for biosequestration of atmospheric carbon dioxide, and more recently as a biomass crop for the production of ethanol and butanol.

Other common names for switchgrass include tall panic grass, Wobsqua grass, blackbent, tall prairiegrass, wild redtop, thatchgrass, and Virginia switchgrass.

== Description ==
Switchgrass is a hardy, deep-rooted, perennial rhizomatous grass that begins growth in late spring. It can grow up to 2.7 m (8 ft 10 in) high, but is typically shorter than big bluestem grass or indiangrass. The leaves are 30–90 cm (12–35 in) long, with a prominent midrib. Switchgrass uses C_{4} carbon fixation, giving it an advantage in conditions of drought and high temperature. Its flowers have a well-developed panicle, often up to 60 cm (24 in) long, and it bears a good crop of seeds. The seeds are 3–6 mm (1/8–1/4 in) long and up to 1.5 mm (1/16 in) wide, and are developed from a single-flowered spikelet. Both glumes are present and well developed. When ripe, the seeds sometimes take on a pink or dull-purple tinge, and turn golden brown with the foliage of the plant in the fall. Switchgrass is both a perennial and self-seeding crop, which means farmers do not have to plant and reseed after annual harvesting. Once established, a switchgrass stand can survive for ten years or longer. Unlike corn, switchgrass can grow on marginal lands and requires relatively modest levels of chemical fertilizers. Overall, it is considered a resource-efficient, low-input crop for producing bioenergy from farmland.

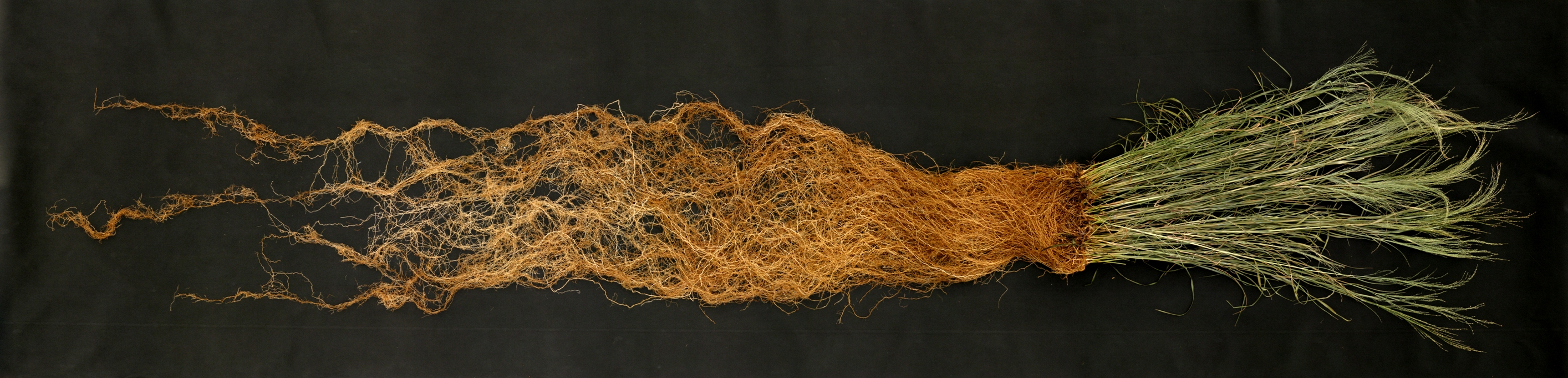
Root system of switchgrass grown at the Land Institute

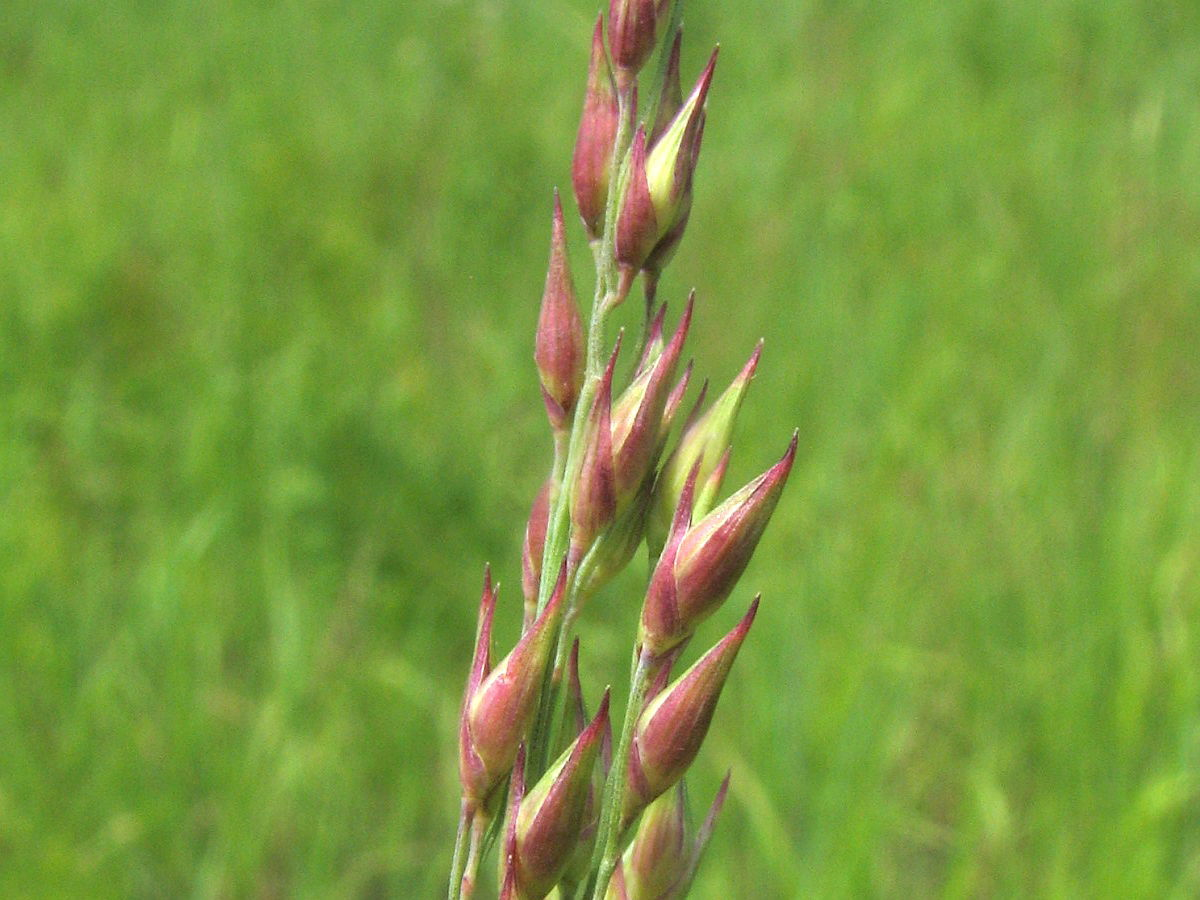
Seeds, Kirt Prairie

== Habitat ==
Much of North America, especially the prairies of the Midwestern United States, was once prime habitat to vast swaths of native grasses, including switchgrass, indiangrass (Sorghastrum nutans), eastern gamagrass (Tripsacum dactyloides), big bluestem (Andropogon gerardi), little bluestem (Schizachyrium scoparium) and others. As European settlers began spreading west across the continent, the native grasses were plowed under and the land converted to crops such as corn, wheat, and oats. Introduced grasses such as fescue, bluegrass, and orchardgrass also replaced the native grasses for use as hay and pasture for cattle.

== Distribution ==
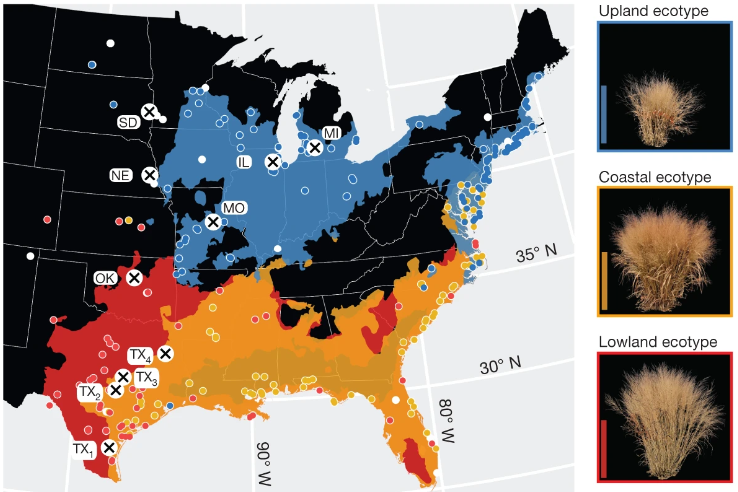
Panicum virgatum ecotypes and their distribution in the United States of America

Switchgrass is a versatile and adaptable plant. It can grow and even thrive in many weather conditions, lengths of growing seasons, soil types, and land conditions. Its distribution spans south of latitude 55°N from Saskatchewan to Nova Scotia, south over most of the United States east of the Rocky Mountains, and further south into Mexico. As a warm-season perennial grass, most of its growth occurs from late spring through early fall; it becomes dormant and unproductive during colder months. Thus, the productive season in its northern habitat can be as short as three months, but in the southern reaches of its habitat the growing season may be as long as eight months, around the Gulf Coast area.

Switchgrass is a diverse species, with striking differences between plants. This diversity, which presumably reflects evolution and adaptation to new environments as the species spread across the continent, provides a range of valuable traits for breeding programs. Switchgrass has two distinct forms, or "cytotypes": the lowland cultivars, which tend to produce more biomass, and the upland cultivars, which are generally of more northern origin, more cold-tolerant, and therefore usually preferred in northern areas. Upland switchgrass types are generally shorter, at ≤ 2.4 m (7 ft 10 in) tall, and less coarse than lowland types. Lowland cultivars may grow to ≥ 2.7 m (8 ft 10 in) in favorable environments. Both upland and lowland cultivars are deeply rooted, > 1.8 m (5 ft 11 in) in favorable soils, and have short rhizomes. The upland types tend to have more vigorous rhizomes, so the lowland cultivars may appear to have a bunchgrass habit, while the upland types tend to be more sod-forming. Lowland cultivars appear more plastic in their morphology, produce larger plants if stands become thin or when planted in wide rows, and they seem to be more sensitive to moisture stress than upland cultivars.

In native prairies, switchgrass is historically found in association with several other important native tallgrass prairie plants, such as big bluestem, indiangrass, little bluestem, sideoats grama, eastern gamagrass, and various forbs (sunflowers, gayfeather, prairie clover, and prairie coneflower). These widely adapted tallgrass species once occupied millions of hectares.

Switchgrass' suitability for cultivation in the Gran Chaco is being studied by Argentina's Instituto Nacional de Tecnología Agropecuaria (INTA).

== Establishment and management ==
Switchgrass can be grown on land considered unsuitable for row crop production, including land that is too erodible for corn production, as well as sandy and gravelly soils in humid regions that typically produce low yields of other farm crops. No single method of establishing switchgrass can be suggested for all situations. The crop can be established both by no-till and conventional tillage. When seeded as part of a diverse mixture, planting guidelines for warm-season grass mixtures for conservation plantings should be followed. Regional guidelines for growing and managing switchgrass for bioenergy or conservation plantings are available. Several key factors can increase the likelihood of success for establishing switchgrass. These include:

- Planting switchgrass after the soil is well warmed during the spring.
- Using seeds that are highly germinable and planting 0.6 - 1.2 cm deep, or up to 2 cm deep in sandy soils.
- Packing or firming the soil both before and after seeding.
- Providing no fertilization at planting to minimize competition.
- Controlling weeds with chemical and/or cultural control methods.

Mowing and properly labeled herbicides are recommended for weed control. Chemical weed control can be used in the fall prior to establishment, or before or after planting. Weeds should be mowed just above the height of the growing switchgrass. Hormone herbicides, such as 2,4-D, should be avoided as they are known to reduce development of switchgrass when applied early in the establishing year. Plantings that appear to have failed due to weed infestations are often wrongly assessed, as the failure is often more apparent than real. Switchgrass stands that are initially weedy commonly become well established with appropriate management in subsequent years. Once established, switchgrass can take up to three years to reach its full production potential. Depending on the region, it can typically produce 1/4 to 1/3 of its yield potential in its first year and 2/3 of its potential in the year after seeding.

After establishment, switchgrass management will depend on the goal of the seeding. Historically, most switchgrass seedings have been managed for the Conservation Reserve Program in the US. Disturbance such as periodic mowing, burning, or disking is required to optimize the stand's utility for encouraging biodiversity. Increased attention is being placed on switchgrass management as an energy crop. Generally, the crop requires modest application of nitrogen fertilizer, as it is not a heavy feeder. Typical nitrogen (N) content of senescent material in the fall is 0.5% N. Fertilizer nitrogen applications of about 5 kg N/hectare (ha) applied for each tonne of biomass removed is a general guideline. More specific recommendations for fertilization are available regionally in North America. Herbicides are not often used on switchgrass after the seeding year, as the crop is generally quite competitive with weeds. Most bioenergy conversion processes for switchgrass, including those for cellulosic ethanol and pellet fuel production, can generally accept some alternative species in the harvested biomass. Stands of switchgrass should be harvested no more than twice per year, and one cutting often provides as much biomass as two. Switchgrass can be harvested with the same field equipment used for hay production, and it is well-suited to baling or bulk field harvesting. If its biology is properly taken into consideration, switchgrass can offer great potential as an energy crop.

== Uses ==
Switchgrass can be used as a feedstock for biomass energy production, as ground cover for soil conservation, and to control erosion, for forages and grazing, as game cover, and as feedstock for biodegradable plastics. It can be used by cattle farmers for hay and pasture and as a substitute for wheat straw in many applications, including livestock bedding, straw bale housing, and as a substrate for growing mushrooms.

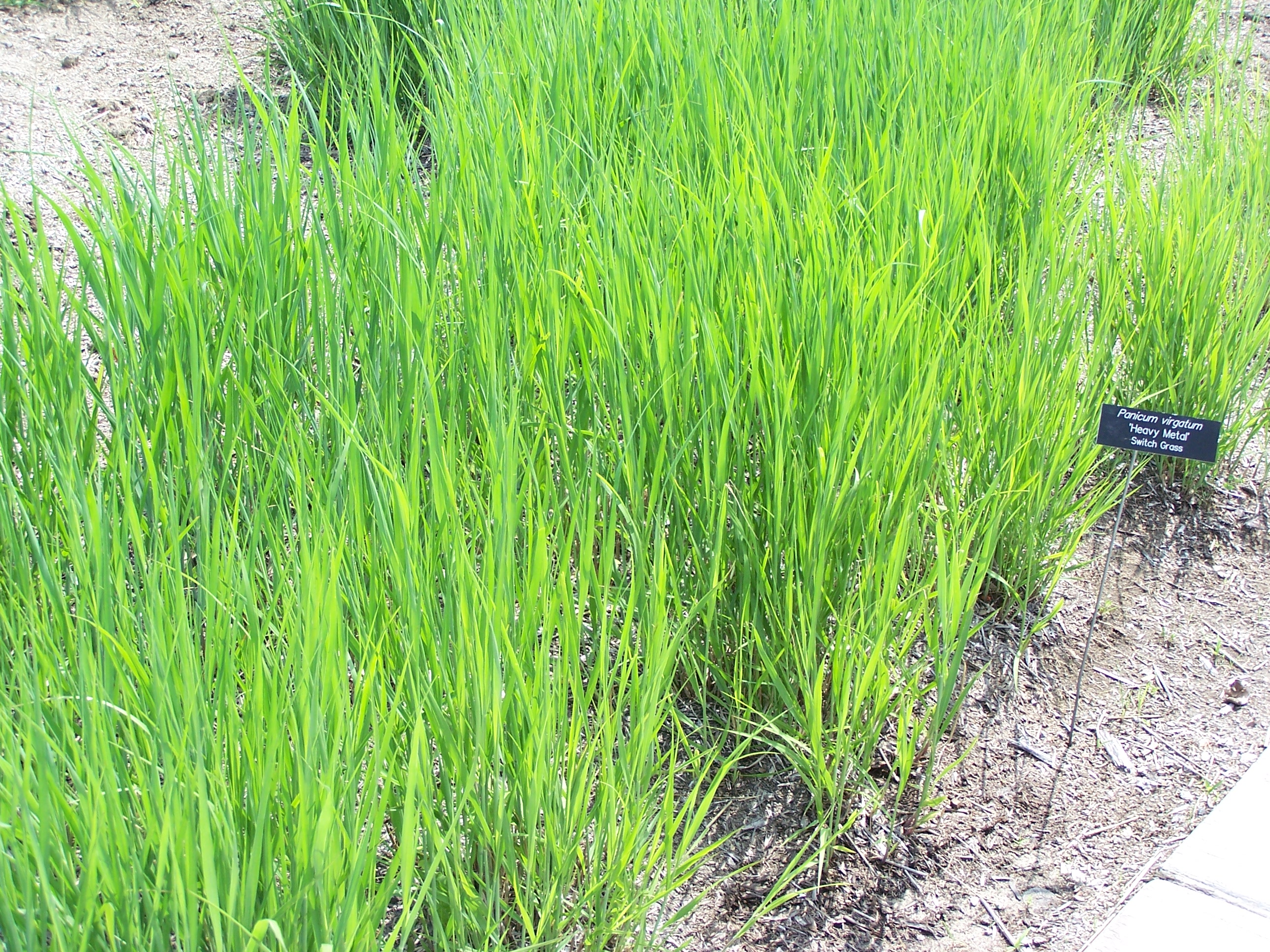
Panicum virgatum 'Heavy Metal', an ornamental switchgrass, in early summer

Additionally, switchgrass is grown as a drought-resistant ornamental grass in average to wet soils and in full sun to part shade.

=== Moth host plant ===
It is the preferred larval host plant of Dargida rubripennis. It is also a larval host for the Delaware skipper and the Hobomok skipper.

=== Bioenergy ===
Switchgrass has been studied as a potential renewable bioenergy crop since the mid-1980s, because it is a native perennial warm season grass with the ability to produce moderate to high yields on marginal farmlands. It is now being considered for use in several bioenergy conversion processes, including cellulosic ethanol production, biogas, and direct combustion for thermal energy applications. The main agronomic advantages of switchgrass as a bioenergy crop are its stand longevity, drought and flooding tolerance, relatively low herbicide and fertilizer input requirements, ease of management, hardiness in poor soil and climate conditions, and widespread adaptability in temperate climates. In some warm humid southern zones, such as Alabama, it has the ability to produce up to 25 oven-dry tonnes per hectare (ODT/ha). A summary of switchgrass yields across 13 research trial sites in the United States found the top two cultivars in each trial to yield 9.4 to 22.9 t/ha, with an average yield of 14.6 ODT/ha. However, these yields were recorded on small plot trials, and commercial field sites could be expected to yield at least 20% less. In the United States, switchgrass yields appear to be highest in warm humid regions with long growing seasons such as the US Southeast and lowest in the dry short season areas of the Northern Great Plains. The energy inputs required to grow switchgrass are favorable when compared with annual seed bearing crops such as corn, soybean, or canola, which can require relatively high energy inputs for field operations, crop drying, and fertilization. Whole plant herbaceous perennial C4 grass feedstocks are desirable biomass energy feedstocks, as they require fewer fossil energy inputs to grow and effectively capture solar energy because of their C4 photosynthetic system and perennial nature. One study concluded that it takes from 0.97 to 1.34 GJ to produce 1 tonne of switchgrass, compared with 1.99 to 2.66 GJ to produce 1 tonne of corn. Another study found that switchgrass uses 0.8 GJ/ODT of fossil energy compared to grain corn's 2.9 GJ/ODT. As switchgrass contains approximately 18.8 GJ/ODT of biomass, the energy output-to-input ratio for the crop can be up to 20:1. This highly favorable ratio is attributable to its relatively high energy output per hectare and low energy inputs for production.

Considerable effort is being expended to develop switchgrass as a cellulosic ethanol crop in the USA. In George W. Bush's 2006 State of the Union Address, he proposed using switchgrass for ethanol; since then, over US$100 million has been invested into researching switchgrass as a potential biofuel source. Switchgrass has the potential to produce up to 380 liters of ethanol per tonne harvested; however, current technology for herbaceous biomass conversion to ethanol is about 340 liters per tonne. By contrast, corn ethanol yields about 400 liters per tonne.

The main advantage of switchgrass over corn as an ethanol feedstock is that switchgrass's cost of production is generally about 1/2 that of grain corn, and more biomass energy per hectare can be captured in the field. Thus, switchgrass cellulosic ethanol should give a higher yield of ethanol per hectare at lower cost. However, this will depend on whether the cost of constructing and operating cellulosic ethanol plants can be reduced considerably. The switchgrass ethanol industry energy balance is also considered to be substantially better than that of corn ethanol. During the bioconversion process, the lignin fraction of switchgrass can be burned to provide sufficient steam and electricity to operate the biorefinery. Studies have found that for every unit of energy input needed to create a biofuel from switchgrass, four units of energy are yielded. In contrast, corn ethanol yields about 1.28 units of energy per unit of energy input. A 2008 study from the Great Plains indicated that for ethanol production from switchgrass, this figure is 6.4, or alternatively, that 540% more energy was contained in the ethanol produced than was used in growing the switchgrass and converting it to liquid fuel. However, there remain commercialization barriers to the development of cellulosic ethanol technology. Projections in the early 1990s for commercialization of cellulosic ethanol by the year 2000 have not been met. The commercialization of cellulosic ethanol is thus proving to be a significant challenge, despite considerable research efforts.

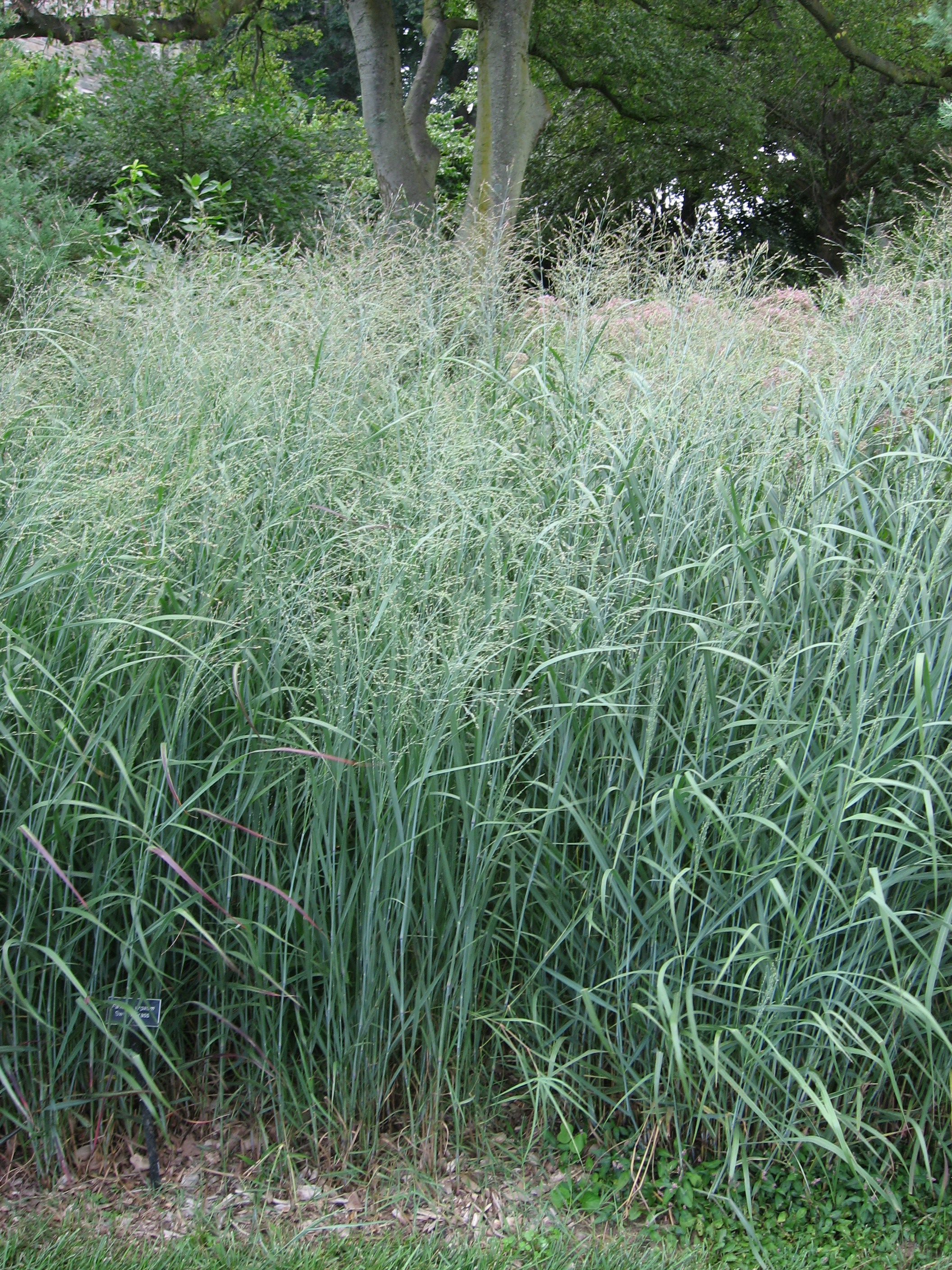

Thermal energy applications for switchgrass appear to be closer to near-term scale-up than cellulosic ethanol for industrial or small-scale applications. For example, switchgrass can be pressed into fuel pellets that are subsequently burned in pellet stoves used to heat homes (which typically burn corn or wood pellets). Switchgrass has been widely tested as a substitute for coal in power generation. The most widely studied project to date has been the Chariton Valley Project in Iowa. The Show-Me-Energy Cooperative (SMEC) in Missouri is using switchgrass and other warm-season grasses, along with wood residues, as feedstocks for pellets used for the firing of a coal-fired power plant. In Eastern Canada, switchgrass is being used on a pilot scale as a feedstock for commercial heating applications. Combustion studies have been undertaken and it appears to be well-suited as a commercial boiler fuel. Research is also being undertaken to develop switchgrass as a pellet fuel because of lack of surplus wood residues in eastern Canada, as a slowdown in the forest products industry in 2009 is now resulting in wood pellet shortages throughout Eastern North America. Generally speaking, the direct firing of switchgrass for thermal applications can provide the highest net energy gain and energy output-to-input ratio of all switchgrass bioconversion processes. Research has found switchgrass, when pelletized and used as a solid biofuel, is a good candidate for displacing fossil fuels. Switchgrass pellets were identified to have a 14.6:1 energy output-to-input ratio, which is substantially better than that for liquid biofuel options from farmland. As a greenhouse gas mitigation strategy, switchgrass pellets were found to be an effective means to use farmland to mitigate greenhouse gases on the order of 7.6–13 tonnes of CO_{2} per hectare. In contrast, switchgrass cellulosic ethanol and corn ethanol were found to mitigate 5.2 and 1.5 tonnes of CO_{2} per hectare, respectively.

Historically, the major constraint to the development of grasses for thermal energy applications has been the difficulty associated with burning grasses in conventional boilers, as biomass quality problems can be of particular concern in combustion applications. These technical problems now appear to have been largely resolved through crop management practices such as fall mowing and spring harvesting that allow for leaching to occur, which leads to fewer aerosol-forming compounds (such as K and Cl) and N in the grass. This reduces clinker formation and corrosion, and enables switchgrass to be a clean combustion fuel source for use in smaller combustion appliances. Fall harvested grasses likely have more application for larger commercial and industrial boilers. Switchgrass is also used to heat small industrial and farm buildings in Germany and China through a process used to make a low quality natural gas substitute.

Bai et al. (2010) conducted a study to analyze the environmental sustainability of using switchgrass plant material as a feedstock for ethanol production. Life cycle analysis was used to make this assessment. They compared efficiency of E10, E85, and ethanol with gasoline. They took into account air and water emissions associated with growing, managing, processing and storing the switchgrass crop. They also factored in the transportation of the stored switchgrass to the ethanol plant where they assumed the distance was 20 km. The reductions in global warming potential by using E10 and E85 were 5 and 65%, respectively. Their models also suggested that the "human toxicity potential" and "eco-toxicity potential" were substantially greater for the high ethanol fuels (i.e., E85 and ethanol) than for gasoline and E10.

In 2014, a genetically altered form of the bacterium Caldicellulosiruptor bescii was created which can cheaply and efficiently turn switchgrass into ethanol.

=== Biodegradable plastics production ===
In a novel application, US scientists have genetically modified switchgrass to enable it to produce polyhydroxybutyrate, which accumulates in beadlike granules within the plant's cells. In preliminary tests, the dry weight of a plants leaves were shown to comprise up to 3.7% of the polymer. Such low accumulation rates do not, as of 2009, allow for commercial use of switchgrass as a biosource.

=== Soil conservation ===
Switchgrass is useful for soil conservation and amendment, particularly in the United States and Canada, where switchgrass is endemic. Switchgrass has a deep fibrous root system – nearly as deep as the plant is tall. Since it, along with other native grasses and forbs, once covered the plains of the United States that are now the Corn Belt, the effects of the past switchgrass habitat have been beneficial, lending to the fertile farmland that exists today. The deep fibrous root systems of switchgrass left a deep rich layer of organic matter in the soils of the Midwest, making those mollisol soils some of the most productive in the world. By returning switchgrass and other perennial prairie grasses as an agricultural crop, many marginal soils may benefit from increased levels of organic material, permeability, and fertility, due to the grass's deep root system.

Soil erosion, both from wind and water, is of great concern in regions where switchgrass grows. Due to its height, switchgrass can form an effective wind erosion barrier. Its root system, also, is excellent for holding soil in place, which helps prevent erosion from flooding and runoff. Some highway departments (for example, KDOT) have used switchgrass in their seed mixes when re-establishing growth along roadways. It can also be used on strip mine sites, dikes, and pond dams. Conservation districts in many parts of the United States use it to control erosion in grass waterways because of its ability to anchor soils while providing habitat for wildlife.

=== Forages and grazing ===
Switchgrass is an excellent forage for cattle; however, it has shown toxicity in horses, sheep, and goats through chemical compounds known as saponins, which cause photosensitivity and liver damage in these animals. Researchers are continuing to learn more about the specific conditions under which switchgrass causes harm to these species, but until more is discovered, it is recommended that switchgrass not be fed to them. For cattle, however, it can be fed as hay, or grazed.

Grazing switchgrass calls for watchful management practices to ensure survival of the stand. It is recommended that grazing begin when the plants are about 50 cm tall, that grazing be discontinued when the plants have been eaten down to about 25 cm, and that the pasture be rested for 30–45 days between grazing periods. Switchgrass becomes stemmy and unpalatable as it matures, but during the target grazing period, it is a favorable forage with a relative feed value (RFV) of 90–104. The grass's upright growth pattern places its growing point off the soil surface onto its stem, so leaving 25 cm of stubble is important for regrowth. When harvesting switchgrass for hay, the first cutting occurs at the late boot stage – around mid-June. This should allow for a second cutting in mid-August, leaving enough regrowth to survive the winter.

=== Game cover ===
Switchgrass is well known among wildlife conservationists as good forage and habitat for upland game bird species, such as pheasant, quail, grouse, and wild turkey, and song birds, with its plentiful small seeds and tall cover. A study published in 2015 has shown that switchgrass, when grown in a traditional monoculture, has an adverse impact on some wildlife. Depending on how thickly switchgrass is planted, and what it is partnered with, it also offers excellent forage and cover for other wildlife across the country. For those producers who have switchgrass stands on their farm, it is considered an environmental and aesthetic benefit due to the abundance of wildlife attracted by the switchgrass stands. Some members of Prairie Lands Bio-Products, Inc. in Iowa have even turned this benefit into a profitable business by leasing their switchgrass land for hunting during the proper seasons. The benefits to wildlife can be extended even in large-scale agriculture through the process of strip harvesting, as recommended by The Wildlife Society, which suggests that rather than harvesting an entire field at once, strip harvesting could be practiced so that the entire habitat is not removed, thereby protecting the wildlife inhabiting the switchgrass.

=== Ornamental cultivars ===
Panicum virgatum cultivars are used as ornamental plants in gardens and landscaping. The following have gained the Royal Horticultural Society's Award of Garden Merit:-

- 'Dallas Blues'
- "Heavy Metal'
- 'Hänse Harms'
- 'Northwind'
- 'Shenandoah'

=== Forage and Bioenergy Cultivars ===
Panicum virgatum has also been extensively cultivated for forage and bioenergy purposes. Unlike ornamental types, these cultivars are bred for traits such as high biomass production, rapid growth, deep rooting, and resilience to environmental stresses. Forage types are commonly used in grazing systems due to their high digestibility and adaptability across diverse soil conditions. Bioenergy-specific cultivars are developed to maximize lignocellulosic biomass for renewable fuel production and are particularly valuable in sustainable energy systems. In addition to environmental benefits, these cultivars contribute to increased farm profitability, especially when grown on marginal lands that are less suitable for conventional food crops.

Forage/Conservation varieties
Cultivar	Release year	Ecotype	USDA Zones	Plant Introduction Number
Blackwell	1944	Upland	5-7	PI421520
Caddo	1955	Upland	6-7	PI 476297
Sunburst	1998	Upland	3-5	PI 598136

Bioenergy varieties
Cultivar	Release Year	Ecotype	USDA Zones	Plant Introduction number
BoMaster	2008	Lowland	6-8	PI 645256
Liberty	2014	Lowland	4-6	PI 669371
Independence	2021	Lowland	5b-7b	PI 704577

== See also ==
- Algae fuel
- Backyard Wildlife Habitat
- Big Bluestem
- Brachypodium distachyon
- Butanol fuel
- Cellulosic ethanol
- Energy crop
- Energy-efficient landscaping
- Natural landscaping
- Phytoremediation
- Wildlife garden
