= Athrycia cinerea =

Scientific classification
- Kingdom: Animalia
- Phylum: Arthropoda
- Class: Insecta
- Order: Diptera
- Family: Tachinidae
- Subfamily: Dexiinae
- Tribe: Voriini
- Genus: Athrycia
- Species: A. cinerea

Binomial name
- Athrycia cinerea (Coquillett, 1895)

Synonyms
- Paraplagia cinerea Coquillett, 1895

Species of fly

Athrycia cinerea is a species of fly in the family Tachinidae. It is a parasitoid of multiple insects with the common name of armyworm, including Mamestra configurata, Mythimna unipuncta, Spodoptera frugiperda, and Dargida diffusa.

== Distribution ==
Canada, United States, Mexico.
