= Fergana (disambiguation) =

Fergana is a city in eastern Uzbekistan, capital of Fergana Province.

Fergana may also refer to:

== Geography ==
- Fergana Airport, an airport in eastern Uzbekistan, serving the city of Fergana
- Fergana Oblast, a former oblast of the Russian Empire, located in the Fergana Valley
- Fergana Region, a viloyat of Uzbekistan, located in the southern part of the Fergana Valley
- Fergana Range, a mountain range in Tian Shan in the Kyrgyz Republic.
- Fergana Valley, a region in Central Asia spreading across eastern Uzbekistan, Kyrgyzstan and Tajikistan
- Great Fergana Canal, an artificial canal covering 270 km in the Fergana Valley

== History ==
- Kingdom of Fergana, a former state in Central Asia
- Fergana massacre

== Linguistics ==
- Fergana Kipchak language, an old Turkic language from Central Asia

== Sports ==
- Fergana Challenger, a professional tennis tournament

== Zoology ==
- Fergana horse, an extinct horse breed from Central Asia
- Fergana (moth), an insect from the family Noctuidae
