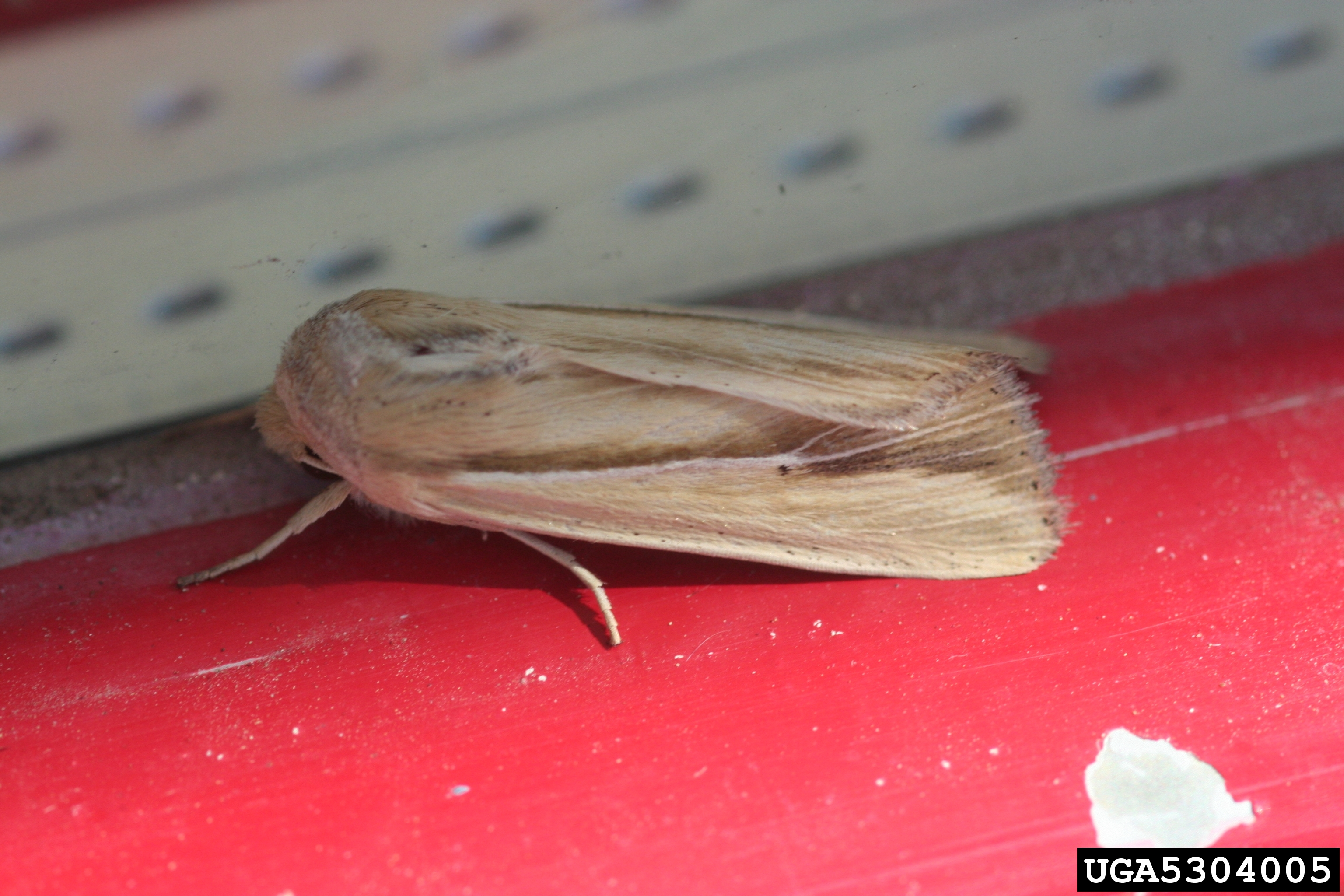
- Faronta diffusa

Scientific classification
- Domain: Eukaryota
- Kingdom: Animalia
- Phylum: Arthropoda
- Class: Insecta
- Order: Lepidoptera
- Superfamily: Noctuoidea
- Family: Noctuidae
- Genus: Faronta; Smith, 1908

= Faronta =

Genus of moths

Faronta was a genus of moths of the family Noctuidae. It is now considered a synonym of Dargida.

== Former species ==
- Faronta albilinea (Hübner, [1821])
- Faronta aleada Smith, 1908
- Faronta amoena (Draudt, 1924)
- Faronta confundibilis Köhler, 1973
- Faronta diffusa (Walker, 1856)
- Faronta disticta (Druce, 1908)
- Faronta exoul (Walker, 1856)
- Faronta multistria (Köhler, 1947)
- Faronta napali (Köhler, 1959)
- Faronta quadrannulata (Morrison, 1875)
- Faronta rubripennis (Grote & Robinson, 1870)
- Faronta terrapictalis Buckett, 1967, [1969]
- Faronta tetera (Smith, 1902)
