= Fabiania =

Fabiania is the scientific name of two genera of organisms and may refer to:

- Fabiania (foraminifera), a genus of protists in the family Cymbaloporidae
- Fabiania (moth), a genus of insects in the family Noctuidae
