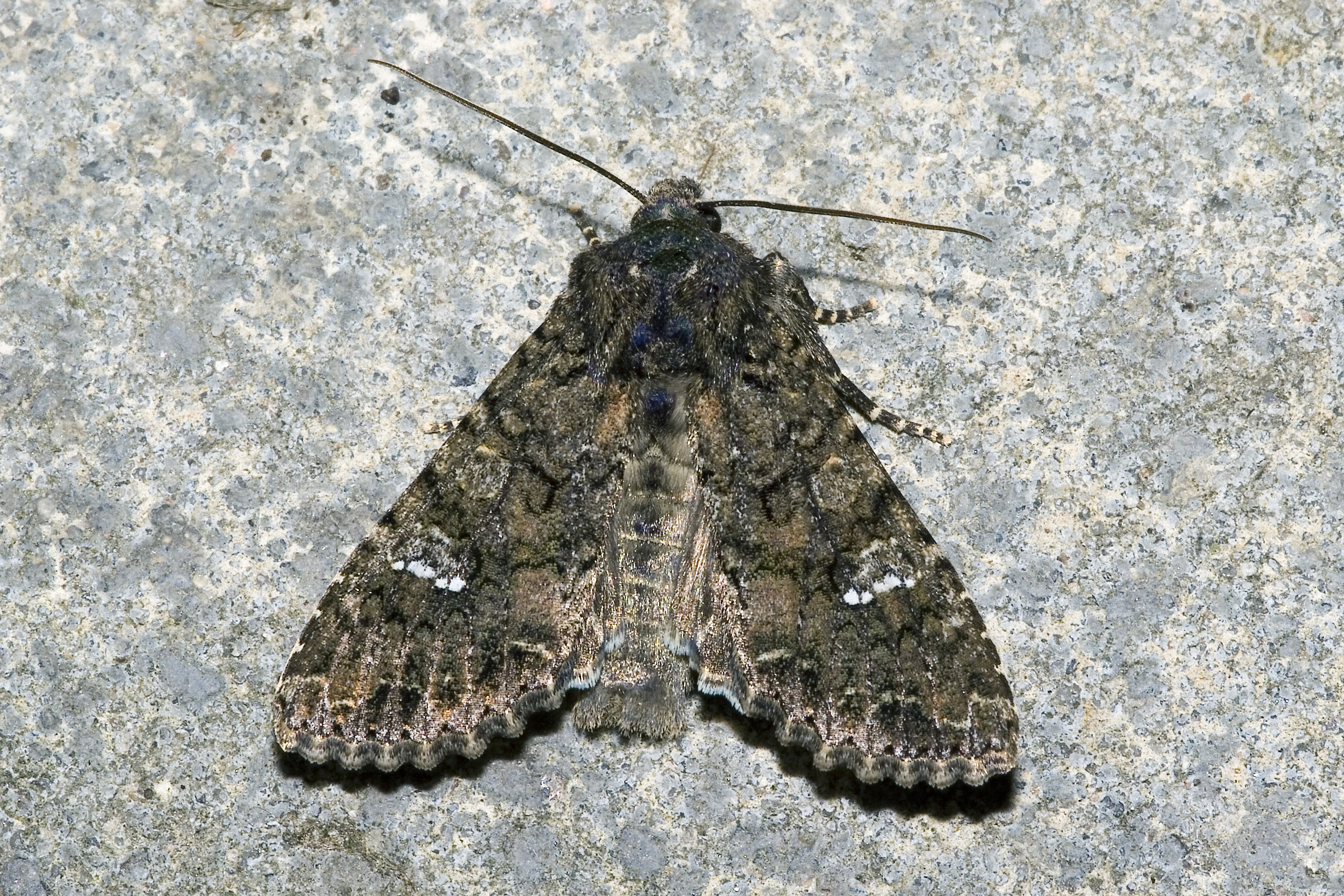

Scientific classification
- Kingdom: Animalia
- Phylum: Arthropoda
- Class: Insecta
- Order: Lepidoptera
- Superfamily: Noctuoidea
- Family: Noctuidae
- Genus: Mamestra
- Species: M. brassicae

Binomial name
- Mamestra brassicae (Linnaeus, 1758)

= Cabbage moth =

Species of moth

The cabbage moth (Mamestra brassicae) is primarily known as a pest that is responsible for severe crop damage of a wide variety of plant species. The common name, cabbage moth, is a misnomer as the species feeds on many fruits, vegetables, and crops in the genus Brassica (i.e. cabbage, broccoli, Brussels sprouts). Other notable host plants include tobacco, sunflower, and tomato, making this pest species particularly economically damaging.

The moth spans a wide geographic range encompassing the entire Palearctic region. Due to this wide geographic region and the presence of various populations globally, local adaptations have resulted in a species with high variability in life history and behavior across different populations.

== Geographic range ==
The cabbage moth has a wide geographic distribution across parts of Europe and Asia ranging from about 30°N to 70°N in latitude. This geographic range is within the Palearctic region, which includes parts of Europe, Asia north of the Himalayan Mountains, and Africa north of the Sahara Desert. As many host plants are both endemic or domesticated in various parts of this region, the moth is able to successfully thrive in nearly all parts of this region due to local adaptation (Masaki).

While the moth is generally limited to this range, there is a threat that it could be introduced to new regions through global food trade industries involving live plant imports.

== Taxonomy ==
The cabbage moth, Mamestra brassicae, should not be confused with the cabbage looper (Trichoplusia ni) or the white cabbage butterfly (Pieris rapae) which share similar names but occupy different taxonomies.

Mamestra brassicae belongs to the order Lepidoptera (moths and butterflies). Within this order, the species belongs to the clade Ditrysia, which contains 98% of the Lepidoptera species and indicates that the female has two separate openings for mating and laying eggs. The species belongs to the family Noctuidae, the second largest family in Lepidoptera. Within this family, the cabbage moth falls within the subfamily Hadeninae. The genus Mamestra is home to many pest species and has a global distribution.

== Technical description and variation ==
B. brassicae L. (= albicolon Stph., nec Hbn., ochracea Tutt) Forewing grey-brown varied with fuscous: lines pale, dark-edged; orbicular stigma rounded, reniform large, white-spotted, or filled in with white; hindwing brownish, with a paler mark near end of vein 2. - The insect varies in opposite directions; - ab. albidilinea Haw. is a blackish form with the reniform stigma and submarginal line white, occurring occasionally in Europe as well as in Britain; — scotochroma Rob., a local German form, is melanic, with both wings blackish, much like albidilinea, but without the white submarginal line; — unicolor Tutt has all the markings, dark and light, more or less lost in the fuscous suffusion, the reniform edged only with whitish; — on the other hand andalusica Stgr. from Spain (? = straminea Failla-Ted., from Sicily and Italy) is pale grey- brown with a faint ochreous flush, darker grey in female, with all markings obscured except the 3 stigmata which are strikingly pale, with partial blackish outline, especially on their lower edge, the claviform sometimes grey; — decolorata Stgr. from Issykkul and other localities in Central Asia is pale greyish brown, with the stigmata as in andalusica, but with the markings, especially the submarginal ones, not obsolete; — canescens Moore from Yarkand, which I have not seen, is, judging from the figure, very close to, if not identical with, decolorata which it antedates by 10 years. Larva polyphagous, varying in ground colour from green to brown and blackish, with broad pale spiracular line; a dorsal hump on segment 11.

== Life history ==
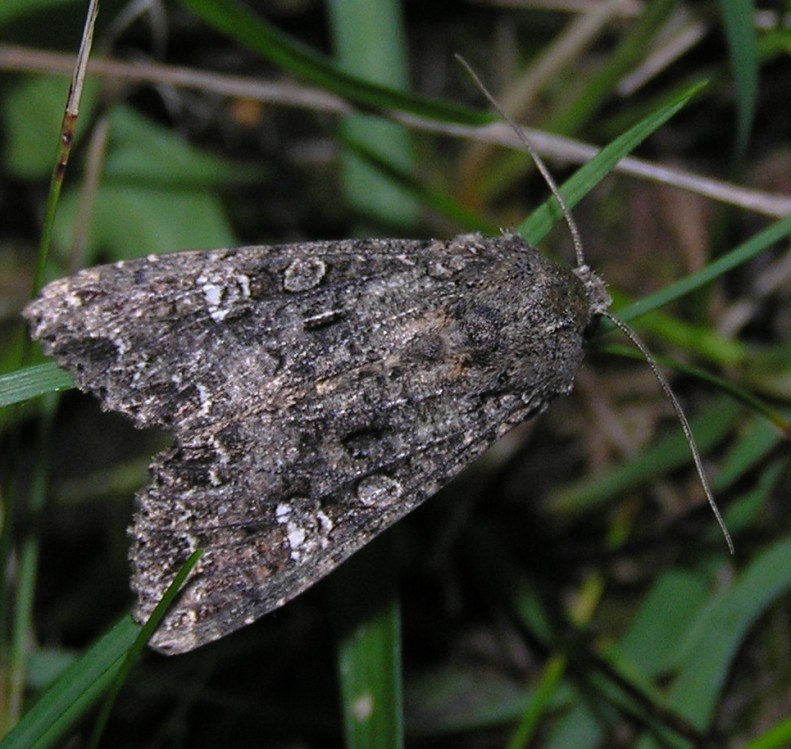
Adult cabbage moth

The life history is highly variable depending on the location of the population. Some populations are able to fit two to three generations within one calendar year. Other populations, in less favorable climates, may have only one generation in a given year. Diapause is this species' most variable life stage, lasting anywhere from 80 days to six months if needed over the winter.

=== Eggs ===
Upon oviposition, the eggs are pale white, oblong, hemispherical, and ribbed. The eggs also develop a brown marking at their center. The egg typically measures 1.2 mm in diameter and hatch within six to ten days.

=== Caterpillars ===
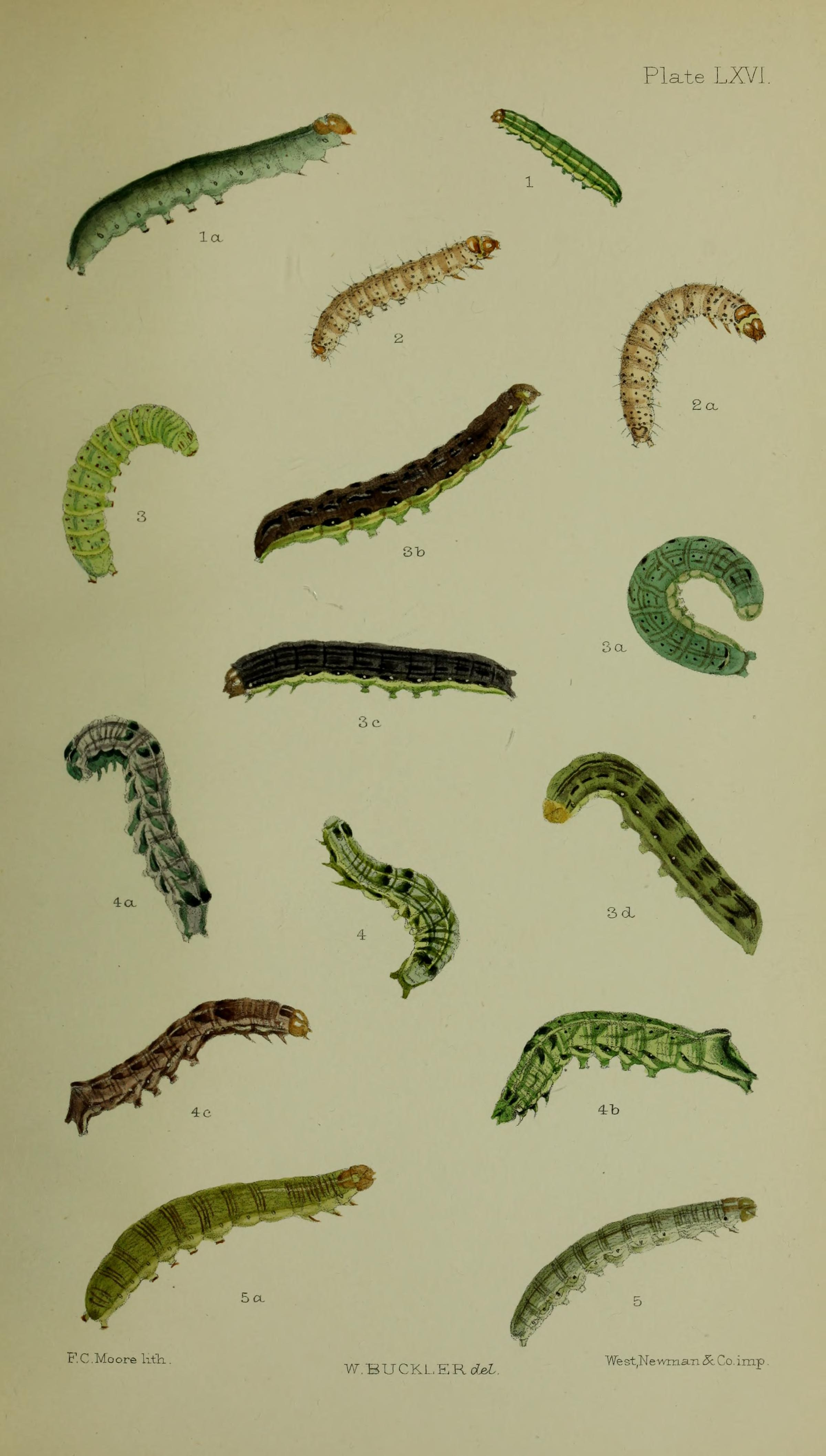
Figs 3, 3a, 3b, 3c, 3d larva after last moult

The caterpillar progresses through six instars of development. In the first instar, the caterpillar has a light green body with three pairs of legs along the thorax and an anal appendage at the end of the abdomen. The caterpillars remain relatively the same in color until the fourth instar, in which the dorsal region darkens. The dorsal region now appears brown while the ventral region turns yellow. There is some variability in coloring at this stage. There is also a dark stripe that appears to run down the length of the caterpillar with light yellow stripes flanking the sides. The head is a copper color. At the sixth and final instar, the head remains copper and the body and develop a dorsal hump. The total time for this larval development is four to six weeks and the final body length ranges from 40–50 millimetres (1 9/16–1 15/16 in).

==== Colors and patterns ====
Known colors, closures and patterns include-

- Many have back and side stripes; dark back marks, various white back and side spots; dark 'tier tread marks' type patches; big, shiny, brownish or coppery colored eyes, and a dark back central back stripe.
- Grey above, pick side stripe and tan bottom.
- Like a peace red-brown earth
- Like a peace grey-brown earth
- Tan above, white and then yellow stripe and pink underside.
- Green, khaki, grey-brown or brown with dark spots
- Green-grey above, yellow stripe and light green below
- Grey green with a dark green back stripe
- Black above, yellow side stripe and light yellow green below *
1. The flight season refers to the one in the British Isles. This may vary in other parts of the range.

Larvae can be found feeding on plant leaves during the night. They are typically located on the underside of the leaves of the host plant close to the ground. Larvae are gregarious feeders in their initial stages. In the fourth instar, the larvae may disperse to the other areas of the original host plant and may migrate to other host plants. When forming into pupae, the larvae will burrow into the soil where they will remain until they emerge as adults.

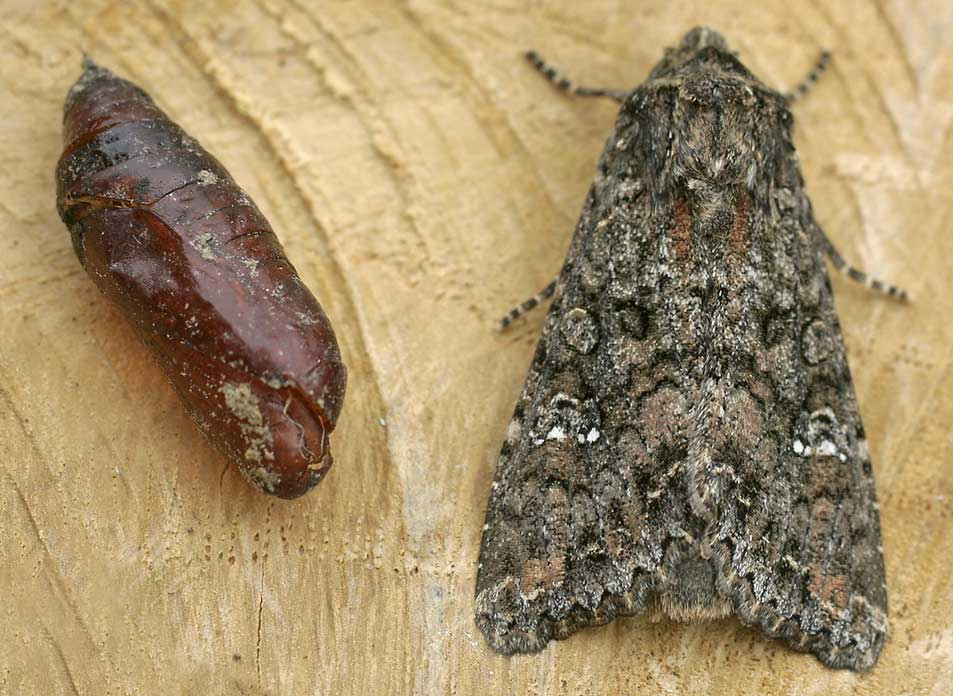

=== Pupae ===
The pupae are brown and glossy. Pupae can develop once or twice during the year, with pupation typically taking place over winter. Pupae develop within cocoons that are found in the soil. The pupae are generally 20 mm long. The pupae can be found in the ground anywhere from 2–10 mm deep into the soil.

=== Adults ===
Adult moths emerge from the pupae in soil during the months of May and June. Their appearance is similar to many moths within the same family; they are gray, black, green, or brown with delicate patterning of lines and spots across the entire adult body. The forewings tend to be darker than the hindwings in color. Characteristic markings of the species include a kidney shaped spot enclosed in a white border on the forewing of the adult. There is also a thin white border that goes around the entirety of the forewing. The wingspan ranges between 34–50 mm. Adult wingspan and body size are correlated with the nutritive status of the developing moth. Curved dorsal spurs located on the tibia of the forelegs distinguish this species from others very similar to it.

== Adult behavior ==
Adults emerge from the end of April through the beginning of June. Shortly after emerging, the adult moths mate, as discussed in more detail in the mating section. The moth is most active at night, when it flies between plants and feeds. During the day, the adult moth seeks cover under the foliage of surrounding plants.

== Mating ==
Mating in M. brassicae occurs among recently emerged adult moths. In one controlled observation, adults began mating the first night of emergence. In this observation, mating behavior started at ten in the evening, with most mating activity occurring after midnight. Mating pairs remained associated for upwards of twelve hours, with females covering male wings with the posterior of their body during this time. The pattern of mating is as follows:

=== Calling position ===
The females initiated the mating sequence. She does so by calling for the male which entails positioning her antennae forward, raising her wings horizontally, and flapping her wings quickly. If there is no male response to this call, the female relocates and repeats the calling behavior until she is able to successfully attract a male mate.

=== Reaction of the male ===
Upon hearing the call of the female, the male similarly points his antennae forward and begins to flap his wings rapidly. Then, the male takes off in flight to search for the calling female.

=== Approach of male ===
When the male locates the calling female, he approaches her and touches his antennae to her body as the first point of contact. This allows the male to confirm the identity of the calling female as belonging to the same species as itself. The male then moves towards the female and begins to flap its wings aggressively again. It then positions its abdomen towards the female's and opens his claspers to begin copulation.

=== Copulation ===
The female continues the calling as the male copulates with the female. The male must position his abdomen under the wing of the female during copulation. After copulation, the female will continue to mate. On average, a female will copulate 2.5 times.

== Oviposition ==
The female moth lays eggs singly, but clusters many of them onto the same surface. A female may group upwards of 350 eggs together on the underside of a leaf. Females lay around 2500 eggs after copulation. Eggs are generally laid from May to June, but there is variation between populations of the moth. The eggs hatch within five to twelve days. The incubation period is highly dependent on environmental factors, mainly temperature. The incubation ranges from six days at 25 °C to 12 days at lower temperatures.

Oviposition behavior has been studied comparing three different host plants: cabbage, tomatoes, and chrysanthemums. Females landed most often on tomato plants, but spent the most time on cabbage plants. Further, females were able to lay eggs more rapidly on cabbage plants and spent more time dragging their ovipositors on the leaves of the tomatoes before depositing their eggs. While the significance of these findings may not be fully understood, it demonstrates a keenness towards cabbage plants as preferred hosts for oviposition and that females must gauge host plant quality before depositing eggs on a given leaf. Preferences for plant species is also demonstrated, since few eggs were laid on chrysanthemums.

Another study was conducted to understand the influence of host plant damage on the host-finding behavior of female moths. Surprisingly, female moths of this species tend to preferentially select for damaged host plants for oviposition. This finding is rather surprising given that it would be expected that females would select for undamaged plants to help her offspring avoid resource competition with whatever species had already fed on the plant. However, researchers hypothesize that this may be due to the release of volatiles, to which females are attracted.

== Migration ==
A study of M. brassicae in East Asia demonstrated that the species is migratory. Researchers found that annual migration across a 40–60 km strait. Data also indicates that females migrate more than males, with a significantly higher proportion of captures being female compared to the population sex ratio during the months of May to September. Coupled with the finding that these migratory females had high ovarian development and mating rate during this time, researchers concluded that this migration promoted female sexual maturation prior to mating. This would allow females to mate and oviposit in their newly arrived upon territories.

== As a pest ==
The caterpillars are particularly damaging from the first to the fourth instars. During the first three instars, the larvae feed gregariously and may skeletonize the leaves upon with they were laid and migrate to. During the fourth instar, the larvae tend to burrow into the core of many fruits, vegetables, and plants rendering them unfit to sell commercially. Further, larvae leave waste excrements on the leaves of their chosen host plants which may devalue the plant even more by transmitting fungal and bacterial infection to the plant. Because of the irreparable damage to their host plants, these moths are treated largely as pests and species control practices are undertaken by those within the agricultural industry.

While there are limited means of chemically controlling the species, one method of population reduction has been the use of wasp species that parasitize the eggs of the cabbage moth. Various wasp species are known to parasitize cabbage moths at different stages of its life cycle, from egg to pupa. Controlled introduction of wasp species to fields has been able to effectively increase the rate of parasitism from just 15% to 93%, significantly reducing the population of cabbage moths in the field.

== Food resources ==
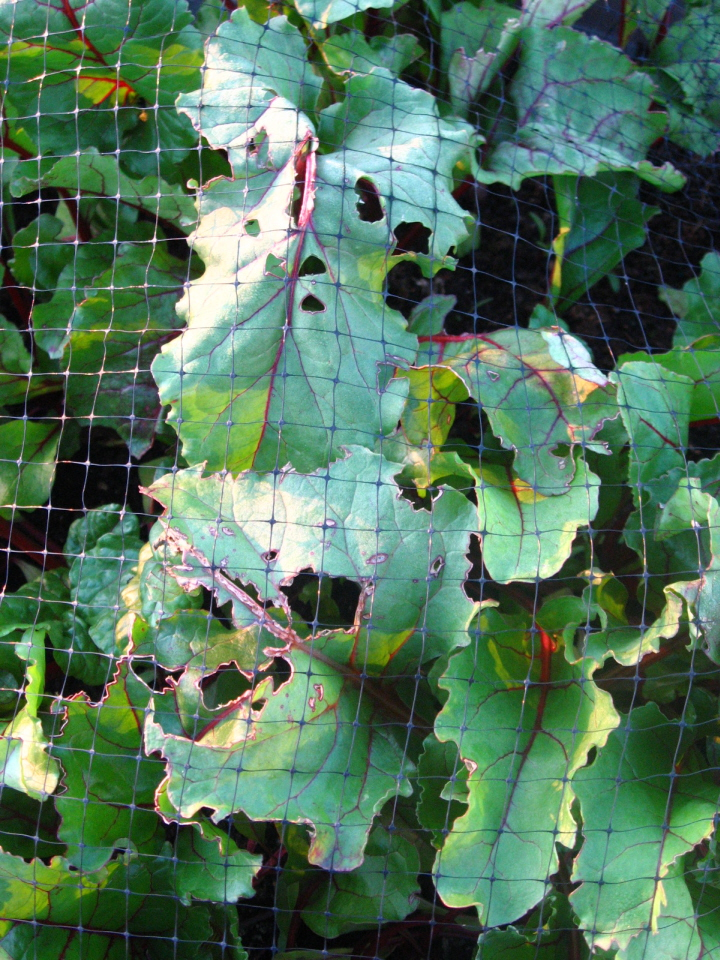
Beet greens with holes eaten by cabbage moth larvae

Here is a list of the known and recorded food plants for Mamestra brassicae:

- Allium – onion
- Aquilegia – columbine
- Beta – beet
- Brassica
- Bryonia – bryony
- Calendula – marigold
- Cannabis – marijuana
- Chrysanthemum
- Cucurbita
- Dianthus – carnation
- Helianthus – sunflower
- Hyoscyamus – henbane
- Hyssopus – hyssop
- Lactuca – lettuce
- Linum – flax
- Lychnis – Maltese cross
- Lycopersicon – tomato
- Malus – apple
- Nicotiana – tobacco
- Pisum – pea
- Plantago – plantain
- Raphanus – radish
- Rheum – rhubarb
- Rudbeckia
- Rumex
- Silene
- Solanum – potato
- Spinacia – spinach

See Robinson, G. S. et al.

== Citations ==
- Chinery, Michael Collins Guide to the Insects of Britain and Western Europe 1986 (Reprinted 1991)
- Skinner, Bernard The Colour Identification Guide to Moths of the British Isles 1984
