= Caldicellulosiruptor =

Scientific classification
- Domain: Bacteria
- Kingdom: Bacillati
- Phylum: Bacillota
- Class: Clostridia
- Order: Caldicellulosiruptorales; Chuvochina et al. 2024
- Family: Caldicellulosiruptoraceae; Chuvochina et al. 2024
- Genus: Caldicellulosiruptor; Sissons et al. 1987 ex Rainey et al. 1995

Type species
- Caldicellulosiruptor saccharolyticus Sissons et al. 1987 ex Rainey et al. 1995

Species
- See text

Synonyms
- "Anaerocellum" Svetlichnyi et al. 1990; "Caldocellum" Sissons et al. 1987

Genus of bacteria

Caldicellulosiruptor is a genus of thermophilic, anaerobic, Gram-positive, non-spore forming bacteria. Originally placed within the highly polyphyletic class Clostridia according to the NCBI and LPSN, it is now thought to lie outside of the Bacillota. Caldicellulosiruptor is known to degrade and ferment complex carbohydrates from plant matter, such as cellulose and hemicellulose (hence its name), and certain species in the genus have been identified as potential candidates for biofuel production.

== Phylogeny ==
The currently accepted taxonomy is based on the List of Prokaryotic names with Standing in Nomenclature (LPSN) and National Center for Biotechnology Information (NCBI).

16S rRNA based LTP_10_2024

- Caldicellulosiruptor
  - - C. changbaiensis
    - C. saccharolyticus
  - - - C. acetigenus
      - - C. kristjanssonii Bredholt et al. 1999
        - C. lactoaceticus Mladenovska et al. 1997
    - - C. bescii
      - - C. kronotskiensis
        - - C. hydrothermalis
          - - C. diazotrophicus
            - C. owensensis

120 marker proteins based GTDB 10-RS226

- Caldicellulosiruptor
  - - - C. changbaiensis Bing et al. 2015
      - C. saccharolyticus Rainey et al. 1995
    - - "C. morganii" Lee et al. 2018
      - "C. naganoensis" Lee et al. 2018
  - - - C. diazotrophicus Chen et al. 2021
      - - C. bescii Yang et al. 2010
        - C. kronotskiensis Miroshnichenko et al. 2008
    - - C. hydrothermalis Miroshnichenko et al. 2008
      - - - "C. obsidiansis" Hamilton-Brehm et al. 2010
          - C. owensensis Huang et al. 1998
        - - "C. danielii" Lee et al. 2018
          - C. acetigenus (Nielsen et al. 1994) Onyenwoke et al. 2006

== See also ==
- List of bacterial orders
- List of bacteria genera
