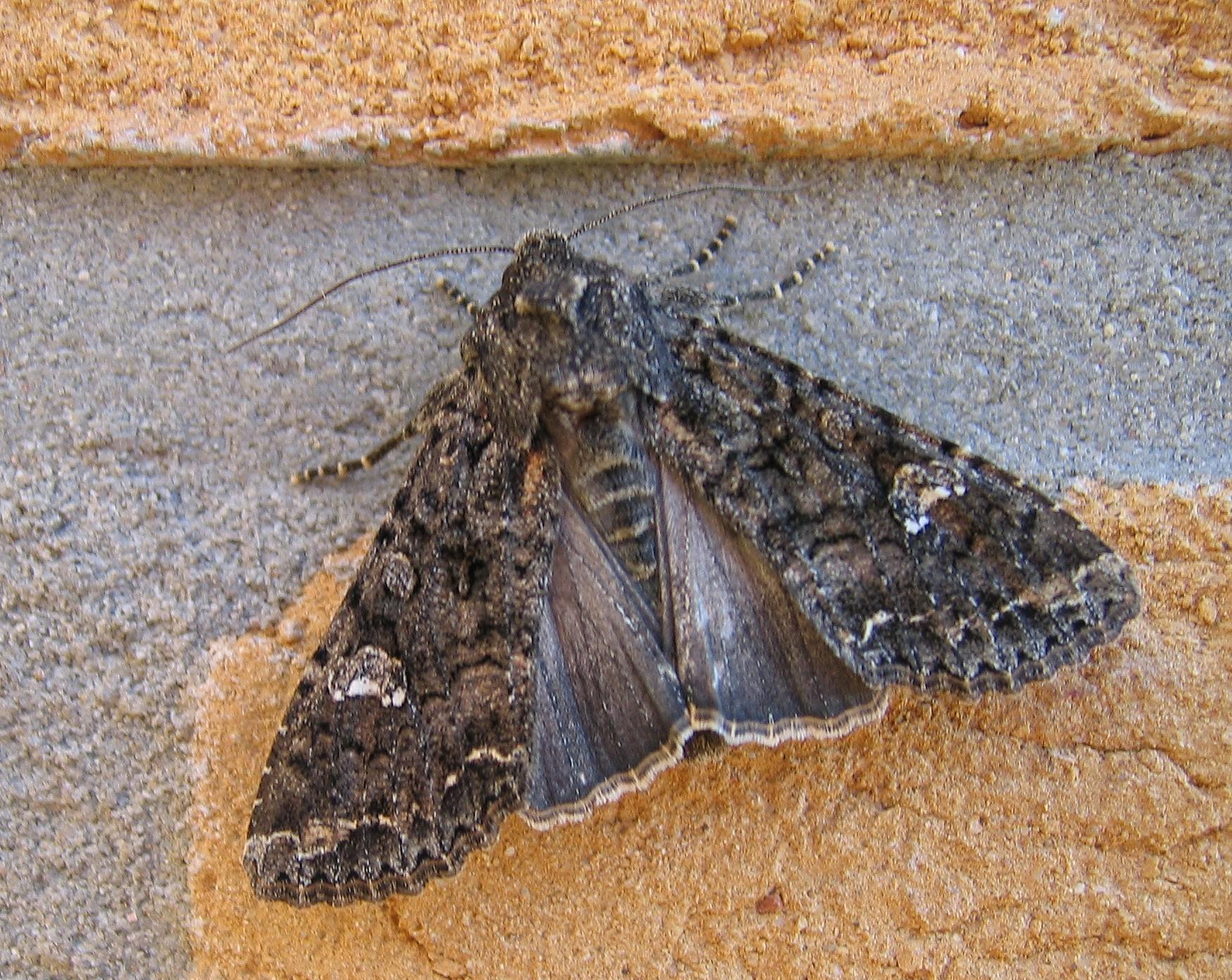
- Cabbage moth

Scientific classification
- Domain: Eukaryota
- Kingdom: Animalia
- Phylum: Arthropoda
- Class: Insecta
- Order: Lepidoptera
- Superfamily: Noctuoidea
- Family: Noctuidae
- Subfamily: Noctuinae
- Tribe: Hadenini
- Genus: Mamestra; Ochsenheimer, 1816

= Mamestra =

Genus of moths

Mamestra is a genus of moths of the family Noctuidae described by Ochsenheimer in 1816. Perhaps the best known species is the cabbage moth, M. brassicae.

== Species ==
- Mamestra brassicae (Linnaeus, 1758)
- Mamestra configurata Walker, 1856
- Mamestra curialis (Smith, 1888)
- Mamestra repentina Morrison, 1875
- Mamestra tayulingensis Yoshimoto, 1989
