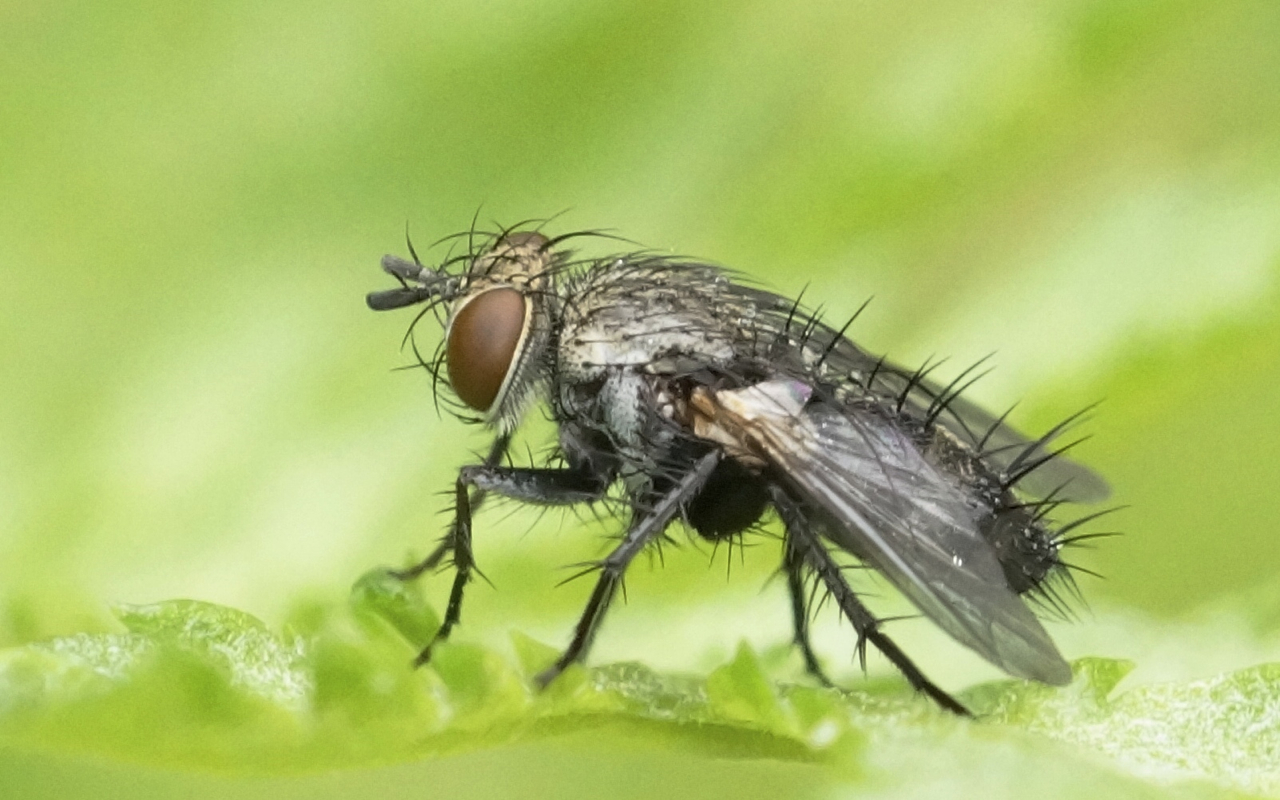
- Athrycia trepida

Scientific classification
- Kingdom: Animalia
- Phylum: Arthropoda
- Class: Insecta
- Order: Diptera
- Family: Tachinidae
- Subfamily: Dexiinae
- Tribe: Voriini
- Genus: Athrycia; Robineau-Desvoidy, 1830

Type species
- Athrycia erythrocera Robineau-Desvoidy, 1830

Synonyms
- Athricia Macquart, 1834; Athryciopsis Townsend, 1932; Blepharigena Rondani, 1856; Paraplagia Brauer & von Berganstamm, 1891

= Athrycia =

Genus of flies

Athrycia is a genus of flies in the family Tachinidae.

== Species ==
- Athrycia cinerea (Coquillett, 1895)
- Athrycia curvinervis (Zetterstedt, 1844)
- Athrycia impressa (Wulp, 1869)
- Athrycia longicornis Herting, 1973
- Athrycia trepida (Meigen, 1824)
