= Athrycia curvinervis =

Scientific classification
- Kingdom: Animalia
- Phylum: Arthropoda
- Class: Insecta
- Order: Diptera
- Family: Tachinidae
- Subfamily: Dexiinae
- Tribe: Voriini
- Genus: Athrycia
- Species: A. curvinervis

Binomial name
- Athrycia curvinervis (Zetterstedt, 1844)

Synonyms
- Tachina curvinervis Zetterstedt, 1844; Tachina ruficornis Zetterstedt, 1844

Species of fly

Athrycia curvinervis is a species of fly in the family Tachinidae.

== Distribution ==
British Isles, Czech Republic, Estonia, Hungary, Poland, Slovakia, Denmark, Finland, Norway, Sweden, Italy, Austria, Belgium, Germany, Netherlands, Switzerland, Japan, China, Russia.
