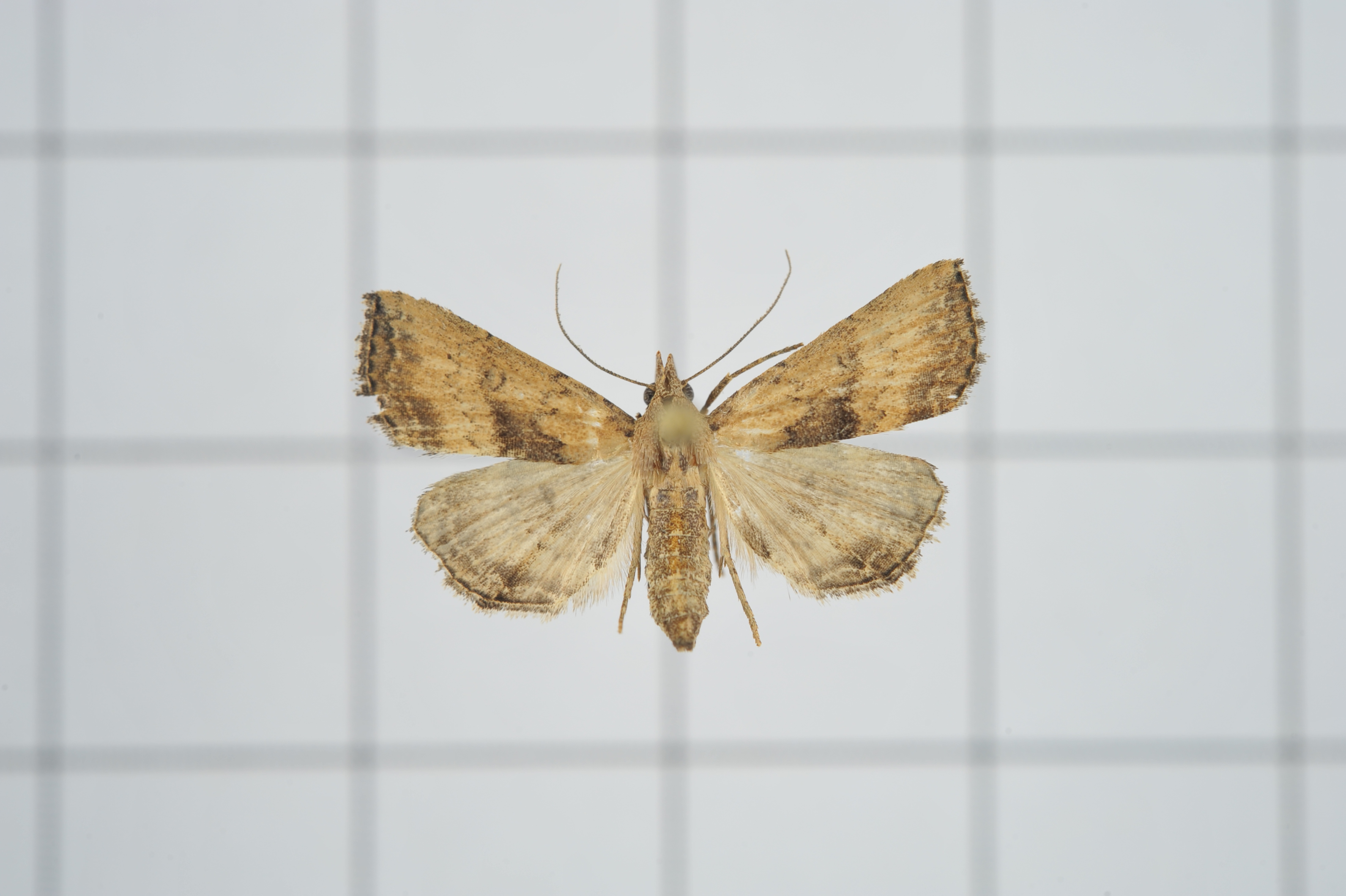

Scientific classification
- Domain: Eukaryota
- Kingdom: Animalia
- Phylum: Arthropoda
- Class: Insecta
- Order: Lepidoptera
- Superfamily: Noctuoidea
- Family: Erebidae
- Genus: Progonia
- Species: P. kurosawai

Binomial name
- Progonia kurosawai Owada, 1987

= Progonia kurosawai =

Species of moth

Progonia kurosawai is a moth of the family Noctuidae first described by Owada in 1987. It is found in Japan, Sri Lanka, Taiwan, Nepal, Myanmar, Borneo and Sulawesi.

Forewings narrow and brownish with a darker border. Reniform kidney shaped. Dark, very fine, crenulate antemedial and postmedial lines present. Hindwings pale, straw coloured with a darker, dull brown border.

== Gallery ==
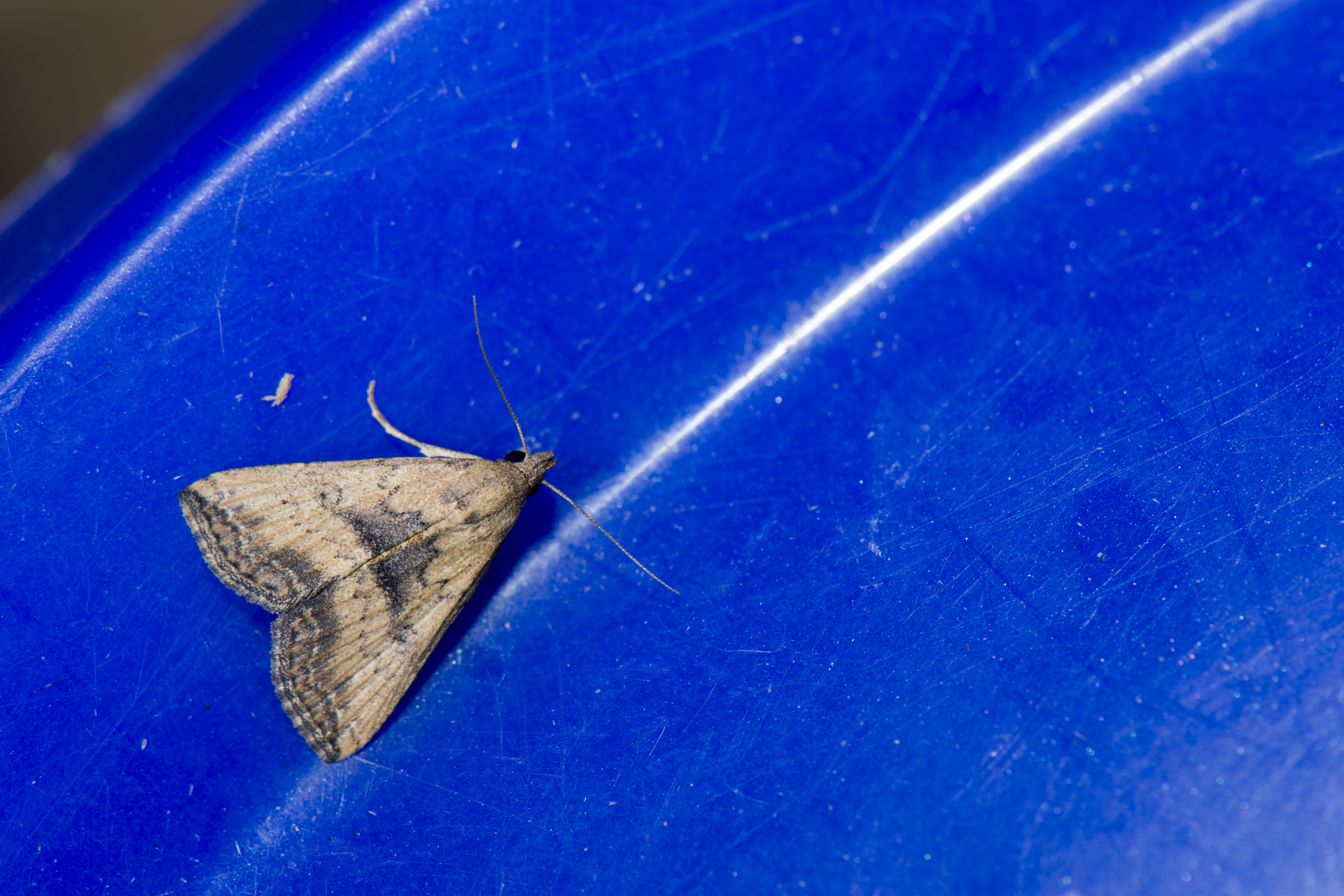

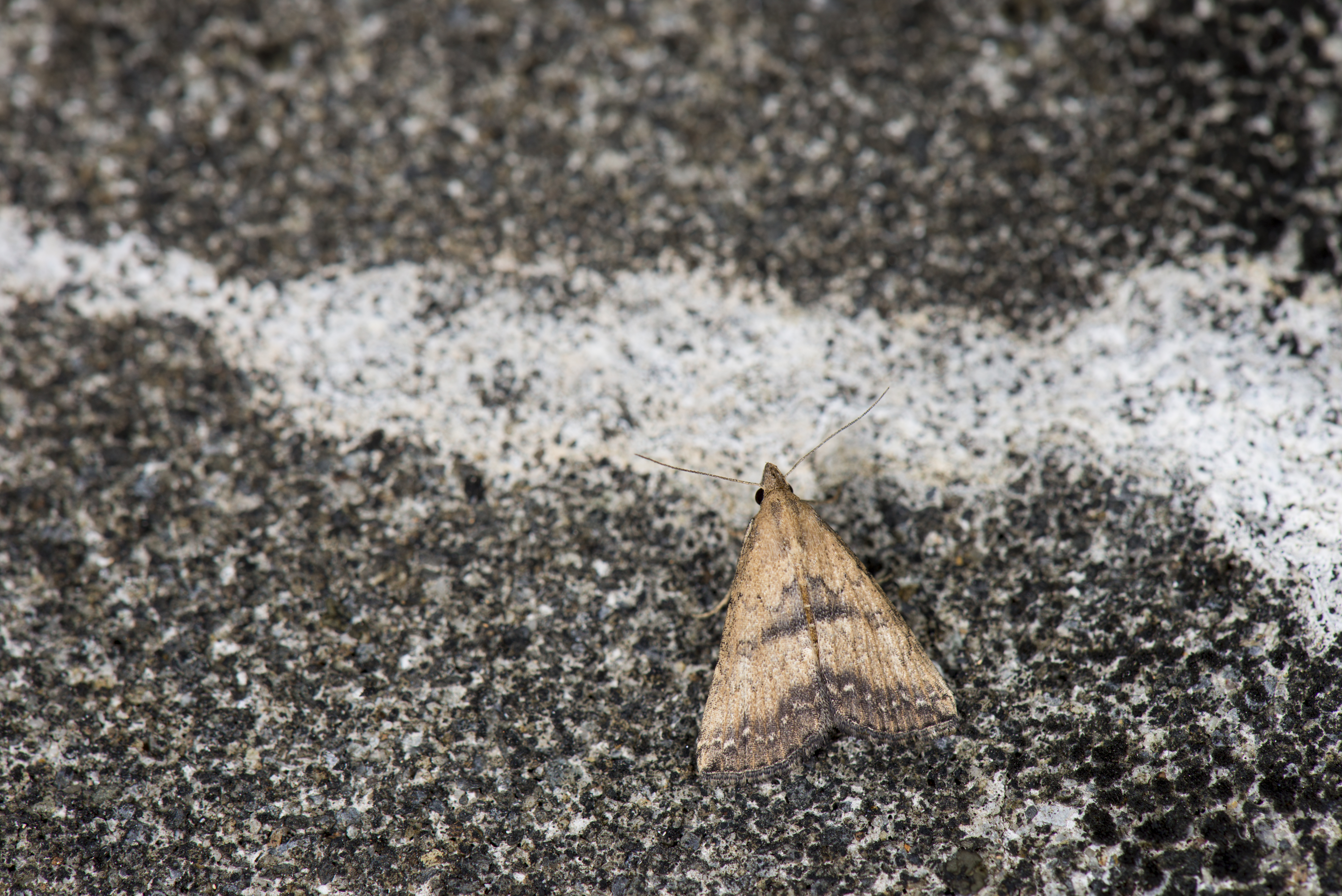
