= Dargida aleada =

Scientific classification
- Domain: Eukaryota
- Kingdom: Animalia
- Phylum: Arthropoda
- Class: Insecta
- Order: Lepidoptera
- Superfamily: Noctuoidea
- Family: Noctuidae
- Tribe: Hadenini
- Genus: Dargida
- Species: D. aleada

Binomial name
- Dargida aleada Smith, 1908

Species of moth

Dargida aleada is a species of cutworm or dart moth in the family Noctuidae. It is found in North America.

The MONA or Hodges number for Dargida aleada is 10435.
