= Athrycia impressa =

Scientific classification
- Kingdom: Animalia
- Phylum: Arthropoda
- Class: Insecta
- Order: Diptera
- Family: Tachinidae
- Subfamily: Dexiinae
- Tribe: Voriini
- Genus: Athrycia
- Species: A. impressa

Binomial name
- Athrycia impressa (Wulp, 1869)

Synonyms
- Plagia impressa Wulp, 1869

Species of fly

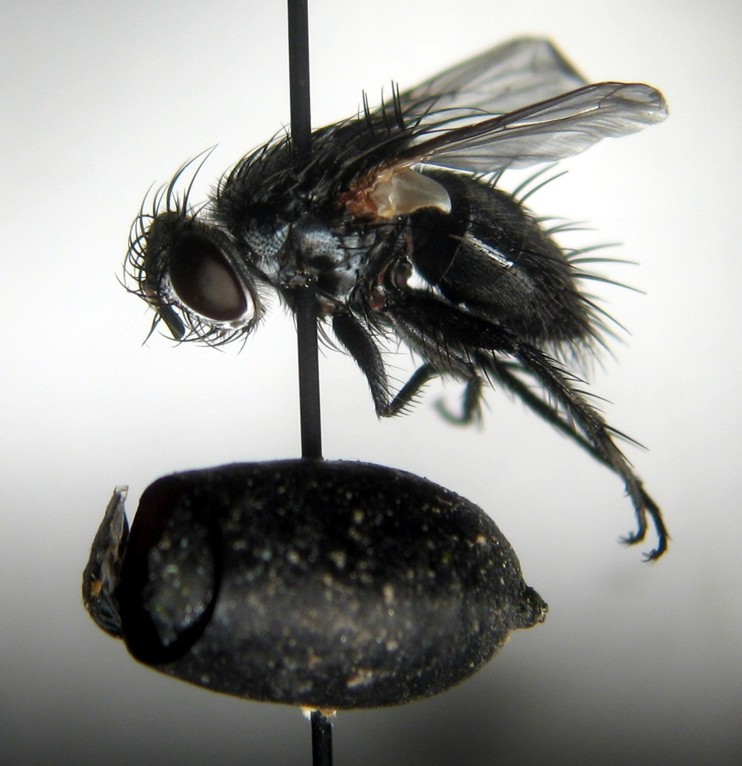

Athrycia impressa is a species of fly in the family Tachinidae.

== Distribution ==
Turkmenistan, British Isles, Czech Republic, Hungary, Lithuania, Poland, Romania, Slovakia, Ukraine, Denmark, Norway, Sweden, Bulgaria, Greece, Italy, Portugal, Serbia, Spain, Turkey, Austria, France, Germany, Netherlands, Switzerland, Mongolia, Russia, China, Transcaucasia.
