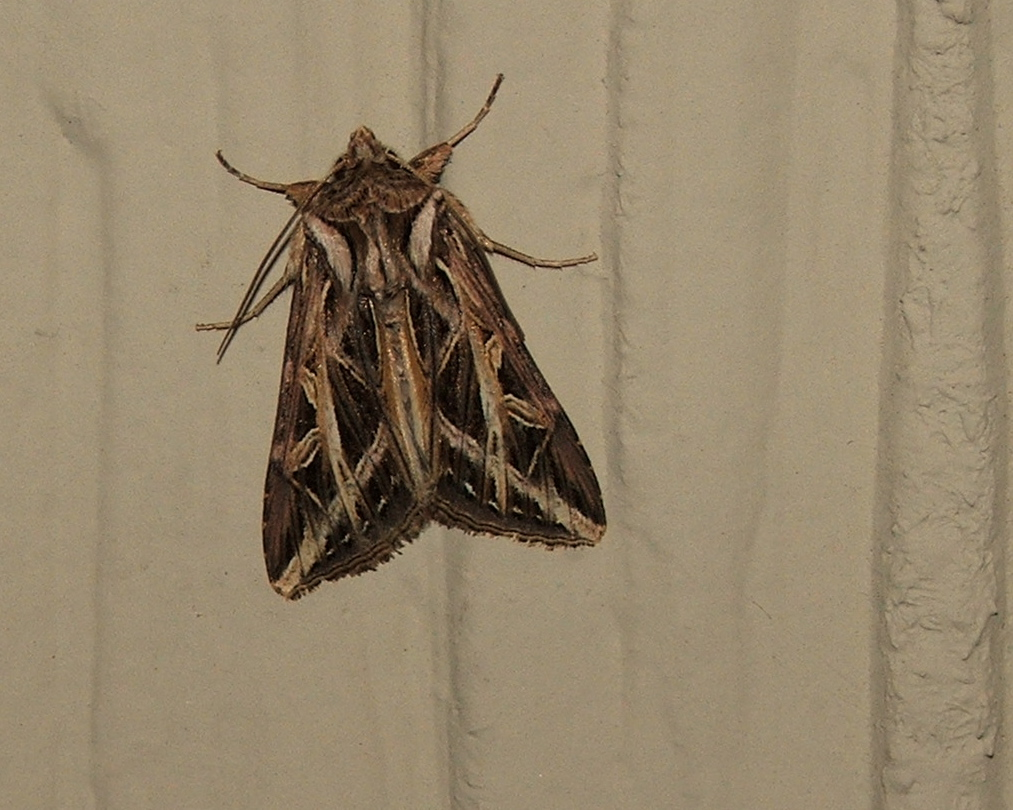

Scientific classification
- Kingdom: Animalia
- Phylum: Arthropoda
- Clade: Pancrustacea
- Class: Insecta
- Order: Lepidoptera
- Superfamily: Noctuoidea
- Family: Noctuidae
- Genus: Dargida
- Species: D. procinctus

Binomial name
- Dargida procinctus Grote, 1873

Synonyms
- Dargida procincta; Eupsephopaectes procinctus

= Dargida procinctus =

Species of moth

Dargida procinctus, the olive green cutworm or girdler moth, is a species of moth of the family Noctuidae. It is found from Wisconsin and Manitoba to British Columbia, south to California and Arizona.

The wingspan is about 40 mm. The moth flies from August to September in the north, but much earlier in the southern parts of its range.

The larvae feed on various grasses, primarily Phalaris arundinacea.
