= Caldicellulosiruptor saccharolyticus =

Scientific classification
- Domain: Bacteria
- Kingdom: Bacillati
- Phylum: Bacillota
- Class: Clostridia
- Order: Caldicellulosiruptorales
- Family: Caldicellulosiruptoraceae
- Genus: Caldicellulosiruptor
- Species: C. saccharolyticus

Binomial name
- Caldicellulosiruptor saccharolyticus Rainey et al., 1995

Species of bacterium

Caldicellulosiruptor saccharolyticus is a species of thermophilic, anaerobic cellulolytic bacterium. It was isolated from a piece of wood floating in the flow from a freshwater thermal spring in New Zealand in 1987, and tentatively named Caldocellum saccharolyticum. In 1994, the isolate was more thoroughly characterized physiologically, and classified to a new genus, Caldicellusiruptor, based on 16S RNA sequence. It is the type species, and more thoroughly studied member of its genus.
