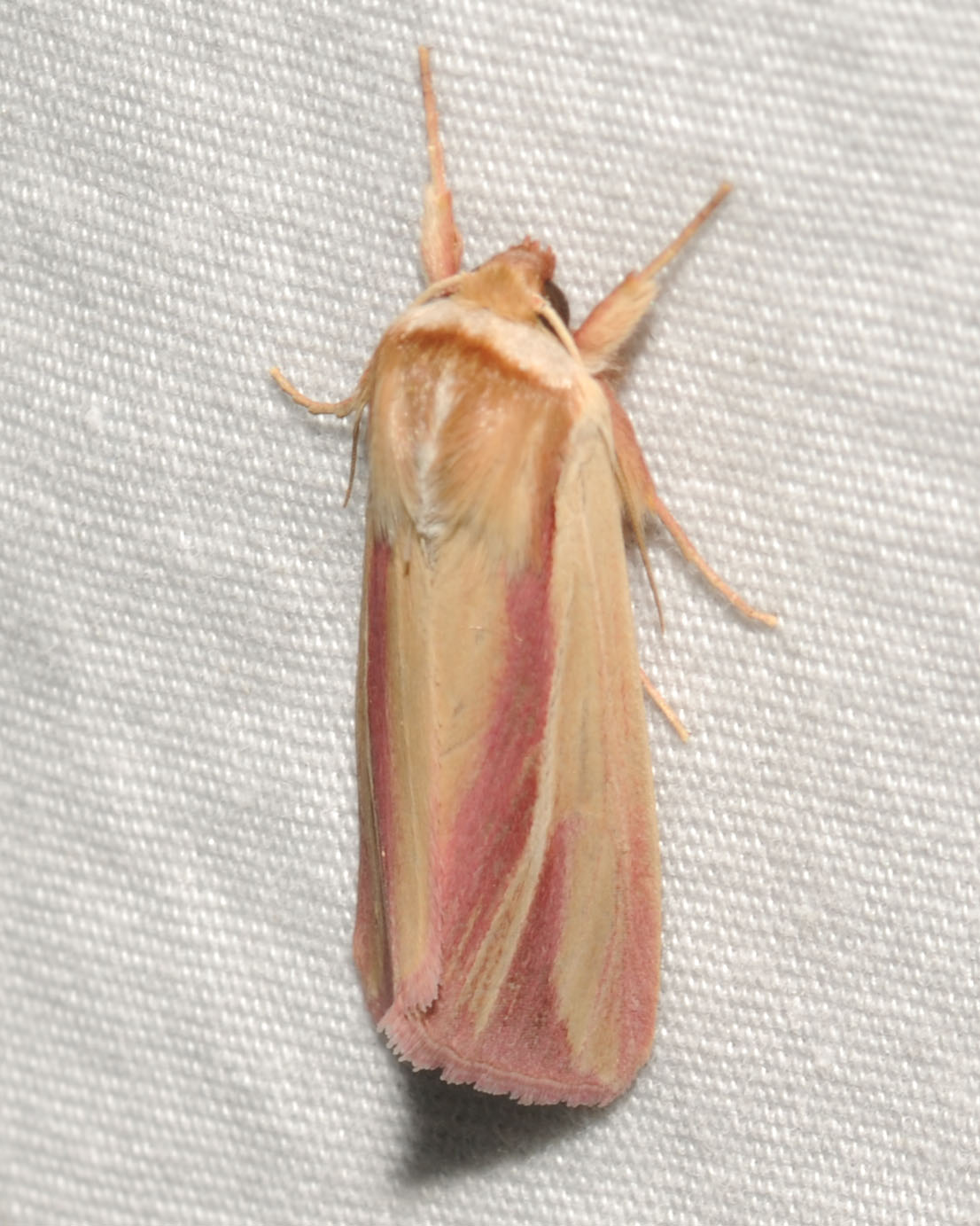

Scientific classification
- Kingdom: Animalia
- Phylum: Arthropoda
- Class: Insecta
- Order: Lepidoptera
- Superfamily: Noctuoidea
- Family: Noctuidae
- Tribe: Hadenini
- Genus: Dargida; Walker, 1856

Synonyms
- Faronta

= Dargida =

Genus of moths

Dargida is a genus of moths of the family Noctuidae.

== Species ==
- Dargida acanthus (Herrich-Schäffer, [1869])
- Dargida acca (Herrich-Schäffer, [1869])
- Dargida albifluviata (Druce, 1905)
- Dargida albilinea (Hübner, [1821])
- Dargida albistriga (Druce, 1908)
- Dargida albomarginata (Druce, 1898)
- Dargida albostriata (Druce, 1911)
- Dargida aleada Smith, 1908
- Dargida amoena (Draudt, 1924)
- Dargida calographa (Maassen, 1890)
- Dargida clavifera (Hampson, 1909)
- Dargida clavisigna (Hampson, 1913)
- Dargida confundibilis Köhler, 1973
- Dargida diffusa (Walker, 1856)
- Dargida dissentanea (Draudt, 1924)
- Dargida disticta (Druce, 1908)
- Dargida egregia (Draudt, 1924)
- Dargida elaeistis (Druce, 1905)
- Dargida eugrapha (Hampson, 1909)
- Dargida exoul (Walker, 1856)
- Dargida faeculenta (Draudt, 1924)
- Dargida fluminalis (Dognin, 1911)
- Dargida ganeo (Draudt, 1924)
- Dargida graminea Schaus, 1894
- Dargida grammivora Walker, 1856
- Dargida gumia (Draudt, 1924)
- Dargida hieroglyphera (Maassen, 1890)
- Dargida imitata (Maassen, 1890)
- Dargida jucunda (Maassen, 1890)
- Dargida jucundissima (Zerny, 1916)
- Dargida leucoceps (Hampson, 1913)
- Dargida melanoleuca (Druce, 1908)
- Dargida meridionalis (Hampson, 1905)
- Dargida mesotoma (Hampson, 1909)
- Dargida multistria (Köhler, 1947)
- Dargida napali (Köhler, 1959)
- Dargida nectaristis (Draudt, 1924)
- Dargida oenistis (Druce, 1905)
- Dargida polygona (Hampson, 1905)
- Dargida procinctus – olive green cutworm (Grote, 1873)
- Dargida quadrannulata (Morrison, 1875)
- Dargida resputa (Draudt, 1924)
- Dargida rubripennis (Grote & Robinson, 1870)
- Dargida scripta (Maassen, 1890)
- Dargida terrapictalis Buckett, 1967, [1969]
- Dargida tetera (Smith, 1902)
- Dargida tridens (Köhler, 1947)
- Dargida uncifera (Maassen, 1890)
- Dargida uncisigna (Hampson, 1913)
- Dargida violascens (Maassen, 1890)
