= Athrycia longicornis =

Scientific classification
- Kingdom: Animalia
- Phylum: Arthropoda
- Class: Insecta
- Order: Diptera
- Family: Tachinidae
- Subfamily: Dexiinae
- Tribe: Voriini
- Genus: Athrycia
- Species: A. longicornis

Binomial name
- Athrycia longicornis Herting, 1973

Species of fly

Athrycia longicornis is a species of fly in the family Tachinidae.

== Distribution ==
Russia, Mongolia.
