= Dargida tetera =

Scientific classification
- Domain: Eukaryota
- Kingdom: Animalia
- Phylum: Arthropoda
- Class: Insecta
- Order: Lepidoptera
- Superfamily: Noctuoidea
- Family: Noctuidae
- Tribe: Hadenini
- Genus: Dargida
- Species: D. tetera

Binomial name
- Dargida tetera (Smith, 1902)

Species of moth

Dargida tetera is a species of cutworm or dart moth in the family Noctuidae.

The MONA or Hodges number for Dargida tetera is 10433.
