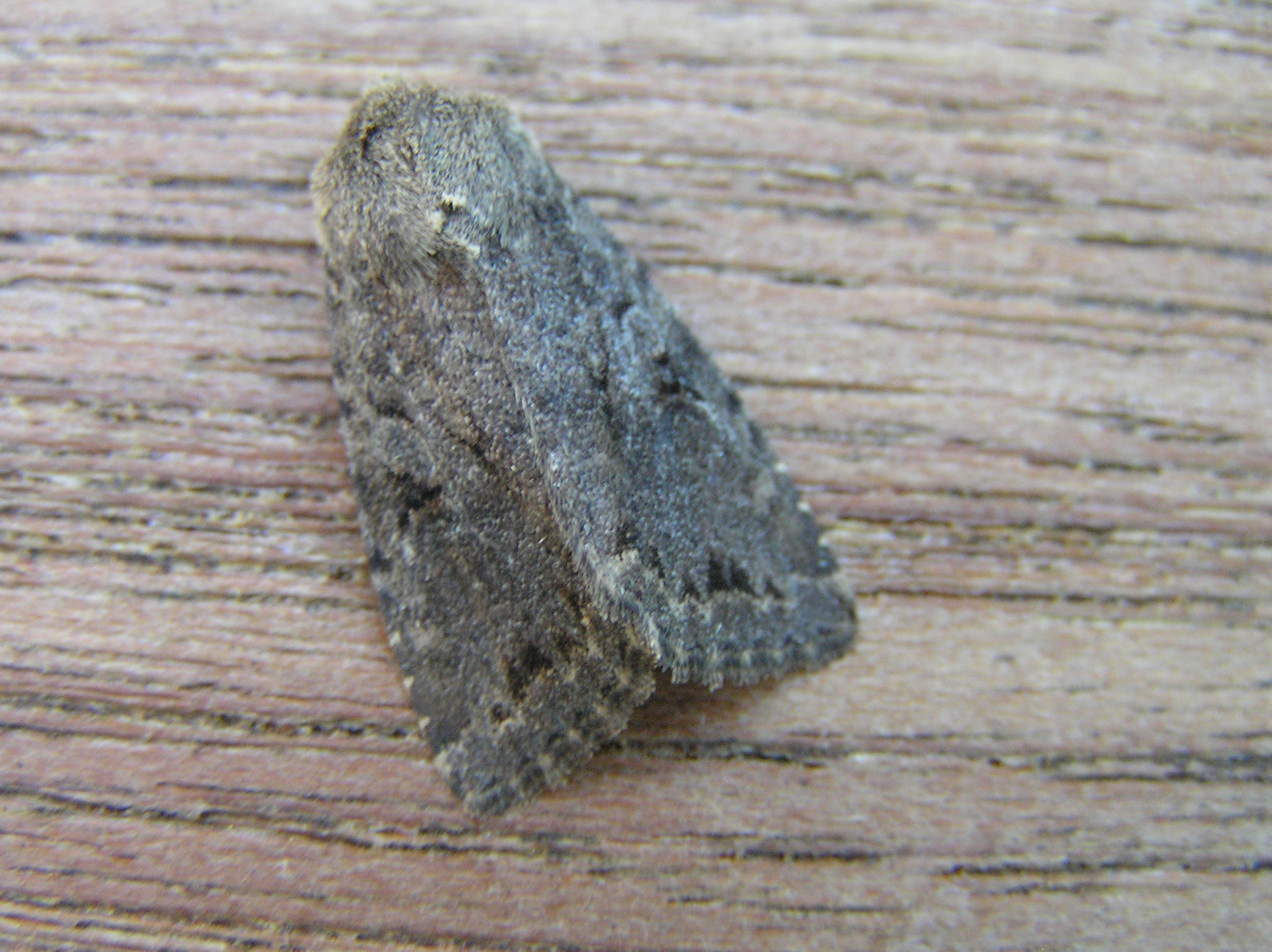

Scientific classification
- Kingdom: Animalia
- Phylum: Arthropoda
- Clade: Pancrustacea
- Class: Insecta
- Order: Lepidoptera
- Superfamily: Noctuoidea
- Family: Noctuidae
- Genus: Fissipunctia
- Species: F. ypsillon

Binomial name
- Fissipunctia ypsillon (Denis & Schiffermüller, 1775)

Synonyms
- Enargia ypsillon; Parastichtis ypsillon; Noctua ypsillon; Noctua fissipuncta; Dyschorista plebeja; Sidemia glaisi; Apterogenum ypsillon

= Fissipunctia ypsillon =

Species of moth

Fissipunctia ypsillon, the dingy shears, is a species of moth of the family Noctuidae. It is found in the Palearctic realm (Europe, Morocco, Algeria, Turkey, Russia, Caucasus, Transcaucasia, Iraq, Iran, Afghanistan, Siberia, and the Russian Far East).

== Description ==
The wingspan is 32–42 mm. The length of the forewings is 15–19 mm. Forewing grey, dusted with blackish, and with more or less reddish brown suffusion; a dark streak from base below cell; inner and outer lines pale, very obscure; submarginal line pale, distinct, generally preceded by dark marks; stigmata of the ground colour, the cell dark fuscous; claviform long, pointed, often followed by two black streaks to outer line; orbicular irregular in shape, often elongate below and touching reniform; hindwing fuscous, often paler towards base; the rarer grey form, with very sparse rufous suffusion represents the type; the commoner rufous-suffused examples are corticea Esp.; ab. nigrescens Tutt is a rare form with blackish forewings; variegata Tutt is purplish blackish; the costa marked with a series of short black streaks; orbicular and upper part of reniform pale, likewise the claviform; veins pale, the intervals of the dark ground colour, giving a striated appearance; all the lines pale; — ab. conjuncta ab. nov. [Warren] is; purplish fuscous, the veins and stigmatal annuli whitish, the upper stigmata strongly conjoined: — in orenburghensis Bartel the ground colour is whitish grey, the darker shades rufous grey, especially the cell; the orbicular stigma large, whitish grey, prolonged below to touch the reniform, which is dark with a pale ring; the space beyond it rufous grey with the veins pale across it; below the median vein the claviform stigma and the area within the median shade are also pale grey; hindwing with basal half paler, showing a dark cellspot and outer line. The larva is brown, sometimes inclining to reddish marked with black above, and the under surface is paler; there are three pale lines along the back, and one low down along each side. The head is pale brown freckled with darker brown.

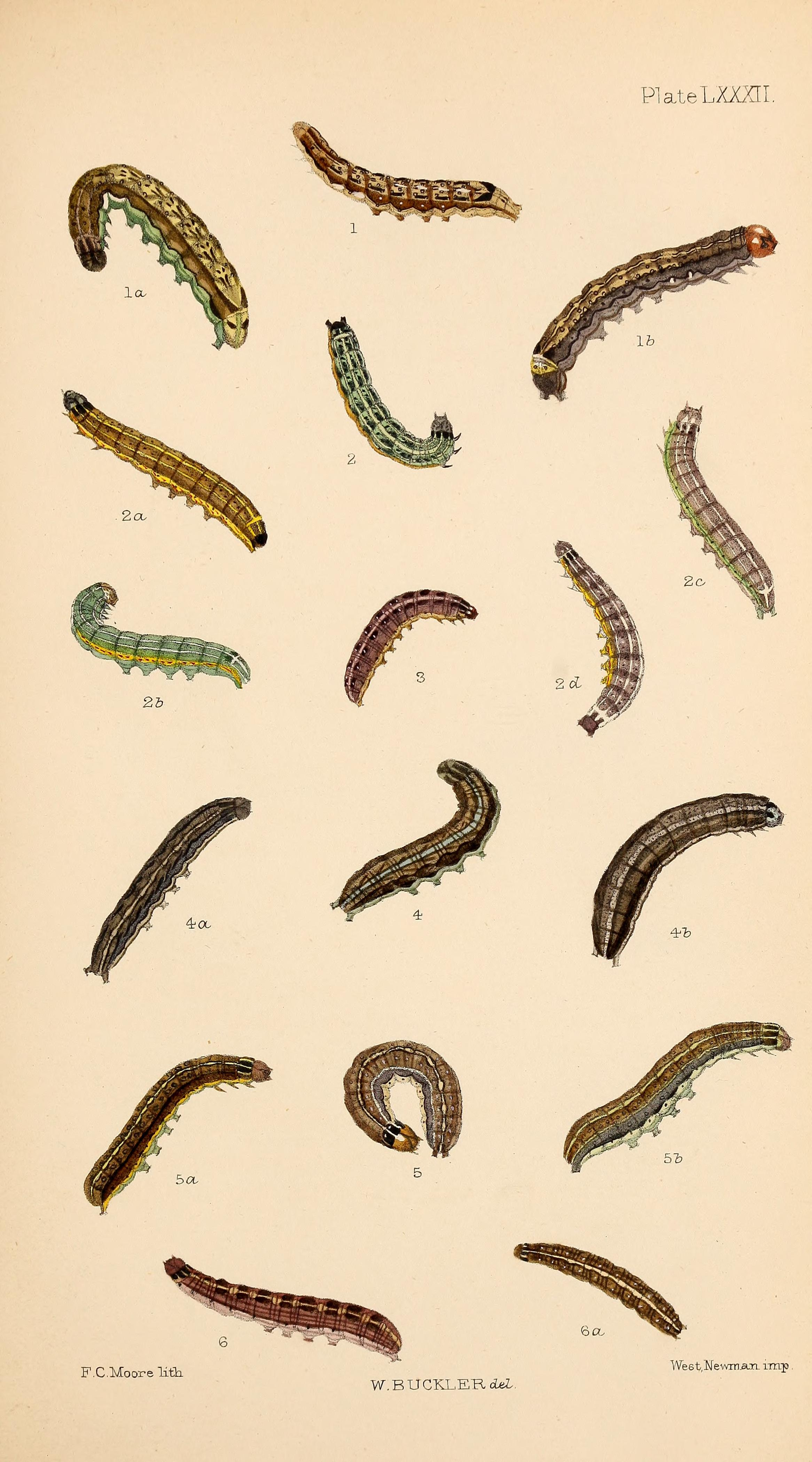
Figs 4, 4a, 4 b larvae in various stages

== Biology ==
The moth flies from June to August depending on the location.

The larvae feed on willow and poplar.
