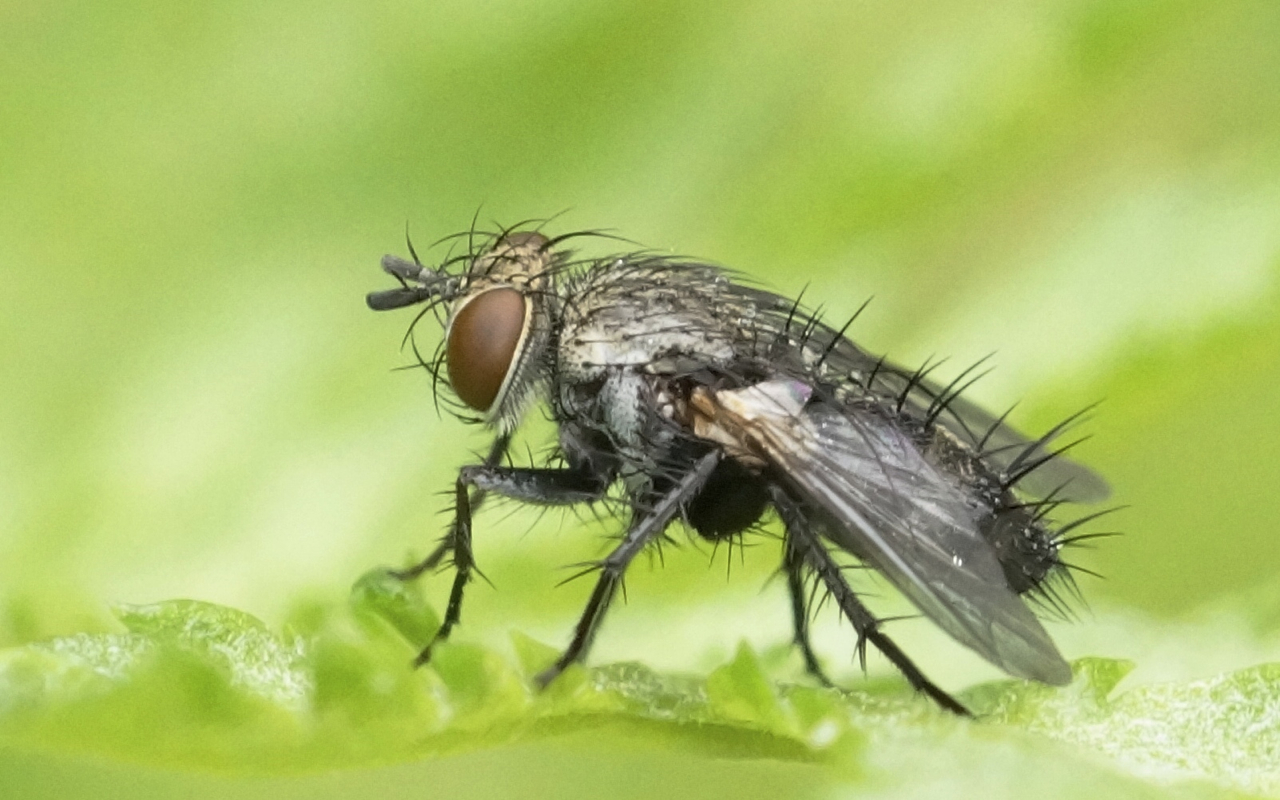

Scientific classification
- Kingdom: Animalia
- Phylum: Arthropoda
- Class: Insecta
- Order: Diptera
- Family: Tachinidae
- Subfamily: Dexiinae
- Tribe: Voriini
- Genus: Athrycia
- Species: A. trepida

Binomial name
- Athrycia trepida (Meigen, 1824)

Synonyms
- Athrycia erythrocera Robineau-Desvoidy, 1830; Athrycia flavipalpis Robineau-Desvoidy, 1863; Athrycia vulgaris Robineau-Desvoidy, 1863; Blepharigena rufipalpis Rondani, 1865; Tachina subcincta Zetterstedt, 1844; Tachina trepida Meigen, 1824

= Athrycia trepida =

Species of fly

Athrycia trepida is a species of fly in the family Tachinidae.

== Distribution ==
Turkmenistan, British Isles, Belarus, Czech Republic, Estonia, Hungary, Latvia, Lithuania, Moldova, Poland, Romania, Slovakia, Ukraine, Denmark, Finland, Norway, Sweden, Bulgaria, Croatia, Greece, Italy, Portugal, Serbia, Slovenia, Spain, Turkey, Austria, Belgium, France, Germany, Netherlands, Switzerland, Japan, Iran, Israel, Palestine, China, Mongolia, Russia.
