= Mamestra curialis =

Scientific classification
- Kingdom: Animalia
- Phylum: Arthropoda
- Clade: Pancrustacea
- Class: Insecta
- Order: Lepidoptera
- Superfamily: Noctuoidea
- Family: Noctuidae
- Genus: Mamestra
- Species: M. curialis

Binomial name
- Mamestra curialis Smith, 1887

Species of moth

Mamestra curialis, the scripted arches, is a moth in the family Noctuidae (owlet moths) described by John Bernhard Smith in 1887. It is found in North America.

The MONA or Hodges number for Mamestra curialis is 10272.
