= Facidia =

Scientific classification
- Kingdom: Animalia
- Phylum: Arthropoda
- Class: Insecta
- Order: Lepidoptera
- Superfamily: Noctuoidea
- Family: Erebidae
- Subfamily: Calpinae
- Genus: Facidia; Walker, 1865

Synonyms
- Megacephalomana Strand, 1943; Megacephalon Saalmüller, 1880

Genus of moths

Facidia is a genus of moths of the family Erebidae. The genus was erected by Francis Walker in 1865.

== Species ==
- Facidia divisa Walker, 1865
- Facidia laportei Berio, 1975
- Facidia luteilinea Hampson, 1926 Nigeria
- Facidia megastigma Herrich-Schäffer, 1854
- Facidia pilosum Pagenstecher, 1888
- Facidia remaudi Laporte, 1972
- Facidia rivulosum Saalmüller, 1880
- Facidia saalmuelleri Viette, 1965
- Facidia stygium Saalmüller, 1881
- Facidia vacillans (Walker, 1858) Gabon, Ghana, South Africa
