= Freilla =

Scientific classification
- Domain: Eukaryota
- Kingdom: Animalia
- Phylum: Arthropoda
- Class: Insecta
- Order: Lepidoptera
- Superfamily: Noctuoidea
- Family: Erebidae
- Subfamily: Calpinae
- Genus: Freilla; H. Druce in Godman & Salvin, 1890

Genus of moths

Freilla is a genus of moths of the family Erebidae. The genus was erected by Herbert Druce in 1890.

== Species ==
- Freilla abjecta Schaus, 1912 Guyana
- Freilla abluta Schaus, 1912 French Guiana
- Freilla conjuncta (Möschler, 1889) Suriname
- Freilla humeralis H. Druce, 1890 Mexico, Guatemala, Panama
- Freilla rufipuncta Hampson, 1926 Peru
- Freilla variabilis H. Druce, 1890 Mexico
