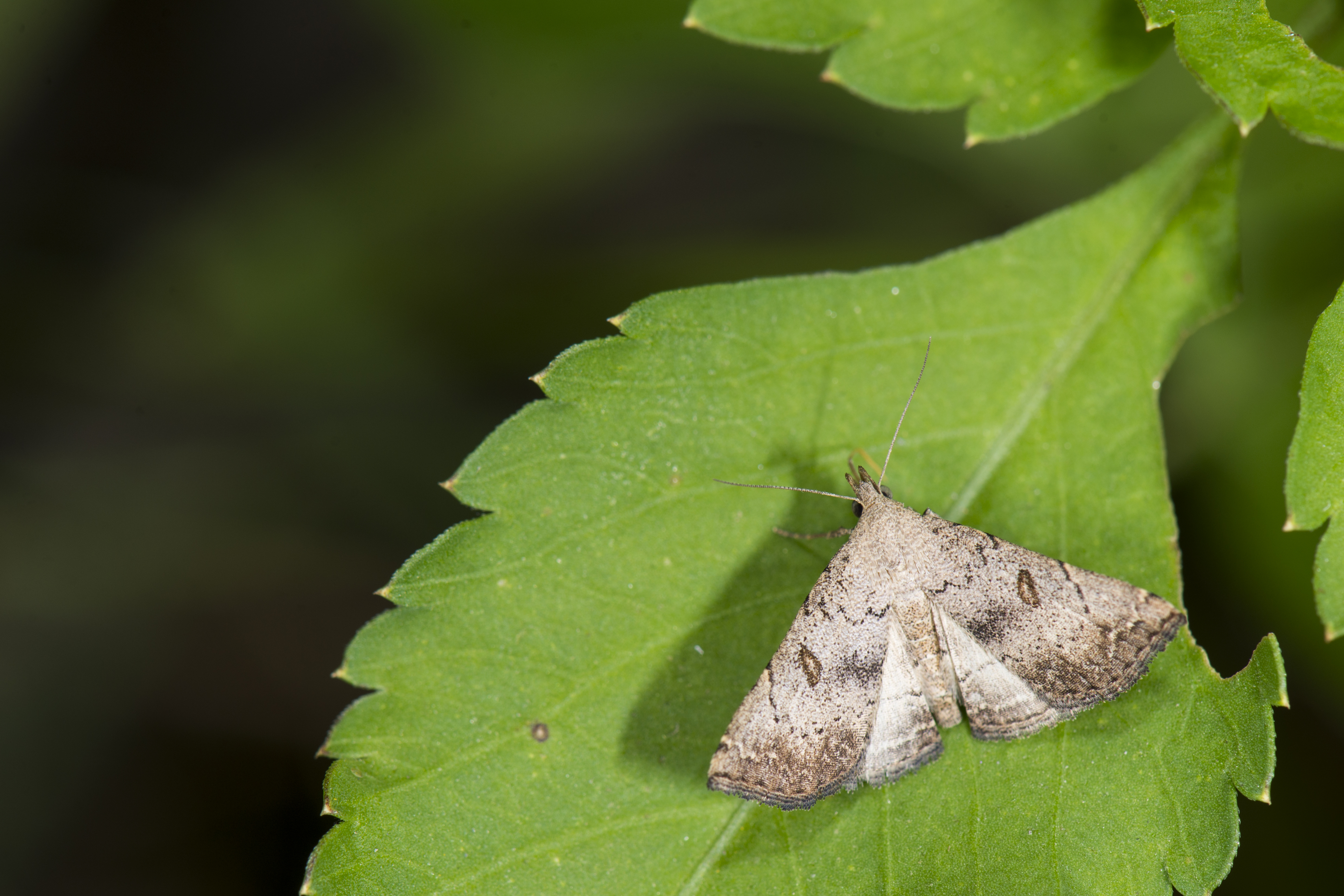
- Progonia olieusalis

Scientific classification
- Kingdom: Animalia
- Phylum: Arthropoda
- Class: Insecta
- Order: Lepidoptera
- Superfamily: Noctuoidea
- Family: Erebidae
- Subfamily: Herminiinae
- Genus: Progonia; Hampson, 1896

Synonyms
- Fautaua Collenette, 1928

= Progonia =

Genus of moths

Progonia is a genus of moths of the family Erebidae. The genus was erected by George Hampson in 1896.

== Species ==
Some species of this genus are:

- Progonia acutivalva Holloway, 2008 Borneo
- Progonia aenicta D. S. Fletcher, 1961 Uganda
- Progonia boisduvalalis Viette, 1961 Madagascar
- Progonia brunnealis (Wileman & South, 1916) Taiwan
- Progonia diagonalis (Collenette, 1928) Tahiti
- Progonia erectivalva Holloway, 2008 Borneo
- Progonia fonteialis (Walker, 1859) Borneo, Sulawesi
- Progonia grisea (Hampson, 1905) southern Africa
- Progonia innupta (Collenette, 1928) Tahiti
- Progonia kurosawai Owada, 1987 Japan, Sri Lanka, Nepal, Myanmar, Borneo, Sulawesi
- Progonia luctuosa (Hampson, 1902) southern Africa
- Progonia matilei Orhant, 2001
- Progonia oileusalis (Walker, [1859]) Borneo, India, Sri Lanka, Taiwan, Japan (Ryukyu Islands), Philippines
- Progonia perarcuata (Hampson, 1902)
- Progonia serrativalva Holloway, 2008 Borneo
- Progonia spodopa D. S. Fletcher, 1957 Solomon Islands
- Progonia umbrifera (Lucas, 1894) Queensland, New Caledonia, Vanuatu, Fiji, Samoa, Tonga
