= Caldicellulosiruptor bescii =

Scientific classification
- Domain: Bacteria
- Kingdom: Bacillati
- Phylum: Bacillota
- Class: Clostridia
- Order: Caldicellulosiruptorales
- Family: Caldicellulosiruptoraceae
- Genus: Caldicellulosiruptor
- Species: C. bescii

Binomial name
- Caldicellulosiruptor bescii Yang et al, 2010

Species of bacterium

Caldicellulosiruptor bescii is a species of thermophilic, anaerobic cellulolytic bacteria. It was isolated from a geothermally heated freshwater pool in the Valley of Geysers on the Kamchatka Peninsula in Russia in 1990. The species was originally named Anaerocellum thermophilum, but reclassified in 2010, based on genomic data.

== Biofuel production ==
Caldicellulosiruptor bescii is commonly used to generate microbiofuel. Although growth at temperatures up to 85 degrees Celsius have been noted, the optimum growth temperature is 75 degrees Celsius. C. bescii was originally grouped in the Anaerocellum thermophilum because of growth physiology, cell wall type and morphology. 16S rRNA sequencing later showed distinguishable differences that are responsible for placement in the Caldicellulosiruptor clade. C. besci is a Gram-positive, rod-shaped bacterium notable for its ability use a variety of polymeric carbohydrates and di- and monosaccharides to produce H_{2}, acetate, lactate, and trace amounts of ethanol.

Caldicellulosiruptor bescii has been selected for study by Oak Ridge National Laboratory and the University of Georgia's Department of Genetics for its ability to degrade cellulose. Through plasmid recombination the region for the gene encoding production of lactate dehydrogenase has been deleted causing the microbe to produce elevated levels of acetate and H2. Bi-functional acetaldehyde/alcohol dehydrogenase genes from Clostridium thermocellum allow for the conversion of sugars to ethanol. This genetically modified strain is able to convert biomass composed of switch-grass to ethanol.

== Diversity ==
Caldicellulosiruptor bescii has the highest growth temperature out of nine different isolates in the genus of Caldicellulosiruptor. It can grow at temperatures up to 90°C with an optimum growth temperature of 75°C. In 1990, C. bescii was described formally and the type strain was deposited as DSM 6725. Shortly after, C. bescii was classified as a member of a new genus Anaerocellum and named Anaerocellum thermophilum, strain Z-1320. Studies were conducted to compare and contrast the strains. A study on the DSM 6725 strain with hemicellulose, cellulose and pectin showed notable differences compared to what was reported with strain Z-1320. The tests showed that DSM 6725 was able to grow on pectin and xylose, while it was previously shown that strain Z-1320 could not utilize xylose and pectin. Another notable difference was in the growth temperature of DSM 6725. DSM 6725 strain could grow up to 90°C while Z-1320 can grow up to 83°C. These differences in the strains lead to the grouping of C. bescii.
