= Focillistis =

Scientific classification
- Kingdom: Animalia
- Phylum: Arthropoda
- Class: Insecta
- Order: Lepidoptera
- Superfamily: Noctuoidea
- Family: Erebidae
- Subfamily: Calpinae
- Genus: Focillistis; Hampson, 1926
- Species: F. sita

Binomial name
- Focillistis sita (Felder & Rogenhofer, 1874)

Synonyms
- Focilla sita Felder & Rogenhofer, 1874; Zethes salsoma C. Swinhoe, 1902

Genus of moths

Focillistis is a monotypic moth genus of the family Erebidae erected by George Hampson in 1926. Its only species, Focillistis sita, was first described by Felder and Rogenhofer in 1874. It is found in Sumatra, Nias, Borneo and Sulawesi.
