= Farara =

Scientific classification
- Domain: Eukaryota
- Kingdom: Animalia
- Phylum: Arthropoda
- Class: Insecta
- Order: Lepidoptera
- Superfamily: Noctuoidea
- Family: Noctuidae
- Subfamily: Acontiinae
- Genus: Farara; Bethune-Baker, 1908
- Species: F. pulchra

Binomial name
- Farara pulchra Bethune-Baker, 1908

Genus of moths

Farara is a monotypic moth genus of the family Noctuidae. Its only species, Farara pulchra, is found on New Guinea. Both the genus and species were first described by George Thomas Bethune-Baker in 1908.
