= Fissipunctia =

Scientific classification
- Domain: Eukaryota
- Kingdom: Animalia
- Phylum: Arthropoda
- Class: Insecta
- Order: Lepidoptera
- Superfamily: Noctuoidea
- Family: Noctuidae
- Subfamily: Xyleninae
- Genus: Fissipunctia; Beck, 1991

Genus of moths

Fissipunctia is a genus of moths of the family Noctuidae.

== Species ==
- Fissipunctia ypsillon (Denis & Schiffermüller, 1775)
