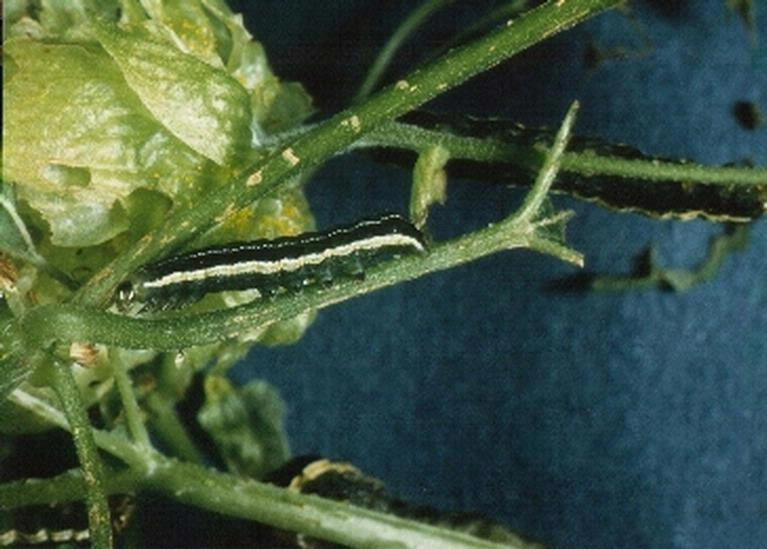

Scientific classification
- Domain: Eukaryota
- Kingdom: Animalia
- Phylum: Arthropoda
- Class: Insecta
- Order: Lepidoptera
- Superfamily: Noctuoidea
- Family: Noctuidae
- Genus: Mamestra
- Species: M. configurata

Binomial name
- Mamestra configurata Walker, 1856

Synonyms
- Copimamestra occidenta Grote, 1883; Mamestra occidenta

= Mamestra configurata =

Species of moth

Mamestra configurata, commonly known as the Bertha armyworm, is a moth of the family Noctuidae. It is found in the western part of North America (including Alberta, British Columbia, Washington, New Mexico, California) and Mexico.

Full-grown larvae drop to the ground in mid to late August to pupate.
