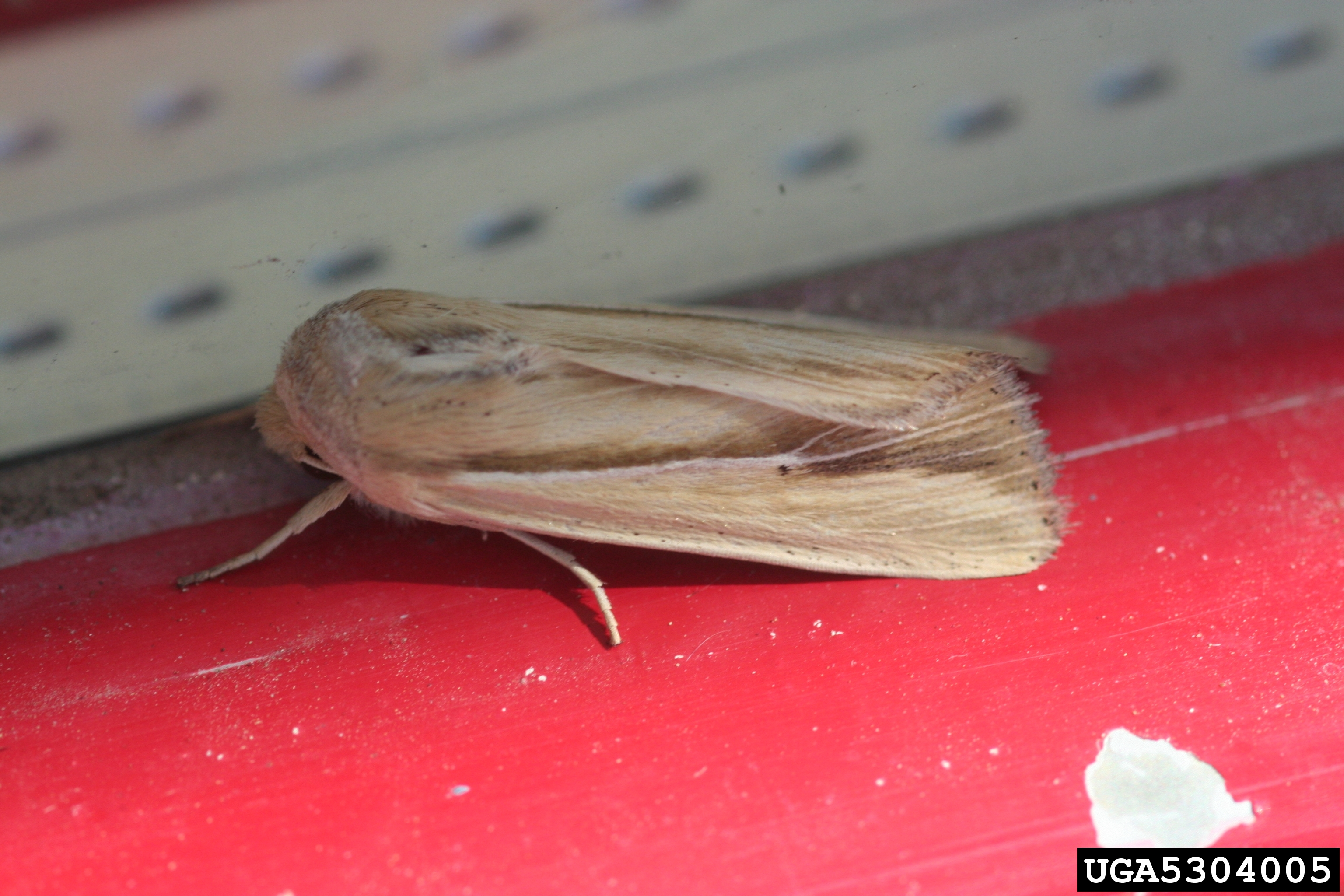

Scientific classification
- Kingdom: Animalia
- Phylum: Arthropoda
- Clade: Pancrustacea
- Class: Insecta
- Order: Lepidoptera
- Superfamily: Noctuoidea
- Family: Noctuidae
- Genus: Dargida
- Species: D. diffusa

Binomial name
- Dargida diffusa (Walker, 1856)

Synonyms
- Faronta diffusa; Leucania diffusa; Leucania moderata; Leucania harveyi

= Dargida diffusa =

Species of moth

Dargida diffusa, the wheat head armyworm, is a moth of the family Noctuidae. It is found in most of North America, except Yukon and Alaska.

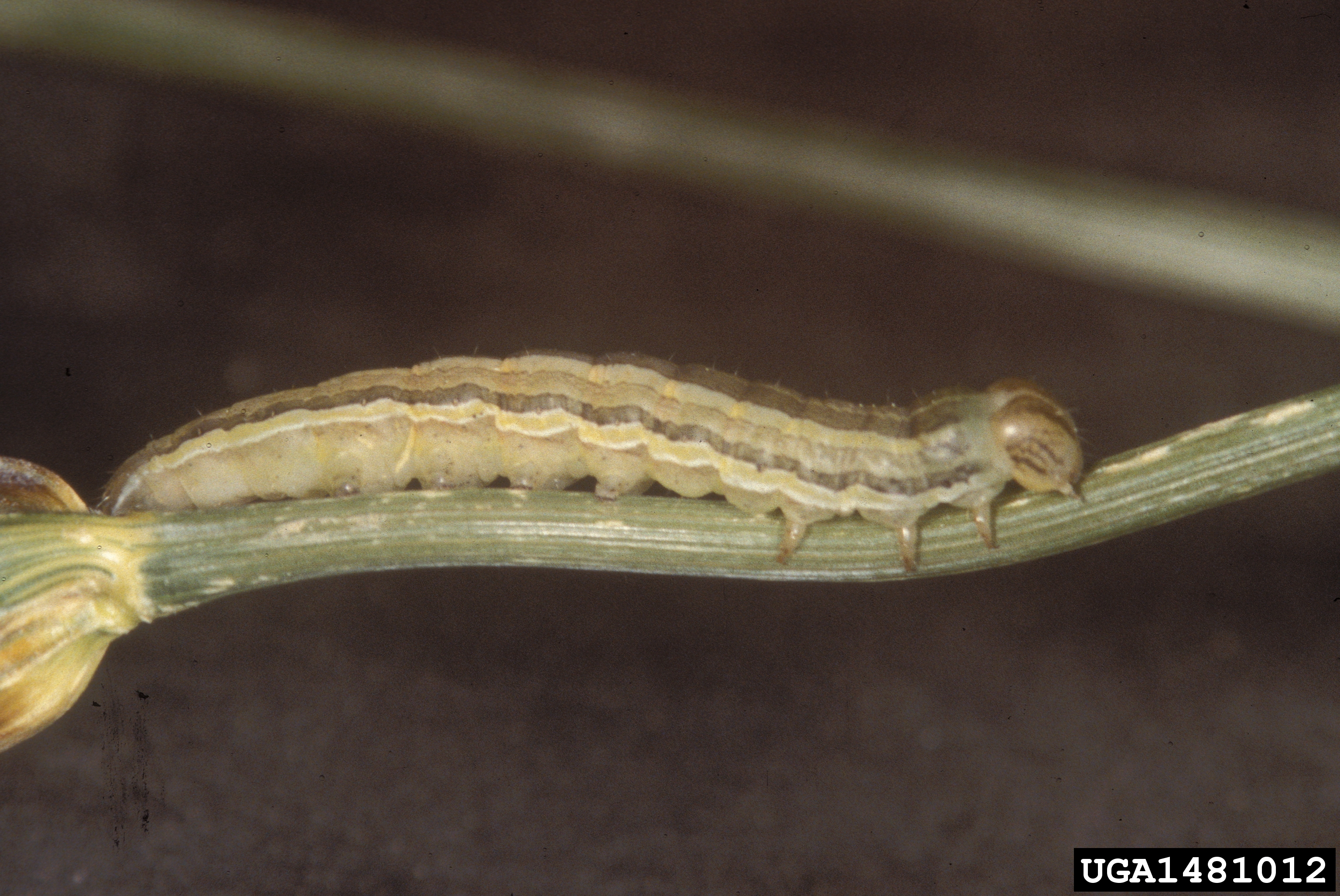
Caterpillar

The wingspan is 27–36 mm. Adults are on wing from May to September depending on the location.

The larvae feed on seed heads of cereal crops and grasses, especially Phleum pratense.

== Subspecies ==
- Dargida diffusa obscurior (Smith, 1902)
- Dargida diffusa limitata (Smith, 1902)
- Dargida diffusa neptis (Smith, 1902)
