= Fergana (moth) =

Scientific classification
- Kingdom: Animalia
- Phylum: Arthropoda
- Clade: Pancrustacea
- Class: Insecta
- Order: Lepidoptera
- Superfamily: Noctuoidea
- Family: Noctuidae
- Genus: Fergana

Genus of moths

Fergana is a genus of moths of the family Noctuidae. It is named after the Fergana Valley (or possibly the surrounding Fergana Region) in Central Asia.
