= Fabiania (moth) =

Scientific classification
- Kingdom: Animalia
- Phylum: Arthropoda
- Class: Insecta
- Order: Lepidoptera
- Superfamily: Noctuoidea
- Family: Noctuidae
- Subfamily: Cuculliinae
- Genus: Fabiania; Hreblay & Ronkay, 2000

Genus of moths

Fabiania is a genus of moths of the family Noctuidae.

== Species ==
- Fabiania pulla Hreblay & Ronkay, 2000
