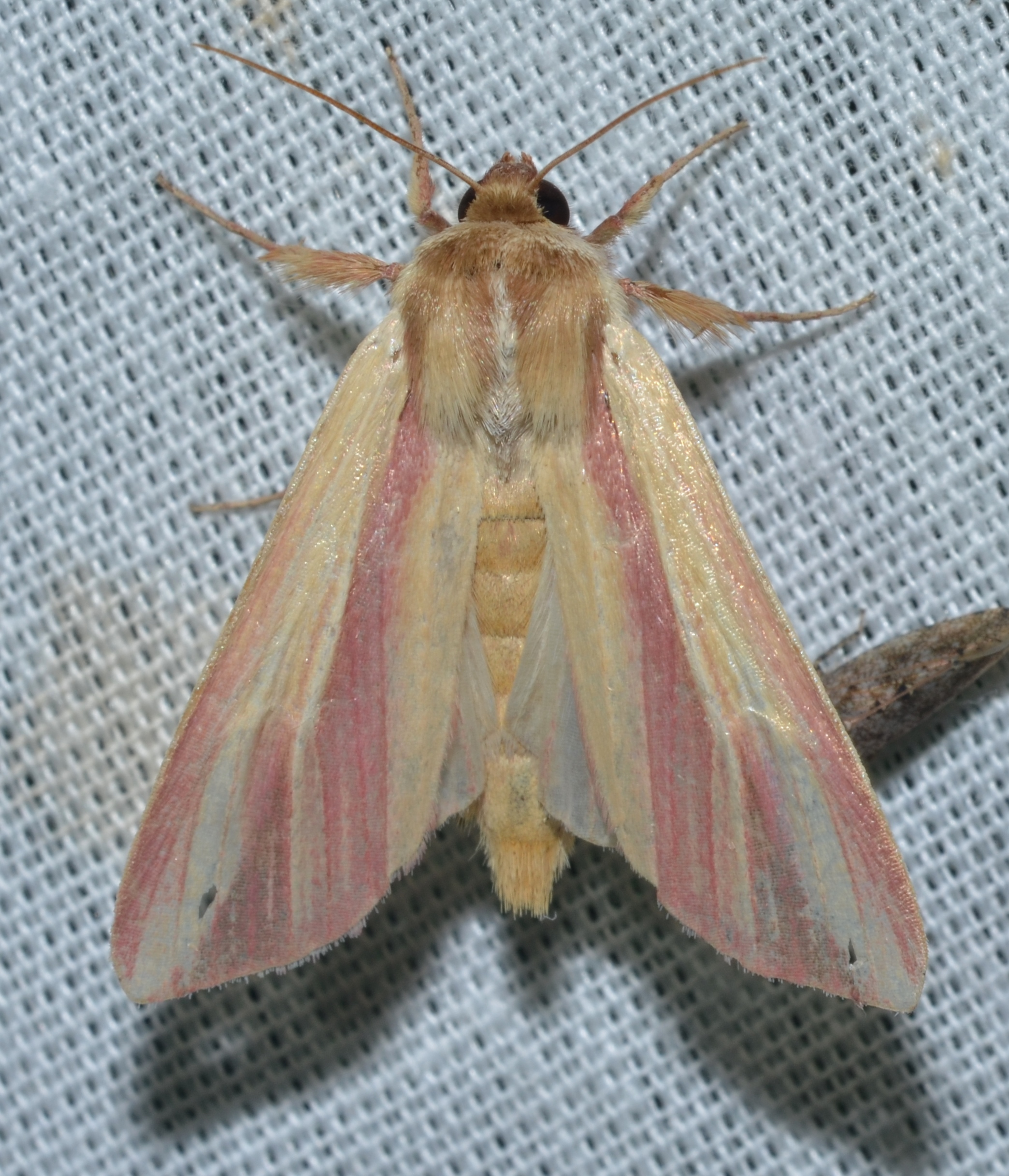

Scientific classification
- Kingdom: Animalia
- Phylum: Arthropoda
- Clade: Pancrustacea
- Class: Insecta
- Order: Lepidoptera
- Superfamily: Noctuoidea
- Family: Noctuidae
- Genus: Dargida
- Species: D. rubripennis

Binomial name
- Dargida rubripennis (Grote & Robinson, 1870)

Synonyms
- Leucania rubripennis Grote & Robinson, 1870; Faronta rubripennis

= Dargida rubripennis =

Species of moth

Dargida rubripennis, the pink streak, is a species of moth in the family Noctuidae. It was described by Augustus Radcliffe Grote and Coleman Townsend Robinson in 1870. It is found in the eastern United States, ranging to Kansas and Texas. It is listed as threatened in the US states of Massachusetts and Connecticut. The wingspan is 32–37 mm.
