= Selenomonas sputigena =

Scientific classification
- Domain: Bacteria
- Kingdom: Bacillati
- Phylum: Bacillota
- Class: Negativicutes
- Order: Selenomonadales
- Family: Selenomonadaceae
- Genus: Selenomonas
- Species: S. sputigena

Binomial name
- Selenomonas sputigena (Flügge 1886) Boskamp 1922

Synonyms
- Spirillum sputigenum Flügge 1886; Vibrio sputigenus Prévot 1940

Species of bacterium

Selenomonas sputigena is a species of anaerobe Gram-negative bacteria that is found in the upper respiratory tract of humans. It is the type species of the genus Selenomonas, with the type strain VPI D 19B-28 (ATCC 35185). It is known to cause blood infection (sepsis), gum inflammation (periodontal disease), and tooth decay. It alone cannot damage the tooth enamel, but worsen the damage done by other bacteria such as Streptococcus mutans, Porphyromonas gingivalis, Treponema denticola, and Tannerella forsythia.

S. sputigena was first noted by Antonie van Leeuwenhoek in 1683 from his microscopic observation of his own sputum. However, it was first described by Carl Flügge in 1886, giving the name Spirillum sputigenum. In 1922, Erwin Boskamp revised the name as S. sputigena, which was approved by the Judicial Commission of the International Committee on Systematic Bacteriology in 1958.

== Discovery and identification ==
S. sputigena is one of the earliest observed bacteria. In 1683, Dutch merchant-microscopist, Antonie van Leeuwenhoek, saw the organism from his own sputum. His drawing showed a structure with curved body, dotted lines coming from it that form a loop. German hygienist, Carl Flügge, first described the organisms as moving bacteria in 1886, identified them as Spirillum bacteria and gave the name Spirillum sputigenum. Willoughby Dayton Miller, American dentist, is sometimes attributed as the first to give the systematic classification allegedly in his works in the early 1880s. However, his dissertation at the University of Berlin in which he reported was published only in 1887. He did give the first clear description as "rods, curved like commas, which show very active spiral movements." It is not known whether or not he introduced the name S. sputigenum, but is obvious that the first definitive published description by Flügge was based on Miller's work.

In 1906, German bacteriologist, Waldemar Loewenthal, described the cause of the bacterial spiral movement as flagellar motion, mentioning that the bacteria had a single flagellum on the concave side of their bodies. Distinction as a unique species was not universally accepted. The simple and inconspicuous structure of the bacterium led Hugo Carl Plaut to redescribed in 1909 as generic bacteria that were only in their developmental stages. In 1913, Czech zoologist Stanislaus von Prowazek noticed hitherto unknown bacteria from the blood samples of dead African game animals. He identified the bacteria as a novel group and assigned the genus name Selenomonas. He compared the new bacteria with Flügge's S. sputigenum and Ancyromonas ruminantium that was described by French biologist Adrien Certes in 1889. The three bacteria were structurally similar.

In 1922, Erwin Boskamp revised the name as Selenomonas sputigena, based on von Prowazek's description of the genus. In 1958, the genus was approved by the Judicial Commission of the International Committee on Systematic Bacteriology with S. sputigena as its type species. The Judicial Commission adopted the formal classification in its 1980 Approved Lists of Bacteria with the type strain of S. sputigena as ATCC 33150 (VPI 10068). Genetic study in 1985 established that the assigned type strain was inaccurate and showed that it should be ATCC 35185 (or VPI D 19B-28), which the Jusicial Commission approved in 1992.

== Structure ==
S. sputigena, like other selenomonads, is typically crescent shaped and flagellated bacterium. However, it can take variable forms depending on its growth conditions, such as short and curved "crescent moon" or S-shaped spiral rod. The short forms are about 1 to 1.5 μm long and 0.3 μm in thickness. The long spiral forms can be from 4 to 50 μm long. The spiral are more pronounced than in other species of selenomonads. It normally has a tuft of flagella, consisting of several individual fibres and which are normally projected from the curved side of the cell. Sometimes described as peritrichous, indicating that the flagella are distributed evenly throughout the cell surface, there can be few flagella or none depending on the growth condition, and the site of the flagellar origin can also be random.

The dynamic arrangement of the flagella and the indistinct cytoplasmic structures led to several key misidentification. Loewenthal was the first to describe the presence of a single flagellum, as well as one or two nuclei in the bacterium. Observations in the 1920's also supported the description. For this reason, University of Birmingham bacteriologist M.H. Jeynes formally proposed in 1956 to reassign S. sputigena and the other selenomonads to a eukaryotic group, Protozoa. It is now known that the flagella are composed of the bacterial protein, flagellin.
