= Natranaerobius trueperi =

Scientific classification
- Domain: Bacteria
- Kingdom: Bacillati
- Phylum: Bacillota
- Class: Clostridia
- Order: Natranaerobiales
- Family: Natranaerobiaceae
- Genus: Natranaerobius
- Species: N. trueperi

Binomial name
- Natranaerobius trueperi Mesbah and Wiegel 2009

Type strain
- ATCC BAA-1443, DSM 18760, JW/NM-WN-LU

Species of bacterium

Natranaerobius trueperi is a thermotolerant, obligately alkaliphilic, anaerobic and extremely halophilic bacterium from the genus Natranaerobius which has been isolated from sediments from the Lake UmRisha in Egypt.
