= Natranaerobius thermophilus =

Scientific classification
- Domain: Bacteria
- Kingdom: Bacillati
- Phylum: Bacillota
- Class: Clostridia
- Order: Natranaerobiales
- Family: Natranaerobiaceae
- Genus: Natranaerobius
- Species: N. thermophilus

Binomial name
- Natranaerobius thermophilus Mesbah et al. 2007

Type strain
- ATCC BAA-1301, DSM 18059, JW/NM-WN-LF

Synonyms
- Natronanaerobium thermophilum

Species of bacterium

Natranaerobius thermophilus is a thermophilic, obligately anaerobic and halophilic bacterium from the genus Natranaerobius which has been isolated from the Wadi An Natrun lake in Egypt.
