= Natronoanaerobium salstagnum =

Scientific classification
- Domain: Bacteria
- Kingdom: Bacillati
- Phylum: Bacillota
- Class: Clostridia
- Order: Natranaerobiales
- Family: Natranaerobiaceae
- Genus: Natronoanaerobium
- Species: "N." salstagnum"

Binomial name
- "Natronoanaerobium" salstagnum" Jones et al. 1998

Species of bacterium

Natronoanaerobium salstagnum is a bacterium from the genus of Natronoanaerobium which has been isolated from Lake Magadi in Kenya.
