= Dialister invisus =

Scientific classification
- Domain: Bacteria
- Kingdom: Bacillati
- Phylum: Bacillota
- Class: Negativicutes
- Order: Veillonellales
- Family: Veillonellaceae
- Genus: Dialister
- Species: D. invisus

Binomial name
- Dialister invisus Downes et al. 2003

Species of bacterium

Dialister invisus is an anaerobe, gram-negative species of bacterium (coccobacilli) with ovoid-shaped cells. The bacterium has an incubation period of 2–3 days and was first isolated from an infected human root canal in 2003.

D. invisus has the potential to cause severe oral health issue; despite the fact that there have been no reported epidemics or outbreaks thus far, it is important to monitor the bacterium's prevalence and virulence.

== Structure ==
D. invisus is a coccobacillus: its shape can be described as being somewhere in between a sphere and a rod. The bacterium is obligately anaerobic, non-motile (it is unable to move independently), and occurs in various forms, e.g. singly, in pairs, in short chains, or in small clumps.

The bacterium species is unreactive and asaccharoltic; D. invisus in incapable of breaking down carbohydrates. Its metabolic end-products consist only of small traces of acetate and propionate. Indole and catalase are not produced at all. D. invisus only possesses a single chromosome and has a genome size of 1.9Mb.

== Ecology ==
The bacterium is most commonly found in the oral cavities, specifically root canals, of patients with periodontal and endodontic infections. Infected root canals contain amino acids and peptides that are essential for the development of D. invisus.

The bacterium has also been detected in other parts of the human body, specifically female reproductive organs. D. invisus has, for example, been detected in the fallopian tubes of women with salpingitis, and have also been linked to bacterial vaginosis and urinary tract infections. Considering that the bacterium has been identified in both symptomatic and asymptomatic individuals, there is cause to believe D. invisus plays a role in the normal microbiome.

Although this has not been proven yet, the bacterium might be capable of existing in the environment; the species is capable of existing in non-oral environments.

== Pathology ==
The association between D. invisus and disease is location-dependent; when found in the intestinal tract, the bacterium is not associated with disease, however, when found in the urinary, it could be linked to urinary tract infections. When found in the oral cavity, strong associations are made with periocoronitis, periodontitis, caries, halitosis, and endodontic infections.

The third molars of teenagers seem to be the favoured niche for periodontal pathogens. Compared to other teeth plaque, D. invisus was found more frequently in erupted third molars.

Due to the difficult nature of isolating and culturing D. invisus, it is believed that the numbers and locations of this bacterium in the body are more numerous than currently represented.

== Antimicrobial resistance ==
D. invisus is resistant to vancomycin and sensitive to colistin and kanamycin. It is important to continue monitoring the species and its resistance as the bacterium has been associated with oral disease.
