= Anaeroarcus burkinensis =

Scientific classification
- Domain: Bacteria
- Kingdom: Bacillati
- Phylum: Bacillota
- Class: Negativicutes
- Order: Selenomonadales
- Family: Sporomusaceae
- Genus: Anaeroarcus
- Species: A. burkinensis

Binomial name
- Anaeroarcus burkinensis (Ouattara et al. 1992) Strömpl et al. 1999

Type strain
- ATCC 51455, B(4)B(0), B4B0, CIP 105409, DSM 6283

Synonyms
- Anaerovibrio burkinabensis

Species of bacterium

Anaeroarcus burkinensis is a gram-negative, strictly anaerobic bacterium from the genus Anaeroarcus which has been isolated from soil from a rice field in Burkina Faso in Africa. Anaeroarcus burkinensis uses lactate as the only source of carbon.
