= Natranaerobaculum =

Scientific classification
- Domain: Bacteria
- Kingdom: Bacillati
- Phylum: Bacillota
- Class: Clostridia
- Order: Natranaerobiales
- Family: Natranaerobiaceae
- Genus: Natranaerobaculum; Zavarzina et al. 2013

Type species
- Natranaerobaculum magadiense Zavarzina et al. 2013

Species
- N. magadiense

Genus of bacteria

Natranaerobaculum is a Gram-positive, obligately alkaliphilic, anaerobic, thermotolerant, halotolerant and spore-forming genus of bacteria from the family of Natranaerobiaceae with one known species (Natranaerobaculum magadiense). Natranaerobaculum magadiense has been isolated from sediments from the Lake Magadi in Kenya.

== See also ==
- List of bacterial orders
- List of bacteria genera
