= Selenomonas lacticifex =

Scientific classification
- Domain: Bacteria
- Kingdom: Bacillati
- Phylum: Bacillota
- Class: Negativicutes
- Order: Selenomonadales
- Family: Selenomonadaceae
- Genus: Selenomonas
- Species: S. lacticifex

Binomial name
- Selenomonas lacticifex Schleifer et al. 1990

Species of bacterium

Selenomonas lacticifex is a species of anaerobic, Gram-negative, rod-shaped bacteria first isolated from spoilt beer.
