= Negativicoccus massiliensis =

Scientific classification
- Domain: Bacteria
- Kingdom: Bacillati
- Phylum: Bacillota
- Class: Negativicutes
- Order: Veillonellales
- Family: Veillonellaceae
- Genus: Negativicoccus
- Species: N. massiliensis

Binomial name
- Negativicoccus massiliensis Togo et al. 2016

Type strain
- CSUR P2082, DSM 100853, AT7

Species of bacterium

Negativicoccus massiliensis is a bacterium from the genus of Negativicoccus which has been isolated from human faeces.
