= Natronoanaerobium =

Scientific classification
- Domain: Bacteria
- Kingdom: Bacillati
- Phylum: Bacillota
- Class: Clostridia
- Order: Natranaerobiales
- Family: Natranaerobiaceae
- Genus: Natronoanaerobium; Jones et al. 1998

Type species
- "Natronoanaerobium salstagnum" Jones et al. 1998

Species
- "N. aggerbacterium"; "N. halophilum"; "N. salstagnum"

Genus of bacteria

Natranaerobaculum is a proposed genus of bacteria, to be ranked in the family of Natranaerobiaceae.

== Proposed species ==
There are three species proposed in the genus Natronoanaerobium, all sampled from Lake Magadi in Kenya.

- "Natronoanaerobium aggerbacterium" refers to the isolate G-M16NWC-4. It has been referenced for establishing taxonomy of sulfate-reducing bacteria.
- "Natronoanaerobium halophilum" refers to the isolate G-M14CH-4. It has been referenced for establishing taxonomy of other samples from salt-rich environment.
- "Natronoanaerobium salstagnum" refers to the isolate O-M12SP-2. It has since been referenced in multiple publications to establish the taxonomy of uncultured isolates, including other samples from high salt environments.

== See also ==
- List of bacterial orders
- List of bacteria genera
