= Natronovirga =

Scientific classification
- Domain: Bacteria
- Kingdom: Bacillati
- Phylum: Bacillota
- Class: Clostridia
- Order: Natranaerobiales
- Family: Natranaerobiaceae
- Genus: Natronovirga; Mesbah and Wiegel 2009

Type species
- Natronovirga wadinatrunensis Mesbah & Wiegel 2009

Species
- N. wadinatrunensis

Genus of bacteria

Natronovirga is a halophilic, thermophilic alkaliphilic, and anaerobic genus of bacteria from the family of Natranaerobiaceae with one known species (Natronovirga wadinatrunensis). Natronovirga wadinatrunensis has been isolated from sediments from the Lake Hamra in Egypt.

== See also ==
- List of bacterial orders
- List of bacteria genera
