= Negativicoccus succinicivorans =

Scientific classification
- Domain: Bacteria
- Kingdom: Bacillati
- Phylum: Bacillota
- Class: Negativicutes
- Order: Veillonellales
- Family: Veillonellaceae
- Genus: Negativicoccus
- Species: N. succinicivorans

Binomial name
- Negativicoccus succinicivorans Marchandin et al. 2010

Type strain
- ADV 07/08/06-B-1388, AIP 149.07, CCUG 56017, CIP 109806, DSM 21255

Synonyms
- Negicoccus succinivorans

Species of bacterium

Negativicoccus succinicivorans is a Gram-negative and anaerobic bacterium from the genus of Negativicoccus which has been isolated from a human toe wound in France.
