= Natranaerobius =

Scientific classification
- Domain: Bacteria
- Kingdom: Bacillati
- Phylum: Bacillota
- Class: Clostridia
- Order: Natranaerobiales
- Family: Natranaerobiaceae
- Genus: Natranaerobius; Mesbah et al. 2007

Type species
- Natranaerobius thermophilus Mesbah et al. 2007

Species
- N. thermophilus; N. trueperi

Synonyms
- "Natronanaerobium"

Genus of bacteria

Natranaerobius is a halophilic and anaerobic genus of bacteria from the family Natranaerobiaceae.

== See also ==
- List of bacterial orders
- List of bacteria genera
