= Selenomonas noxia =

Scientific classification
- Domain: Bacteria
- Kingdom: Bacillati
- Phylum: Bacillota
- Class: Negativicutes
- Order: Selenomonadales
- Family: Selenomonadaceae
- Genus: Selenomonas
- Species: S. noxia

Binomial name
- Selenomonas noxia Moore et al. 1987

Species of bacterium

Selenomonas noxia is gram-negative crescent-shaped bacteria included in the genus Selenomonas. Its increase is associated with periodontitis, especially its onset, as well as predominant in 98% of obese women in one study, but also is present in modest amounts in healthy gum tissue.
