= Dialister pneumosintes =

Scientific classification
- Domain: Bacteria
- Kingdom: Bacillati
- Phylum: Bacillota
- Class: Negativicutes
- Order: Veillonellales
- Family: Veillonellaceae
- Genus: Dialister
- Species: D. pneumosintes

Binomial name
- Dialister pneumosintes (Olitsky and Gates, 1921) emend. Jumas-Bilak et al., 2005

Synonyms
- Bacteroides pneumosintes (Olitsky and Gates, 1921) Holdeman and Moore, 1970

Species of bacterium

Dialister pneumosintes (formerly named Bacteroides pneumosintes) is a nonfermentative, anaerobic, gram-negative rod that grows with small, circular, transparent, shiny, smooth colonies on blood agar. D. pneumosintes has been recovered from deep periodontal pockets, but little is known about the relationship between the organism and destructive periodontal disease.

== History ==
Dialister pneumosintes, originally described by Olitsky and Gates as Bacterium pneumosintes in 1921, was first isolated from nasopharyngeal secretions of patients with influenza during the epidemics of 1918 through 1921. The species was later placed in the genus Dialister and subsequently transferred to the genus Bacteroides in 1970 (8).

During the 1980s, the genus Bacteroides underwent major taxonomic revisions, with many of the species being transferred to new genera. Shah and Collins in 1989 proposed that the genus Bacteroides be restricted to the saccharolytic, nonpigmented species of the Bacteroides fragilis group. B. pneumosintes differs from this genus as defined by Shah and Collins, and its true taxonomic affiliations remained uncertain. On the basis of phenotypic criteria, Moore and Moore have recently resurrected the genus Dialister, to accommodate B. pneumosintes. Dialister is a genus of Firmicutes bacteria classified within the class Negativicutes.

== Genome ==
Dialister pneumosintes has been difficult to identify and culture. Difficulties in isolation of D. pneumosintes may be the result of its strict anaerobic requirement and slow growth, its unreactivity in most conventional bacteriologic tests, the difficulty of distinguish it from the Eubacterium species in primary culture. The partial 16s rRNA gene sequence of D. pneumosintes ATCC 33048T consisted of 1,504 nucleotides (corresponding to positions 29 to 1504 of the Escherichia coli 16s rRNA). Sequence similarity calculations revealed that the closest known phylogenetic relatives of D. pneumosintes are the gram-negative organisms of the Sporomusa subbranch of the gram-positive bacteria (approximately 81 to 88% sequence similarity). Members of the B. fragilis group of species were phylogenetically far removed from D. pneumosintes, exhibiting approximately 70 to 72% sequence similarity. The sequence divergences observed between D. pneumosintes and M. elsdenii (approximately 11.5%) and between D. pneumosintes and Veillonella species (12.2 to 12.8%) are clearly indicative of separate genera.

== Role in disease ==
Dialister pneumosintes has shown pathogenic potential in various sites of the body including the lung, brain, and dental root canals. It has been isolated from several human infections. The species was first isolated from nasopharyngeal secretions of patients during the flu epidemic of 1918 to 1921. It has been identified in children with gingivitis and young adults with periodontitis. D. pneumosintes has also been recovered from pus and body fluids and from human bite wounds. Dialister pneumosintes has been shown to have a role also in odontogenic sinusitis (a specific kind of sinusitis caused by dental conditions or procedures). Since this bacteria is not found in the sinus or nose, these findings support the role of oral bacteria in the development of this particular condition.
