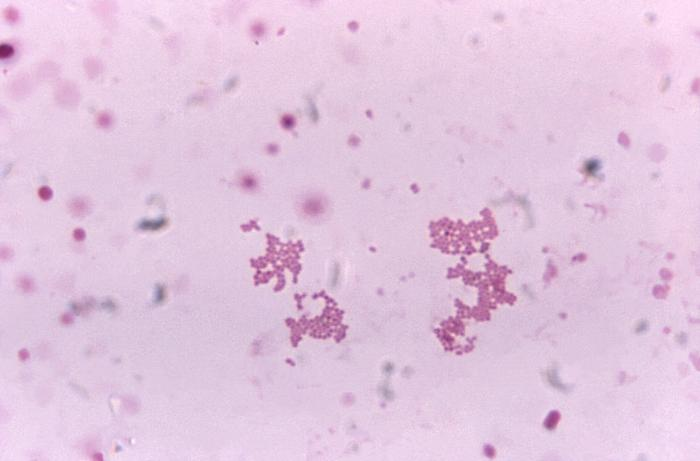

Scientific classification
- Domain: Bacteria
- Kingdom: Bacillati
- Phylum: Bacillota
- Class: Negativicutes
- Order: Veillonellales
- Family: Veillonellaceae
- Genus: Veillonella
- Species: V. parvula

Binomial name
- Veillonella parvula (Veillon and Zuber 1898) Prévot 1933

= Veillonella parvula =

Species of bacterium

Veillonella parvula is a strictly anaerobic, Gram-negative, coccus-shaped bacterium in the genus Veillonella. It is a normal part of the oral flora but can be associated with diseases such as periodontitis and dental caries as well as various systemic infections, including meningitis and osteomyelitis. It has also been isolated from women with bacterial vaginosis and has been associated with hypertension together with Campylobacter rectus and Prevotella melaninogenica.

V. parvula is unable to feed on carbohydrates, but can feed on lactate provided by Streptococcus species also found in the oral cavity. Specifically, Streptococcus mutans and V. parvula can form multispecies biofilms that lead to a lower susceptibility to antimicrobial treatments, resulting in periodontitis and dental caries.

== Antimicrobial susceptibility ==
V. parvula bacteria are susceptible to and typically treated with metronidazole and penicillin in clinical reports. Other antibiotics that have been shown to be active against V. parvula include cephalosporin, clindamycin, and chloramphenicol.

=== Antibiotic resistance ===
There have been several reports of antibiotic resistance in V. parvula isolates in different countries. In Greece, V. parvula isolates were found to be somewhat resistant to penicillin, ampicillin, piperacillin/tazobactam, clindamycin, and moxifloxacin, with no reported resistance to metronidazole. In Taiwan, V. parvula isolates were found to be resistant against metronidazole. These findings represent the growing issue of antibiotic resistance worldwide.
