= Sporomusa termitida =

Scientific classification
- Domain: Bacteria
- Kingdom: Bacillati
- Phylum: Bacillota
- Class: Negativicutes
- Order: Selenomonadales
- Family: Sporomusaceae
- Genus: Sporomusa
- Species: S. termitida

Binomial name
- Sporomusa termitida Breznak et al. 1990

Species of bacterium

Sporomusa termitida is a species of bacteria. It is an acetogen first isolated from termites (Nasutitermes nigriceps). Its cells are strictly anaerobic, Gram-negative, endospore-forming, straight to slightly curved rods (0.5–0.8×2–8 μm) that are motile by means of lateral flagella.
