= Anaerosinus glycerini =

Scientific classification
- Domain: Bacteria
- Kingdom: Bacillati
- Phylum: Bacillota
- Class: Negativicutes
- Order: Selenomonadales
- Family: Sporomusaceae
- Genus: Anaerosinus
- Species: A. glycerini

Binomial name
- Anaerosinus glycerini (Schauder and Schink 1996) Strömpl et al. 1999

Type strain
- ATCC 51177, CIP 105408, DSM 5192, LGS4

Synonyms
- Anaerovibrio glycerini Schauder & Schink 1996

Species of bacterium

Anaerosinus glycerini is a bacterium from the genus Anaerosinus which has been isolated from freshwater mud in Germany.
