= Selenomonad =

Scientific classification
- Domain: Bacteria
- Kingdom: Bacillati
- Phylum: Bacillota
- Class: Negativicutes
- Order: Selenomonadales
- Family: Selenomonadaceae
- Genus: Selenomonas von Prowazek 1913

Type species
- Selenomonas sputigena (Flügge 1886) Boskamp 1922

Species
- See text

Genus of bacteria

Members of the genus Selenomonas (motile crescent-shaped bacteria in general) are referred to trivially as selenomonads. The genus Selenomonas constitutes a group of motile crescent-shaped bacteria and includes species living in the gastrointestinal tracts of animals, in particular the ruminants. A number of smaller forms discovered with the light microscope are now in culture but many, especially the large selenomonads are not, owing to their fastidious and incompletely known growth requirements.

== Gram stain ==
The family Veillonellaceae was transferred from the order Eubacteriales to the new order Selenomonadales in the new class Negativicutes. Despite most of the members of the Bacillota staining positive for the Gram stain and being trivially called "low-GC Gram-positives" (cf. Bacterial phyla), members of the Negativicutes stain Gram-negative and possess a double bilayer.

This transfer now appears to have been mistaken. On further examination the Selenomonads appear to be members of the Clostridia.

== Etymology ==
The etymology of the name Selenomonas comes from the Ancient Greek noun selênê (σελήνη), meaning the moon, a linking -o- and the noun monas (μόνας) which in microbiology has come to mean bacterium. The name Selenomonas simply refers to the crescent moon-shaped profile of this organism and not in any way to the chemical element selenium. The unique cell morphology of certain large selenomonads (with its in-folding of the cell membrane behind the flagella) would indicate bilateral symmetry along the long axis—an unusual property for prokaryotes.

== History and description ==
The literature on Selenomonas has roots dating back to the 19th century—and beyond—since the features and movements of living (then unclassified) crescent-shaped microorganisms from the human mouth were first described by Antonie van Leeuwenhoek in 1683. During more recent years the crescent-shaped organism observed in ruminant stomachs has been variously described as:

- Ancyromonas ruminantium,
- Selenomastix ruminantium,
- Spirillum ruminantium,
- Selenomonas ruminantium.

As can be ascertained from the above nomenclature, the genus Selenomonas provides a fascinating history of scientific discovery, involving placement then re-placement in the classification systematics, oscillating between animal and bacterial kingdoms. In early descriptions it was thought to be a protozoan and hence for a while received the name Selenomastix.

The most morphologically interesting members of the selenomonads are undoubtedly the large motile crescents found in the warm anaerobic nutrient-rich microecosystem provided by ruminant rumen, guinea-pig caecum (S. palpitans) and even pockets in the human gingiva (S. sputigena). In the illustrated atlas of sheep rumen organisms of Moir and Masson their organisms nos. 4 and 5 represent two forms of the large Selenomonads. These crescents live only a short time under the light microscope but during that time display a remarkable "tumbling" motion produced by one (or two—during cell division) flagella emanating from a refractile basal body on the concave side, which was first described by Woodcock & LaPage, studied later by Lessel & Breed (with photomicrographic addendum from C. F. Robinow), then by Jeynes, who (mistakenly) interpreted it as a "blepharoplast".

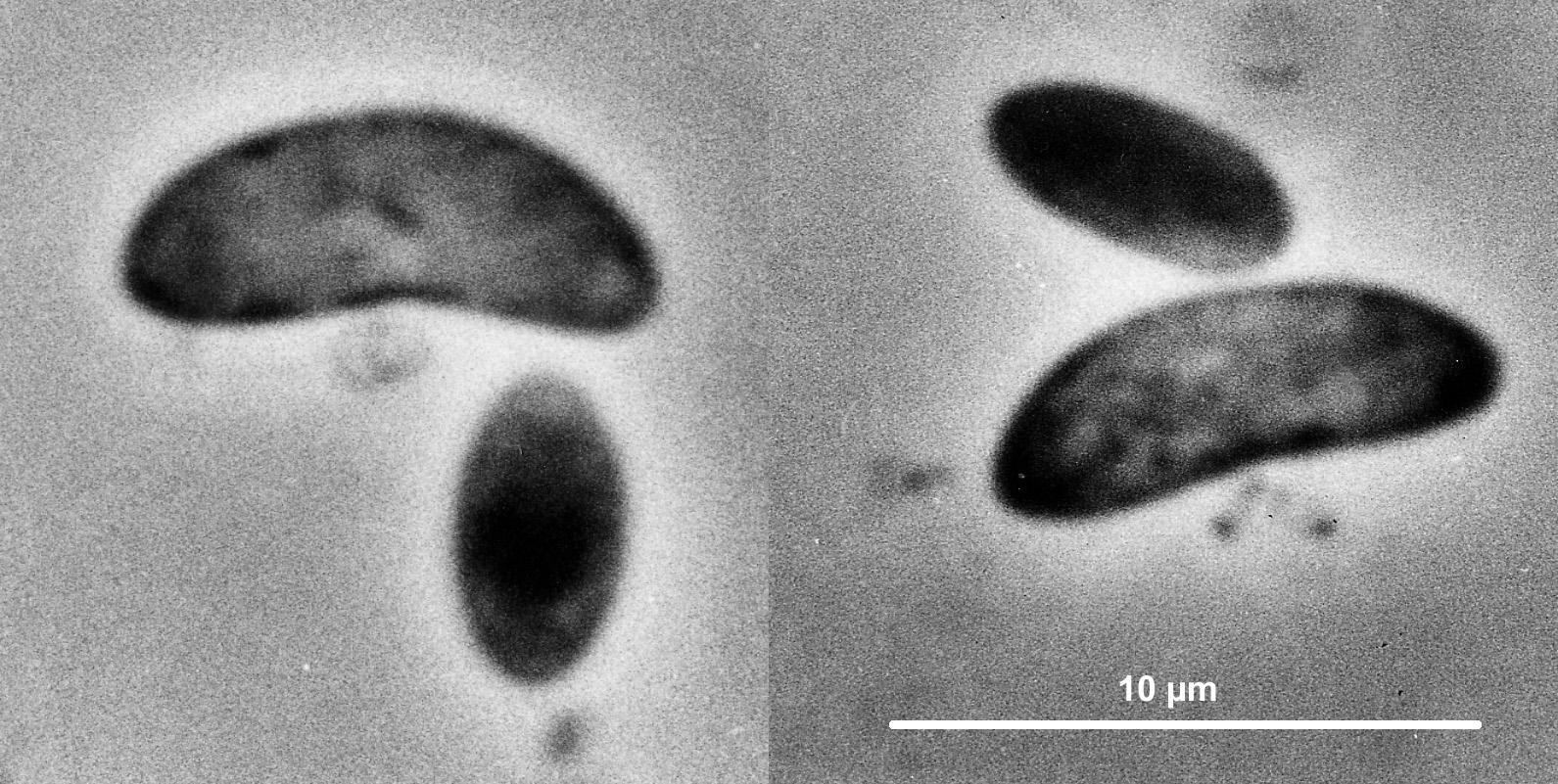
Large forms of Selenomonas from enriched sheep rumen liquor after aldehyde fixation. Phase contrast 100x oil imm., electronic flash. Shows coiled-up flagella and dark linear region along concave side at flagella attachment region.

Years later, preparations of native rumen contents were examined for the first time by transmission electron microscopy of thin sections, negative stains and freeze-fracture replicas. and many of the reasons for previous confusion were clarified. The "flagellum" was found to be quite unrelated to the flagellum of ciliate protozoa, instead consisting of a "fascicle" of numerous bacterial-type flagella (each displaying 11-fold subunit symmetry), twisted just outside the cell body into helical bundles to form strong organs of propulsion. The large crescents (which are better described as "bean-shaped") have flagella which are quite differently inserted into the concave side of the cell from those of the smaller species of Selenomonas. The small selenomonads have a rather low number of individual flagella inserted in a longitudinal row along the concave side whereas the large selenomonads have a much larger number, inserted into a circular patch of the cell membrane in the concave side in a close-packed (hexagonal) pattern, each flagellum inserted into a bullet-shaped structure at the cell membrane. Another interesting feature is the refractile body located beneath the massive flagella bundle characterizing the large crescents. It is not related morphologically to the ciliate blepharoplast (a "9+2" centriole-related structure found in cryptogams such as cycads, Ginkgo biloba and algae e.g. Euglena and Chlamydomonas). This flagella-associated structure observed in the large selenomonad can perhaps best be described as a "basal sac" formed by an invagination (in-folding) of the "polar organelle" region of the bacterial cell membrane in the middle of the concave side of the organism so that it lies directly behind the flagella. It appears to be unique in prokaryotes so far examined since in other bacteria possessing polar organelles, the structure is situated beside and around the flagella insertion bases in the cell membrane, but never lying behind them in the cytoplasm as in the case of the large selenomonad. The large crescents, with their unique morphology, still present many puzzles in their systematics. It is already clear from ultrastructural features that the genus Selenomonas is most probably an artificial classification, bringing together possibly unrelated organisms, simply because of their common possession of crescent morphology and peculiar flagellar insertion location. Successful attempts to maintain the large crescents in continuous culture over short terms have been reported by Prins but long term culturing has not been possible so far. Genetic sequencing of the large crescents should provide the essential information required to better understand and classify these organisms.

Sketch of a sagittal longitudinal ultrathin section through an unidentified large selenomonad from sheep rumen liquor (which seems to correspond closely to descriptions of S. palpitans).

With regard to the small selenomonads, research on obesity suggests that S. noxia may be an indicator of change in oral microbial ecology and might be directly or indirectly involved in obesity.

== Phylogeny ==
The currently accepted taxonomy is based on the List of Prokaryotic names with Standing in Nomenclature (LPSN) and National Center for Biotechnology Information (NCBI).

16S rRNA based LTP_10_2024

- - - Selenomonas~1
      - Selenomonas artemidis Moore et al. 1987
      - - - Selenomonas noxia Moore et al. 1987
          - Selenomonas flueggei Moore et al. 1987
        - - Selenomonas infelix Moore et al. 1987
          - - Selenomonas dianae Moore et al. 1987
            - - Selenomonas timonae Antezack et al. 2021
              - Centipeda periodontii
  - - - Schwartzia
      - Anaerovibrio
    - - Selenomonas sputigena (Flügge 1886) Boskamp 1922 (Type sp.)
      - - - Selenomonas~2
            - Selenomonas bovis Zhang and Dong 2009
            - Selenomonas lipolytica Dighe et al. 1998
        - - Selenomonas montiformis Wylensek et al. 2021
          - - Selenomonas lacticifex Schleifer et al. 1990
            - - Mitsuokella
              - - Selenomonas~3
                  - Selenomonas caprae Poothong et al. 2023
                  - Selenomonas ruminantium (Certes 1899) Wenyon 1926

120 marker proteins based GTDB 10-RS226

- - Anaerovibrio
  - - Selenomonas sputigena (Flügge 1886) Boskamp 1922
    - - Quinella
      - - - Centipeda
            - Selenomonas artemidis
            - - - Selenomonas flueggei
                - - "Ca. C. aniraria" Gilroy et al. 2023 [sp015265235]
                  - "Selenomonas felix" Kuete et al. 2019
              - - Selenomonas noxia
                - - Selenomonas timonae
                  - - - "Selenomonas massiliensis" Belkacemi et al. 2018
                      - C. periodontii Lai et al. 1983
                    - - Selenomonas dianae
                      - Selenomonas infelix
        - - - Selenomonas bovis {Selenomonas_C}
            - Mitsuokella
          - - Selenomastix
              - Selenomonas montiformis
              - - - Selenomonas caprae
                  - Selenomonas ruminis Poothong et al. 2024
                - - "Selenomonas lactilytica" (Bryant 1956) Hungate 1966
                  - S. ruminantium (Certes 1899) Woodcock & Lapage 1913-1914

Unassigned species:

- "S. palpitans" Simons 1922

== See also ==
- List of bacterial orders
- List of bacteria genera
