= Megasphaera =

Scientific classification
- Domain: Bacteria
- Kingdom: Bacillati
- Phylum: Bacillota
- Class: Negativicutes
- Order: Veillonellales
- Family: Veillonellaceae
- Genus: Megasphaera; Rogosa 1971

Type species
- Megasphaera elsdenii (Gutierrez et al. 1959) Rogosa 1971

Species
- See text

Genus of bacteria

Megasphaera is a genus of Bacillota bacteria classified within the class Negativicutes. Several species in the genus, including M. elsdenii and M. hexanoica, are known to utilize lactate.

This classification has been reexamined. This genus appears to be a member of the Clostridia.

== Phylogeny ==
The currently accepted taxonomy is based on the List of Prokaryotic names with Standing in Nomenclature (LPSN) and National Center for Biotechnology Information (NCBI).

16S rRNA based LTP_10_2024

- Megasphaera
  - M. micronuciformis Marchandin et al. 2003
  - - - Anaeroglobus geminatus Carlier et al. 2002
      - - - M. paucivorans Juvonen and Suihko 2006
          - M. sueciensis Juvonen and Suihko 2006
        - - M. cerevisiae Engelmann and Weiss 1986
          - M. vaginalis Bordigoni et al. 2020 non Srinivasan et al. 2021
    - - - M. hutchinsoni Srinivasan et al. 2021
        - M. lornae Srinivasan et al. 2021
      - - - M. hexanoica Jeon et al. 2017
          - M. hominis Liu et al. 2022
        - - - M. butyrica Hitch et al. 2022
            - M. stantonii Maki & Looft 2018
          - - M. massiliensis Padmanabhan et al. 2016
            - - M. elsdenii (Gutierrez et al. 1959) Rogosa 1971
              - M. indica Lanjekar et al. 2014

120 marker proteins based GTDB 10-RS226

- - - Megasphaera_C
      - Megasphaera hutchinsoni
      - Megasphaera lornae
  - - - - "Caecibacter"
          - "Megasphaera hominis"
          - "C. massiliensis" Ricaboni et al. 2017
            (incl. Megasphaera hexanoica)
      - - Megasphaera paucivorans
        - - Anaeroglobus
            - Megasphaera vaginalis
            - - "A. micronuciformis"
              - - "Colibacter massiliensis" Mailhe et al. 2017
                - A. geminatus
    - - Megasphaera
        - - M. cerevisiae
          - M. stantonii
        - - M. massiliensis
          - - M. elsdenii
            - "M. intestinihominis" Hitch et al. 2025

Unassigned species:

- M. jansseni Heng et al. 2025
- "M. vaginalis" Srinivasan et al. 2021 non Bordigoni et al. 2020

== See also ==
- List of bacterial vaginosis microbiota
- List of bacterial orders
- List of bacteria genera
