= Sporomusa ovata =

Scientific classification
- Domain: Bacteria
- Kingdom: Bacillati
- Phylum: Bacillota
- Class: Negativicutes
- Order: Selenomonadales
- Family: Sporomusaceae
- Genus: Sporomusa
- Species: S. ovata

Binomial name
- Sporomusa ovata Möller et al. 1984

Species of bacterium

Sporomusa ovata is a species of bacteria with characteristic banana-shaped cells. Its cells are strictly anaerobic, Gram-negative, endospore-forming, straight to slightly curved rods that are motile by means of lateral flagella. It has been the subject of much research into electrosynthesis of energy-containing carbon chains.

Sporomusa ovata is a candidate as the biological catalyst for an "artificial leaf" that converts sunlight, water, and carbon dioxide into oxygen and liquid fuels.
