= Quinella =

Quinella may refer to:

- Quinella (album), an album by the musical group Atlanta Rhythm Section
- Quinella (bacterium), a genus of bacteria in the family Veillonellaceae
- Quinella (bet), a type of wager in parimutuel betting

== See also ==
- La quiniela, a 1960 Spanish comedy film (English title The Football Lottery)
