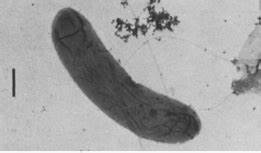
- Sporomusa sp.

Scientific classification
- Domain: Bacteria
- Kingdom: Bacillati
- Phylum: Bacillota
- Class: Negativicutes
- Order: Selenomonadales
- Family: Sporomusaceae
- Genus: Sporomusa; Möller et al. 1985

Type species
- Sporomusa sphaeroides Möller et al. 1985

Species
- See text

= Sporomusa =

Genus of bacteria

Sporomusa is a genus of Bacillota bacteria classified within the class Negativicutes.

Further examination of members of this clade suggest that this group are actually members of the Clostridia.

== Phylogeny ==
The currently accepted taxonomy is based on the List of Prokaryotic names with Standing in Nomenclature (LPSN) and National Center for Biotechnology Information (NCBI).

16S rRNA based LTP_10_2024

- Sporomusa
  - S. acidovorans Ollivier et al. 1990
  - - - - S. aerivorans Boga et al. 2003
        - S. rhizae Gößner et al. 2006
      - - S. termitida Breznak et al. 1990
        - - S. ovata Möller et al. 1985
          - S. silvacetica Kuhner et al. 1997
    - - S. malonica Dehning et al. 1990
      - - S. paucivorans Hermann et al. 1987
        - S. sphaeroides Möller et al. 1985

120 marker proteins based GTDB 10-RS226

- Sporomusa
  - - S. malonica
    - S. termitida
  - - - S. aerivorans
      - S. sphaeroides
    - - S. rhizae
      - - S. acidovorans
        - - S. ovata
          - S. silvacetica

Unassigned species:

- S. carbonis Böer et al. 2025
- S. intestinalis Hattori et al. 2025

== See also ==
- List of bacterial orders
- List of bacteria genera
