= Lucifera =

Lucifera is a female Latin name or epithet meaning 'light-bearing' and referring to:

- Diana Lucifera, a title or aspect of the Roman goddess Diana
- Lucifera, a daughter of Greek god Pluto, invented by Spenser in The Faerie Queen
- Lucifera (comics), a 1970 Italian fumetti comic book demoness character
- Lucifera: Demon Lover, 1972 Italian film
- Lucifera (bacterium), a genus of bacteria

== See also ==
- Lucifer
