= Common sneezeweed =

Common sneezeweed is a common name for several plants and may refer to:

- Centipeda cunninghamii, native to Australia
- Helenium autumnale, native to North America
