= Megamonas =

Scientific classification
- Domain: Bacteria
- Kingdom: Bacillati
- Phylum: Bacillota
- Class: Negativicutes
- Order: Selenomonadales
- Family: Selenomonadaceae
- Genus: Megamonas; Shah and Collins 1983

Type species
- Megamonas hypermegale corrig. (Harrison & Hansen 1963) Shah & Collins 1983

Species
- M. funiformis; "Ca. M. gallistercoris"; M. hypermegale; M. rupellensis

Genus of bacteria

Megamonas is a genus of Bacillota bacteria classified within the class Negativicutes.

== Phylogeny ==
The currently accepted taxonomy is based on the List of Prokaryotic names with Standing in Nomenclature (LPSN) and National Center for Biotechnology Information (NCBI).

16S rRNA based LTP_10_2024

- Megamonas
  - M. hypermegale corrig. (Harrison and Hansen 1963) Shah and Collins 1983
  - - M. funiformis Sakon et al. 2008
    - M. rupellensis Chevrot et al. 2008

120 marker proteins based GTDB 10-RS226

- Megamonas
  - M. funiformis [incl. Megamonas rupellensis]
  - - "Ca. M. gallistercoris" Gilroy et al. 2021
    - M. hypermegale
