= Anaeroarcus =

Scientific classification
- Domain: Bacteria
- Kingdom: Bacillati
- Phylum: Bacillota
- Class: Negativicutes
- Order: Selenomonadales
- Family: Sporomusaceae
- Genus: Anaeroarcus; Strömpl et al. 1999

Type species
- Anaeroarcus burkinensis corrig. (Ouattara et al. 1992) Strömpl et al. 1999

Species
- Anaeroarcus burkinensis

Genus of bacteria

Anaeroarcus is a Gram-negative, non-spore-forming, chemoorganotroph and motile bacterial genus from the family Sporomusaceae, with one known species (Anaeroarcus burkinensis).
