= Veillonella =

Scientific classification
- Domain: Bacteria
- Kingdom: Bacillati
- Phylum: Bacillota
- Class: Negativicutes
- Order: Veillonellales
- Family: Veillonellaceae
- Genus: Veillonella; Prévot 1933

Type species
- Veillonella parvula (Veillon & Zuber 1898) Prévot 1933

Species
- See text

Synonyms
- "Syzygiococcus" Herzberg 1928

Genus of bacteria

Veillonella are Gram-negative bacteria (Gram stain pink) anaerobic cocci, unlike most Bacillota, which are Gram-positive bacteria. This bacterium is well known for its lactate fermenting abilities. It is a normal bacterium in the intestines and oral mucosa of mammals. In humans they have been implicated in cases of osteomyelitis and endocarditis, for example with the species Veillonella parvula.

Veillonella dispar is the most nitrate-reducing bacterium in the oral cavity, which is beneficially anti-bacterial.

When Veillonella is responsible for clinical infections in humans, it should be kept in mind that more than 70% of the strains are resistant to penicillin, while more than 95% of the strains are susceptible to amoxicillin/clavulanate.

Previous studies have shown that exercise is associated with changes in microbiome composition. Specifically, Veillonella, Bacteroides, Prevotella, Methanobrevibacter, and Akkermansiaceae are in more abundance in endurance athletes. Specifically, one study has proposed that V. atypica is beneficial for endurance performance because the high-lactate environment of the athlete provides a selective advantage for colonization by lactate metabolizing organisms, such as Veillonella.

== Fermentation ==
Lactate is fermented to propionate and acetate by the methylmalonyl-CoA pathway. Little ATP is produced in this fermentation. High substrate affinity is suggested to be the reason.

3 Lactate → acetate + 2 propionate + CO_{2}+ H_{2}O

A study of Veillonella in endurance athletes found that a relative abundance of the bacteria in the gut is associated with increased treadmill run time performance in mouse models. This effect was proposed to be due to the propionate metabolite produced from lactic acid.

== Phylogeny ==
The currently accepted taxonomy is based on the List of Prokaryotic names with Standing in Nomenclature (LPSN) and National Center for Biotechnology Information (NCBI).

16S rRNA based LTP_08_2023

- Veillonella
  - - V. magna Kraatz and Taras 2008
    - - - V. criceti (Rogosa 1965) Mays et al. 1982
        - V. intestinalis Afrizal et al. 2023
      - - V. ratti (Rogosa 1965) Mays et al. 1982 emend. Kraatz and Taras 2008
        - V. seminalis Aujoulat et al. 2014
  - - V. montpellierensis Jumas-Bilak et al. 2004
    - - - V. agrestimuris Afrizal et al. 2023
        - V. caviae Mays et al. 1982
      - - - V. fallax Afrizal et al. 2023
          - - V. dispar (Rogosa 1965) Mays et al. 1982
            - V. infantium Mashima et al. 2018
        - - - V. denticariosi Byun et al. 2007
            - V. rodentium (Rogosa 1965) Mays et al. 1982
          - - V. atypica (Rogosa 1965) Mays et al. 1982
            - - V. tobetsuensis Mashima et al. 2013
              - - V. hominis Liu et al. 2022
                - - V. parvula (Veillon and Zuber 1898) Prévot 1933 Mays et al. 1982
                  - V. rogosae Arif et al. 2008

120 marker proteins based GTDB 10-RS226

- Veillonella
  - - V. magna
    - - - V. criceti
        - V. intestinalis
      - - V. ratti
        - V. seminalis
  - - V. montpellierensis
    - - "Ca. V. ediparia" Gilroy et al. 2023 [sp900550455]
      - - - - V. agrestimuris
            - V. caviae
          - - V. atypica
            - V. tobetsuensis
        - - - V. denticariosi
            - V. rodentium
          - - - V. hominis
              - V. parvula
            - - V. rogosae
              - - - V. dispar
                  - V. fallax
                - - V. infantium
                  - V. nakazawae Mishima et al. 2020

Unassigned species:

- V. absiana Bai et al. 2025
- "V. faecalis" Yang et al. 2024
- "V. massiliensis" Togo et al. 2017
- "V. orientalis" Mashima-Usami et al. 2024
- "Ca. V. sanguinis" Heng et al. 2025 ["Ca. V. atypica" Drancourt et al. 2004 non (Rogosa 1965) Mays et al. 1982]

== Infections and Treatment ==
Meningitis, osteomyelitis, periodontitis, and endocarditis are infections that can be caused by V. parvula. Prosthetic joint infection and endocarditis have been shown to be caused by V. dispar. Although very rare, endocarditis has also been caused by V. montpellierensis and V. alcalescens.

A large percentage of Veillonella species are resistant to penicillin. Antibiotics that Veillonella species are less resistant to or not resistant to at all include clindamycin, metronidazole, imipenem, ceftriaxone, and amoxicillin.

== See also ==
- List of bacterial orders
- List of bacteria genera
