= Anaerosinus =

Scientific classification
- Domain: Bacteria
- Kingdom: Bacillati
- Phylum: Bacillota
- Class: Negativicutes
- Order: Selenomonadales
- Family: Sporomusaceae
- Genus: Anaerosinus; Strömpl et al. 1999

Type species
- Anaerosinus glycerini (Schauder & Schink 1996) Strompl et al. 1999

Species
- A. gibii (Yeo et al. 2024) Heng et al. 2025; A. glycerini (Schauder and Schink 1996) Strömpl et al. 1999; A. massiliensis Heng et al. 2025

Genus of bacteria

Anaerosinus is a Gram-negative, non-spore-forming, obligately anaerobic, chemoorganotrophic and motile bacterial genus from the family Sporomusaceae.

== See also ==
- List of bacterial orders
- List of bacteria genera
