= Acidaminococcus =

Scientific classification
- Domain: Bacteria
- Kingdom: Bacillati
- Phylum: Bacillota
- Class: Negativicutes
- Order: Acidaminococcales
- Family: Acidaminococcaceae
- Genus: Acidaminococcus; Rogosa 1969

Type species
- Acidaminococcus fermentans Rogosa 1969

Species
- A. fermentans; A. hominis; A. intestini; "A. massiliensis"; "A. provencensis"; "A. timonensis"

Genus of bacteria

Acidaminococcus is a genus in the phylum Bacillota (Bacteria), whose members are anaerobic diplococci that can use amino acids as the sole energy source for growth. Like other members of the class Negativicutes, they are gram-negative, despite being Bacillota, which are normally gram-positive.

== Etymology ==
The name Acidaminococcus derives from:
Neo-Latin noun acidum (from Latin adjective acidus, sour), an acid; Neo-Latin adjective aminus, amino; Neo-Latin masculine gender noun coccus (from Greek masculine gender noun kokkos (κόκκος), grain, seed), coccus-shaped; Neo-Latin masculine gender noun Acidaminococcus, the amino acid coccus.

== Phylogeny ==
The currently accepted taxonomy is based on the List of Prokaryotic names with Standing in Nomenclature (LPSN) and National Center for Biotechnology Information (NCBI).

16S rRNA based LTP_10_2024

- Acidaminococcus
  - A. intestini
  - - A. fermentans
    - A. hominis

120 marker proteins based GTDB 10-RS226

- Acidaminococcus
  - A. intestini Jumas-Bilak et al. 2007
  - - A. hominis Abdugheni et al. 2023 [incl. "A. provencensis" Takakura et al. 2019]
    - - "A. timonensis" Ricaboni et al. 2017
      - - A. fermentans Rogosa 1969
        - "A. massiliensis" Ricaboni et al. 2017

== See also ==
- List of bacterial orders
- List of bacteria genera
