= Anaerospora =

Scientific classification
- Domain: Bacteria
- Kingdom: Bacillati
- Phylum: Bacillota
- Class: Negativicutes
- Order: Selenomonadales
- Family: Sporomusaceae
- Genus: Anaerospora; Woo et al. 2016
- Species: A. hongkongensis

Binomial name
- Anaerospora hongkongensis Woo et al. 2016

Genus of bacteria

Anaerospora is a Gram-negative genus of bacteria from the family of Sporomusaceae with one known species, Anaerospora hongkongensis.
