= Natranaerofaba =

Scientific classification
- Domain: Bacteria
- Kingdom: Bacillati
- Phylum: Bacillota
- Class: Clostridia
- Order: Natranaerobiales
- Family: Natranaerofabaceae
- Genus: Natranaerofaba; Sorokin et al. 2021

Type species
- Natranaerofaba carboxydovora Sorokin et al. 2021

Species
- N. carboxydovora

Genus of bacteria

Natranaerofaba is a monotypic genus in the monotypic family of Natranaerofabaceae. The only described species is Natranaerofaba carboxydovora.

== See also ==
- List of bacterial orders
- List of bacteria genera
