= Thermosinus =

Scientific classification
- Domain: Bacteria
- Kingdom: Bacillati
- Phylum: Bacillota
- Class: Negativicutes
- Order: Selenomonadales
- Family: Sporomusaceae
- Genus: Thermosinus; Sokolova et al. 2004
- Species: T. carboxydivorans

Binomial name
- Thermosinus carboxydivorans Sokolova et al. 2004

Genus of bacteria

Thermosinus is a Gram-negative bacteria genus from the family Sporomusaceae. The only species is Thermosinus carboxydivorans.

Thermosinus carboxydivorans is an anaerobic, thermophilic, Gram-negative, carbon-monoxide-oxidizing, hydrogenogenic bacterium. It is facultatively carboxydotrophic, curved, motile, rod-shaped, with a length of 2.6–3 μm, a width of about 0.5 μm and lateral flagellation. Its type strain is Nor1^{T} (=DSM 14886^{T} =VKM B-2281^{T}).
