= Pectinatus =

Scientific classification
- Domain: Bacteria
- Kingdom: Bacillati
- Phylum: Bacillota
- Class: Negativicutes
- Order: Selenomonadales
- Family: Selenomonadaceae
- Genus: Pectinatus; Lee, Mabee & Jangaard 1978

Type species
- Pectinatus cerevisiiphilus Lee, Mabee & Jangaard 1978

Species
- P. brassicae; P. cerevisiiphilus; P. frisingensis; P.s haikarae; P. portalensis; P. sottacetonis

Genus of bacteria

Pectinatus is a genus of Bacillota bacteria classified within the class Negativicutes.

== Phylogeny ==
The currently accepted taxonomy is based on the List of Prokaryotic names with Standing in Nomenclature (LPSN) and National Center for Biotechnology Information (NCBI).

16S rRNA based LTP_10_2024

- Pectinatus
  - - P. frisingensis Schleifer et al. 1990
    - P. portalensis Gonzalez et al. 2005
  - - P. cerevisiiphilus Lee, Mabee & Jangaard 1978
    - - P. haikarae Juvonen and Suihko 2006
      - - P. brassicae Zhang et al. 2012
        - P. sottacetonis Caldwell et al. 2013

120 marker proteins based GTDB 10-RS226

- Pectinatus
  - - P. brassicae
    - P. sottacetonis
  - - P. frisingensis
    - - P. cerevisiiphilus
      - P. haikarae

== See also ==
- List of bacterial orders
- List of bacteria genera
