= Negativicoccus =

Scientific classification
- Domain: Bacteria
- Kingdom: Bacillati
- Phylum: Bacillota
- Class: Negativicutes
- Order: Veillonellales
- Family: Veillonellaceae
- Genus: Negativicoccus; Marchandin et al. 2010

Type species
- Negativicoccus succinicivorans Marchandin et al. 2010

Species
- "N. massiliensis"; N. succinicivorans

Genus of bacteria

Negativicoccus is a Gram-negative and anaerobic genus of bacteria from the family Veillonellaceae.
