= Acetonema =

Scientific classification
- Domain: Bacteria
- Kingdom: Bacillati
- Phylum: Bacillota
- Class: Negativicutes
- Order: Selenomonadales
- Family: Sporomusaceae
- Genus: Acetonema; Kane and Breznak 1992
- Species: A. longum

Binomial name
- Acetonema longum Kane and Breznak 1992

Genus of bacteria

Acetonema is a genus of bacteria in the family Sporomusaceae. It is H_{2}-oxidizing CO_{2}-reducing acetogenic strictly anaerobic endospore-forming Gram-negative motile rod-shaped, isolated from gut contents of the wood-feeding termite Pterotermes occidentis. Cells are catalase positive, oxidase negative, and have 51.5 mol percent G + C in their DNA. Optimum conditions for growth on H_{2} + CO_{2} are at 30–33 degrees C and pH (initial) 7.8. Acetonema longum is the sole species within the genus.
