= Dendrosporobacter =

Scientific classification
- Domain: Bacteria
- Kingdom: Bacillati
- Phylum: Bacillota
- Class: Negativicutes
- Order: Selenomonadales
- Family: Sporomusaceae
- Genus: Dendrosporobacter; Strömpl et al. 2000
- Species: D. quercicolus

Binomial name
- Dendrosporobacter quercicolus (Stankewich et al. 1971) Strompl et al. 2000

Synonyms
- Clostridium quercicolum Stankewich et al. 1971

Genus of bacteria

Dendrosporobacter is a genus in the phylum Bacillota (Bacteria). The only species is Dendrosporobacter quercicolus. Members of the class Negativicutes, stain gram negative, despite being firmicutes.

== Etymology ==
The name Dendrosporobacter derives from:
Greek noun dendron, tree; Greek noun spora (σπορά), a seed, and in biology a spore; Neo-Latin noun, a rod bacter, nominally meaning "a rod", but in effect meaning a bacterium, rod, staff; Neo-Latin masculine gender noun Dendrosporobacter, a spore-bearing rod from a tree.

== Species ==
The genus contains a single species, namely Dendrosporobacter quercicolus; Latin noun quercus, oak; Neo-Latin masculine gender adjective quercicolus, intended to mean associated with oak trees).
