= Anaeromusa =

Scientific classification
- Domain: Bacteria
- Kingdom: Bacillati
- Phylum: Bacillota
- Class: Negativicutes
- Order: Selenomonadales
- Family: Sporomusaceae
- Genus: Anaeromusa; Baena et al. 1999
- Species: A. acidaminophila

Binomial name
- Anaeromusa acidaminophila Nanninga et al. 1987 ex Baena et al. 1999

Type strain
- ATCC 43704, DK glu 16, Dkglu16, DSM 3853, H.J. Nanninga

Synonyms
- "Selenomonas acidaminophila" Nanninga et al. 1987; Anaerovibrio burkinabensis Ouattara et al. 1992; Anaeroarcus burkinensis corrig. (Ouattara et al. 1992) Strompl et al. 1999

Genus of bacteria

Anaeromusa is a Gram-negative and obligately anaerobic bacterial genus from the family Sporomusaceae, with one known species, Anaeromusa acidaminophila. The species was isolated from an anaerobic purification plant.
