= Microecosystem =

Ecosystem limited to a small space

A microecosystem is a multispecies system containing at least two trophic levels and its abiotic surroundings, partly or fully enclosed by artificial boundaries for research purposes.

== Some examples ==
=== Pond microecosystems ===
These microecosystems with limited water volume are often only of temporary duration and hence colonized by organisms which possess a drought-resistant spore stage in the lifecycle, or by organisms which do not need to live in water continuously. The ecosystem conditions applying at a typical pond edge can be quite different from those further from shore. Extremely space-limited water ecosystems can be found in, for example, the water collected in bromeliad leaf bases and the "pitchers" of Nepenthes.

=== Animal gut microecosystems ===
These include the buccal region (especially cavities in the gingiva), rumen, caecum etc. of mammalian herbivores or even invertebrate digestive tracts. In the case of mammalian gastrointestinal microecology, microorganisms such as protozoa, bacteria, as well as curious incompletely defined organisms (such as certain large structurally complex Selenomonads, Quinella ovalis "Quin's Oval", Magnoovum eadii "Eadie's Oval", Oscillospira etc.) can exist in the rumen as incredibly complex, highly enriched mixed populations, (see Moir and Masson images). This type of microecosystem can adjust rapidly to changes in the nutrition or health of the host animal (usually a ruminant such as cow, sheep, goat etc.); see Hungate's "The Rumen and its microbes 1966). Even within a small closed system such as the rumen there may exist a range of ecological conditions: Many organisms live freely in the rumen fluid whereas others require the substrate and metabolic products supplied by the stomach wall tissue with its folds and interstices. Interesting questions are also posed concerning the transfer of the strict anaerobe organisms in the gut microflora/microfauna to the next host generation. Here, mutual licking and coprophagia certainly play important roles.

=== Soil microecosystems ===
A typical soil microecosystem may be restricted to less than a millimeter in its total depth range owing to steep variation in humidity and/or atmospheric gas composition. The soil grain size and physical and chemical properties of the substrate may also play important roles. Because of the predominant solid phase in these systems they are notoriously difficult to study microscopically without simultaneously disrupting the fine spatial distribution of their components.

=== Terrestrial hot-spring microecosystems ===
These are defined by gradients of water temperature, nutrients, dissolved gases, salt concentrations etc. Along the path of terrestrial water flow the resulting temperature gradient continuum alone may provide many different minute microecosystems, starting with thermophilic bacteria such as Archaea "Archaebacteria" (100 °C (212 °F) or more), followed by conventional thermophiles (60–100 °C (140–212 °F)), cyanobacteria (blue-green algae) such as the motile filaments of Oscillatoria (30–60 °C (86–140 °F)), protozoa such as Amoeba, rotifers, then green algae (0–30 °C (32–86 °F)) etc. other factors than temperature also play important roles. Hot springs can provide classic and straightforward ecosystems for microecology studies as well as providing a haven for hitherto undescribed organisms.

=== Deep-sea microecosystems ===
The best known contain rare specialized organisms, found only in the immediate vicinity (sometimes within centimeters) of underwater volcanic vents (or "smokers"). These ecosystems require extremely advanced diving and collection techniques for their scientific exploration.

=== Closed microecosystem ===
One that is sealed and completely independent of outside factors, except for temperature and light. A good example would be a plant contained in a sealed jar and submerged under water. No new factors would be able to enter this ecosystem.
