= Propionispora =

Scientific classification
- Domain: Bacteria
- Kingdom: Bacillati
- Phylum: Bacillota
- Class: Negativicutes
- Order: Selenomonadales
- Family: Sporomusaceae
- Genus: Propionispora; Biebl et al. 2001

Type species
- Propionispora vibrioides Biebl et al. 2001

Species
- Propionispora hippei Abou-Zeid et al. 2004; Propionispora vibrioides Biebl et al. 2001

Genus of bacteria

Propionispora is a genus of Bacillota bacteria classified within the class Negativicutes.
