= Dialister =

Scientific classification
- Domain: Bacteria
- Kingdom: Bacillati
- Phylum: Bacillota
- Class: Negativicutes
- Order: Veillonellales
- Family: Veillonellaceae
- Genus: Dialister; Bergey et al. 1923 ex Moore and Moore 1994

Type species
- Dialister pneumosintes (Olitsky & Gates 1921) Bergey et al. 1923 ex Moore & Moore 1994

Species
- D. histaminiformans; D. hominis; D. invisus; D. micraerophilus; D. pneumosintes; D. propionicifaciens; D. succinatiphilus

Genus of bacteria

Dialister is a genus of Bacillota bacteria classified within the class Negativicutes.

== Phylogeny ==
The currently accepted taxonomy is based on the List of Prokaryotic names with Standing in Nomenclature (LPSN) and National Center for Biotechnology Information (NCBI).

16S rRNA based LTP_10_2024

- Dialister
  - D. micraerophilus Jumas-Bilak et al. 2005
  - - D. propionicifaciens Jumas-Bilak et al. 2005
    - - - D. hominis Sakamoto et al. 2020
        - D. succinatiphilus Morotomi et al. 2008
      - - D. invisus Downes et al. 2003
        - - D. pneumosintes (Olitsky and Gates 1921) Moore and Moore 1994
          - Dialister histaminiformans (Garner et al. 2003) Heng et al. 2025

120 marker proteins based GTDB 10-RS226

- - Allisonella
    - Dialister pneumosintes (type species)
    - Dialister histaminiformans (Garner et al. 2003) Heng et al. 2025 (type species)
  - Dialister
    - D. micraerophilus
    - - D. invisus
      - - Dialister hominis
        - D. succinatiphilus
