= Pelosinus =

Scientific classification
- Domain: Bacteria
- Kingdom: Bacillati
- Phylum: Bacillota
- Class: Negativicutes
- Order: Selenomonadales
- Family: Sporomusaceae
- Genus: Pelosinus; Shelobolina et al. 2007

Type species
- Pelosinus fermentans Shelobolina et al. 2007

Species
- P. baikalensis; P. defluvii; P. fermentans; "Ca. P. lactatifermentans"; P. propionicus

Synonyms
- Sporotalea Boga et al. 2007

Genus of bacteria

Pelosinus is a genus of Bacillota bacteria classified within the class Negativicutes.

== Phylogeny ==
The currently accepted taxonomy is based on the List of Prokaryotic names with Standing in Nomenclature (LPSN) and National Center for Biotechnology Information (NCBI).

16S rRNA based LTP_10_2024

- Pelosinus
  - P. baikalensis Zakharyuk et al. 2024
  - - P. defluvii Moe et al. 2012
    - - P. fermentans Shelobolina et al. 2007
      - P. propionicus (Boga et al. 2007) Moe et al. 2012

120 marker proteins based GTDB 10-RS226

- Pelosinus
  - P. propionicus
  - - P. baikalensis
    - P. fermentans

== See also ==
- List of bacterial orders
- List of bacteria genera
