= Anaeroglobus =

Scientific classification
- Domain: Bacteria
- Kingdom: Bacillati
- Phylum: Bacillota
- Class: Negativicutes
- Order: Veillonellales
- Family: Veillonellaceae
- Genus: Anaeroglobus; Carlier et al. 2002

Type species
- Anaeroglobus geminatus Carlier et al. 2002

Species
- A. geminatus; A. micronuciformis

Genus of bacteria

Anaeroglobus is a Gram-negative, cocci, non-spore-forming, anaerobic and non-motile genus of bacteria from the family of Veillonellaceae with one known species (Anaeroglobus geminatus).

== Phylogeny ==
The currently accepted taxonomy is based on the List of Prokaryotic names with Standing in Nomenclature (LPSN) and National Center for Biotechnology Information (NCBI).

16S rRNA based LTP_10_2024

- Anaeroglobus
  A. geminatus

120 marker proteins based GTDB 10-RS226

- Anaeroglobus
  - "Megasphaera vaginalis" Bordigoni et al. 2020 non Srinivasan et al. 2021
  - - "A. micronuciformis" (Marchandin et al. 2003) Gilroy et al. 2023
    - - "Colibacter massiliensis" Mailhe et al. 2017
      - A. geminatus Carlier et al. 2002

== See also ==
- List of bacterial orders
- List of bacteria genera
