= Natranaerobiaceae =

Scientific classification
- Domain: Bacteria
- Kingdom: Bacillati
- Phylum: Bacillota
- Class: Clostridia
- Order: Natranaerobiales
- Family: Natranaerobiaceae; Mesbah et al. 2007

Genera
- Natranaerobaculum; Natranaerobius; "Natronoanaerobium"; Natronovirga

Family of bacteria

The Natranaerobiaceae are a family of bacteria placed within the class Clostridia. This family contains the thermophilic bacterial species Natranaerobius thermophilus and the related species Natranaerobaculum magadiense.

== Phylogeny ==
16S rRNA based LTP_10_2024

- Natranaerobiaceae
  - Natranaerobaculum Zavarzina et al. 2013
  - - - Natronovirga Mesbah & Wiegel 2009
      - Natranaerofaba Sorokin et al. 2021
    - Natranaerobius Mesbah et al. 2007

120 marker proteins based GTDB 09-RS220

- - Natranaerofabaceae
    Natranaerofaba Sorokin et al. 2021
  - Natranaerobiaceae
    Natranaerobius
