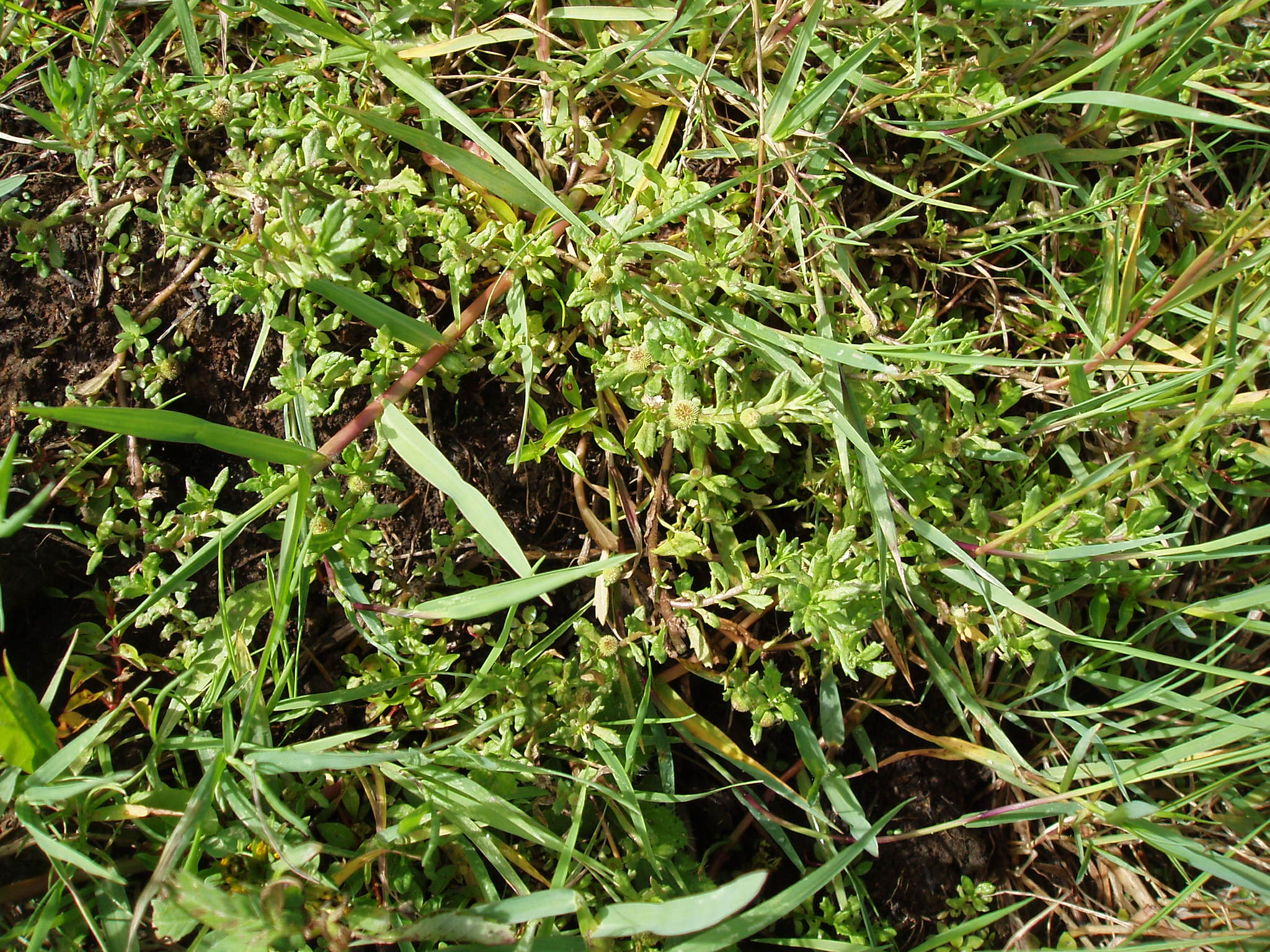

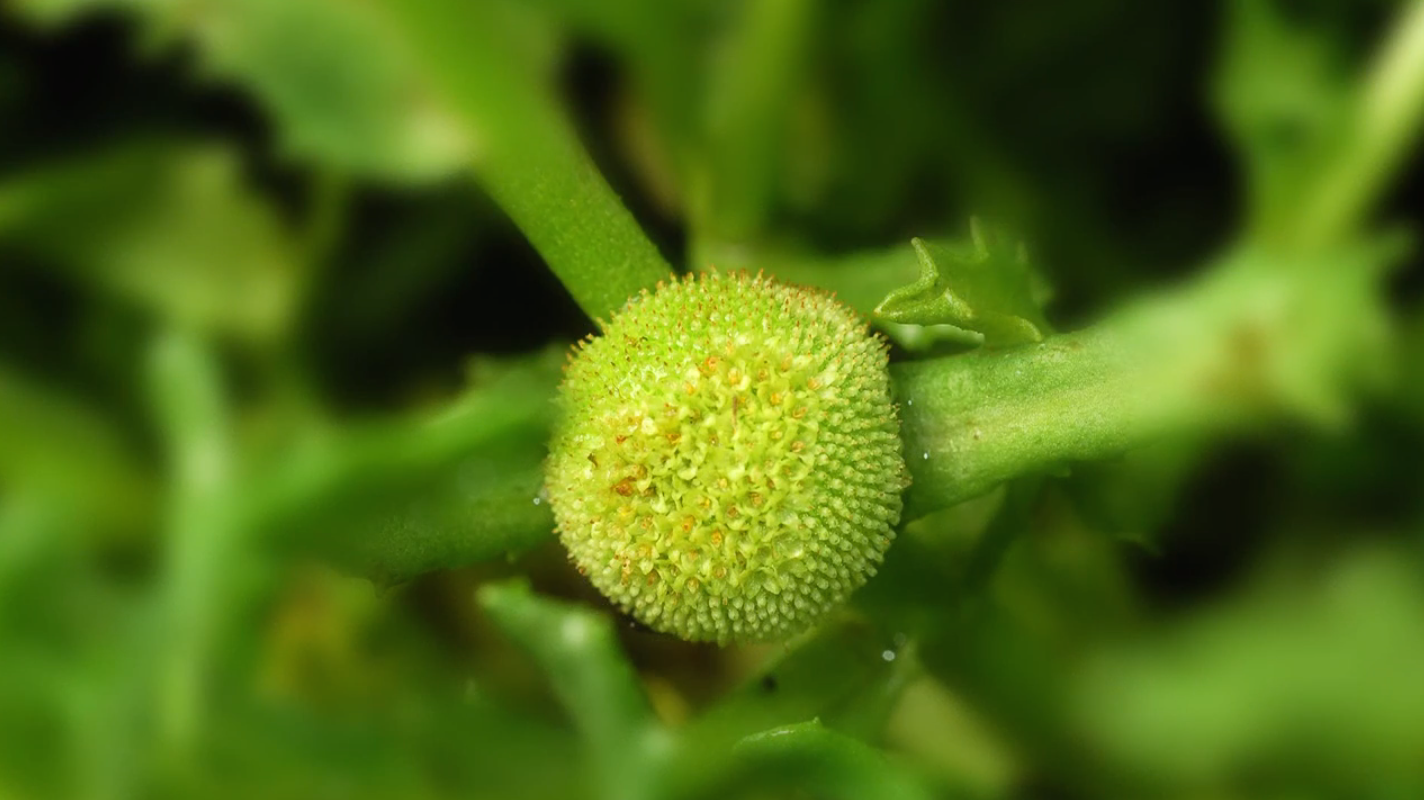
- Inflorescence

Scientific classification
- Kingdom: Plantae
- Clade: Tracheophytes
- Clade: Angiosperms
- Clade: Eudicots
- Clade: Asterids
- Order: Asterales
- Family: Asteraceae
- Genus: Centipeda
- Species: C. cunninghamii

Binomial name
- Centipeda cunninghamii (DC.) A.Braun & Asch.

Synonyms
- Cotula cunninghamii F.Muell. Myriogyne cunninghamii DC.

= Centipeda cunninghamii =

Old man weed

Species of flowering plant

Centipeda cunninghamii is a species of flowering plant in the Asteraceae family. It is referred to by the common names old man weed, being the literal translation of its Koori name gukwonderuk, common sneezeweed and scent weed which were given by European settlers but are increasingly falling out of use. The plant was used by indigenous Australians for its purported medicinal properties. It grows along the Murray River, or generally anywhere there is water, especially low lying or swampy areas. It can be identified by its unique shaped leaf and its pungent scent which is pine-like and minty.

== Taxonomy ==
It was first described in 1838 as Myrriogyne cunninghamii by Candolle. It was redescribed in 1874 by Mueller in as Cotula cuninghamii (an invalid name). In 1867, Alexander Braun and Paul Friedrich August Ascherson transferred it to the new genus, Centipeda, thereby giving the species its currently accepted name of Centipeda cunninghamii.

== Etymology ==
Centipeda is from the Greek word for one hundred feet The epithet cunninghamii honours Allan Cunningham (1791–1839), an English botanist and explorer, who collected the specimen in Candolle's first description, and who is primarily known for his travels to Australia (New South Wales) and New Zealand to collect plants and author of Florae Insularum Novae Zelandiae Precursor, 1837-40 (Introduction to the flora of New Zealand).

== Characteristics ==
Centipeda cunninghamii is an erect or ascending, endemic Australian perennial herb of the Daisy family (Asteraceae), glabrous or rarely woolly, about 20 cm (8 inches) high; stems much-branched.

Leaves: Oblong to more less spathulate, they are about 15 mm (1/2 inch) long and 3–4 mm (1/10 inch) wide; margins shallowly toothed or subentire; narrowed to base but petiole indistinct.

Inflorescence: Tiny green globular flowers, that can also be green, red/pink. Heads sessile, usually solitary, ± globose to biconvex, 4–8 mm (1/5 inch) in diameter; involucral bracts ± obovate, 2–3 mm long, apex obtuse, minutely toothed. Female florets usually 6–8-seriate. Bisexual florets 10–30.

Fruit: Achenes clavate, about 2 mm long, apex rounded and glabrous above ribs.

== Ecology ==
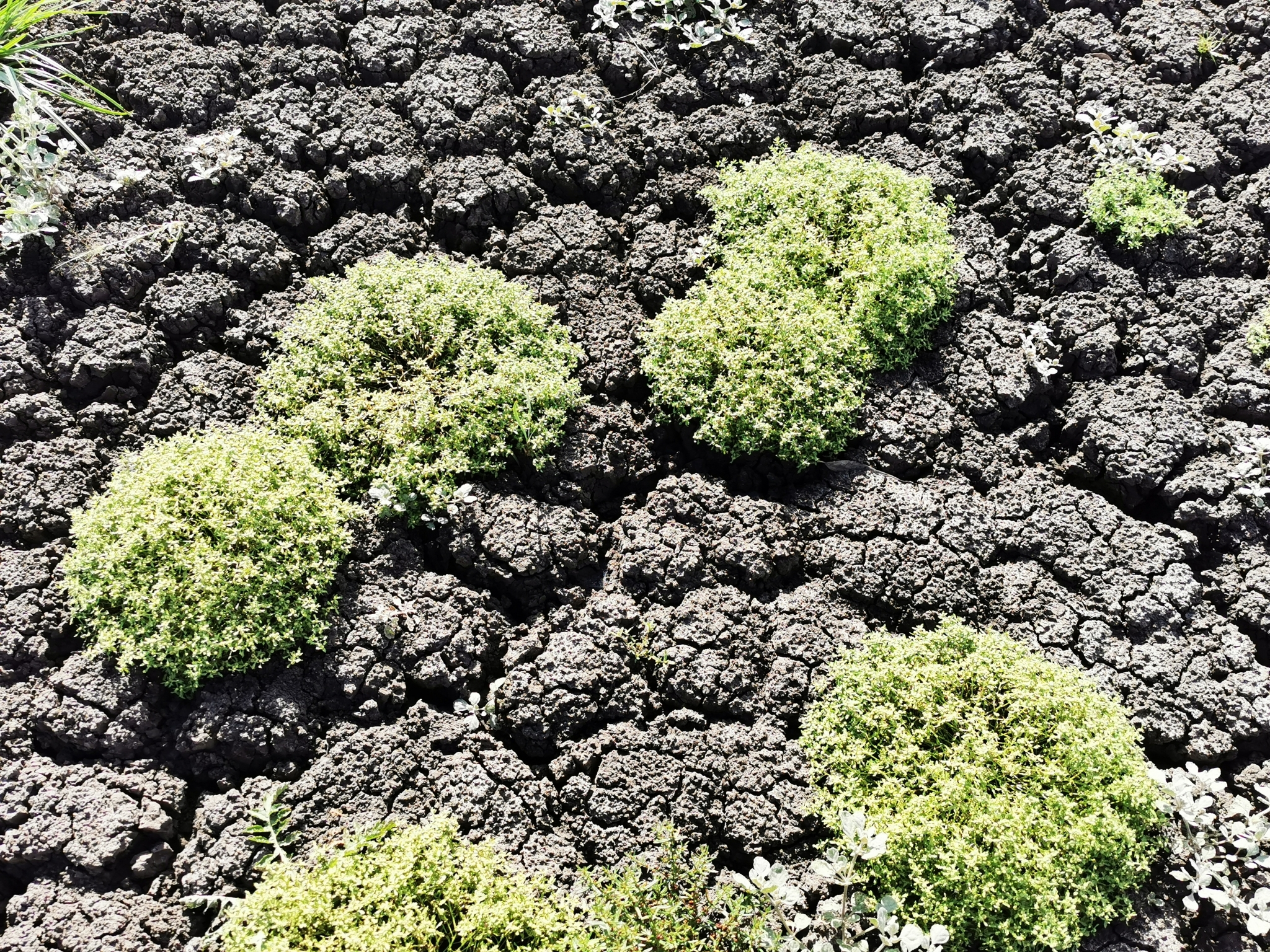
Habitat - dried mud of Narrabri Lagoon

Flowering: mostly spring–autumn. September–February

Fruiting: October–June

Distribution and occurrence: Usually grows in damp areas subject to flooding, on a range of soil types. All subdivisions except NC; all mainland States, New Zealand. New South Wales subdivisions: CC, SC, NT, CT, ST, NWS, CWS, SWS, NWP, SWP, NFWP, SFWP Other Australian states: Qld Vic. Tas. W.A. S.A. N.T. Centipeda cunninghamii has also been encountered in Europe, most likely as a result of inadvertent introduction.

Habitat: Coastal to montane (up to 600 m a.s.l.). Especially common in muddy or silty ground left by receding waters along lake, pond, stream and river margins. Also in muddy hollows within rough pasture, paddocks, tussock grassland, in damp depressions within dune swales and sometimes in similar sites within urban areas.

Propagation Technique: Easily grown from fresh seed and cuttings. Inclined to become invasive.

== Traditional uses ==
Centipeda cunninghamii has a long history of traditional use by Australian Aboriginals for wounds, infections and inflammation. Traditional methods of use most commonly involve binding leaves of the plant directly to the forehead or other parts of the body, so that body heat may release the plants oils which are then absorbed into the skin. It may also be taken orally, sometimes mixing it with emu fat or boiling/soaking it in water to create a tea. In cases of oral ingestion, traditional medicinal authorities have cautioned to carefully regulate the dosage as the plant may be toxic if taken in large amounts.
