= Adrien Certes =

French marine microbiologist

Adrien Certes was a French marine microbiologist considered a pioneer in deep sea microbiology. While he is recognized for his research on deep sea microorganisms, he was first a protistologist and had several scientific publications on protists. Some of his research involved the use of osmic acid for preserving infusoria and research on frog endosymbionts. Certes deep-sea research explored whether microorganisms grew and inhabited the harsh conditions of the deep ocean, as well as if organic matter was able to decompose in those same conditions. His research was a part of the development of marine microbiology and understanding microbial life within the deep ocean.

== Early life ==
Marie Louise Adolphe Adrien Certes was born in 1835 in Paris, France He was destined to go into the government as a civil servant like his father. At first, Certes attended law school, but then followed in his father's steps and was working in the ministry of finance as supernumerary by the age of 23 and worked his way up the ladder. He achieved the highest rank in finance, Inspecteur Générale des Finances, and solidified his standing as a highly respected member of society. Certes married Marie Depaul in 1865. They had one child together seven years after their marriage, a daughter, Marie Madeleine. Although Certes had a true talent for the world of finance, he also had one for microbiology.

Adrien Certes on the left age 31, and on the right age 53

== Academic career ==
Although Adrien Certes is commonly cited as a biologist today, originally, he was a well-established civil servant in France. It wasn't until Certes published his first work, a report titled “Phylloxera et le Budget” at age 42, that he began to gain some recognition for his interest in biology. In his report Certes cited the work of Édouard-Gérard Balbiani, a well-known biologist and protistologist at the time. Although it is not known if Certes was already in communication with Balbiani at the time of writing Phylloxera et le Budget, he later called him his 'friend and master' and they even worked together on protist research early in Certes' career.

Although Certes was originally trained by a protistologist and did continue to produce research on protists, he is most widely recognized today for his work in marine microbiology. Milne Edwards another prominent figure at the time named Certes the expert on infusoria and protozoa in 1881 for multiple deep-sea expeditions on the Travailleur and Talisman. Certes produced some of the first ever cultures of deep-sea bacteria and conducted extensive research on the effects of pressure on bacteria, protists, and yeasts collected from those expeditions. His research was conducted in the laboratory of another prominent figure, Louis Pasteur, and in fact Certes' first publications were presented at the Academy of France by Louis Pasteur himself, and later Milne Edwards. His early work earned him some recognition in the French biology community, and he was quickly nominated to the Société Zoologique. Throughout his career Certes published 20 papers in the Société Zoologique journal and was eventually elected president in 1887 and remained an active board member until his death in 1903.
