= Quinella ovalis =

Scientific classification
- Domain: Bacteria
- Kingdom: Bacillati
- Phylum: Bacillota
- Class: Negativicutes
- Order: Veillonellales
- Family: Veillonellaceae
- Genus: Quinella; Krumholz et al. 1993
- Species: Q. ovalis

Binomial name
- Quinella ovalis Krumholz et al. 1993

Species of bacterium

Quinella is a genus of bacteria in the Veillonellaceae family. Its only species, Quinella ovalis, is an extremely large motile rumen anaerobic prokaryote previously known as "Quin's Oval".

In the illustrated atlas of sheep rumen organisms of Moir and Masson, their organism no. 3 represents Quinella ovalis.
