= Lucifera butyrica =

Scientific classification
- Domain: Bacteria
- Kingdom: Bacillati
- Phylum: Bacillota
- Class: Negativicutes
- Order: Selenomonadales
- Family: Sporomusaceae
- Genus: Lucifera; Sánchez-Andrea et al., 2019
- Species: L. butyrica

Binomial name
- Lucifera butyrica Sánchez-Andrea et al., 2019

Species of bacteria

Lucifera is a genus of bacteria in the Sporomusaceae family. Sanchez-Andrea et al. in 2018 described a novel species of a novel genus, for which they proposed the name Lucifera butyrica.

== Etymology ==
The name Lucifera, Latin for "Light-bringing", refers to the bacterium's shape which is like a match, and the old term "Lucifer" for a match.
