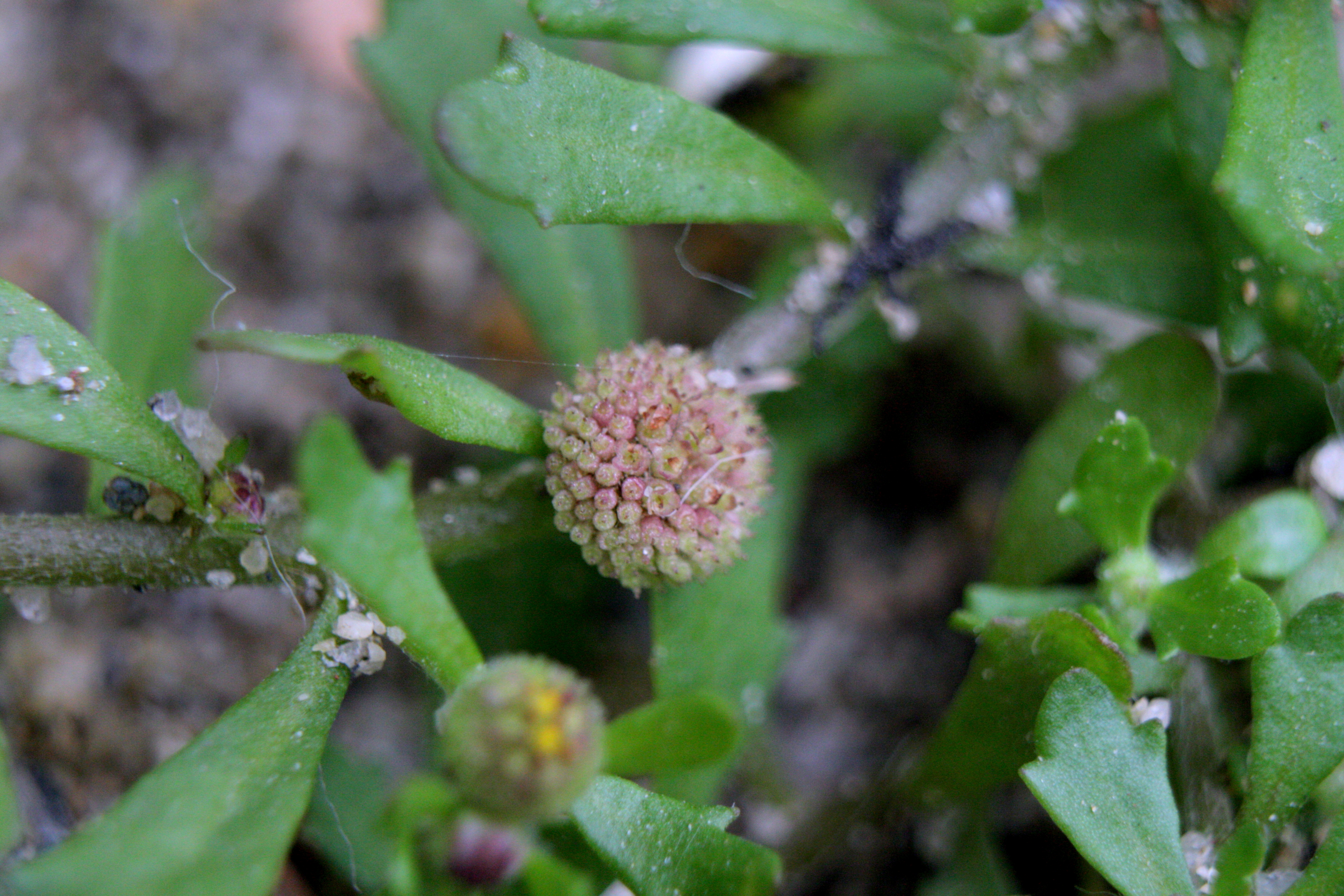
- Centipeda minima

Scientific classification
- Kingdom: Plantae
- Clade: Embryophytes
- Clade: Tracheophytes
- Clade: Angiosperms
- Clade: Eudicots
- Clade: Asterids
- Order: Asterales
- Family: Asteraceae
- Subfamily: Asteroideae
- Tribe: Athroismeae
- Genus: Centipeda; Lour.

Synonyms
- Cotula sect. Centipeda (Lour.) Baill.; Centipeda sect. Sphaeromorphaea (DC.) DC. ex C.B.Clarke; Myriogyne Less.; Centipeda sect. Myriogyne (Less.) C.B.Clarke

= Centipeda =

Genus of flowering plants

Centipeda is a genus of flowering plants in the daisy family, Asteraceae. The genus is primarily native to Australia and New Zealand, with a few species extending the range northward into Asia and across the Pacific to southern South America.

== Species ==
- Centipeda aotearoana N.G.Walsh
- Centipeda borealis N.G.Walsh
- Centipeda crateriformis N.G.Walsh
- Centipeda crateriformis subsp. compacta N.G.Walsh
- Centipeda cunninghamii (DC.) A.Braun & Asch.
- Centipeda elatinoides (Less.) Benth. & Hook.f. ex O.Hoffm.
- Centipeda minima (L.) A.Braun & Asch.
- Centipeda minima subsp. macrocephala N.G.Walsh
- Centipeda nidiformis N.G.Walsh
- Centipeda pleiocephala N.G.Walsh
- Centipeda racemosa (Hook.) F.Muell.
- Centipeda thespidioides F.Muell.

== Research and biological activities ==
Volatile oils from Centipeda minima have been shown to modulate anti-inflammatory action by inhibiting inflammatory cytokines in a rat model. In a related study, C. minima eased allergic rhinitis by slowing the infiltration of eosinophils and the proliferation of mast cells.

A comprehensive investigation of the GC-MS chemical profile of C. cunninghamii and its biological activity showed that this species' extract contains novel compounds that possess anti-inflammatory and antioxidant properties.

== Phylogeny ==
In 2012, Nylinder et al. published an estimation of the species tree phylogeny of the Australian/New Zealand genus Centipeda (Asteraceae) based on nucleotide sequence data. Centipeda racemosa (snuffweed) is the sister to remaining species, which is also the only consistently perennial representative in the genus. Centipeda pleiocephala (tall sneezeweed) and C. nidiformis (cotton sneezeweed) constitute a species pair, as does C. borealis and C. minima (spreading sneezeweed), all sharing the symplesiomorphic characters of spherical capitulum and convex receptacle with C. racemosa. Another species group comprising C. thespidioides (desert sneezeweed), Centipeda cunninghamii (old man weed, or common sneezeweed), C. crateriformis is well supported but then include the morphologically aberrant C. aotearoana, all sharing the character of having capitula that mature more slowly relative the subtending shoot. Centipeda elatinoides takes on a weakly supported intermediate position between the two mentioned groups, and is difficult to relate to any of the former groups based on morphological characters.
