= Veillonellaceae =

Scientific classification
- Domain: Bacteria
- Kingdom: Bacillati
- Phylum: Bacillota
- Class: Negativicutes
- Order: Veillonellales
- Family: Veillonellaceae; Rogosa 1971

Genera
- Allisonella; Anaeroglobus; "Caecibacter"; "Colibacter"; Dialister; Megasphaera; Negativicoccus; Veillonella

Family of bacteria

The Veillonellaceae are a family of the Clostridia, formerly known as Acidaminococcaceae. Bacteria in this family are grouped together mainly based on genetic studies, which place them among the Bacillota. Supporting this placement, several species are capable of forming endospores. However, they differ from most other Bacillota in having Gram-negative stains. The cell wall composition is peculiar.

Members of this family are all obligate anaerobes, and occur in habitats such as rivers, lakes, and the intestines of vertebrates. They range from spherical forms, such as Megasphaera and Veillonella, to curved rods, as typified by the Selenomonads. Selenomonas has a characteristic crescent-shape, with flagella inserted on the concave side, while Sporomusa is similar but non-motile. Their names refer to this distinctive morphology: selene means moon, and musa means banana.

The name Selenobacteria also refers to some this group.

The description of this family was emended in 2010 and, together with the Acidaminococcaceae (familia nova, which means a newly coined taxa), it was placed in the order Selenomonadales (ordo novus) in the class Negativicutes (classis novus) of the phylum Bacillota.

== Phylogeny ==
The currently accepted taxonomy is based on the List of Prokaryotic names with Standing in Nomenclature (LPSN) and National Center for Biotechnology Information (NCBI).

16S rRNA based LTP_10_2024

- Veillonellaceae
  - Veillonella
  - - - Negativicoccus
      - Dialister [incl. Allisonella]
    - Megasphaera [incl. Anaeroglobus]

120 marker proteins based GTDB 10-RS226

- Veillonellales
  - - Negativicoccaceae
      Negativicoccus Marchandin et al. 2010
    - Dialisteraceae
      - Dialister Bergey et al. 1923 ex Moore & Moore 1994 [incl. Allisonella]
      - Dialister species-grooup 2
  - - Megasphaeraceae
      - Megasphaera_C
      - - - "Caecibacter" Ricaboni et al. 2017
          - - Megasphaera paucivorans Juvonen & Suihko 2006
            - Anaeroglobus Carlier et al. 2002
        - Megasphaera Rogosa 1971
    - Veillonellaceae
      Veillonella Prévot 1933

== See also ==
- List of bacteria genera
- List of bacterial orders
