= Natranaerobiales =

Scientific classification
- Domain: Bacteria
- Kingdom: Bacillati
- Phylum: Bacillota
- Class: Clostridia
- Order: Natranaerobiales; Mesbah et al. 2007

Families
- Natranaerobiaceae; Natranaerofabaceae

Order of bacteria

The Natranaerobiales are an order of bacteria placed within the class Clostridia. This order contains the thermophilic bacterial species Natranaerobius thermophilus and the related species Natranaerobaculum magadiense.

== See also ==
- List of bacterial orders
- List of bacteria genera
