= Selenomonadales =

Scientific classification
- Domain: Bacteria
- Kingdom: Bacillati
- Phylum: Bacillota
- Class: Negativicutes
- Order: Selenomonadales; Marchandin et al. 2010

Families
- Acetonemataceae; Anaeromusaceae; Dendrosporobacteraceae; Propionisporaceae; Selenomonadaceae; Sporomusaceae; Thermosinaceae

Synonyms
- Anaeromusales Chuvochina et al. 2024; Propionisporales Chuvochina et al. 2024; "Sporomusales" Cavalier-Smith 2006

Order of bacteria

The Selenomonadales are an order of bacteria within the class Negativicutes; unlike most other members of Bacillota, they are Gram-negative. The phylogeny of this order was initially determined by 16S rRNA comparisons. More recently, molecular markers in the form of conserved signature indels (CSIs) have been found specific for all Selenomonadales species. On the basis of these markers, the Selenomonadales are inclusive of two distinct families, and are no longer the sole order within the Negativicutes. Several CSIs have also been found specific for both families, Sporomusaceae and Selenomonadceae. Samples of bacterial strains within this order have been isolated from the root canals of healthy human teeth.

== Phylogeny ==
The currently accepted taxonomy is based on the List of Prokaryotic names with Standing in Nomenclature (LPSN) and National Center for Biotechnology Information (NCBI).

16S rRNA based LTP_10_2024

- Selenomonadales
  - - Sporomusaceae
      - Pelorhabdus
      - - Anaerosporomusa
        - - - Sporolituus
            - Thermosinus
          - - - - Anaeromusa
                - Anaeroarcus
              - Pelosinus
            - - - Lucifera
                - Propionispora
              - - - Anaerospora
                  - Dendrosporobacter
                - - - Acetonema
                    - Methylomusa
                  - Sporomusa
  - - Veillonellaceae
    - - Selenomonadaceae
        - - Anaerosinus Strömpl et al. 1999
          - Propionispira
        - - - Megamonas
            - Pectinatus
          - - Selenomonas~1 [incl. Centipeda]
            - - - Anaerovibrio
                - Schwartzia
              - Selenomonas [incl. Mitsuokella; Selenomastix]

120 marker proteins based GTDB 10-RS226

- - - - "Sporomusales"
        - - DSM‑15969
            Anaerospora Woo et al. 2005
          - Thermosinaceae
            Thermosinus Sokolova et al. 2004 [Sporolituus Ogg and Patel 2009]
        - - - "Luciferaceae"
              Lucifera Sanchez-Andrea et al. 2018
          - - Acetonemataceae
              - Anaerosporomusa Choi et al. 2016
              - Acetonema Kane and Breznak 1992
            - Sporomusaceae
              - Methylomusa Amano et al. 2018
              - Sporomusa Möller et al. 1985
    - - - UMGS1260
          - UMGS1260
            Pelorhabdus Grässle et al. 2022
      - - - SG130
            - SG130
              "Azotosporobacter" Xie et al. 2024
          - Anaeromusales
            - Anaeromusaceae
              Anaeromusa Baena et al. 1999 (incl. Anaeroarcus Strömpl et al. 1999)
        - - - DSM‑13327
              - "Pelosinaceae"
                Pelosinus Shelobolina et al. 2007
          - - - - "Dendrosporobacterales"
                  - Dendrosporobacteraceae
                    Dendrosporobacter Strömpl et al. 2000
              - - FLKF01
                  - "Massilibacillaceae"
                    "Massilibacillus" Tidjani Alou et al. 2017
                - ICN‑92133
                  - ICN‑92133
                    Anaerosinus Strömpl et al. 1999 (incl. ?Selenobaculum Yeo et al. 2024)
            - - Propionisporales
                - Propionisporaceae
                  Propionispora Biebl et al. 2001
  - - Veillonellales
      - - - Negativicoccaceae
          - Dialisteraceae
        - Megasphaeraceae
      - Veillonellaceae
    - Selenomonadales
      - Selenomonadaceae
        - - Megamonas Shah and Collins 1983
          - Pectinatus Lee et al. 1978
        - - Propionispira Schink et al. 1983
          - - Schwartzia Gylswyk et al. 1997
            - - Anaerovibrio Hungate 1966
              - - Selenomonas s.s. von Prowazek 1913
                - - Quinella Krumholz et al. 1993
                  - - Centipeda Lai et al. 1983
                    - - Selenomonas bovis Zhang & Dong 2009
                      - - "Selenomastix" Woodcock & Lapage 1913
                        - Mitsuokella Shah & Collins 1983
