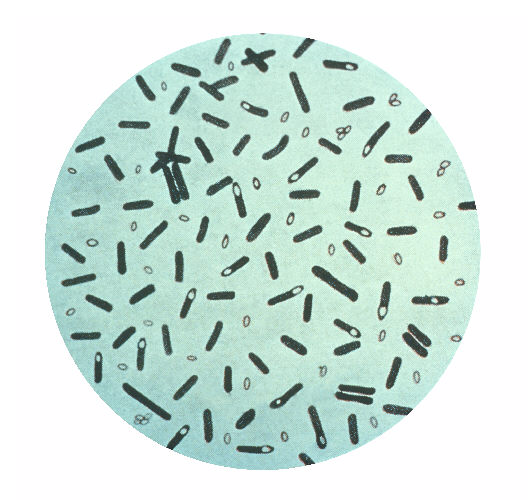
- Clostridium botulinum

Scientific classification
- Domain: Bacteria
- Kingdom: Bacillati
- Phylum: Bacillota
- Class: Clostridia; Rainey 2010

Groups included
- Acetivibrionales; Caldicellulosiruptorales; Caldicoprobacterales; Christensenellales; Clostridiales; Desulfitibacterales; Eubacteriales; Halanaerobiales; Koleobacterales; Lachnospirales; Lutisporales; Mahellales; Monoglobales; Natranaerobiales; "Oscillospirales"; Peptostreptococcales; "Saccharofermentanales"; Thermoanaerobacterales; Thermosediminibacterales; Tissierellales

Cladistically included but traditionally excluded taxa
- Bacilli; Culicoidibacteria; Erysipelotrichia; Limnochordia; Negativicutes; Syntrophomonadia; Thermaerobacteria; Thermolithobacteria; "Ca. Borkfalkiales"; "Ca. Avidehalobacter"; Caecibacterium; Caldinitratiruptor; Capillibacterium; "Ca. Carbonibacillus"; "Ca. Desulfobacillus"; "Ca. Ferrisolea"; "Ca. Heliomonas"; Negativibacillus

Synonyms
- "Clostridiia" Cavalier-Smith 2020; Tissierellia Alauzet et al. 2014

= Clostridia =

Class of bacteria

The Clostridia are a highly polyphyletic class of Bacillota, including Clostridium and other similar genera. They are distinguished from the Bacilli by lacking aerobic respiration. They are obligate anaerobes, meaning that oxygen is toxic to them. Species of the class Clostridia are often but not always Gram-positive (see Halanaerobium) and have the ability to form spores. Studies show they are not a monophyletic group, and their relationships are not entirely certain. Currently, most are placed in a single order called Clostridiales, but this is not a natural group and is likely to be redefined in the future.

Most species of the genus Clostridium are saprophytic organisms that ferment plant polysaccharides and are found in many places in the environment, most notably the soil. However, the genus does contain some human pathogens (outlined below). The toxins produced by certain members of the genus Clostridium are among the most dangerous known. Examples are tetanus toxin (known as tetanospasmin) produced by C. tetani and botulinum toxin produced by C. botulinum. Some species have been isolated from women with bacterial vaginosis.

== Species ==
Notable species of this class include:

- Clostridium perfringens (gangrene, food poisoning)
- Clostridioides difficile (pseudomembranous colitis)
- Clostridium tetani (tetanus)
- Clostridium botulinum (botulism)
- Clostridium acetobutylicum (acetone–butanol–ethanol fermentation, or ABE process)
- Clostridium haemolyticum
- Clostridium novyi (gas gangrene, infectious necrotic hepatitis)
  - Clostridium oedematiens (synonym of Clostridium novyi)
- Clostridium phytofermentans (biomass fermentation)

Heliobacteria and Christensenella are also members of the class Clostridia.

Some of the enzymes produced by this group are used in bioremediation.

== Phylogeny ==
The currently accepted taxonomy is based on the List of Prokaryotic names with Standing in Nomenclature (LPSN) and National Center for Biotechnology Information (NCBI)

16S rRNA based LTP_10_2024

- "Clostridiia" s.l. {Bacillota_A}
  - - - - Peptococcales
        - "Proteinivoracales"
      - Eubacteriales
    - - - - - Limnochordales
            - "Capillibacteriales"
          - - Sulfobacillales
            - - Symbiobacteriales
              - Thermaerobacterales
        - - - Dethiobacterales
            - Natranaerobiales
          - - Gelria
            - - - Koleobacterales
                - - Caldicellulosiruptorales
                  - "Caldanaerobiales"
              - - - Thermacetogeniales
                  - Carboxydothermales
                - - - - Desulfovirgulaceae
                      - Ammonificales
                    - - "Brockiales"
                      - - Dictyoglomerales
                        - Thermosediminibacterales
                  - Thermoanaerobacterales
      - - Tissierellales 1
        - - Tissierellales
          - Peptostreptococcales
  - - - Thermolithobacterales
      - Carboxydocellales
    - - - - - Desulfitibacterales
            - Desulfitisporales
          - - - Calderihabitantales
              - Moorellales
            - - Zhaonellaceae
              - Syntrophomonadales
        - - - - - "Thermanaerosceptrales"
                - Thermincolales
              - - "Heliobacteriales"
                - Desulfitobacteriales
            - Desulfotomaculales
          - - Halanaerobiales [incl. "Anoxybacterales", Halobacteroidales]
            - - "Hydrogenisporales"
              - Selenomonadales [incl. Acidaminococcales, Anaeromusales, "Dendrosporobacterales", Propionisporales, "Sporomusales", Veillonellales]
      - - - - Gracilibacteraceae
            - Lutisporales
          - Clostridiales
        - - - Christensenellales
            - - Aristaeellaceae
              - - Mahellales
                - Caldicoprobacterales
          - - - Monoglobales [incl. "Petroclostridiales"]
              - - Acetivibrionales [incl. "Saccharofermentanales", "Thermoclostridiaceae"]
                - "Oscillospirales"
            - Lachnospirales

120 marker proteins based GTDB 09-RS220

- - - Bacillota G
      - Limnochordia
        Limnochordales
      - "Hydrogenisporia"
        - "Capillibacteriales"
        - "Hydrogenisporales"
  - - - Bacillota E
        - - UBA3575
            "Ca. Acetocimmeria"
        - - - Thermaerobacteria
              Thermaerobacterales
          - - Symbiobacteriia
              Symbiobacteriales
            - Sulfobacillia
              Sulfobacillales
    - - - - "Selenobacteria"
            - "Selenomonadia"
              - Veillonellales
              - - Acidaminococcales
                - - Sporomusales_A
                  - - - Lucifera {UPPP01}
                      - Sporomusales C
                    - - "Sporomusales"
                      - - - Pelosinus {UMGS1260}
                          - Propionisporales
                        - - Anaeromusales
                          - - "Dendrosporobacterales"
                            - Selenomonadales
          - "Desulfotomaculota"
            - - - - Peptococcia
                    - "Thermanaerosceptrales"
                    - Peptococcales
                  - "Dehalobacteriia"
                    - - "Avidehalobacterales"
                      - "Cryptoclostridiales"
                    - "Dehalobacteriales"
                - - Desulfitobacteriia
                    - "Heliobacteriales"
                    - Desulfitobacteriales
              - - - "Moorellia"
                    - Zhaonellaceae {DULZ01}
                    - - Desulfitibacterales
                      - - Calderihabitantales
                        - Moorellales
                - - DSM‑12270
                    Thermacetogeniales
                  - Syntrophomonadia
                    Syntrophomonadales
            - - - "Carboxydocellia"
                  Carboxydocellales
                - Thermincolia
                  Thermincolales
              - - "Carboxydothermia"
                  Carboxydothermales
                - Desulfotomaculia
                  - Ammonificales
                  - Desulfotomaculales
        - - - Bacillota D
              - - "Proteinivoracia"
                  "Proteinivoracales"
              - - "Dethiobacteria"
                  - "Ca. Contubernalis" {SKNC01}
                  - "Dethiobacterales"
                - Natranaerobiia
                  Natranaerobiales
          - - "Halanaerobiaeota"
              - "Halanaerobiia"
                - "Anoxybacterales"
                - - Halanaerobiales
                  - Halobacteroidales
            - Bacillota A
              - - Thermosediminibacteria
                  - Koleobacterales
                  - Thermosediminibacterales
              - - "Thermoanaerobacteria"
                  - Caldicellulosiruptorales
                  - Thermoanaerobacterales
                - "Clostridiia" s.s.
                  - - Mahellales
                    - Caldicoprobacterales
                  - - - - Lutisporales
                        - Clostridiales
                      - - Eubacteriales
                        - - Tissierellales
                          - Peptostreptococcales
                    - - Christensenellales
                      - - - - "Merdicolales"
                            - - - "Egerieisomatales"
                                - "Saccharofermentanales"
                              - - "Thermoclostridiaceae"
                                - Acetivibrionales
                          - - - - "Petroclostridiales"
                                - Monoglobales
                              - - "Qingrenia" {UMGS1810}
                                - "Avimonoglobales"
                            - "Oscillospirales"
                        - Lachnospirales
      - - Bacillota s.s.
          "Bacillia" [incl. Alicyclobacillia; Desulfuribacillia; Culicoidibacteria]

== Epidemiology ==
Since they are commonly found in soils and in microbiota of humans and animals, Clostridia wounds and infections are found worldwide. Host defenses against the microbe are nearly absent, and very little innate immunity exists, if any. Clostridia can be diagnosed by recognizing the characteristics of the lesion of the infection along with Gram stains of the tissue and bacterial culture. Although the body does not have adequate defenses alone, this microbe can be controlled with the help of antibiotics, like penicillin, and tissue debridement for the more severe cases.

== Clostridia and health ==
Clostridia bacteria are commonly found in the gut microbiome.

=== Clostridioides difficile ===
Overuse of antibiotics can cause imbalance of the gut microbiome, leading to overgrowth of the species Clostridioides difficile causing a serious infection (CDI). Effects of this infection include severe diarrhea and the severity of many bowel related diseases is also increased as a result of the infection. Other Clostridium bacteria in the gut have been linked to brain connectivity and healthy function.

Patients that have been subjected to fecal microbiota transplants to treat their CDI have seen improvements in their mood and mental health. This preliminary research seems to suggest a tentative link between the presence of Clostridia in the gut microbiome and overall mental health, with gut microbiome transplants as an avenue of future research into novel treatments for certain psychiatric disorders.
