= Negativicutes =

Scientific classification
- Domain: Bacteria
- Kingdom: Bacillati
- Phylum: Bacillota
- Class: Negativicutes; Marchandin et al. 2010

Orders
- Acidaminococcales; Anaeromusales; Propionisporales; Selenomonadales; Veillonellales

Synonyms
- "Selenomonadia" Oren, Parte & Garrity 2016; "Selenobacteria" Cavalier-Smith 1992 stat. nov. Cavalier-Smith 2006

Class of bacteria

The Negativicutes are a class of bacteria in the phylum Bacillota, whose members have a peculiar cell wall with a lipopolysaccharide outer membrane which stains gram-negative, unlike most other members of the Bacillota. Although several neighbouring Clostridia species (firmicute bacteria) also stain gram-negative, the proteins responsible for the unusual diderm structure of the Negativicutes may have actually been laterally acquired from Pseudomonadota (formerly Proteobacteria). Additional research is required to confirm the origin of the diderm cell envelope in the Negativicutes.

Most members of this class are obligate anaerobes, and occur in habitats such as rivers, lakes, and the intestines of vertebrates. They range from spherical forms, such as Megasphaera and Veillonella, to curved rods, as typified by the selenomonads. Selenomonas has a characteristic crescent shape, with flagella inserted on the concave side, while Sporomusa is similar, but nonmotile. Their names refer to this distinctive morphology: selene means moon, and musa means banana.

== Taxonomy ==
The class currently consists of 32 validly named genera across three orders and four families. The orders Veillonellales and Acidaminococcales each contain a single family, Veillonellaceae and Acidaminococcaceae, respectively, while the order Selenomonadales contains two families, Selenomonadaceae and Sporomusaceae.

== Molecular signatures ==
Historically, the Negativicutes consisted of a single order, the Selenomonadales, and two families, Veillonellaceae and Acidaminococcaceae based on 16S rRNA gene sequence similarity. However, these groupings did not include several members within the Negativicutes that branched outside of the two families. The current taxonomic view is inclusive of these members who have been validly assigned to the families Selenomonadaceae and Sporomusaceae within the emended Selenomonadales order. Molecular markers in the form of conserved signature indels (CSIs) and proteins (CSPs) justify the present taxonomic divisions. These molecular markers are found at each taxonomic rank, and their distribution is in agreement with the observed phylogenetic branching.

Many works have implicated that the Negativicutes should be reclassified as an order within the class Clostridia, based on close phylogenetic branching, and the observation that the spore-forming members of the Negativicutes share similar sporulation genes as the Clostridia, and that both stain gram-negative. However, the heterogeneity of members within the Negativicutes, as well as the distribution of molecular signatures, supports the view that the Negativicutes are in fact an independent class within the Bacillota, with Clostridia as their closest phylogenetic neighbours. Additionally, several CSIs and CSPs have been found to be uniquely shared among all Negativicutes, while no CSIs have been found to be shared by both Negativicutes and Clostridia.

== Phylogeny ==
The currently accepted taxonomy is based on the List of Prokaryotic names with Standing in Nomenclature (LPSN) and National Center for Biotechnology Information (NCBI).

16S rRNA based LTP_10_2024

- - Acidaminococcales
    - Acidaminococcaceae
      - Succinispira
      - - Acidaminococcus
        - - Phascolarctobacterium
          - - Phascolarctobacterium faecium
            - Succiniclasticum
  - Selenomonadales
    - - Sporomusaceae
        - Pelorhabdus
        - - Anaerosporomusa
          - - - Sporolituus
              - Thermosinus
            - - - - Anaeromusa
                  - Anaeroarcus
                - Pelosinus
              - - - Lucifera
                  - Propionispora
                - - - Anaerospora
                    - Dendrosporobacter
                  - - - Acetonema
                      - Methylomusa
                    - Sporomusa
    - - Veillonellaceae
        - Veillonella
        - - - Negativicoccus
            - Dialister [incl. Allisonella]
          - Megasphaera [incl. Anaeroglobus]
      - Selenomonadaceae
        - - Anaerosinus
          - Propionispira
        - - - Megamonas
            - Pectinatus
          - - Selenomonas~1 [incl. Centipeda]
            - - - Anaerovibrio
                - Schwartzia
              - Selenomonas [incl. Mitsuokella; "Selenomastix"]

120 marker proteins based GTDB 10-RS226

- - - Acidaminococcales
      - Succinispiraceae
        Succinispira Janssen and O'Farrell 1999
      - Acidaminococcaceae
        - - "Ca. Avacidaminococcus" Gilroy et al. 2021
          - Acidaminococcus Rogosa 1969
        - - - "Ca. Fusicatenibacter intestinipullorum" Gilroy et al. 2021
            - Phascolarctobacterium Del Dot et al. 1994
          - - Succiniclasticum van Gylswyk 1995
            - - "Ca. Phascolarctobacterium caballi" Gilroy et al. 2022
              - Phascolarctobacterium succinatutens Watanabe et al. 2012
  - - - - "Sporomusales"
          - - DSM‑15969
              Anaerospora Woo et al. 2005
            - Thermosinaceae
              Thermosinus Sokolova et al. 2004 [Sporolituus Ogg and Patel 2009]
          - - - "Luciferaceae"
                Lucifera Sanchez-Andrea et al. 2018
            - - Acetonemataceae
                - Anaerosporomusa Choi et al. 2016
                - Acetonema Kane and Breznak 1992
              - Sporomusaceae
                - Methylomusa Amano et al. 2018
                - Sporomusa Möller et al. 1985
      - - - UMGS1260
            - UMGS1260
              Pelorhabdus Grässle et al. 2022
        - - - SG130
              - SG130
                "Azotosporobacter" Xie et al. 2024
            - Anaeromusales
              - Anaeromusaceae
                Anaeromusa Baena et al. 1999 (incl. Anaeroarcus Strömpl et al. 1999)
          - - - DSM‑13327
                - "Pelosinaceae"
                  Pelosinus Shelobolina et al. 2007
            - - - - "Dendrosporobacterales"
                    - Dendrosporobacteraceae
                      Dendrosporobacter Strömpl et al. 2000
                - - FLKF01
                    - "Massilibacillaceae"
                      "Massilibacillus" Tidjani Alou et al. 2017
                  - ICN‑92133
                    - ICN‑92133
                      Anaerosinus Strömpl et al. 1999 (incl. ?Selenobaculum Yeo et al. 2024)
              - - Propionisporales
                  - Propionisporaceae
                    Propionispora Biebl et al. 2001
    - - Veillonellales
        - - - Negativicoccaceae
              Negativicoccus Marchandin et al. 2010
            - Dialisteraceae
              - Dialister Bergey et al. 1923 ex Moore & Moore 1994 [incl. Allisonella]
              - Dialister species-grooup 2
          - - Megasphaeraceae
              - Megasphaera_C
              - - - "Caecibacter" Ricaboni et al. 2017
                  - - Megasphaera paucivorans Juvonen & Suihko 2006
                    - Anaeroglobus Carlier et al. 2002
                - Megasphaera Rogosa 1971
        - - Veillonellaceae
            Veillonella Prévot 1933
      - Selenomonadales
        - Selenomonadaceae
          - - Megamonas Shah and Collins 1983
            - Pectinatus Lee et al. 1978
          - - Propionispira Schink et al. 1983
            - - Schwartzia Gylswyk et al. 1997
              - - Anaerovibrio Hungate 1966
                - - Selenomonas s.s. von Prowazek 1913
                  - - Quinella Krumholz et al. 1993
                    - - Centipeda Lai et al. 1983
                      - - Selenomonas bovis Zhang & Dong 2009
                        - - "Selenomastix" Woodcock & Lapage 1913
                          - Mitsuokella Shah & Collins 1983

== See also ==
- List of bacterial orders
- List of bacteria genera
