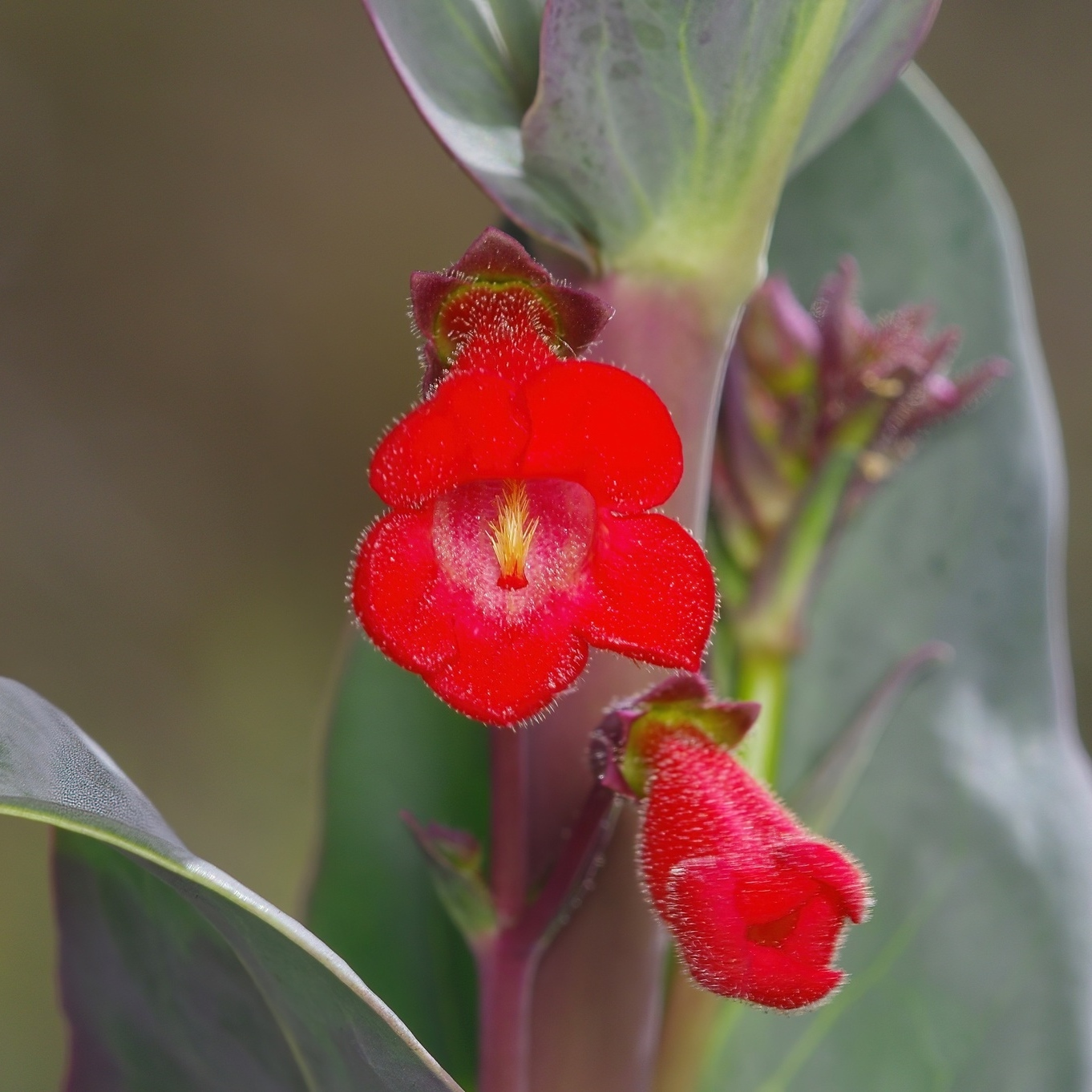
- In the drainage of Limpia Creek, west Texas

Conservation status
- Vulnerable (NatureServe)

Scientific classification
- Kingdom: Plantae
- Clade: Tracheophytes
- Clade: Angiosperms
- Clade: Eudicots
- Clade: Asterids
- Order: Lamiales
- Family: Plantaginaceae
- Genus: Penstemon
- Species: P. wrightii

Binomial name
- Penstemon wrightii Hook.

= Penstemon wrightii =

Plant species in the veronica family

Penstemon wrightii, the Wright penstemon, is a species in the veronica family from the Trans-Pecos in western Texas.

== Description ==
Wright penstemons grow flowering stems that can be 30 to 130 centimeters (1.0–4.3 ft) tall, but are more typically 40–70 cm (16–28 in). The stems are hairless and glaucous growing straight upwards or outwards somewhat and then growing upwards.

The plants have both basal leaves and leaves attached to the stems, like the stems they are smooth and glaucous; they are thick with untoothed edges. The basal leaves and the lowest ones on the stems vary between spatulate, oblanceolate, and elliptic in shape, with a length of 4.5 to 12.5 centimeters (2–5 in) and a width of 1.2–4.5 cm (0.5–2 in). They can have ends that are rounded or have a narrow to blunt point, with a base that is tapered. Each flowering stem has four to six leaf pairs, with the uppermost 3.5 to 10 centimeters (1.5–4 in), though more often 5–7 cm (2–3 in), and a width of 1.5–5 cm.

The flowers are are cerise-red to pink and 1.4–1.9 cm long.

== Taxonomy ==
The botanist William Jackson Hooker scientifically described and named Penstemon wrightii in 1851. Charles Wright sent specimens and seeds to Hooker, and plants were blooming in the Royal Botanic Gardens, Kew before it was described. It is very similar in appearance to Penstemon alamosensis, Penstemon superbus, and Penstemon parryi. Along with the rest of the Penstemon genus it is classified in the Plantaginaceae family. The species has no synonyms or varieties.

=== Names ===
The species name, wrightii, is a Botanical Latin form of the last name of Charles Wright, who was part of the United States and Mexican Boundary Survey. It is similarly known by the common names Wright penstemon, Wright's penstemon, and Wright's beardtongue.

== Range and habitat ==
Wright penstemons are endemic to the Trans-Pecos in the state of Texas, with the species reliably recorded in Brewster, Presidio, Jeff Davis, and Reeves counties, with it noted as being especially common in Jeff Davis County around 1970. It grows on rocky hillsides and in canyons in the mountains at 900 to 1,800 meters (3,000–5,900 ft). There are uncertain reports that it might grow across the border in Mexico.

== See also ==
- List of Penstemon species
