= Desert beardtongue =

Desert beardtongue or desert penstemon is a common name for several plants and may refer to:

- Penstemon parryi, native to the Sonoran desert of Arizona and northern Mexico
- Penstemon pseudospectabilis, native to the southwestern United States
