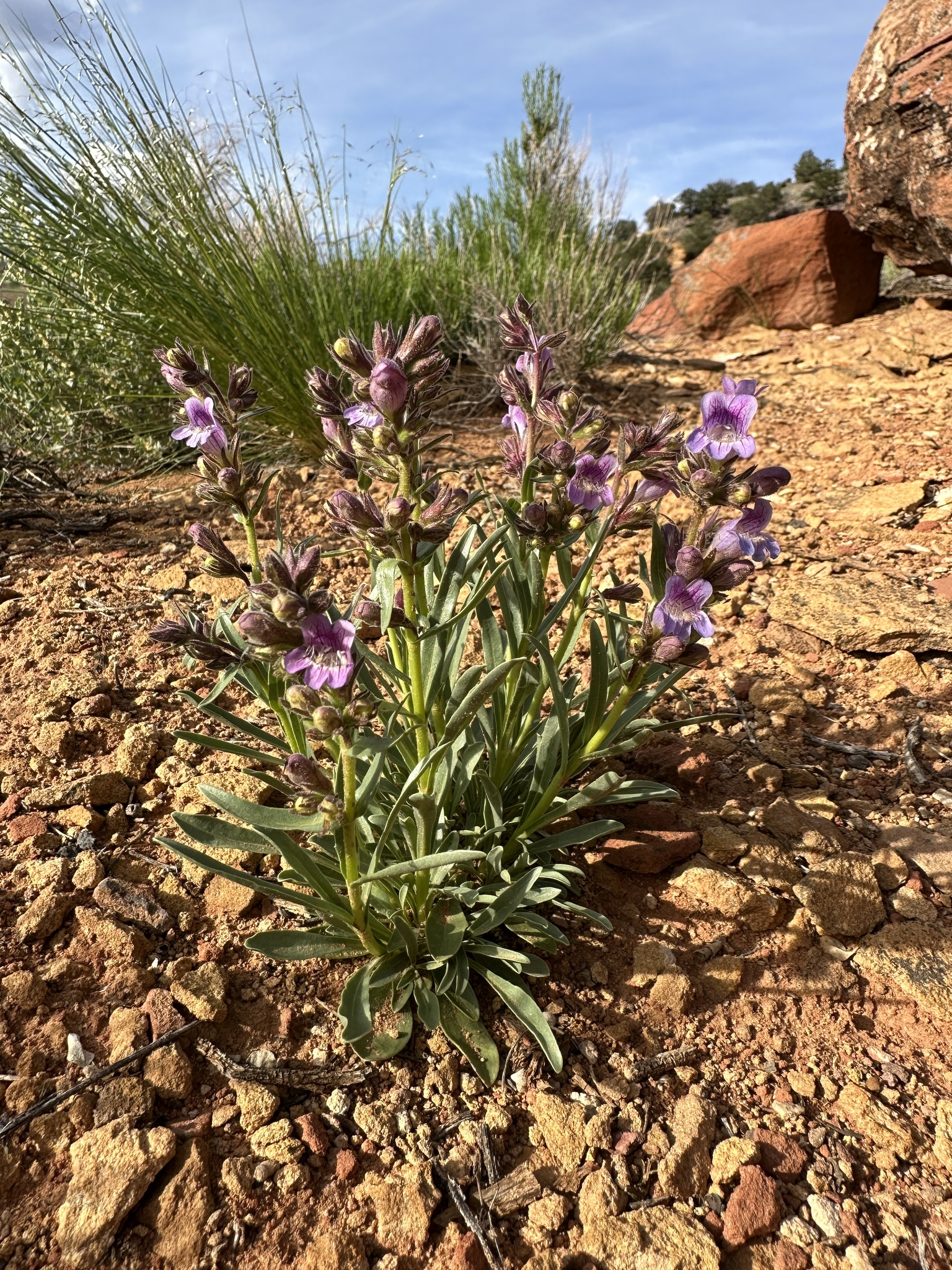
- Flowering in Wayne County, Utah

Conservation status
- Vulnerable (NatureServe)

Scientific classification
- Kingdom: Plantae
- Clade: Tracheophytes
- Clade: Angiosperms
- Clade: Eudicots
- Clade: Asterids
- Order: Lamiales
- Family: Plantaginaceae
- Genus: Penstemon
- Species: P. ophianthus

Binomial name
- Penstemon ophianthus Pennell, 1920

Synonyms
- Penstemon jamesii subsp. ophianthus (Pennell) D.D.Keck (1938); Penstemon pilosigulatus A.Nelson (1926)

= Penstemon ophianthus =

Plant species in the plantain family

Penstemon ophianthus, the coiled anther penstemon, is a species of small perennial plant in the plantain family. It has very noticeable dark violet lines on its flowers over a lighter blue-lavender color. The species grows in the plateaus and canyon lands of western Colorado and New Mexico, northern Arizona, and southern Utah.

== Description ==
Penstemon ophianthus is a small herbaceous plant that may be 10 to 40 centimeters tall, but is usually 13 to 36 cm. It may also have one or more stems that grow straight upwards or curve outwards and then upwards. They have both cauline and basal leaves, leaves on its stems those growing directly from its base. The above ground parts grow from a branched caudex atop a taproot. It is long lived for a penstemon.

The leaves are both cauline and basal, attached to the stems and directly to the base of the plant. The basal leaves and the lowest ones on the stems measure 1.6 to 12 centimeters long and 0.6 to 2.2 cm wide. They are oblanceolate in shape with edges that are smooth or sinuate-dentate, having rounded teeth and deep wavy indentations, and attached to the plant by a petiole. There are two to four pairs of cauline leaves with the upper ones much narrower, somewhat shorter, and directly attached to the stems or with just a short petiole.

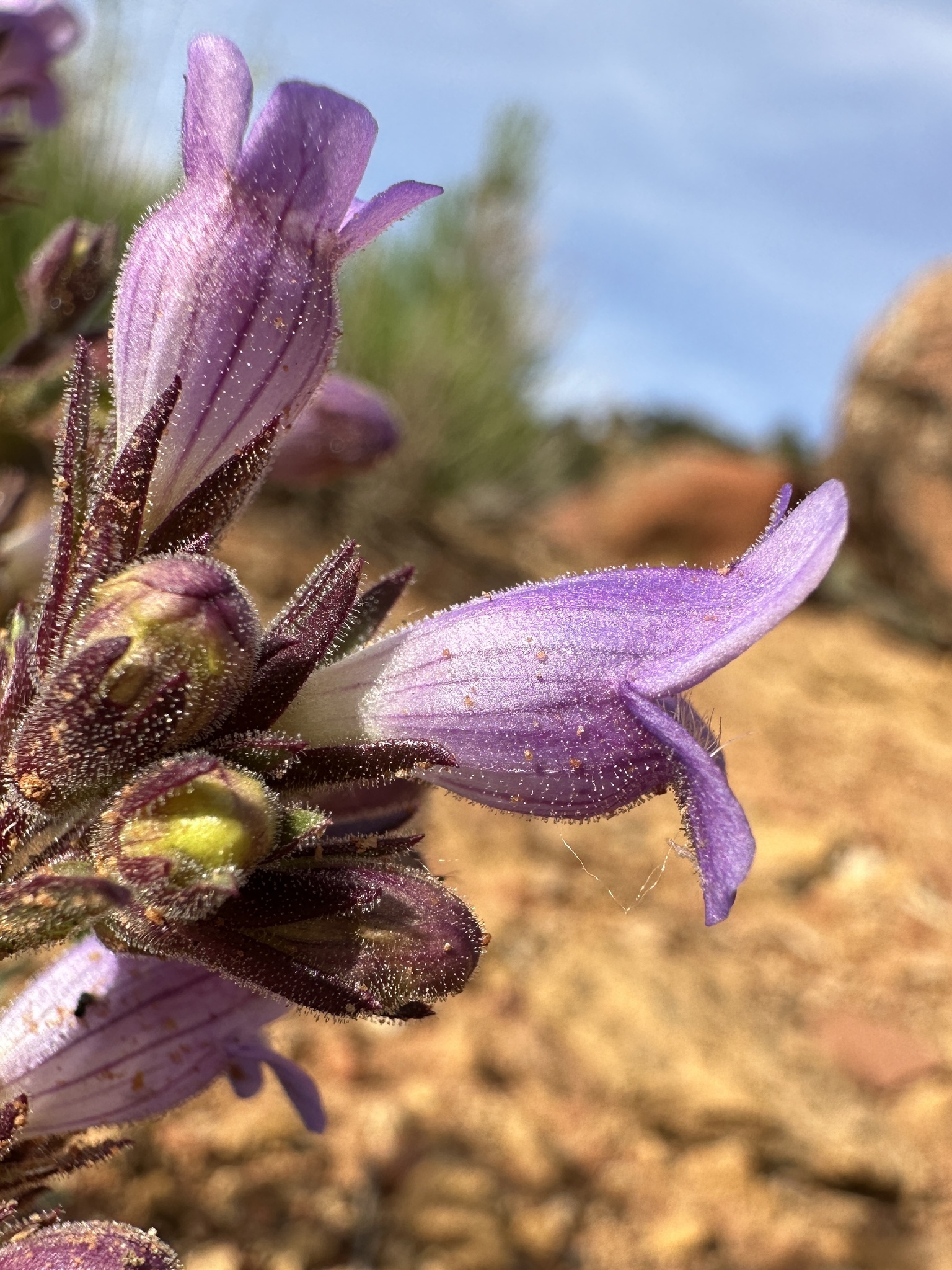
Side view of glandular hairy flower

The inflorescence has the flowers more or less all facing to one side and four to nine groups of flowers with bracts 1.2–7 centimeters long under each. In each group there will be two cymes with between one and seven flowers, though usually at least three. The flowers have a ground color of lavender, violet, or blue-violet with bold deep purple nectar guides on all the flower lobes. Very rarely, they may be white. The flower is 14 to 22 millimeters long with an opening 7–11 mm in diameter that expands abruptly towards the front and is not constricted. The flower's throat is white other than the purple nectar guides and covered in soft, white glandular hairs. The staminode is obviously exserted, extending out of the flower's opening, and thickly covered in long yellow hairs. Blooming may be as early as the end of May or as late as the start of July.

The fruits are dry capsules 6 to 11 millimeters in length and 5 to 6 mm broad. The seeds within are black to brown in color and angled, each about 1.5 to 4.8 mm.

Penstemon jamesii is very similar in appearance, but it grows in eastern New Mexico and southeastern Colorado, rather than in the west of these states, and is also found in Texas. The length of the corolla, the fused petals of the flower, is longer in P. jamesii, 24 mm or greater. On the other hand the corolla of Penstemon breviculus is usually shorter, usually less than 15 mm, though occasionally it will reach 18 mm. It also lacks glandular hairs within the flower's throat.

== Taxonomy ==
Penstemon ophianthus was scientifically described and named by Francis W. Pennell in 1920. The type specimen had been collected in 1894 by Marcus E. Jones near the Utah towns of Bicknell (then Thurber) and Loa. However, it was identified at the time as Penstemon moffatti. This species is closely related to Penstemon jamesii and Penstemon breviculus. The Penstemon expert David D. Keck considered it to be subspecies of P. jamesii, though the ranges do not overlap and the length of fused petals is different. More recently the botanists Ronald Lee Hartman and B.E. Nelson considered P. breviculus and Penstemon parviflorus to be synonyms of P. ophianthus. Though as of 2024 they are not synonyms according to Plants of the World Online.

=== Names ===
The species name, ophianthus, is a compound word from snake and flower. In English it is known by the common name Loa penstemon or coiled anther penstemon.

== Range and habitat ==
The range of coiled anther penstemon is in the Four Corners region. It grows in much of northern Arizona all the way to Mohave County in the west. In Utah this species is from the Colorado Plateau in the southeastern and south central part of the state. Likewise it grows in western Colorado, though only as far north as Montrose County. It also grows in part of the northwest of New Mexico. The elevation range extends down to 1,500 meters (4,900 ft) and as high as 2,300 meters (7,500 ft).

Plants most often grow in dry sandy loam, sandy, or gravelly soils. They also are strongly associated with red or black cinder soils near cinder cones. However, they also grow on clay soils at times. They are associated with sagebrush steppes, pinyon-juniper woodlands, around Gamble oak groves, and ponderosa pine forests.

=== Conservation ===
The conservation organization NatureServe evaluated Penstemon ophianthus in 1993, rating it vulnerable (G3). Their explanation was that it has a limited range and no abundance information. At the state level they also rated it as vulnerable (S3) in both Arizona and Colorado. In Utah they rated it as imperiled (S2).

== Ecology ==
In an experiment in a pinyon-juniper woodland within the Kaibab National Forest Penstemon ophianthus was absent in 2004, but was found at low levels in 2011 after a thinning and prescribed burn treatment.

== See also ==
- List of Penstemon species
