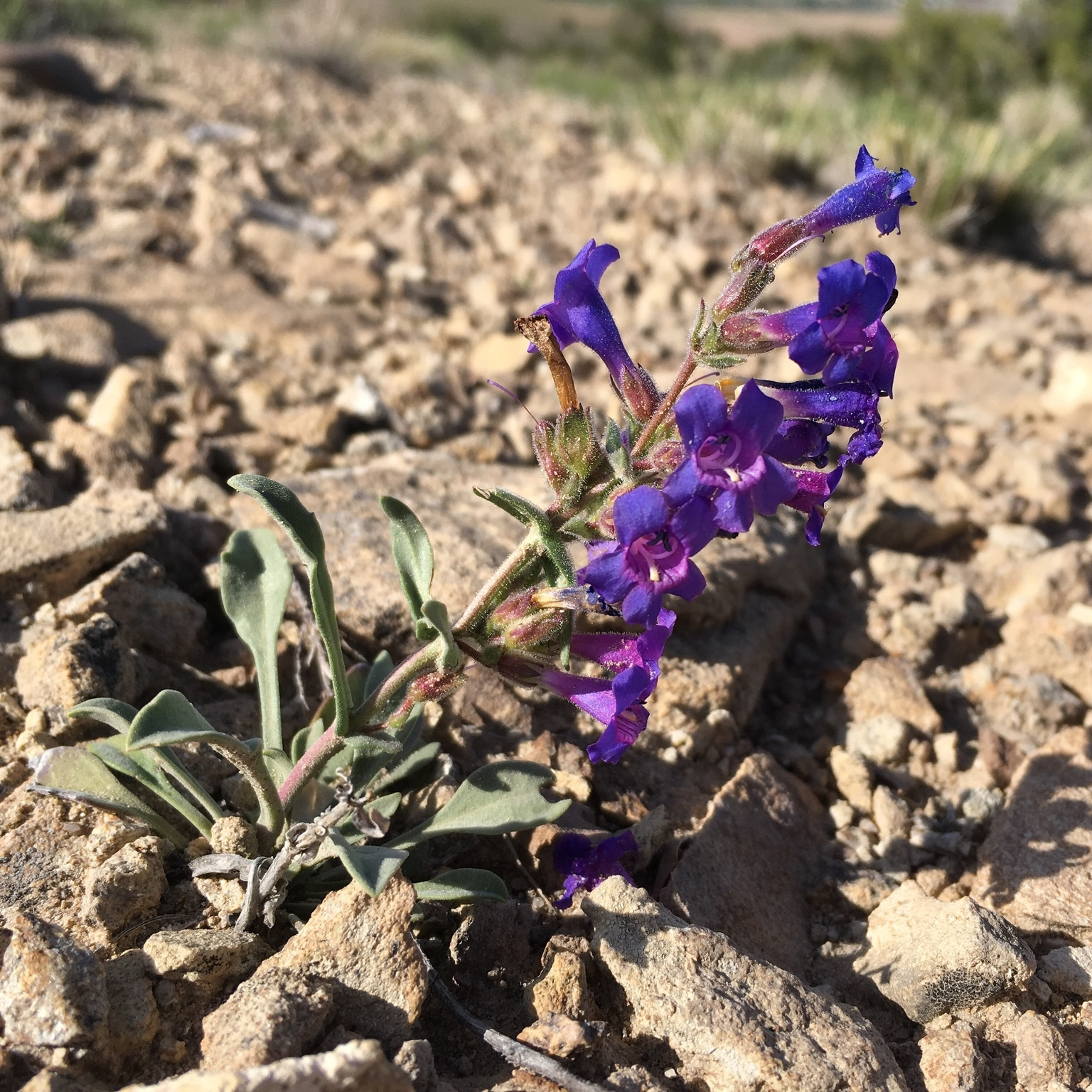
- Flowering in Mesa County, Colorado

Conservation status
- Vulnerable (NatureServe)

Scientific classification
- Kingdom: Plantae
- Clade: Tracheophytes
- Clade: Angiosperms
- Clade: Eudicots
- Clade: Asterids
- Order: Lamiales
- Family: Plantaginaceae
- Genus: Penstemon
- Species: P. moffatii

Binomial name
- Penstemon moffatii Eastw.

Synonyms
- Penstemon moffatii subsp. typicus D.D.Keck; Penstemon moffatii subsp. paysonii (Pennell) D.D.Keck; Penstemon paysonii Pennell

= Penstemon moffatii =

Plant species in the veronica family

Penstemon moffatii, commonly called Moffat penstemon, is a flowering plant from the mesas and canyons of western Colorado and eastern Utah.

== Description ==
Penstemon moffatii is a herbaceous plant with a woody caudex that grows 7 to 30 centimeters (2.8 to 11.8 in) tall, though on rare occasions it may only be 3 cm (1.2 in) tall. The caudex is thick, sometimes branched, and grows atop a thick taproot. The stems are ascending to erect, that is they grow outwards and then curve to upright growth or grow straight upwards, and are covered in rough backwards facing hairs.

Plants have both basal and cauline leaves, those springing directly from the base of the plant and ones attached to the stems. The lower leaves are attached to the plant by a petiole and 1.5 to 6.5 centimeters (0.6 to 2.6 in) long, though usually less than 4.5 cm (1.8 in). Their width most often ranges between 3 and 20 millimeters, occasionally as wide as 25 mm. The basal and lower leaves are spatulate, broadly obovate, to oblanceolate; spoon shaped, more teardrop shaped, to like a reversed spear head. Their edges may be smooth or sinuate-toothed. There may be one to four pairs of leaves attached to the stems with a length of 1.6 to 5.5 cm (0.6 to 2.2 in) and a tapered base or one that clasps the stem.

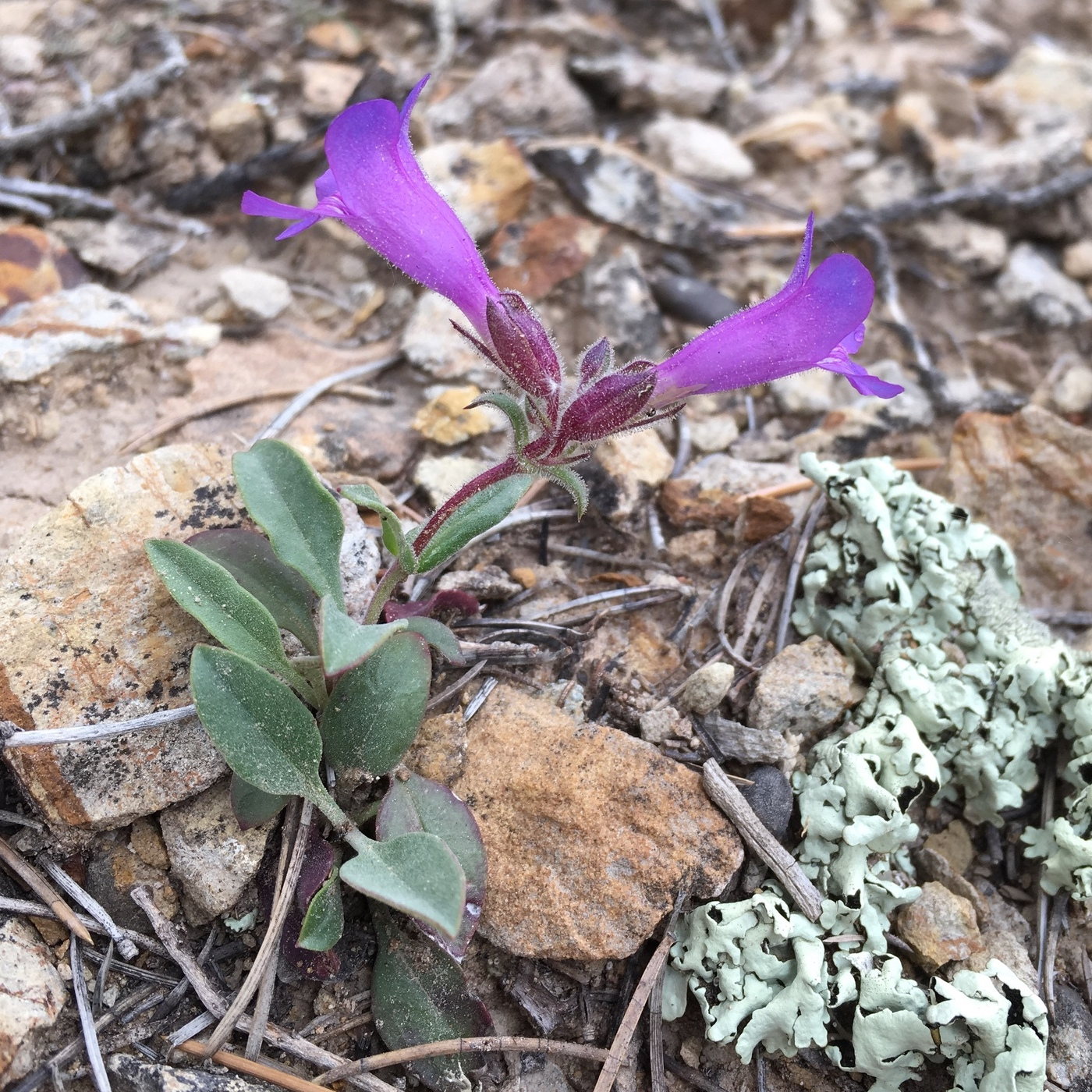
Example of a very small plant

The inflorescence at the top of the stem is highly variable in length from 1 to 12 cm. It may have anywhere from one to seven groups of flowers with a nearby pair of bracts just under where they attach to the stems. The flowers may be 1.5 to 2.2 cm long and are funnel shaped tubes weakly divided into upper and lower lips at the end. They are blue, blue-purple, or less often purple and covered on the outside by glandular hairs.

The fruit is a dry capsule that is broadly ovoid, shaped like a fat egg, 6 to 10 millimeters long. The seeds are about 3 mm long.

== Taxonomy ==
Penstemon moffatii is a member of the Penstemon genus in the Plantaginaceae family. In physical appearance Penstemon moffatii most closely resembles Penstemon breviculus among the penstemons in its range.

The scientific description and name of Penstemon moffatii was published in 1893 by the botanist Alice Eastwood. The specimens she described were collected near Grand Junction, Colorado along the railroad serving the local coal beds. It has three synonyms. In 1920 Francis W. Pennell described and named Penstemon paysonii. However David D. Keck argued for this as a subspecies of P. moffatii in a paper he published in 1938. Though this and the other subspecies name he used are not accepted.

=== Names ===
Eastwood gave this species its name as an honor to the Gilded Age financier David H. Moffat. In English it is known as Moffat penstemon.

== Range and habitat ==
The range of Penstemon moffatii extends across parts of western Colorado and eastern Utah. In Colorado it grows in six counties, from Garfield County in the north through Mesa, Delta, Montrose, and San Miguel to Montezuma County in the southwest corner of the state. It is part of the flora of Colorado National Monument. The USDA records it in seven counties in Utah, from San Juan in the southeast corner north through Garfield, Wayne, Grand, Emery, Duchesne, and Utah counties.

It grows on both mesas and slopes, often on shale or gravel, but also on sandy and clay soils. It is associated with several southwestern plant communities including sagebrush shrublands, pinyon-juniper woodlands, and blackbush scrub.

=== Conservation ===
In the year 2000 NatureServe evaluated Penstemon moffatii and rated it as vulnerable (G3) across its natural range due to a limited distribution with no abundance information available. In Colorado they assigned it the same rating at the state level and in Utah the rated it imperiled (S2).

== Uses ==
Penstemon moffatii is considered a good plant for dry rock gardens by experts in the growing of penstemons, but it is not a commonly cultivated species.

== See also ==
- List of Penstemon species
