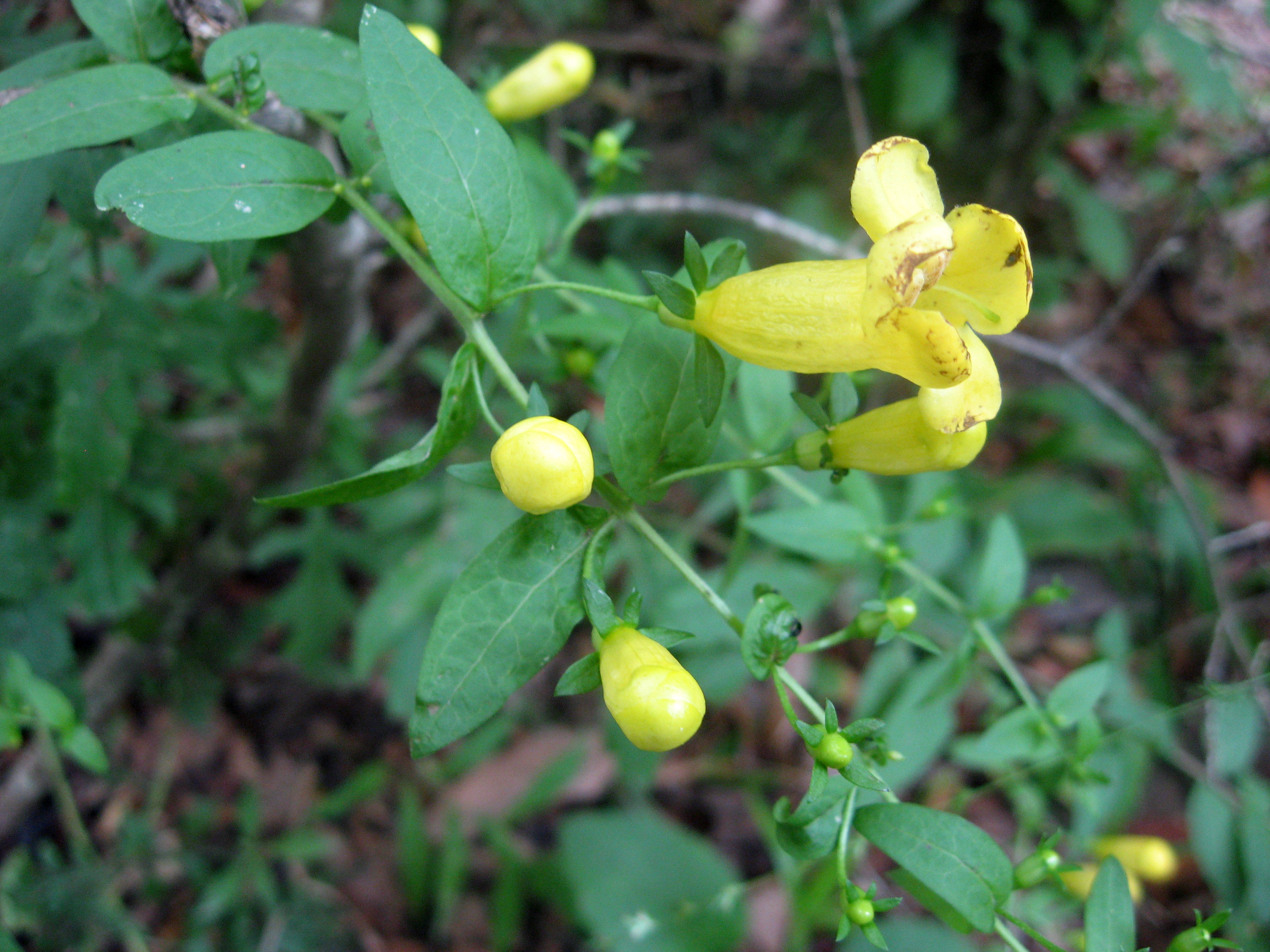

Conservation status
- Vulnerable (NatureServe)

Scientific classification
- Kingdom: Plantae
- Clade: Tracheophytes
- Clade: Angiosperms
- Clade: Eudicots
- Clade: Asterids
- Order: Lamiales
- Family: Orobanchaceae
- Genus: Aureolaria
- Species: A. patula

Binomial name
- Aureolaria patula (Chapm.) Pennell

= Aureolaria patula =

Species of flowering plant

Aureolaria patula, commonly known as spreading yellow false foxglove or Cumberland oak-leach, is a species of plant in the family Orobanchaceae. It is native to the upper Southeastern United States, where it is found in Alabama, Georgia, Kentucky, and Tennessee. Due to its limited geographic range, this species in considered vulnerable, and is listed as rare in every state it is found. It is often found in populations consisting of only a few plants. Its habitat is rich alluvial forests and limestone slopes along major rivers.

Like other members of its genus, Aureolaria patula is hemiparasitic on tree roots. It produces tubular yellow flowers in late summer.
