= Digitalis ambigua =

Digitalis ambigua can refer to:

- Digitalis ambigua Murray, a synonym of Digitalis grandiflora Mill.
- Digitalis ambigua Willd. ex Ledeb., a synonym of Pennellianthus frutescens (Lamb.) Crosswh.
