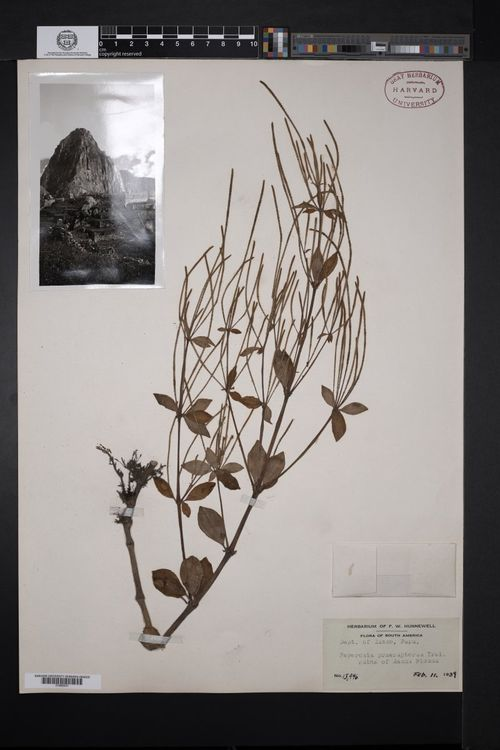

Scientific classification
- Kingdom: Plantae
- Clade: Tracheophytes
- Clade: Angiosperms
- Clade: Magnoliids
- Order: Piperales
- Family: Piperaceae
- Genus: Peperomia
- Species: P. praeruptorum

Binomial name
- Peperomia praeruptorum Trel.

= Peperomia praeruptorum =

Species of plant

Peperomia praeruptorum is a species of terrestrial or epiphytic herb in the genus Peperomia that is native to Peru. It grows on wet tropical biomes. Its conservation status is Threatened.

== Description ==
The type specimen were collected at Río Yanamayo, Peru at an altitude of 2200-2400 meters above sea level.

Peperomia praeruptorum is a rather large, more or less branched, somewhat erect, rock-dwelling herb with a stem 1–3 mm thick, sparsely covered in crisp pilose hairs. The leaves are in whorls of 2–4 at the nodes. They are elliptic, acute at both ends, measuring 2–4 cm long and 1–1.5 cm wide, 5-nerved, paler beneath, and somewhat loosely pubescent along the nerves. The crisp-pubescent petiole is 5–15 mm long. The terminal and axillary spikes are 80–100 mm long and 1 mm thick, with short pseudopedicels, and are borne on a filiform peduncle 1–2 cm long. The berries are rounded-ovoid, pointed, with an apical stigma.

== Taxonomy and naming ==
It was described in 1936 by William Trelease in Publications of the Field Museum of Natural History, Botanical Series 13, from specimens collected by Francis W. Pennell.

The epithet is derived from the Latin praeruptus (steep, precipitous), referring to the species' habitat on steep rock cliffs or bluffs.

== Distribution and habitat ==
It is native to Peru. It grows as a terrestrial or epiphytic herb. It grows on wet tropical biomes.

== Conservation ==
This species is assessed as Threatened, in a preliminary report.
