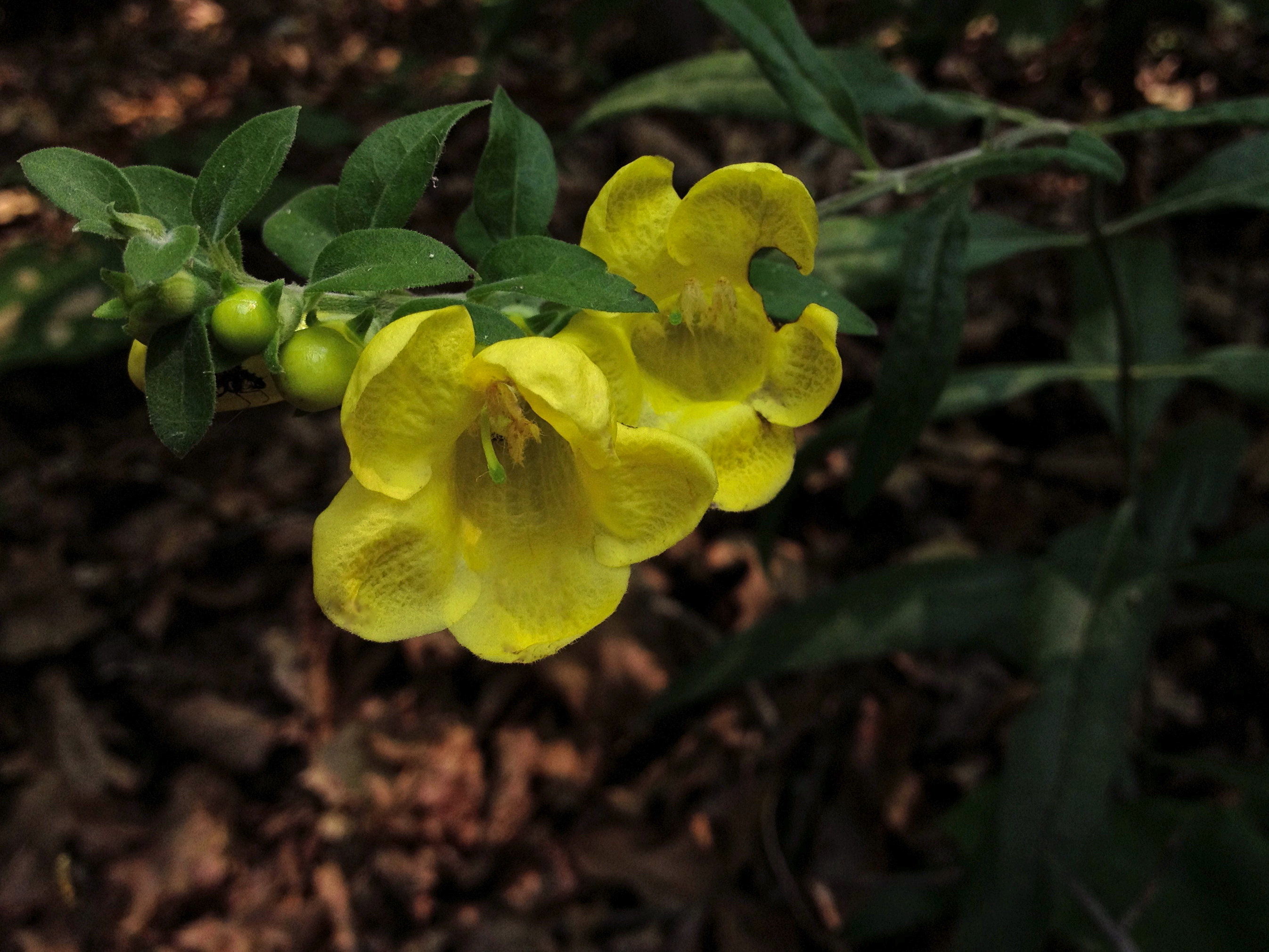

Conservation status
- Secure (NatureServe)

Scientific classification
- Kingdom: Plantae
- Clade: Tracheophytes
- Clade: Angiosperms
- Clade: Eudicots
- Clade: Asterids
- Order: Lamiales
- Family: Orobanchaceae
- Genus: Aureolaria
- Species: A. virginica

Binomial name
- Aureolaria virginica (L.) Pennell

Synonyms
- Agalinis glauca (Eddy) S.F.Blake; Agalinis virginica (L.) S.F.Blake; Aureolaria dispersa (Small) Pennell; Aureolaria glauca Raf. Aureolaria microcarpa Pennell; Dasistoma dispersa Small; Dasistoma quercifolia (Pursh) Benth. Dasistoma virginica Britton; Gerardia dispersa (Small) K. Schum. Gerardia glauca Eddy; Gerardia quercifolia Pursh; Rhinanthus virginicus L. Agalinis flava (L.) B.Boivin; Aureolaria calycosa (Mack. & Bush) Pennell; Aureolaria reticulata Raf. Aureolaria villosa Raf. Dasistoma aurea Raf. Dasistoma calycosa Mack. & Bush; Dasistoma flava (L.) Alph.Wood; Dasistoma pubescens Benth. Gerardia calycosa (Mack. & Bush) Fernald; Gerardia flava L. Gerardia villosa Muhl. ex Raf.

= Aureolaria virginica =

Species of plant

Aureolaria virginica, the downy yellow false foxglove or downy oak leach, is a perennial forb native to the eastern United States and Canada, which produces yellow flowers in summer.

== Description ==
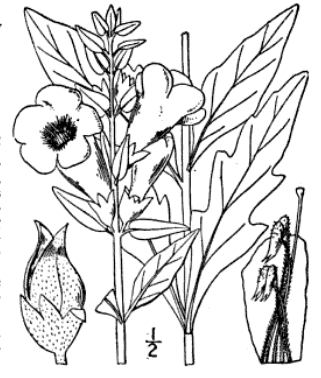
Botanical illustration of Dasystoma flava (1913)

Aureolaria virginica is 50 to 150 centimeters (20 to 59 in) tall and covered in fine downy hairs. The leaves are ovate to lanceolate, 6 to 15 centimeters (2.4 to 5.9 in) long and 1.5 to 4.5 centimeters (0.59 to 1.77 in) wide. The lower leaves sometimes have lobes or teeth. The flowers are borne on 1 to 3 millimeters (0.039 to 0.118 in) long pedicles. The flowers have five 3.5 to 4.5 centimeters (1.4 to 1.8 in) long petals fused into a corolla tube, and are smooth on the outside. The fruit is a 1 to 1.5 centimeters (0.39 to 0.59 in) long dry ovoid capsule that splits open when ripe.

== Distribution and habitat ==
Aureolaria virginica is widely distributed in the eastern United States, although local distribution may be spotty. It has been recorded in Alabama, Connecticut, Washington, D.C., Delaware, Florida, Georgia, Indiana, Kentucky, Louisiana, Massachusetts, Maryland, Michigan, Mississippi, North Carolina, New Hampshire, New Jersey, New York, Ohio, Pennsylvania, Rhode Island, South Carolina, Tennessee, Texas, Virginia, Vermont, and West Virginia. It has also been recorded in the Canadian province of Ontario. Aureolaria virginica is listed as threatened in the state of New Hampshire. In Virginia, it grows in dry oak dominated forests. The presence of this species is dependent on appropriate habitat, and it may be eliminated from an area by development, changes in land use, or competition with invasive species.

== Ecology ==
Like other members of the genus Aureolaria, this species is hemiparasitic on oaks. It may be limited to Quercus alba as a host. It also possesses chlorophyll and performs photosynthesis.

== Taxonomy ==
This species is a member of the genus Aureolaria, which was formerly placed in the family Scrophulariaceae, but has more recently been placed in the family Orobanchaceae, in keeping with the findings of the Angiosperm Phylogeny Group.

The species now known as Aureolaria virginica was first described by Carl Linnaeus in 1753, who named it Rhinanthus virginicus. The same year he was also the first to describe the species now known as Aureolaria flava, which he named Gerardia flava. In the 19th century, botanists renamed both species, which were now understood to belong to the same genus, several times, resulting in numerous synonyms. In the early 20th century Francis W. Pennell discovered that the downy species known at that time as Dasystoma flava actually matched the original description of Linnaeus' Rhinanthus virginicus, and the smooth species known then as Dasystoma virginica actually matched the original description of Linnaeus' Gerardia flava. Pennell realized that an error had been made by 19th century botanists such as Caspar Wistar Eddy and Frederick Traugott Pursh, and so in keeping with botanical naming conventions, he restored the specific epithets of the basionyms to the original species to which they had applied. In 1935, Pennell published "The Scrophulariaceae of Eastern Temperate North America", which uses the current names of these species, Aureolaria virginica, and Aureolaria flava, and explains how confusion arose between the two. News about this correction spread quickly, and there have not been any more recent changes made to the names of these species. Unfortunately, some resources, particularly those functioning as aggregators of large quantities of information, including materials which may be out of date, have perpetuated the confusion, such as a public domain botanical illustration of Dasystoma virginica from 1913 which was mislabeled as Aureolaria virginica on the USDA website, and later uploaded to Wikipedia.
