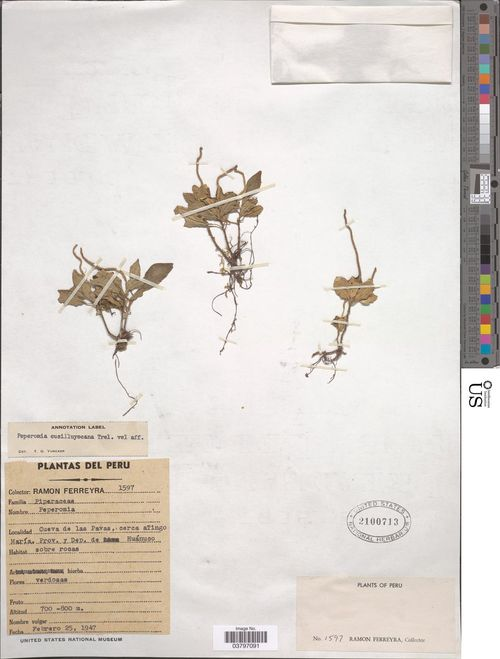

Scientific classification
- Kingdom: Plantae
- Clade: Tracheophytes
- Clade: Angiosperms
- Clade: Magnoliids
- Order: Piperales
- Family: Piperaceae
- Genus: Peperomia
- Species: P. cusilluyocana

Binomial name
- Peperomia cusilluyocana Trel.

= Peperomia cusilluyocana =

Species of flowering plant

Peperomia cusilluyocana is a species of epiphyte in the genus Peperomia that is endemic in Peru. It grows on wet tropical biomes. Its conservation status is Threatened.

== Description ==
The type specimen were collected near Cushi, Peru, at an altitude of 1,500 meters (4,900 ft).

Peperomia cusilluyocana is a stoloniferous, moderately small, more or less branched, glabrous herb with a stem 2–3 mm thick. The alternate leaves are oblanceolate, obtuse or somewhat acuminate, with a cuneate base, measuring about 2.5 cm long and 1.5 cm wide. They have somewhat multiple nerves from the lower half, with 4 branches from the midrib, and are firm and olive-green in color. The clasping petiole is scarcely 5 mm long. The terminal spikes are 30 mm long and 1 mm thick, densely flowered, and borne on a filiform peduncle 10–15 mm long.

== Taxonomy and naming ==
It was described in 1936 by William Trelease in Publications of the Field Museum of Natural History, Botanical Series 13, from specimens collected by Francis Whittier Pennell. It got its epithet from the type locality.

== Distribution and habitat ==
It is endemic in Peru. It grows on a epiphyte environment and is a herb. It grows on wet tropical biomes.

== Conservation ==
This species is assessed as Threatened, in a preliminary report.
