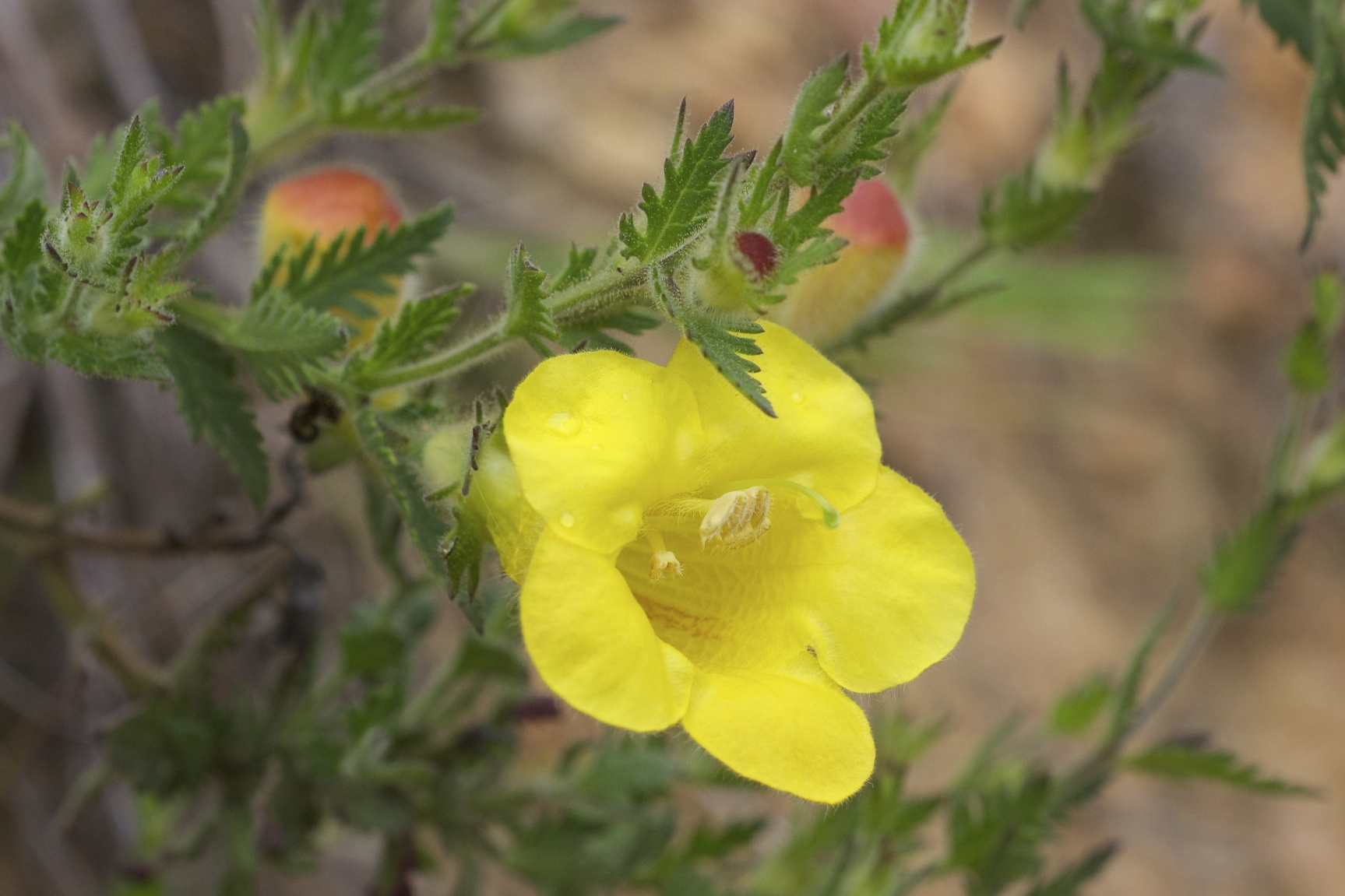

Conservation status
- Secure (NatureServe)

Scientific classification
- Kingdom: Plantae
- Clade: Tracheophytes
- Clade: Angiosperms
- Clade: Eudicots
- Clade: Asterids
- Order: Lamiales
- Family: Orobanchaceae
- Genus: Aureolaria
- Species: A. pectinata

Binomial name
- Aureolaria pectinata (Nutt.) Pennell

= Aureolaria pectinata =

Species of flowering plant

Aureolaria pectinata, commonly called combleaf yellow false foxglove, false foxglove, and comb-leaf oakleach, is a species of plant in the broomrape family that is native to the southeastern United States.

It is an annual plant that produces yellow flowers in the late summer on herbaceous stems. It possesses oppositely arranged, fern-like leaves. It is hemiparasitic, meaning that it gets some of its nutrients from other plants. A. pectinata attaches itself to the roots of oak trees, explaining the common name "oakleach".

== Ecology ==
=== Habitat ===
A. pectinata is often found in communities such as upland hardwood forests, savannas, and pine communities.

=== Phenology ===
The flowers of A. pectinata are bisexual and bloom from May to October.

=== Fire Ecology ===
It has been observed that A. pectinata occurs in sites that have been burned, but not in sites that have not.

=== Pollination, Herbivory, and Toxicology ===
A. pectinata has been observed to be pollinated by both bees and hummingbirds.It serves as the larval host plant for Euphydryas phaeton.
