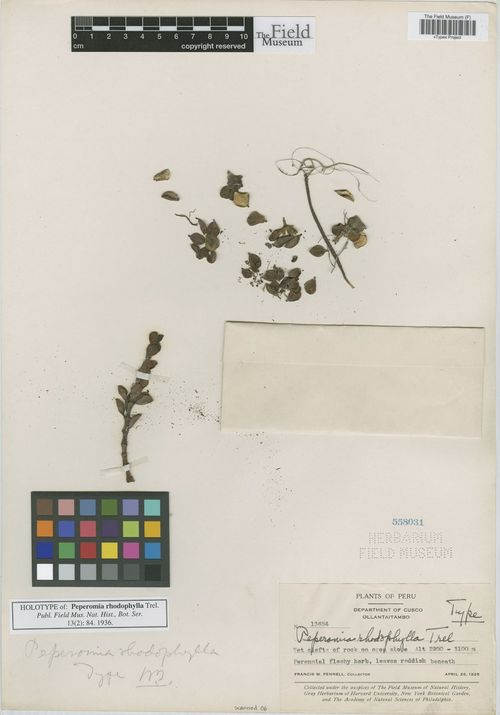

Scientific classification
- Kingdom: Plantae
- Clade: Tracheophytes
- Clade: Angiosperms
- Clade: Magnoliids
- Order: Piperales
- Family: Piperaceae
- Genus: Peperomia
- Species: P. rhodophylla

Binomial name
- Peperomia rhodophylla Trel.

= Peperomia rhodophylla =

Species of epiphyte

Peperomia rhodophylla is a species of epiphyte in the genus Peperomia that is endemic in Peru. It grows on wet tropical biomes. Its conservation status is Not Threatened.

== Description ==
The type specimen were collected near Ollantaitambo, Peru at an altitude of 2900-3100 meters.

Peperomia rhodophylla is a small, very succulent, rock-dwelling herb that is opaque but scarcely more than minutely papillose. The stem is 2–4 mm thick. The leaves are in whorls of about 4 at the nodes. They are somewhat ovate-elliptic, very obtuse, with a somewhat acute base, measuring 16 mm long and 8 mm wide, and are scarcely nerved. The petiole is 2–3 mm long. The terminal spikes, when young, are 10 mm long and 1 mm thick, densely flowered, with a filiform peduncle about the same length.

== Taxonomy and naming ==
It was described in 1936 by William Trelease in Publications of the Field Museum of Natural History, Botanical Series 13, from specimens collected by Francis W. Pennell. The epithet rhodophylla is derived from the Greek rhodon and phyllon, referring to the reddish or rose-colored leaves often found in this species.

== Distribution and habitat ==
It is endemic in Peru. It grows on a epiphyte environment and is a herb. It grows on wet tropical biomes.

== Conservation ==
This species is assessed as Not Threatened, in a preliminary report.
