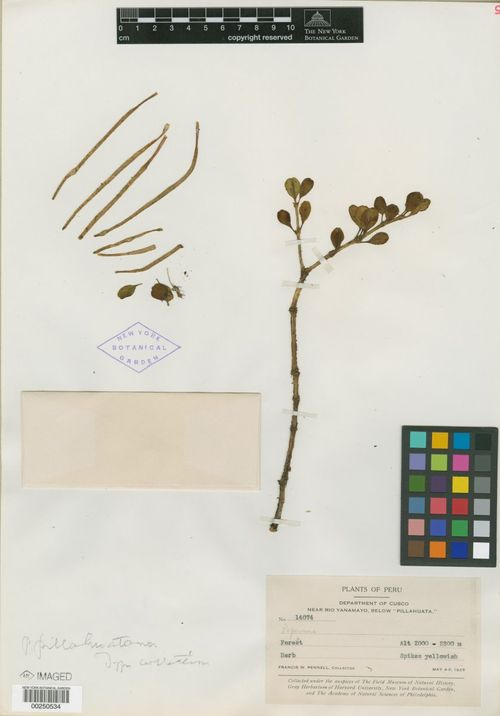

Scientific classification
- Kingdom: Plantae
- Clade: Tracheophytes
- Clade: Angiosperms
- Clade: Magnoliids
- Order: Piperales
- Family: Piperaceae
- Genus: Peperomia
- Species: P. pillahuatana

Binomial name
- Peperomia pillahuatana Trel.

= Peperomia pillahuatana =

Species of plant

Peperomia pillahuatana is a species of terrestrial or epiphytic herb in the genus Peperomia that is native to Peru. It grows on wet tropical biomes. Its conservation status is Threatened.

== Description ==
The type specimen were collected at Pillahuata, Peru at an altitude of 200-2300 meters above sea level.

Peperomia pillahuatana is a medium-sized, ascending, erect, glabrous herb with a stem 4–5 mm thick that is repeatedly forked and exfoliates in a furfuraceous manner. The leaves are opposite or in whorls of 3–4 on the upper nodes. They are obovate, slightly emarginate, with a cuneate base, measuring 8–20 mm long and 8–14 mm wide, and are opaque and leathery with a granular underside. The petiole is 3–10 mm long. The terminal spikes are 80 mm long and 2–3 mm thick, with a peduncle 10–15 mm long. The ovaries are inserted in small pits.

== Taxonomy and naming ==
It was described in 1936 by William Trelease in Publications of the Field Museum of Natural History, Botanical Series 13, from specimens collected by Francis W. Pennell.

The epithet pillahuatana is derived from the type locality.

== Distribution and habitat ==
It is native to Peru. It grows as a terrestrial or epiphytic herb. It grows on wet tropical biomes.

== Conservation ==
This species is assessed as Threatened, in a preliminary report.
