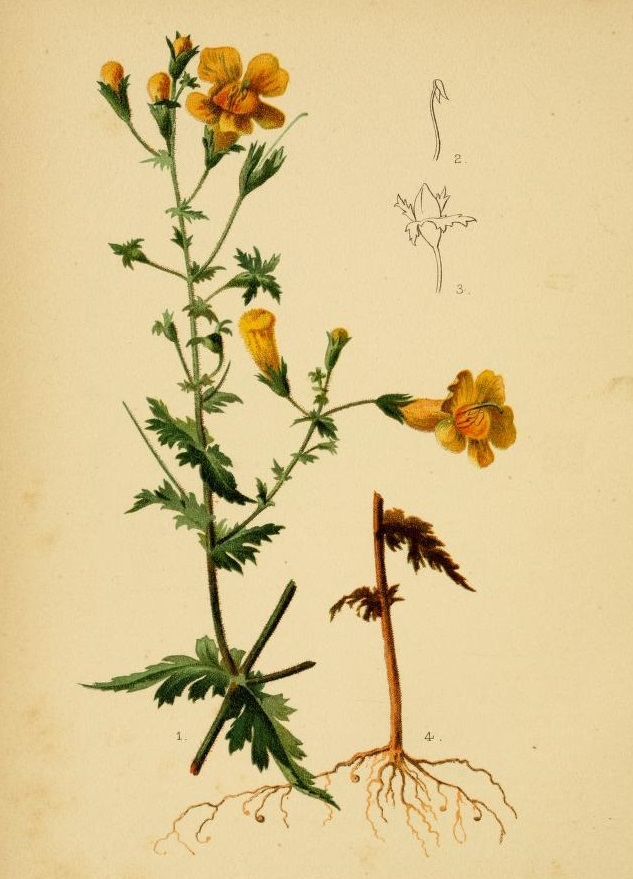
- An 1878 illustration of Aureolaria pedicularia in bloom

Scientific classification
- Kingdom: Plantae
- Clade: Tracheophytes
- Clade: Angiosperms
- Clade: Eudicots
- Clade: Asterids
- Order: Lamiales
- Family: Orobanchaceae
- Genus: Aureolaria
- Species: A. pedicularia

Binomial name
- Aureolaria pedicularia (L.) Raf. ex Pennell

Synonyms
- Gerardia pedicularia L. Panctenis pedicularia (L.) Raf.

= Aureolaria pedicularia =

Species of flowering plant

Aureolaria pedicularia, the fernleaf yellow false foxglove, fern-leaved false foxglove, or fernleaf false foxglove, is a hemiparasitic plant of the family Orobanchaceae. Aureolaria pedicularia is native to parts of the eastern US, the Midwest, and adjacent Canada. This plant is known for its distinct leaf shape and overall plant size. The common names for Aureolaria pedicularia come from its fern-like leaves.

== Introduction ==
Aureolaria pedicularia is a member of the family Orobanchaceae. Some common names for this plant include: fern-leaved false foxglove and fernleaf false foxglove. Aureolaria pedicularia is a hemiparasitic plant that gets some of its nutrients from a plant host. These hosts are perennial trees of the genus Quercus (oaks). Aureolaria pedicularia is recognized by its yellow petals and distinctive fern-like leaves.

== Description ==
Aureolaria pedicularia is a member of the genus Aureolaria. This plant has an average height of 1 foot to 4 feet, depending on the season. Aureolaria pedicularia is a root hemiparasite, meaning it attaches to the roots of its hosts. Aureolaria pedicularia selectively parasitizes oaks (Quercus). Aureolaria pedicularia gets its nutrients from oak (Fagaceae). The part of the roots from the parasite (Aureolaria pedicularia) that take the nutrients from the oak selectively parasitize the favored hosts (oak).

=== Morphology ===
Aureolaria pedicularia has flowers with yellow petals. The leaves are simple, meaning they do not separate into leaflets. The leaf arrangement is opposite. There are two leaves at each attachment of a leaf on the stem or branch of the flower. The edges of the leaf blades have lobes. The flowers of Aureolaria pedicularia are bilateral. Each flower has five fused petals that form a tube. Aureolaria pedicularia also has four stamens. The fruit type for this flower is dry and splits open when it is ripe. The fruit type is a capsule. The fruit size is about 10–13 mm in length.

== Taxonomy ==
Aureolaria pedicularia is in the family Orobanchaceae. This family is made up of 190 genera and 4,000 temperate species. Most species in the family Orobanchaceae, including Aureolaria pedicularia, are partial root parasites. Partial root parasites get their nutrients from another living plant. Species in the genus Aureolaria are also known as the false foxglove. Species in this genus are widespread over much of eastern North America. All members of this genus are root parasites. Observation was first presented by the noted American botanist Asa Gray.

There are about 21 synonyms for Aureolaria pedicularia. The subspecies are Aureolaria pedicularia var. carolinensis Pennell and Aureolaria pedicularia var. ambigens Fernald. These subspecies are distinguished by physical characteristics such as glandular hairs on the leaves and other traits such as size. The distribution and nativism of the various Aureolaria pedicularia varieties need additional study.

Two of the most common varieties of Aureolaria pedicularia are A. pedicularia var. intercedens Pennell and A. pedicularia var. pedicularia. In North America, A. pedicularia var. intercedens is known from Massachusetts and New Hampshire. Also in North America, A. pedicularia var. pedicularia is known from Connecticut, Maine, Massachusetts, New Hampshire, Rhode Island, and Vermont.

=== Taxonomic history ===
Rafinesque published Pantenis pedicularis (or Aureolaria) and based it on Gerardia pedicularia L. (1753). Rafinesque did not officially establish the binomial name Aureolaria pedicularia, but he did use it as an alternative for the taxon Pantenis pedicularis.

== Distribution and habitat ==
Habitats for Aureolaria pedicularia include terrestrial locations such as cliffs, balds, ledges, forests, grasslands, ridges, rocky slopes, and woodlands. This plant lives in partly shady areas to sunny areas. The typical soil for this plant is dry and sandy. Aureolaria pedicularia is most commonly found in open oak woods and savannas. The bloom season is from May to October.

The overall US distribution for Aureolaria pedicularia is throughout most of eastern North America, the Great Lakes states and parts of the Midwest

== Uses ==
Aureolaria pedicularia was used by the Cherokee as a drug for antidiarrheal purposes. Aureolaria pedicularia is also commonly used by deer as a food plant.

== Conservation ==
In the state of Maine, the presence of the plant Aureolaria pedicularia is considered uncommon. In the state of Vermont, it is extremely rare. In the state of Minnesota, this plant is considered threatened. One factor contributing to the endangerment of Aureolaria pedicularia is the young larvae or deer's consumption of this plant. Overgrazing by deer of Aureolaria pedicularia may be a threat. Forest fires are also a threat to this species. Another factor that affects the population of Aureolaria pedicularia is the availability of its favored host, since it is a root parasite. This parasite plant uses the roots of oaks (Quercus) as a site for attachment. Without its host, Aureolaria pedicularia cannot survive naturally because it depends on its hosts for its nutrients, including sugars and proteins.
