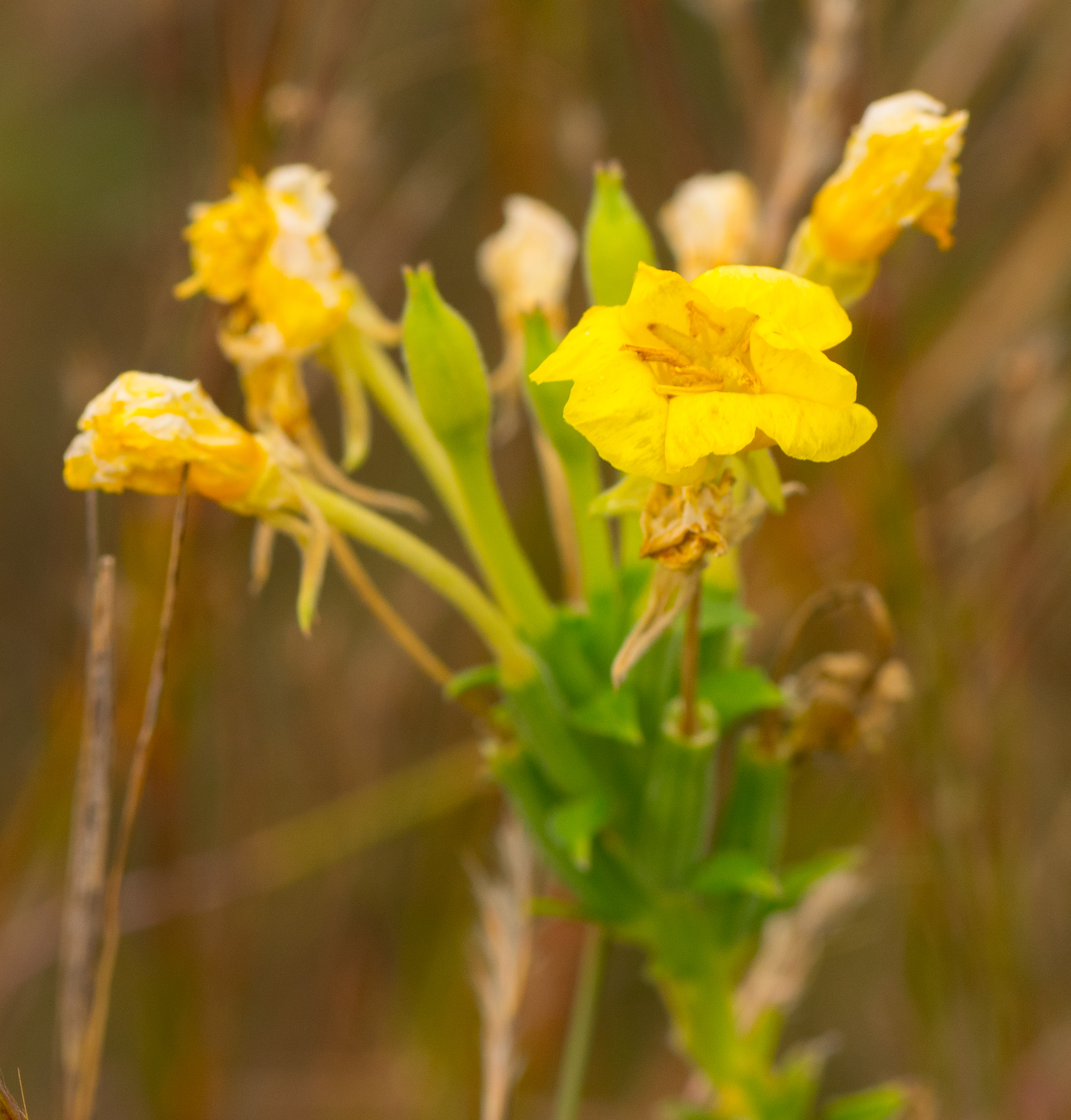
- Close-up of flowers

Scientific classification
- Kingdom: Plantae
- Clade: Tracheophytes
- Clade: Angiosperms
- Clade: Eudicots
- Clade: Asterids
- Order: Lamiales
- Family: Orobanchaceae
- Genus: Aureolaria
- Species: A. grandiflora

Binomial name
- Aureolaria grandiflora (Benth.) Pennell

Synonyms
- List: Agalinis grandiflora (Benth.) S.F.Blake; Agalinis grandiflora var. serrata S.F.Blake; Aureolaria grandiflora var. cinerea Pennell; Aureolaria grandiflora subsp. cinerea (Pennell) Pennell; Aureolaria grandiflora var. pulchra Pennell; Aureolaria grandiflora subsp. pulchra (Pennell) Pennell; Aureolaria grandiflora var. serrata (Torr. ex Benth.) Pennell; Aureolaria grandiflora subsp. serrata (Torr. ex Benth.) Pennell; Aureolaria grandiflora subsp. typica Pennell; Aureolaria serrata (Torr. ex Benth.) Rydb.; Dasistoma drummondii Benth.; Dasistoma drummondii var. serrata (Torr. ex Benth.) Benth.; Dasistoma grandiflora (Benth.) Alph.Wood; Dasistoma serrata (Torr. ex Benth.) Small; Gerardia grandiflora Benth.; Gerardia grandiflora var. cinerea (Pennell) Cory; Gerardia grandiflora var. integriuscula A.Gray; Gerardia grandiflora var. pulchra (Pennell) Fernald; Gerardia grandiflora var. serrata (Torr. ex Benth.) B.L.Rob.; Gerardia serrata Torr. ex Benth.

= Aureolaria grandiflora =

Species of flowering plant

Aureolaria grandiflora, the large-flowered false foxglove, is a species of flowering plant in the family Orobanchaceae. It is native to Ontario, Canada, and the central to east-central United States. It is a hemiparasite on oaks in wet areas.
