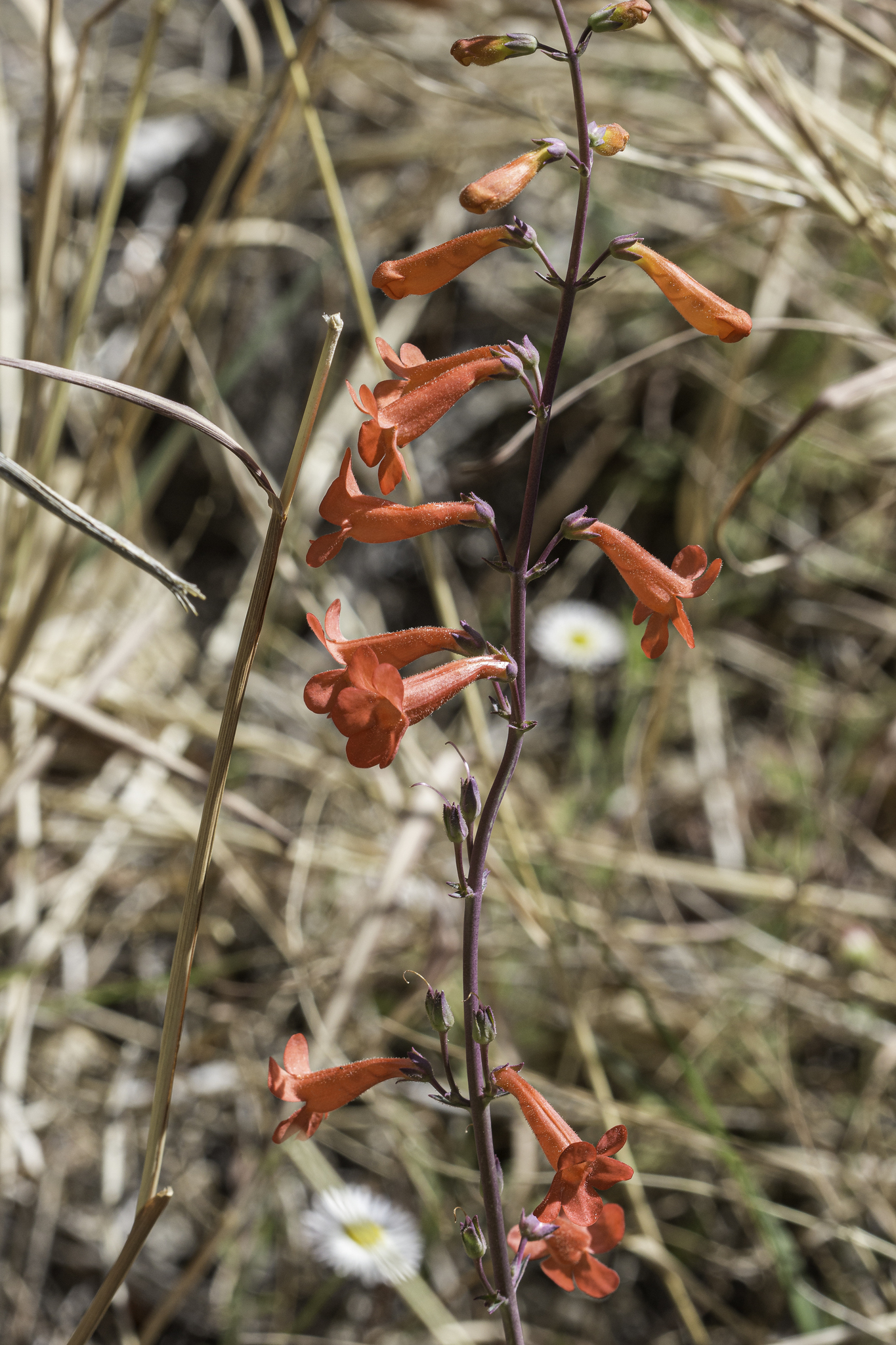
- Lincoln National Forest, New Mexico

Conservation status
- Vulnerable (NatureServe)

Scientific classification
- Kingdom: Plantae
- Clade: Embryophytes
- Clade: Tracheophytes
- Clade: Spermatophytes
- Clade: Angiosperms
- Clade: Eudicots
- Clade: Asterids
- Order: Lamiales
- Family: Plantaginaceae
- Genus: Penstemon
- Species: P. alamosensis

Binomial name
- Penstemon alamosensis Pennell & G.T.Nisbet

= Penstemon alamosensis =

Plant species in the veronica family

Penstemon alamosensis, commonly known as Alamo penstemon, is a rare species of penstemon from New Mexico and Texas. It is known for its tall flowering stems with coral-red flowers.

== Description ==
Alamo penstemon is a variable species which can have flowering stems as short as 14 centimeters (5.5 in) or as tall as 1.2 meters (3.9 ft). Plants can have one or a few stems; the stems are slender, green or slightly gray-green, and hairless.

Like the stems, the leaves are sometimes glaucous, always hairless, and are also not leathery. Plants have both basal leaves and two to six pairs of leaves attached to the flowering stems. The basal leaves have a petiole, a leaf stem, that is about as long as the leaf blade. The basal leaves and the lowest ones on the stems are elliptic to obovate or lanceolate and measure 2.5–14 cm long while 0.9–4.5 cm wide. Leaves on the flowering stems lack leaf stems, instead the base of the leaf attaches directly to the main stem. The upper leaves are reduced in size measuring 1–13.5 cm long and 0.3–3 cm wide, with a usual proportion being about four times long as they are wide.

Flowering occurs in its native habitat in April, May, or June. The flowers are a bright coral-red trumpet opening to a nearly symmetrical face. The mouth of the flower has five lobes, three downwards and two towards the top with rounded ends. The flower measures 1.9–2.5 cm long and is covered with glandular hairs on the outside. The staminode is hairless and 7–9 millimeters long and the stamens do not extend out of the flower.

The flowers are in 5 to 30 groups, though usually not more than 15, with the blooms pointing in all directions or sometimes more or less all in one direction away from the 12–90 cm long inflorescence. Each attachment point usually produces two flowers, but might have just one or as many as four. The fruits are capsules measuring 1.1–1.6 cm long and 0.5–0.8 cm wide.

== Taxonomy ==
Penstemon alamosensis was scientifically described and named by Francis Whittier Pennell and Gladys T. Nisbet with priority dated to 1960. It is classified together with the genus Penstemon in the Plantaginaceae family. It has no subspecies or synonyms. The type specimen was collected by Nisbet together with C. Mankin southeast of Alamogordo in Alamo Canyon.

=== Names ===
The species name, alamosensis, is a Latinization of the location of Alamo Canyon, where the type specimen was collected. Penstemon alamosensis is known by the common name Alamo penstemon. It is also known as the Alamo beardtongue.

== Range and habitat ==
The species is native to just two US states, New Mexico and Texas. The majority of its range is in New Mexico where it grows in the Sacramento Mountains in Otero and Lincoln counties and in the San Andres Mountains in Doña Ana County. In Texas it is found in the Hueco Mountains in El Paso County, the state's westernmost county. The elevation range for Alamo penstemon is 1,300–1,600 meters (4,300–5,200 ft).

In Texas plants are often found in north facing locations and somewhat moist canyon bottoms. Less often they grow from rock crevices or amid bushes that shelter them from grazing.

=== Conservation ===
When it was evaluated in 1997 NatureServe evaluated Alamo penstemon as vulnerable at the global level (G3) and at the state level in New Mexico (S3). In Texas they rated it critically imperiled (S1). Most of the locations where it grows are inaccessible and safe from current land uses, but due to the attractiveness of its flowers, plants in frequently visited places are vulnerable to collecting. A 1995 inventory of the species estimated there to be 5000 mature plants spread across 25 locations in New Mexico.

== Cultivation ==
Alamo penstemons are somewhat rare in cultivation, but the seeds are occasionally available, especially from dealers in the southwestern United States. Its seeds require one to three months of cold-moist stratification to stimulate large percentages to sprout. Gardeners plant it in low-water or rock gardens as a plant to attract hummingbirds and for the beauty of its coral-red blooms.
