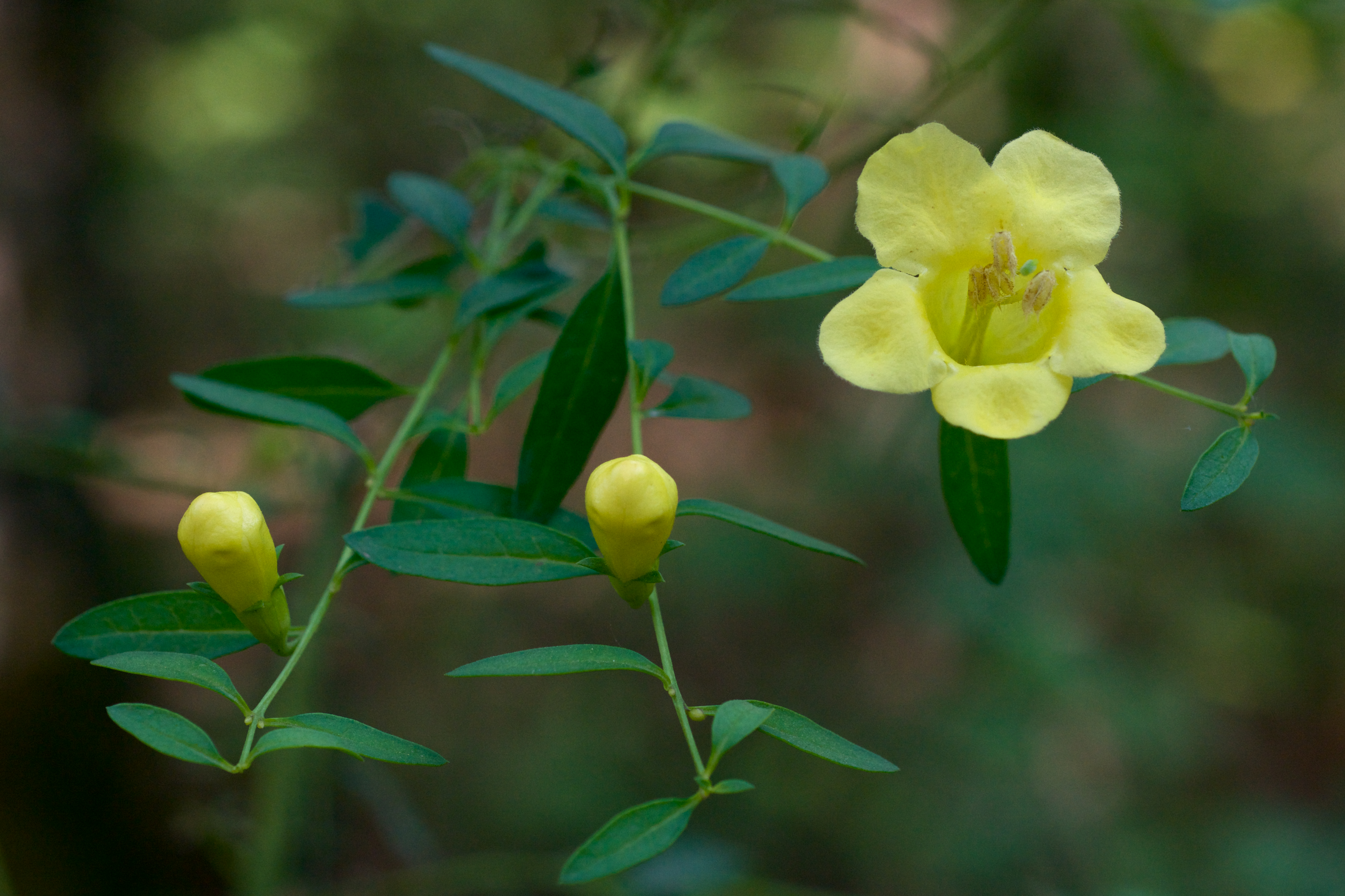

Scientific classification
- Kingdom: Plantae
- Clade: Embryophytes
- Clade: Tracheophytes
- Clade: Angiosperms
- Clade: Eudicots
- Clade: Asterids
- Order: Lamiales
- Family: Orobanchaceae
- Genus: Aureolaria
- Species: A. flava

Binomial name
- Aureolaria flava (L.) Farw.

= Aureolaria flava =

Species of flowering plant

Aureolaria flava, commonly called smooth yellow false foxglove or Gérardie jaune, is a species of plant in the broomrape family that is native to the eastern United States and some parts of southern Canada. Aureolaria flava is a species of flowering plants found within the genus Aureolaria. Aureolaria plants are hemiparasitic, which is a character that in part describes its residing family Orobanchaceae.

It is a perennial that produces yellow flowers in the late summer on herbaceous stems.

== Description ==
Aureolaria flava is described as arching, ascending or erect. Often growing up to 50–250 cm long, the stem and leaves of this plant are characteristically mostly glabrous. The stems are often described as purplish tinged or somewhat glaucous and consistently fistulose. Aureolaria flava are perennial and bisexual with a superior ovary.

Aureolaria flava has distinctly pinnatifid leaves. Commonly 6–15 cm long, leaf apex acute, opposite or decussate, and margins entire. Leaf adaxial deep green with light amounts of nonglandular puberulous hairs. The abaxial side of the leaf is lighter green and glabrous.

Aureolaria flava has bright yellow flowers June to September. Bell shaped calyces between 9–16 mm long, 5 lobed, glabrous, linear, with entire margins. Bell shaped corollas 35–60 mm long, glabrous externally, pubescent at the internal base and lobe margins. 4 stamens fused to the base of the corolla tube. Anthers up to 7mm long spurred at the base surround with dark green nectary ring.

Aureolaria flava has small fruit capsules 12–20 mm long which are often glabrous and ovoid. Seeds are 1.7-2.7 mm long, with coarse winglike ridges.

Aureolaria flava is often mistaken for other members of its genus however the glabrous stem is very distinct to providing easy differentiation.

== Habitat and host species ==
Aureolaria flava is hemiparasitic, establishing connection between its roots and those of its host plant via a haustoria, a specialized type of root. Aureolaria flava is only partially parasitic as it photosynthesizes and contains green tissue, the host plant provides water, additional sugars, and proteins to supplement the needs of the plant. Aureolaria flava grows commonly within hardwood forests preferring oaks specifically white oaks. Subsequently there is a preference for well drained soils, although A. flava can still be found within diverse habitats. It is suggested that as a weak parasite Aureolaria flava does little to no damage large host trees and may even help absorb some mineral nutrients for the trees.

== Range and conservation status ==
Aureolaria flava has a broad distribution in the eastern United States and Canada. The plant is listed as critically imperiled within the state of Delaware. Aureolaria flava is considered imperiled in Pennsylvania, Vermont and Ontario. This concerning status of Aureolaria flava within several states is due to a reliance on semi-open oak ecosytems. Oak ecosystems are under threat for a variety of reasons within eastern North America which directly puts Aureolaria flava at risk. Odocoileus virginianus, white tailed deer, also present a significant threat to A. flava with continually growing deer populations leading to increased predation of many plant species.

== Synonyms ==
Aureolaria flava has many synonyms due in part due to its reclassification from the Scrophulariaceae to the Orobanchaceae and generic reclassification. Listed below many of the commonly accepted synonyms of Aureolaria flava.

Agalinis flava (L.) B.Boivin

Aureolaria calycosa (Mack. & Bush)

Aureolaria flava var. integrifolia Farw.

Aureolaria flava var. reticulata (Raf.) Pennell

Aureolaria flava subsp. reticulata (Raf.) Pennell

Aureolaria reticulata Raf.

Aureolaria villosa Raf.

Dasistoma aurea Raf.

Dasistoma calycosa Mack. & Bush

Dasistoma flava (L.) Alph.Wood

Dasistoma pubescens Benth.

Dasystoma flava (L.) Alph. Wood

Gerardia calycosa (Mack. & Bush) Fernald

Gerardia flava L.

Gerardia flava var. calycosa (Mack. & Bush) Steyerm.

Gerardia flava var. macrantha (Pennell) Fernald

Gerardia flava var. reticulata (Raf.) Cory

Gerardia villosa Muhl. ex Raf.

== Ecosystem interactions ==
Aureolaria flava are pollinated by and provide nectar to bumble bees and hummingbirds among other common pollinators. This species also plays a crucial role as a larval host plant for Euphydryas phaeton.

== Additional info ==
Aureolaria flava has been suggested to have been used as a antidiarrheal drug within indigenous tribes in North America.

== Ecology ==
Aureolaria flava is insect pollinated and is recorded to have been visited in northern Florida by the bee species Lasioglossum reticulatum.
