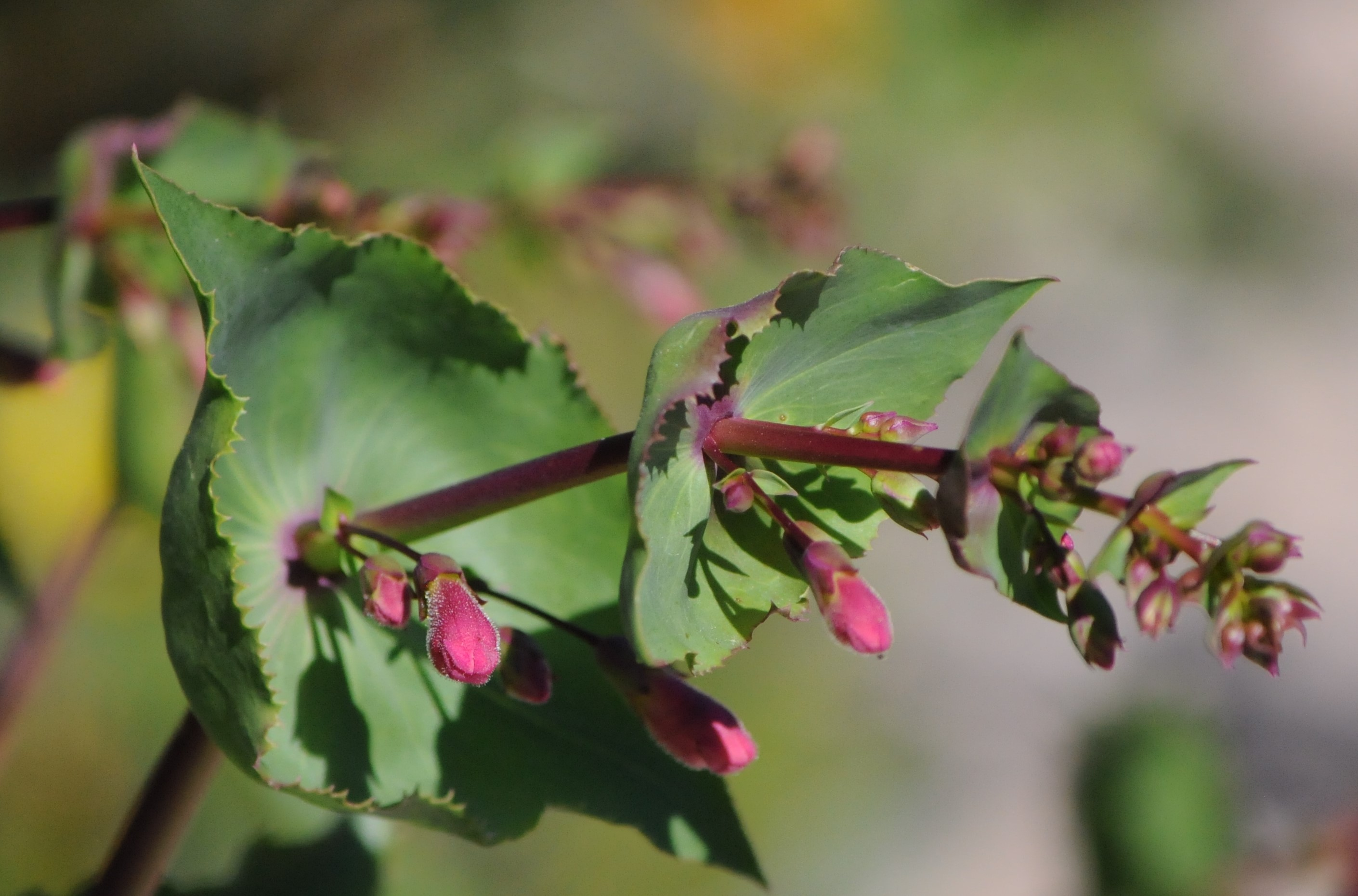

Conservation status
- Apparently Secure (NatureServe)

Scientific classification
- Kingdom: Plantae
- Clade: Tracheophytes
- Clade: Angiosperms
- Clade: Eudicots
- Clade: Asterids
- Order: Lamiales
- Family: Plantaginaceae
- Genus: Penstemon
- Species: P. pseudospectabilis

Binomial name
- Penstemon pseudospectabilis M.E.Jones

Varieties
- P. p. var. connatifolius; P. p. var. pseudospectabilis

Synonyms
- Penstemon connatifolius

= Penstemon pseudospectabilis =

Plant species in the veronica family

Penstemon pseudospectabilis (desert beardtongue, or desert penstemon) a species of penstemon. It's native to the southwestern United States, where it grows in desert and plateau habitat types, such as sandy washes, scrub, and woodland. The plant is generally a shrub growing to one meter, with many erect stems. The thin leaves are oval with wide, pointed tips and serrated edges. They are arranged oppositely in pairs, many are completely fused at the bases about the stem, forming a disc. The inflorescence bears tubular flowers with expanded, lobed mouths and glandular hairs on most surfaces, except the hairless staminode. The flower grows to 2.5 centimeters and is reddish pink.

== Taxonomy ==
Penstemon pseudospectabilis was scientifically described and named in 1908 by the self-taught botanist Marcus E. Jones. It is classified as part of the genus Penstemon within the Plantaginaceae family and has two accepted varieties.

- Penstemon pseudospectabilis var. connatifolius – Native to New Mexico and Arizona
- Penstemon pseudospectabilis var. connatifolius – Native to Utah, Arizona, California, and the Mexican state of Sonora

It has three homotypic synonyms, one of the species itself and two of variety connatifolius.

Table of Synonyms
Name	Year	Rank	Synonym of:	Notes
Penstemon connatifolius A.Nelson	1931	species	var. connatifolius	
Penstemon pseudospectabilis subsp. connatifolius (A.Nelson) D.D.Keck	1937	subspecies	var. connatifolius	
Penstemon pseudospectabilis subsp. typicus D.D.Keck	1937	subspecies	P. pseudospectabilis	not validly publ.

=== Names ===
They are frequently known as desert penstemon, the name also used for the species by the Natural Resources Conservation Service, however other species including Penstemon parryi are sometimes known as this. It is known by the common names high-desert penstemon, perfoliate penstemon, Mojave beardtongue, and Nevada penstemon.
