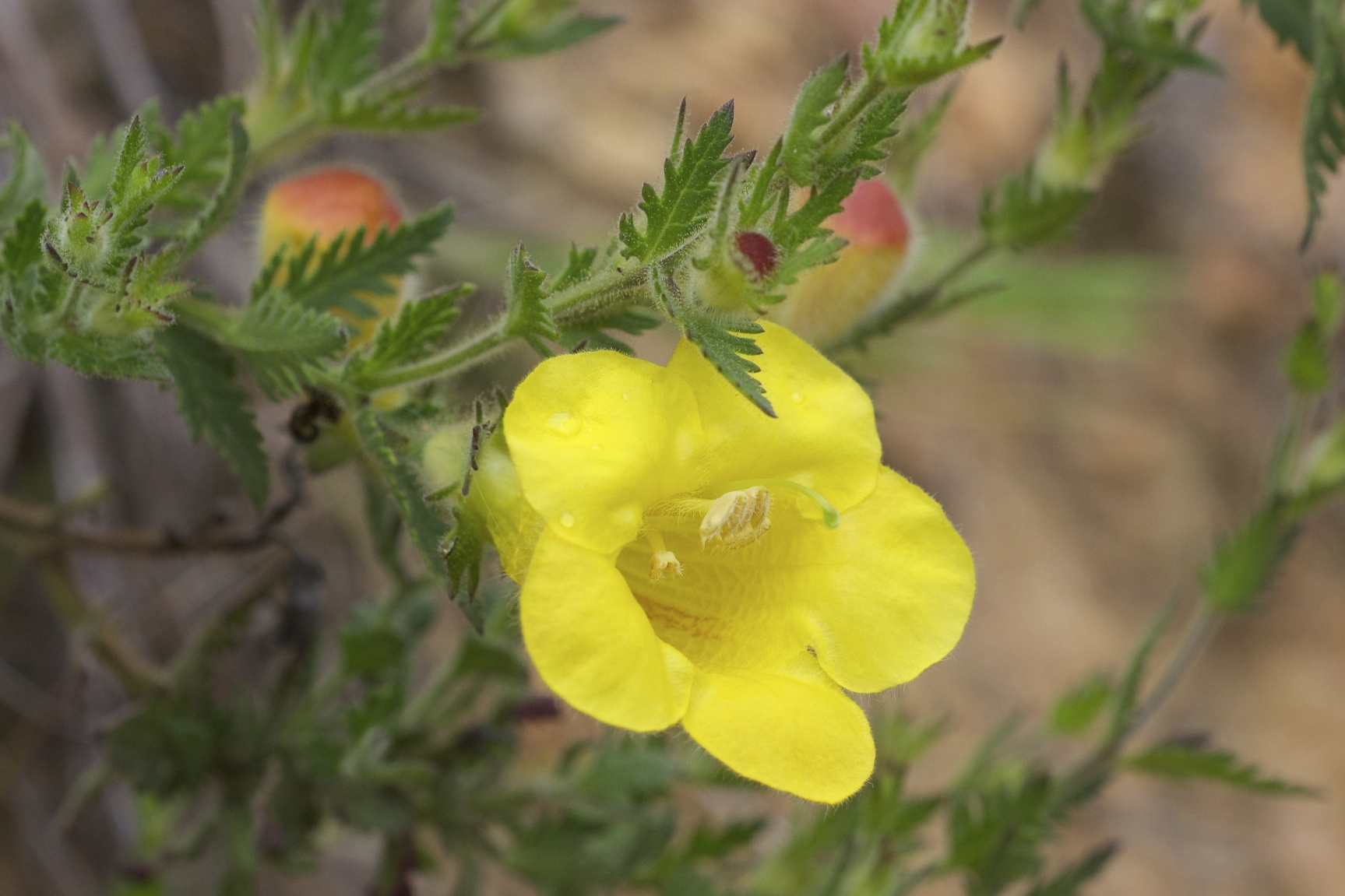
- Aureolaria pectinata

Scientific classification
- Kingdom: Plantae
- Clade: Tracheophytes
- Clade: Angiosperms
- Clade: Eudicots
- Clade: Asterids
- Order: Lamiales
- Family: Orobanchaceae
- Tribe: Pedicularideae
- Genus: Aureolaria; Raf.

Species
- See text

= Aureolaria =

Genus of flowering plants

Aureolaria, with the common name false foxgloves, is a genus of 8 species, native to North America.

Aureolaria plants are hemiparasitic, which is a character that in part describes the family Orobanchaceae.

Until recently the genus was aligned with members of the family Scrophulariaceae. As a result of numerous molecular phylogenetic studies based on various chloroplast DNA (cpDNA) loci, it was shown to be more closely related to members of the Orobanchaceae.

== Species ==
- Aureolaria flava (L.) Farw.
- Aureolaria grandiflora (Benth.) Pennell
- Aureolaria greggii (S.Watson) Pennell
- Aureolaria levigata (Raf.) Raf.
- Aureolaria patula (Chapm.) Pennell
- Aureolaria pectinata (Nutt.) Pennell
- Aureolaria pedicularia (L.) Raf.
- Aureolaria virginica (L.) Pennell
