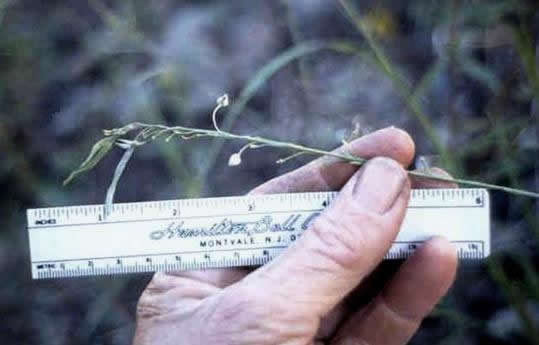
- Pennellia tricornuta

Scientific classification
- Kingdom: Plantae
- Clade: Tracheophytes
- Clade: Angiosperms
- Clade: Eudicots
- Clade: Rosids
- Order: Brassicales
- Family: Brassicaceae
- Genus: Pennellia; Nieuwl.

Synonyms
- Heterothrix (B.L.Rob.) Rydb.; Lamprophragma O.E.Schulz

= Pennellia =

Genus of flowering plant

Pennellia is a genus of flowering plants belonging to the family Brassicaceae.

Its native range is from western central and southern central USA (Arizona, Colorado, New Mexico and Texas) and Mexico, to Central America (Costa Rica and Guatemala), Bolivia to southern South America (Argentina and Chile).

The genus name of Pennellia is in honour of Francis W. Pennell (1886–1952), an American botanist best known for his studies of the Scrophulariaceae. It was first described and published in Amer. Midl. Naturalist Vol.5 on page 224 in 1918.

== Species ==
The following species are recognised in the genus Pennellia:

- Pennellia boliviensis (Muschl.) Al-Shehbaz
- Pennellia brachycarpa Beilstein & Al-Shehbaz
- Pennellia lasiocalycina (O.E.Schulz) Rollins
- Pennellia lechleri (E.Fourn.) Al-Shehbaz & C.D.Bailey
- Pennellia longifolia (Benth.) Rollins
- Pennellia micrantha (A.Gray) Nieuwl.
- Pennellia microsperma (Rollins) R.A.Price, C.D.Bailey & Al-Shehbaz
- Pennellia parvifolia (Phil.) Al-Shehbaz & C.D.Bailey
- Pennellia patens (O.E.Schulz) Rollins
- Pennellia tricornuta (Rollins) R.A.Price, C.D.Bailey & Al-Shehbaz
- Pennellia yalaensis Salariato & Al-Shehbaz
