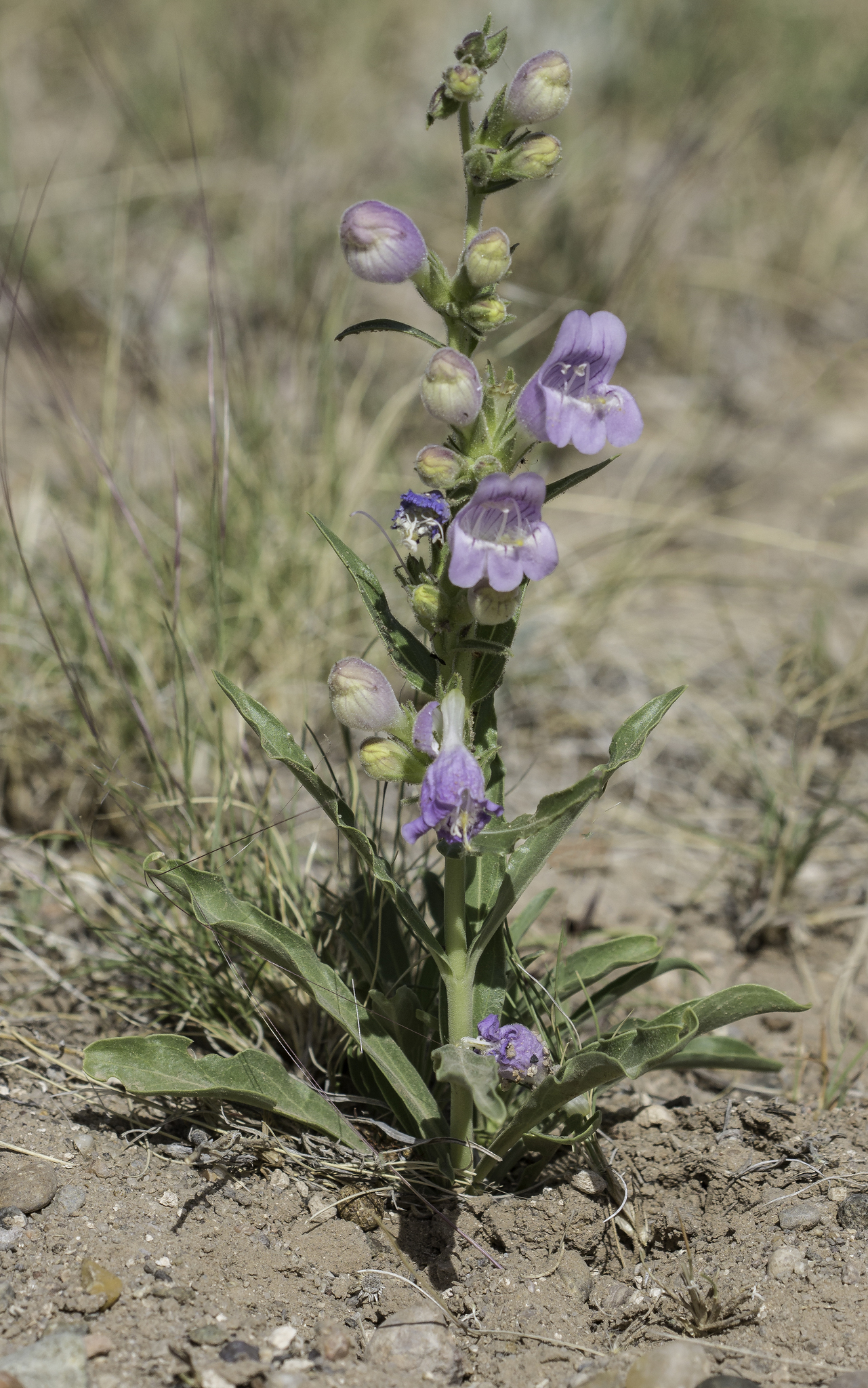
- Near White Rock, New Mexico

Scientific classification
- Kingdom: Plantae
- Clade: Tracheophytes
- Clade: Angiosperms
- Clade: Eudicots
- Clade: Asterids
- Order: Lamiales
- Family: Plantaginaceae
- Genus: Penstemon
- Species: P. jamesii

Binomial name
- Penstemon jamesii Benth.

Synonyms
- Penstemon albidus; Penstemon similis

= Penstemon jamesii =

Plant species in the family

Penstemon jamesii, the James penstemon, is as species of flowering plant in the Veronica family from the southwestern United States and northern Mexico.

== Description ==
James penstemon is a herbaceous plant that usually grows 10–45 centimeters tall, though occasionally reaching as much as 52 cm, depending on the availability of water. It has a taproot topped by a woody caudex that can be branch or unbranched. Each plant can have as many as ten flowering stems, though more usually just one to seven. They grow straight upward or outwards before cuving upright and range from nearly hairless to covered in backwards facing hairs near the base and are covered in glandular hairs nearer the top.

The leaves grow from both the base of the plant and from the stems. They are not leathery and can be hairless or have the same retrorse, backwards facing, hairs as the stem. Hairs are most frequently found on the midvein of the leaf on its upper side. They range in color from shiny green to nearly gray-green and might have smooth or toothed edges. The basal leaves and lowest ones on the stems measure 2–10.5 cm long and just 2–13 millimeters wide. There are three to six pairs of leaves on the stems. The upper ones measure 2 to 11 cm long and 0.5 to 1.5 cm wide with a lanceolate to linear shape, like the head of a spear to resembling a blade of grass. The bracts under the groups of flowers are large, almost leaf-like, and often are longer than the flowers.

The inflorescence is the upper 5 to 24 cm of the flowering stem and has two to eight groups of flowers along its length, all facing in the same direction away from the stem. At each attachment point there will be two cymes, branched substems, with two to five flowers each. The flower is noticeably two lipped, with the lower lobes angled backwards and the upper lobes projecting forward. The flowers are showy and blue to lavender in color with dark purple floral guide lines extending into the throat. The four stamens do not extend out of the flower, but the noticeable staminode covered in bright golden hairs does. It can bloom as early as May or as late as July in its native habitat.

Though very similar, coiled anther penstemon (Penstemon ophianthus) and shortstem penstemon (Penstemon breviculus) have significantly shorter flower corollas than James' penstemon. The natural ranges of coiled anther penstemon and James' penstemon do not overlap.

== Taxonomy ==
The first valid scientific description and name for Penstemon jamesii was published by George Bentham in 1846. Prior to this, in 1827 John Torrey published a description of Penstemon albidus, an illegitimate name due to the 1818 publication by Thomas Nuttall for another species. The botanist David D. Keck was of the opinion that Penstemon ophianthus and Penstemon breviculus were subspecies of Penstemon jamesii, but this is not accepted by other botanists. It is classified in the genus Penstemon within the wider family Plantaginaceae and has three synonyms.

Table of Synonyms
Name	Year	Rank	Notes
Penstemon albidus Torr.	1827	species	= het., nom. illeg.
Penstemon jamesii subsp. typicus D.D.Keck	1938	subspecies	≡ hom., not validly publ.
Penstemon similis A.Nelson	1898	species	= het.
Notes: ≡ homotypic synonym; = heterotypic synonym

=== Names ===
Penstemon jamesii is known by the common names James penstemon, James' penstemon, James beardtongue,, and James' beardtongue.

== Range and habitat ==
James penstemon is native to Colorado, Kansas, New Mexico, and Texas in the United States and Coahuila and Nuevo León in Mexico. However, the northern edge of its range is Las Animas and Baca counties in Colorado and Morton County, Kansas; the species grows nowhere else in either state. It grows in many parts of New Mexico, particularly on the eastern plains of the state. In Texas it is found in the most western part of the state. It grows at elevations of 1,100 to 2,300 meters (3,600 to 7,500 ft).

It is associated with the shortgrass prairie and the sagebrush steppe and grows in sandy, rocky, or loamy soils.

== See also ==
List of Penstemon species
