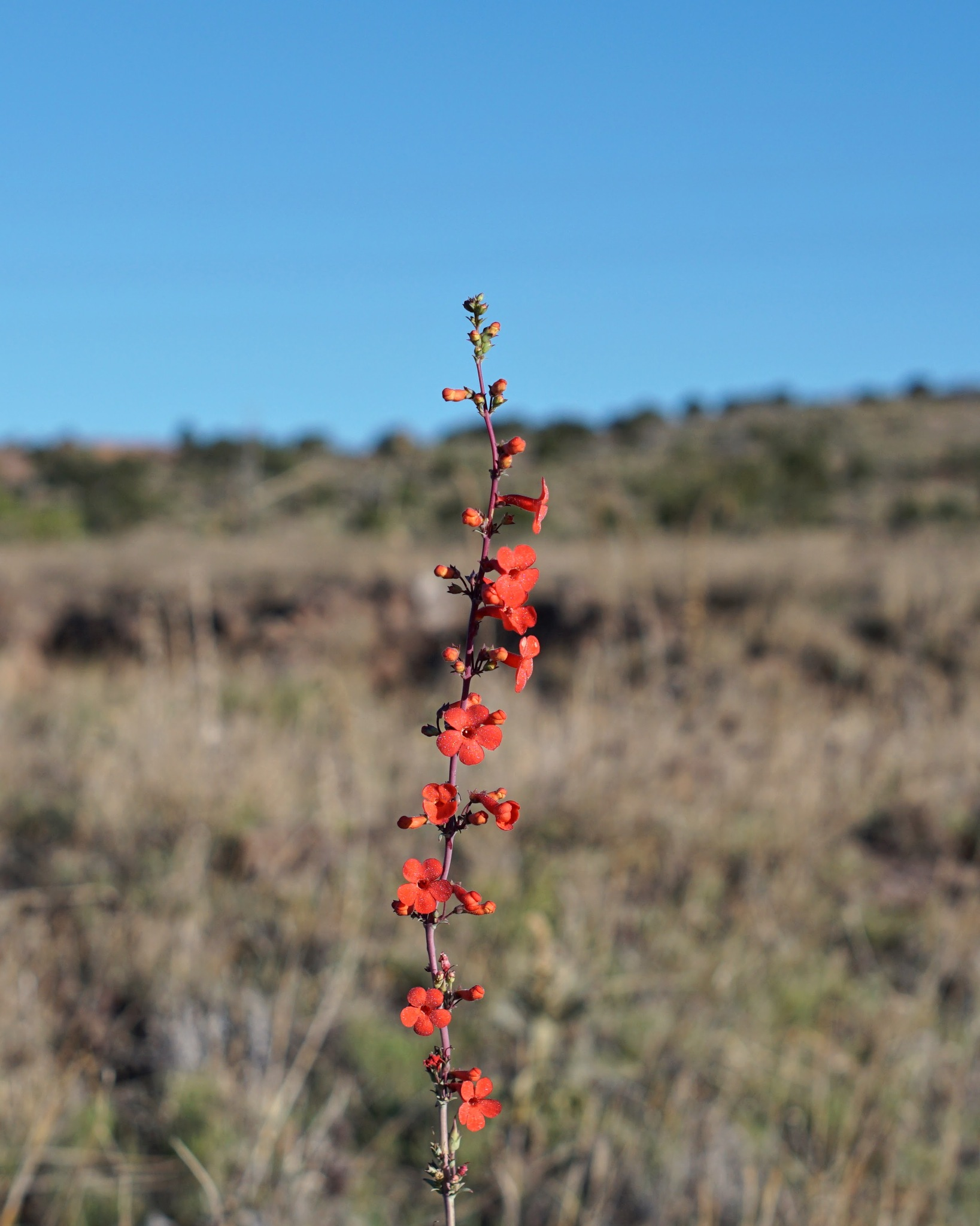
- Near Silver City, New Mexico

Conservation status
- Apparently Secure (NatureServe)

Scientific classification
- Kingdom: Plantae
- Clade: Tracheophytes
- Clade: Angiosperms
- Clade: Eudicots
- Clade: Asterids
- Order: Lamiales
- Family: Plantaginaceae
- Genus: Penstemon
- Species: P. superbus

Binomial name
- Penstemon superbus A.Nelson

Synonyms
- Penstemon puniceus; Penstemon puniceus var. parryi

= Penstemon superbus =

Plant species in the veronica family

Penstemon superbus, the superb penstemon, is a species of penstemon from the Southwestern United States and Northern Mexico near the international border.

== Description ==
Superb penstemons have flowering stems that are typically 30 to 120 centimeters (12–47 in), but occasionally as much as 1.6 meters (5.2 ft) tall. The hairless stems are glaucous, covered in surface waxes giving a gray-blue cast to the underlying color, which can be red-purple.

Its leaves are also hairless and glaucous and are both attached to the stems and directly to the base of the plants, but these lower basal leaves are often missing when flowering. The basal leaves and the lowest ones on the stems are 4–16 centimeters long but just 1.4–4 cm wide. The stems have three to eight leaf pairs with the upper ones typically measuring 4.4–11.5 cm long, though occasionally as short as 1.7 cm.

The flowers are trumpet shaped and only weakly two-lipped, each of the five lobes nearly the same size and spacing around the mouth of the flower. The fused petals are coral-pink to solidly red and 1.7–2.2 cm long; they never have floral guide lines. They are attached to the inflorescence in 9 to 20 well spaced groups, though usually there are not more than twelve. Each point of attachment can have one to nine flowers. Flowering is typically in April, May, or June, but can occasionally be as early as March.

The fruit is a capsule that is 1–1.3 cm long and 0.5–0.8 cm wide.

It is very similar in appearance to desert penstemon (Penstemon parryi), but has longer and narrower leaves as well as flowers that are more scarlet rather than rosy-pink.

== Taxonomy ==
Penstemon superbus was scientifically described by Aven Nelson in 1904. It is classified in the genus Penstemon within the Plantaginaceae family. It has no subspecies or varieties. It has been previously described in 1859 by Asa Gray with the name Penstemon puniceus, however this name had already been used in 1843 for a synonym of Penstemon hartwegii, making it an illegitimate name due to being a later homonym. At the same time Gray published a variety he named Penstemon puniceus var. parryi. It is very similar to Penstemon parryi and appears to hybridize with it producing plants with characteristics halfway between the two.

=== Names ===
The species name, superbus, is Botanical Latin meaning 'superb' or 'magnificent'. Penstemon superbus is known by the common names superb penstemon or superb beardtongue.

== Range and habitat ==
Superb penstemons are native to the northern Mexico and the southwestern United States. The Natural Resources Conservation Service reports the species as growing in just Grant and Hidalgo counties in southwestern New Mexico. In Arizona six counties in the eastern and southern parts of the state. In Mexico it also grows in two states Sonora in northwestern Mexico and Chihuahua to the east.

This species is associated with desert grasslands, pinyon–juniper woodlands, and oak woodlands on slopes and in arroyos. Superb penstemons grows on sandy or gravelly soils.
