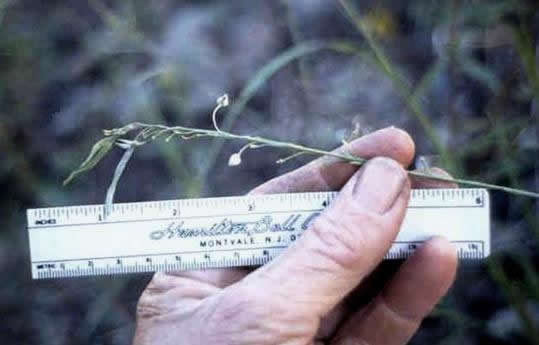

Conservation status
- Critically Imperiled (NatureServe)

Scientific classification
- Kingdom: Plantae
- Clade: Tracheophytes
- Clade: Angiosperms
- Clade: Eudicots
- Clade: Rosids
- Order: Brassicales
- Family: Brassicaceae
- Genus: Pennellia
- Species: P. tricornuta

Binomial name
- Pennellia tricornuta (Rollins) R. A. Price, C. D. Bailey & Al-Shehbaz

Synonyms
- Arabis tricornuta Rollins

= Pennellia tricornuta =

Species of flowering plant

Pennellia tricornuta (formerly Arabis tricornuta) is a species of flowering plant in the mustard family known by the common names Rincon Mountain rockcress and Chiricahua rockcress. It is endemic to Arizona in the United States, where it occurs in Cochise, Pima, and Santa Cruz Counties.

This perennial herb grows 15 to 90 centimeters tall. It has lance-shaped, toothed basal leaves up to 9 centimeters long and linear leaves higher on the stem. It produces flowers with lavender petals and green or purple sepals. The fruit is a silique up to 6.5 centimeters long.

This plant grows in rocky habitat, on slopes and roadsides, and under pines.
