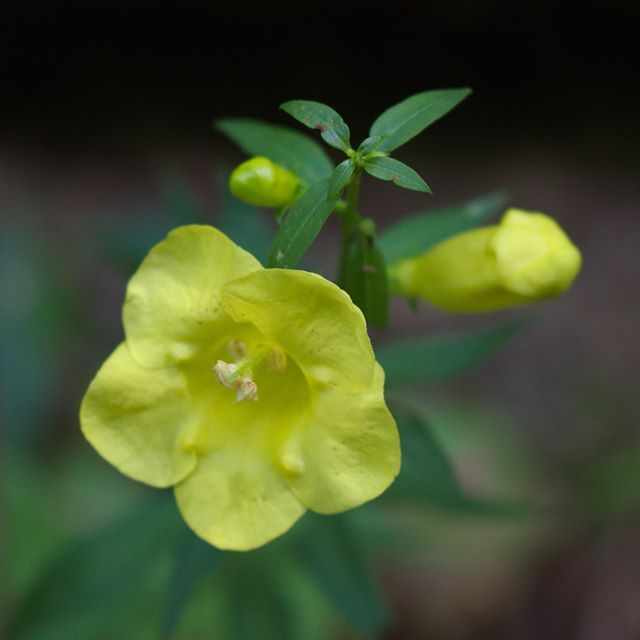

Scientific classification
- Kingdom: Plantae
- Clade: Tracheophytes
- Clade: Angiosperms
- Clade: Eudicots
- Clade: Asterids
- Order: Lamiales
- Family: Orobanchaceae
- Genus: Aureolaria
- Species: A. levigata

Binomial name
- Aureolaria levigata (Raf.) Raf.

Synonyms
- Gerardia levigata Raf. – basionym; Agalinis levigata (Raf.) S.F.Blake; Dasistoma integrifolia A.Gray; Dasistoma levigata (Raf.) Chapm.; Gerardia integrifolia A.Gray

= Aureolaria levigata =

Species of flowering plant

Aureolaria levigata, commonly known as entireleaf yellow false foxglove or Appalachian oak-leech, is a species of flowering plant in the family Orobanchaceae. It is native to much of the Appalachian Mountains and surrounding areas in the eastern United States. It is also found in a disjunct population in southwestern Mississippi.

== Description ==
Like other members of its genus, Aureolaria laevigata is hemiparasitic on oak tree roots. It produces tubular yellow flowers in late summer. It can be distinguished from its relative, A. flava by its tendency to have entire, simple leaves. It is a perennial herb with a sprawling semi-erect growth habit.

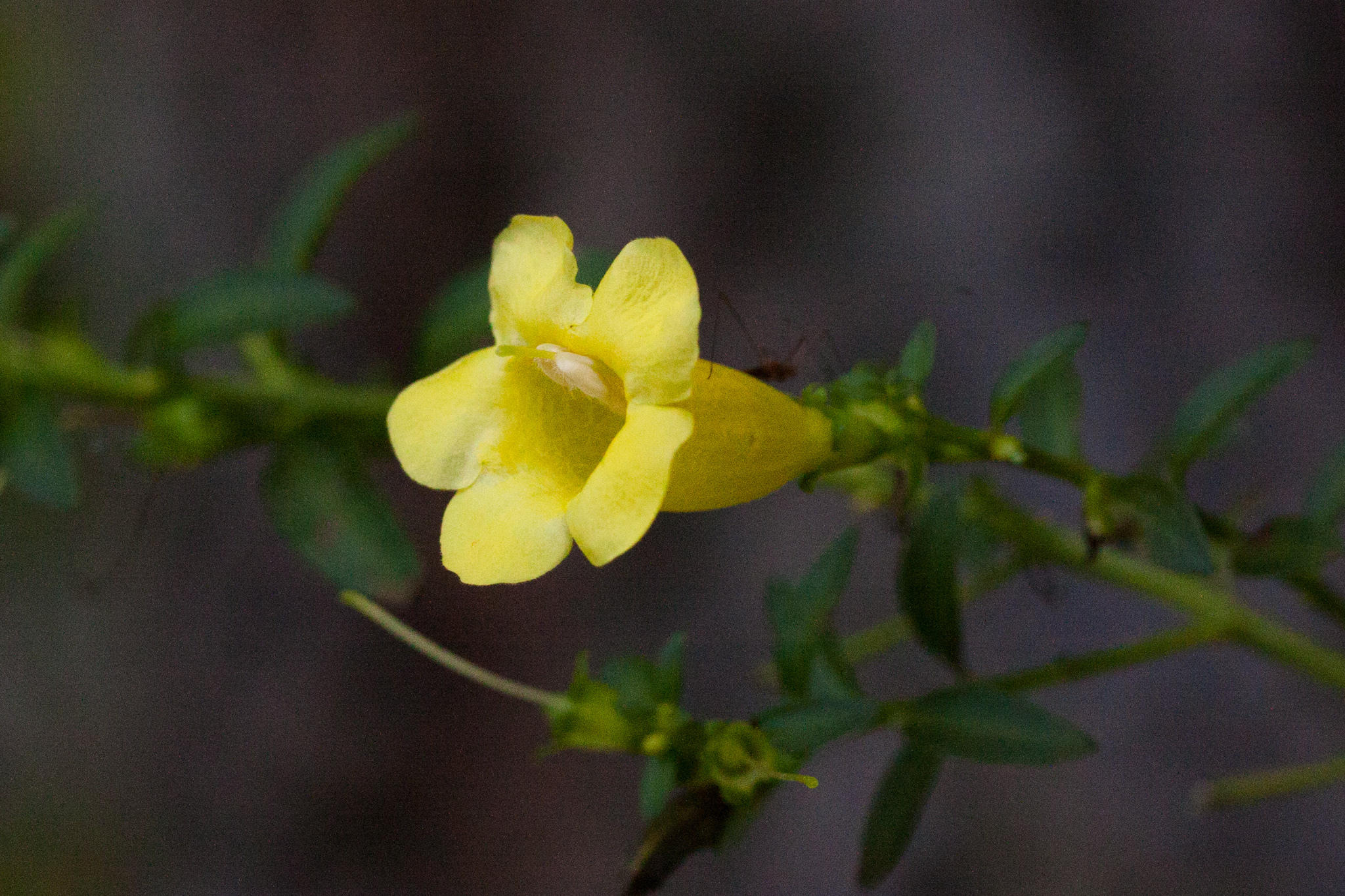
In Sullivan County, Tennessee

== Taxonomy ==
The Appalachian oak-leech was first formally described in 1820 by French botanist Constantine Samuel Rafinesque as Gerardia levigata and renamed, by the same author, as Aureolaria levigata in 1837.

The scientific name is frequently "corrected" as Aureolaria laevigata, though according to the Germplasm Resources Information Network, "Rafinesque consistently spelled this "levigata" and there is no basis for correcting his spelling". The spelling as levigata is also accepted in Kew's Plants of the World Online and International Plant Names Index.
