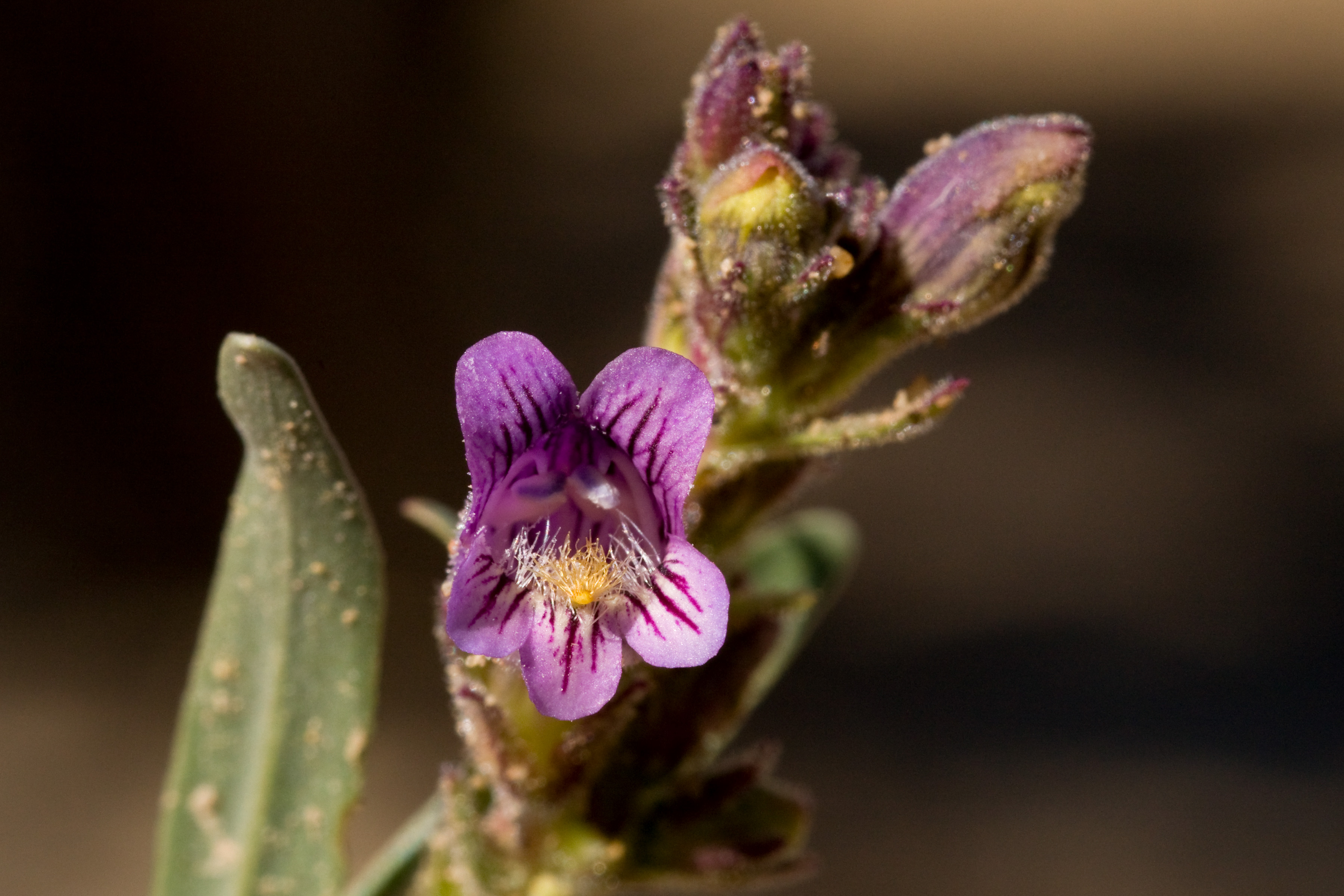

Conservation status
- Vulnerable (NatureServe)

Scientific classification
- Kingdom: Plantae
- Clade: Tracheophytes
- Clade: Angiosperms
- Clade: Eudicots
- Clade: Asterids
- Order: Lamiales
- Family: Plantaginaceae
- Genus: Penstemon
- Species: P. breviculus

Binomial name
- Penstemon breviculus (D.D.Keck) G.T.Nisbet & R.C.Jacks., 1960

Synonyms
- Penstemon jamesii subsp. breviculus D.D.Keck (1938)

= Penstemon breviculus =

Plant species in the plantain family

Penstemon breviculus, the narrow-mouth penstemon or shortstem penstemon, is a species of perennial flowering plant from the dry forests and steppes of the Colorado Plateau in the western United States.

== Description ==
Penstemon breviculus is a perennial plant that grows flowering stems that usually are between 8 and 20 centimeters (3 and 8 in) tall, but infrequently may grow to 35 cm (14 in). The stems are retrorsely hairy, covered in stiff backwards facing hairs. It is relatively long lived for a Penstemon.

Most of the leaves of Penstemon breviculus are basal, one that grow directly from the base of the plant. Leaves range in length from 33–78 millimeters (1–3 in) and 4–10 mm (1/4–1/2 in) in width. They vary greatly in shape and may be linear, narrow and grasslike, lanceolate, shaped like a spear's head, oblanceolate, reversed lanceolate with the wider portion past the mid-point, or elliptic, having two curved sides like ellipses. Usually the edges of the leaves is smooth or very shallowly toothed, though rarely they may have a few teeth.

The inflorescence is a 4 to 18 centimeters (2 to 7 in) long portion of the flowering stem, but usually will not exceed 11 cm (4 in). Along its length there will be three to five clusters flowers, each with a pair of attached flower groups called cymes. Each attachment node will have one to six flowers. The flowers are dark blue to purple with darker purple nectar guides and covered with fine hairs externally. They are 10–18 mm long and have a constricted opening with an expanded tube. The inside of the tube is covered in fine off-white to pale yellow hairs. The golden hairy staminode reaches the opening of the flower tube or slightly beyond and is 7-8 mm long. It flowers in May or June.

The fruit is a capsule that is 6–9 mm by 4.5–6 mm wide.

== Taxonomy ==
The first scientific description of Penstemon breviculus was by David D. Keck as a subspecies named Penstemon jamesii subsp. breviculus in 1938. In 1960 Gladys T. Nisbet and Raymond Carl Jackson revisited its status and reevaluated it as a species under its present name.

=== Names ===
Penstemon breviculus is known by the common names narrow-mouth penstemon and shortstem penstemon.

== Range and habitat ==
The range of Penstemon breviculus is extends over parts of the Colorado Plateau in four western states. In Arizona it is known from three counties, Mohave and Yavapai in the west and Apache in the east. Across the boarder into New Mexico it is found in three Four Corners counties, San Juan, McKinley, and Rio Arriba. It also grows in three southeastern Utah counties, San Juan, Grand, and Wayne. It grows in more western Colorado counties, six in total, Montezuma, La Plata, San Juan, San Miguel, Montrose, and Mesa County.

The elevation range for its habitat is from 1,500 to 2,000 meters (4,900 to 6,600 ft). Plants will grow on gravelly, sandy, or clay soils on open areas on sagebrush covered hillsides and in pinyon-juniper woodlands.

=== Conservation ===
In 1999 NatureServe evaluated Penstemon breviculus as vulnerable globally (G3). They also gave it the status of vulnerable (S3) in New Mexico, but imperiled (S2) in Colorado. At that time they rated it as critically imperiled (S1) in both Arizona and Utah.

== See also ==
List of Penstemon species
