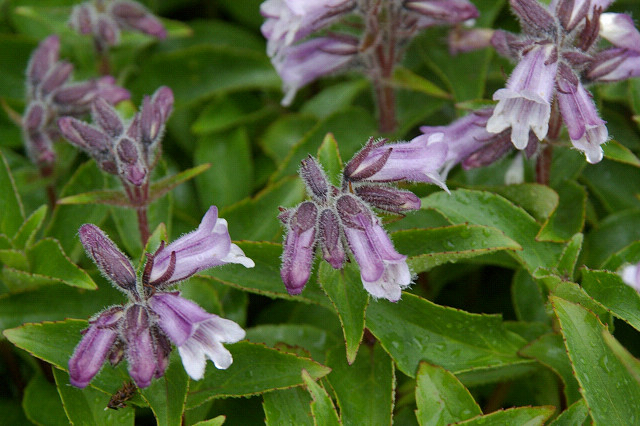

Scientific classification
- Kingdom: Plantae
- Clade: Tracheophytes
- Clade: Angiosperms
- Clade: Eudicots
- Clade: Asterids
- Order: Lamiales
- Family: Plantaginaceae
- Tribe: Cheloneae
- Genus: Pennellianthus; Crosswh.
- Species: P. frutescens

Binomial name
- Pennellianthus frutescens (Lamb.) Crosswh.

Synonyms
- Chelone frutescens Steud.; Digitalis ambigua Willd. ex Ledeb.; Digitalis dasyantha Pall. ex Lamb.; Leiostemon frutescens (Lamb.) Raf. ex Straw; Penstemon frutescens Lamb.

= Pennellianthus =

Species of flowering plant

Pennellianthus is a monotypic genus of flowering plants belonging to the family Plantaginaceae. It only contains one known species, Pennellianthus frutescens. The genus is within the tribe Cheloneae along with Penstemon, from which Pennellianthus was separated from.

Its native range is Russian Far East (within the regions of Kamchatka, Khabarovsk, the Kuril Islands, Magadan, Sakhalin) and also Japan.

The genus name of Pennellia is in honour of Francis W. Pennell (1886–1952), an American botanist best known for his studies of the Scrophulariaceae. The Latin specific epithet of frutescens means shrubby (referring to the habit of the plant). Both the genus and the species were first described and published in Amer. Midl. Naturalist Vol.83 on page 362 in 1970.
