= Gladys T. Nisbet =

American botanist

- Born: 11 September 1895; Grafton, Illinois, U.S.
- Died: 7 October 1994 (aged 99); Highlands Ranch, Colorado, U.S.
- Education: University of New Mexico
- Occupation: Botanist
- Known for: Penstemon research

Gladys Turner Nisbet (Grafton, Illinois, 11 September 1895 – Highlands Ranch, Colorado, 7 October 1994) was an American botanist known for researching the genus Penstemon, particularly in New Mexico. Nisbet earned a master's degree in Biology at the University of New Mexico expanding on work she had done as an undergraduate at New Mexico Normal University. A species of fossil coral which she discovered in Arizona, Iowaphyllum nisbeti, is named in her honor. The standard author abbreviation G.T.Nisbet is used to indicate this person as the author when citing a botanical name.
