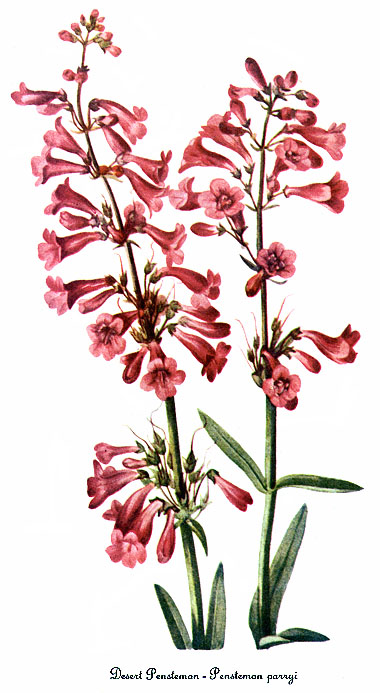

Conservation status
- Apparently Secure (NatureServe)

Scientific classification
- Kingdom: Plantae
- Clade: Tracheophytes
- Clade: Angiosperms
- Clade: Eudicots
- Clade: Asterids
- Order: Lamiales
- Family: Plantaginaceae
- Genus: Penstemon
- Species: P. parryi

Binomial name
- Penstemon parryi A.Gray

= Penstemon parryi =

Species of flowering plant

Penstemon parryi, the Parry's penstemon, Parry's beardtongue or desert penstemon, is a wildflower native to the Sonoran Desert of Southern Arizona and northern Mexico. It is a perennial that blooms in March and April. In the wild, plants flower in their second year. In cultivation, flowering is often achieved in the first year if seed is planted in the autumn.

At the base of the plant are lanceolate bluish green leaves that grow in a rosette pattern. From the base emerge the flower stalks, which are 2 to 5 feet high and topped with numerous deep-throated flowers, usually pink but selected horticulturally for red color.

Parry's penstemon is a desert plant. It thrives in full sun to part shade. A native lowland desert species, Parry's penstemon can survive on average Sonoran Desert rainfall, but not prolonged drought. It attracts hummingbirds. That plus the unusual splash of pink to red it provides make it a favorite xeriscape flower.

Parry's penstemon was named for Charles C. Parry, who served as surgeon-naturalist on the Mexican Boundary Survey in the mid 19th century.
