= Francis W. Pennell =

American botanist

Francis Whittier Pennell
- Born: August 4, 1886; Wawa, Pennsylvania
- Died: February 3, 1952 (aged 65); Media, Pennsylvania
- Scientific career
- Fields: Botanist

Francis Whittier Pennell (4 August 1886 – 3 February 1952) was an American botanist best known for his studies of the Scrophulariaceae. Employed by the New York Botanical Garden and then by the Academy of Natural Sciences of Philadelphia, he carried out botanical research in both North America and South America.

== Life ==
Pennell was born to a Quaker family on their farm near Wawa, Pennsylvania. Considered delicate by his family, he was excused from farm chores, which engendered in him a lifelong fear of water and incapacity with mechanical devices. Pennell was educated at Westtown School and then at the University of Pennsylvania, from which he received a B.S. in 1911 and a Ph.D. in 1913. Encouraged by John M. Macfarlane, the head of the botany department, Pennell wrote his doctoral thesis on the Scrophulariaceae (as then circumscribed), a group on which he was to become a world authority.

From 1914 to 1921, Pennell was a member of the staff at the New York Botanical Garden.

In 1921, Pennell became Curator of Plants at the Academy of Natural Sciences of Philadelphia. Undeterred by his phobias, Pennell engaged in a series of field researches on North American Scrophulariaceae, publishing an important monograph, The Scrophulariaceae of Eastern Temperate North America, in 1935.

Pennell died of a heart attack while attending Quaker Meeting in Media, Pennsylvania in 1952. He was survived by his wife, Anne, and one son.

In 1917, botanist Nieuwl. published Pennellia, a genus of flowering plants from America and South America, belonging to the family Brassicaceae and named in honour of Pennell. Then in 1970, botanist Crosswh. published Pennellianthus, a monotypic genus of flowering plants from Russia and Japan, belonging to the family Plantaginaceae and also named in honour of Pennell.
