= Thermodesulfobium acidiphilum =

Scientific classification
- Domain: Bacteria
- Kingdom: Bacillati
- Phylum: Bacillota
- Class: Clostridia
- Order: Thermoanaerobacterales
- Family: Thermodesulfobiaceae
- Genus: Thermodesulfobium
- Species: T. acidiphilum

Binomial name
- Thermodesulfobium acidiphilum Frolov et al. 2017

Type strain
- DSM 102892, KM B-3043, strain 3127-1

Species of bacterium

Thermodesulfobium acidiphilum is a moderately thermoacidophilic, Gram-negative, sulfate-reducing and obligately anaerobic bacterium from the genus Thermodesulfobium which has been isolated from geothermally heated soil from Uzon Caldera in Russia.
