= Brockia lithotrophica =

Scientific classification
- Domain: Bacteria
- Kingdom: Bacillati
- Phylum: Bacillota
- Class: Clostridia
- Order: Thermoanaerobacterales
- Family: Thermoanaerobacteraceae
- Genus: Brockia
- Species: B. lithotrophica

Binomial name
- Brockia lithotrophica Perevalova et al. 2013

Type strain
- DSM 22653, Kam1851, VKM B-2685

Species of bacterium

Brockia lithotrophica is a thermophilic bacterium from the genus Brockia which has been isolated from a sediment-water mixture from a hot spring in Uzon Caldera in Russia. This bacterium is rod shaped, spore-forming and obligate anaerobe. It is lithoautotroph and grows on a mineral medium with molecular sulfur, thiosulfate or polysulfide; it has optimal growth temperature in the range of 60 to 65 °C (140 to 149 °F) for pH 6.5, but it is able to grow between 46 °C (115 °F) and 78 °C (172 °F) and pH ranging from 5.5 to 8.5.
