= Moorella thermoautotrophica =

Scientific classification
- Domain: Bacteria
- Phylum: Bacillota
- Class: Clostridia
- Order: Thermoanaerobacterales
- Family: Thermoanaerobacteraceae
- Genus: Moorella
- Species: M. thermoautotrophica

Binomial name
- Moorella thermoautotrophica Collins et al. 1994

Species of bacterium

Moorella thermoautotrophica, previously known as Clostridium thermoautotrophicum, is a rod-shaped, endospore-forming bacterium belonging to the phylum Bacillota. It is thermophilic, strictly anaerobic and acetogenic, and was isolated from a hot spring in Yellowstone National Park USA.
