= Moorella stamsii =

Scientific classification
- Domain: Bacteria
- Phylum: Bacillota
- Class: Clostridia
- Order: Thermoanaerobacterales
- Family: Thermoanaerobacteraceae
- Genus: Moorella
- Species: M. stamsii

Binomial name
- Moorella stamsii Alves et al. 2013

Type strain
- CGMCC 1.5181, DSM 26217, DSM 26271, E3-O

Species of bacterium

Moorella stamsii is a thermophilic and anaerobic bacterium from the genus Moorella, which has been isolated from the suspended sludge in a municipal solid waste digester in Barcelona, Spain.
