= Thermoanaerobacter siderophilus =

Scientific classification
- Domain: Bacteria
- Kingdom: Bacillati
- Phylum: Bacillota
- Class: Clostridia
- Order: Thermoanaerobacterales
- Family: Thermoanaerobacteraceae
- Genus: Thermoanaerobacter
- Species: T. siderophilus

Binomial name
- Thermoanaerobacter siderophilus Slobodkin et al. 1999

Species of bacterium

Thermoanaerobacter siderophilus is a dissimilatory Fe(III)-reducing, anaerobic, thermophilic bacterium that was firstly isolated from the sediment of a hydrothermal vent found near the Karymsky volcano, in the Kamchatka peninsula, Russia. It is spore-forming, with type strain SR4^{T} (= DSM 12299^{T}).
