= Tepidanaerobacter acetatoxydans =

Scientific classification
- Domain: Bacteria
- Kingdom: Bacillati
- Phylum: Bacillota
- Class: Clostridia
- Order: Thermosediminibacterales
- Family: Tepidanaerobacteraceae
- Genus: Tepidanaerobacter
- Species: T. acetatoxydans

Binomial name
- Tepidanaerobacter acetatoxydans Westerholm et al. 2011

Type strain
- DSM 21804, JCM 16047, Re2, T1, T2

Species of bacterium

Tepidanaerobacter acetatoxydans is an anaerobic bacterium from the genus of Tepidanaerobacter.
