= Thermoanaerobacter pseudethanolicus =

Scientific classification
- Domain: Bacteria
- Kingdom: Bacillati
- Phylum: Bacillota
- Class: Clostridia
- Order: Thermoanaerobacterales
- Family: Thermoanaerobacteraceae
- Genus: Thermoanaerobacter
- Species: T. pseudethanolicus

Binomial name
- Thermoanaerobacter pseudethanolicus Onyenwoke et al. 2007

Species of bacteria

Thermoanaerobacter pseudethanolicus (formerly Clostridium thermohydrosulfuricum and later Thermoanaerobacter ethanolicus) is a thermophilic, strictly anaerobic, spore-forming bacteria that was first found at Yellowstone National Park in the United States. Because of its ability to efficiently ferment sugars, it is thought to be of potential use in producing industrial alcohol.
