= Caldanaerobius polysaccharolyticus =

Scientific classification
- Domain: Bacteria
- Kingdom: Bacillati
- Phylum: Bacillota
- Class: Clostridia
- Order: Thermoanaerobacterales
- Family: Thermoanaerobacteraceae
- Genus: Caldanaerobius
- Species: C. polysaccharolyticus

Binomial name
- Caldanaerobius polysaccharolyticus (Cann et al. 2001) Lee et al. 2008

Type strain
- ATCC BAA-17, DSM 13641, KMTHCJ

Synonyms
- Thermoanaerobacterium polysaccharolyticum

Species of bacterium

Caldanaerobius polysaccharolyticus is a Gram-positive thermophilic, anaerobic, non-spore-forming bacterium from the genus Caldanaerobius which has been isolated from organic waste leachate from Hoopeston in the United States.
