= Thermoanaerobacter mathranii =

Scientific classification
- Domain: Bacteria
- Kingdom: Bacillati
- Phylum: Bacillota
- Class: Clostridia
- Order: Thermoanaerobacterales
- Family: Thermoanaerobacteraceae
- Genus: Thermoanaerobacter
- Species: T. mathranii

Binomial name
- Thermoanaerobacter mathranii Larsen et al. 1998

Species of bacterium

Thermoanaerobacter mathranii is a thermophilic, anaerobic, spore-forming bacteria.

The bacteria was first isolated from an Icelandic hot spring. The growth range for the organism is 50 to 75°C and pH 4.7-8.8, with optimal growth conditions at 70-75°C and pH 7.0. T. mathranii stains Gram-variable, but is structurally Gram-positive. The species was named by the researchers, "in honor of the late Indra M. Mathrani, who contributed greatly to our understanding of thermophilic anaerobes from hot springs during his short career." A subspecies, T. mathranii subsp. alimentarius was found in canned food.
