= Thermoanaerobacter thermocopriae =

Scientific classification
- Domain: Bacteria
- Kingdom: Bacillati
- Phylum: Bacillota
- Class: Clostridia
- Order: Thermoanaerobacterales
- Family: Thermoanaerobacteraceae
- Genus: Thermoanaerobacter
- Species: T. thermocopriae

Binomial name
- Thermoanaerobacter thermocopriae Collins et al. 1994

Species of bacterium

Thermoanaerobacter thermocopriae, previously known as Clostridium thermocopriae is a bacterium belonging to the Bacillota.
