= Thermodesulfobium narugense =

Scientific classification
- Domain: Bacteria
- Kingdom: Bacillati
- Phylum: Bacillota
- Class: Clostridia
- Order: Thermoanaerobacterales
- Family: Thermodesulfobiaceae
- Genus: Thermodesulfobium
- Species: T. narugense

Binomial name
- Thermodesulfobium narugense Mori et al. 2004

Type strain
- DSM 14796, JCM 11510, Na82, NBRC 100082

Species of bacterium

Thermodesulfobium narugense is a sulfate-reducing, strictly anaerobic and moderate thermophilic bacterium from the genus Thermodesulfobium which has been isolated from a hot spring from Miyagi Prefecture in Japan. This microorganism is nonmotile, rod-shaped, Gram-negative and non-spore-forming.
