= Ammonifex degensii =

Scientific classification
- Domain: Bacteria
- Kingdom: Bacillati
- Phylum: Bacillota
- Class: Clostridia
- Order: Thermoanaerobacterales
- Family: Thermoanaerobacteraceae
- Genus: Ammonifex
- Species: A. degensii

Binomial name
- Ammonifex degensii Huber and Stetter 1996

Type strain
- DSM 10501, KC4

Species of bacterium

Ammonifex degensii is a Gram-negative bacterium from the genus Ammonifex which has been isolated from a volcanic hot spring from the Kawah Candradimuka crater, Dieng Plateau, Java, Indonesia.
