= Thermoanaerobacterium aotearoense =

Scientific classification
- Domain: Bacteria
- Kingdom: Bacillati
- Phylum: Bacillota
- Class: Clostridia
- Order: Thermoanaerobacterales
- Family: Thermoanaerobacteraceae
- Genus: Thermoanaerobacterium
- Species: T. aotearoense

Binomial name
- Thermoanaerobacterium aotearoense Liu et al. 1996

Species of bacterium

Thermoanaerobacterium aotearoense is a slightly acidophilic, anaerobic, thermophile first isolated from hot springs in New Zealand, hence its name. It is Gram-negative, peritrichously flagellated, rod-shaped forming oval terminal endospores. Strain JW/SL-NZ613^{T} (= DSM 10170) is its type strain. Its genome has been sequenced.
