= Caldanaerobius zeae =

Scientific classification
- Domain: Bacteria
- Kingdom: Bacillati
- Phylum: Bacillota
- Class: Clostridia
- Order: Thermoanaerobacterales
- Family: Thermoanaerobacteraceae
- Genus: Caldanaerobius
- Species: C. zeae

Binomial name
- Caldanaerobius zeae (Cann et al. 2001) Lee et al. 2008

Type strain
- ATCC BAA-16, DSM 13642, mel2

Synonyms
- Thermoanaerobacterium zeae

Species of bacterium

Caldanaerobius zeae is a Gram-positive thermophilic, anaerobic, non-spore-forming bacterium from the genus Caldanaerobius which has been isolated from organic waste leachate in Hoopeston in the United States.
