= Moorella humiferrea =

Scientific classification
- Domain: Bacteria
- Phylum: Bacillota
- Class: Clostridia
- Order: Thermoanaerobacterales
- Family: Thermoanaerobacteraceae
- Genus: Moorella
- Species: M. humiferrea

Binomial name
- Moorella humiferrea Nepomnyashchaya et al. 2012

Type strain
- 64_FGQ, DSM 23265, VKM B-2603

Species of bacterium

Moorella humiferrea is a Gram-positive thermophilic, anaerobic and endospore-forming bacterium from the genus Moorella, which has been isolated from sediments from the Grot geyser, Valley of Geysers, Kamchatka, Russia. This microorganism is able to grow and reduce iron(III) oxide when small amounts of humic acid are available.
