= Caldanaerobius fijiensis =

Scientific classification
- Domain: Bacteria
- Kingdom: Bacillati
- Phylum: Bacillota
- Class: Clostridia
- Order: Thermoanaerobacterales
- Family: Thermoanaerobacteraceae
- Genus: Caldanaerobius
- Species: C. fijiensis

Binomial name
- Caldanaerobius fijiensis Lee et al. 2008

Type strain
- ATCC BAA-1278, DSM 17918, JW/YJL-F3

Synonyms
- Caldanaerobium fijiensis

Species of bacterium

Caldanaerobius fijiensis is a thermophilic, obligately anaerobic and spore-forming bacterium from the genus Caldanaerobius which has been isolated from a hot spring in Fiji.
