= Thermoanaerobacter kivui =

Scientific classification
- Domain: Bacteria
- Kingdom: Bacillati
- Phylum: Bacillota
- Class: Clostridia
- Order: Thermoanaerobacterales
- Family: Thermoanaerobacteraceae
- Genus: Thermoanaerobacter
- Species: T. kivui

Binomial name
- Thermoanaerobacter kivui (Leigh and Wolfe 1983) Collins et al. 1994

Synonyms
- Acetogenium kivui Leigh & Wolfe 1983

Species of bacterium

Thermoanaerobacter kivui (formerly Acetogenium kivui) is a thermophilic, anaerobic, nonspore-forming species of bacteria.

T. kivui was originally isolated from Lake Kivu in Africa. The growth range for the organism is 50 to 72°C at pH 5.3-7.3, with optimal growth conditions at 66°C and pH 6.4. Although the organism stains Gram-negative, it shows a Gram-positive cell structure. The original genus Acetogenium was named because this organism principally produces acetic acid from substrates. T. kivui was originally named Acetogenium kivui, which was the only species within a new genus. However, further 16S ribosomal RNA studies put this bacterium into genus Thermoanaerobacter and the previous genus was no longer necessary.

T. kivui has been shown (with a technical readiness level of 4), to produce acetate with an input of H_{2} and CO_{2}. This process could be used as the initial stage in an alternative food source production system.

== See also ==
- List of bacterial orders
- List of bacteria genera
