= Tepidanaerobacter syntrophicus =

Scientific classification
- Domain: Bacteria
- Kingdom: Bacillati
- Phylum: Bacillota
- Class: Clostridia
- Order: Thermosediminibacterales
- Family: Tepidanaerobacteraceae
- Genus: Tepidanaerobacter
- Species: T. syntrophicus

Binomial name
- Tepidanaerobacter syntrophicus Sekiguchi et al. 2006

Type strain
- DSM 15584, JCM 12098, JL, NBRC 100060

Species of bacterium

Tepidanaerobacter syntrophicus is an anaerobic, moderately thermophilic and syntrophic bacterium from the genus of Tepidanaerobacter which has been isolated from sewage sludge in Niigata in Japan.
