= Thermoanaerobacter brockii =

Scientific classification
- Domain: Bacteria
- Kingdom: Bacillati
- Phylum: Bacillota
- Class: Clostridia
- Order: Thermoanaerobacterales
- Family: Thermoanaerobacteraceae
- Genus: Thermoanaerobacter
- Species: T. brockii

Binomial name
- Thermoanaerobacter brockii (Zeikus et al. 1983) Lee et al. 1993

Species of bacterium

Thermoanaerobacter brockii, formerly Thermoanaerobium brockii, is a thermophilic, anaerobic, spore-forming bacterium.

The bacterium was first isolated from Yellowstone National Park. The growth range for the organism is 35 to 80°C and pH 5.5-9.5, with optimal growth conditions at 65-70°C and pH 7.5. T. brockii stains Gram-positive. While originally thought to be non-sporeforming bacteria, it was later discovered that the organism produced spores that can survive heating at 115 °C for 80 min. The species was originally classified as Thermoanaerobium brockii, but further analysis put the bacteria into the genus Thermoanaerobacter. The species is named "in honor of T.D. Brock, a pioneer in the golden era of thermophily."
