= Moorella glycerini =

Scientific classification
- Domain: Bacteria
- Phylum: Bacillota
- Class: Clostridia
- Order: Thermoanaerobacterales
- Family: Thermoanaerobacteraceae
- Genus: Moorella
- Species: M. glycerini

Binomial name
- Moorella glycerini Slobodkin et al. 1997

Type strain
- ATCC 700316, DSM 11254, JW/AS-Y6

Species of bacterium

Moorella glycerini is a thermophilic, homoacetogenic, anaerobic and endospore-forming bacterium from the genus Moorella, which has been isolated from a hot spring from the Calcite Spring area from the Yellowstone National Park in the United States. This microorganism utilizes glycerol as a growth substrate and is considered Gram-positive type.
