= Caldanaerobacter uzonensis =

Scientific classification
- Domain: Bacteria
- Kingdom: Bacillati
- Phylum: Bacillota
- Class: Clostridia
- Order: Thermoanaerobacterales
- Family: Thermoanaerobacteraceae
- Genus: Caldanaerobacter
- Species: C. uzonensis

Binomial name
- Caldanaerobacter uzonensis Kozina et al. 2010

Type strain
- DSM 18923, K67, VKM B-2408

Species of bacterium

Caldanaerobacter uzonensis is a thermophilic, anaerobic and heterotrophic bacterium from the genus of Caldanaerobacter which has been isolated from a hot spring in Uzon Caldera in Russia.
