= Moorella thermoacetica =

Scientific classification
- Domain: Bacteria
- Phylum: Bacillota
- Class: Clostridia
- Order: Thermoanaerobacterales
- Family: Thermoanaerobacteriaceae
- Genus: Moorella
- Species: M. thermoacetica

Binomial name
- Moorella thermoacetica Collins et al. 1994

Synonyms
- Clostridium thermoaceticum

Species of bacterium

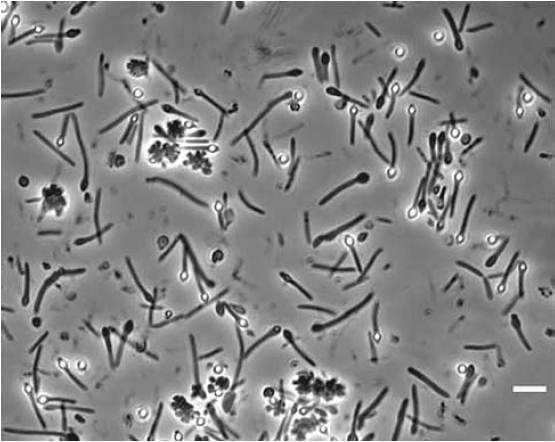
Cultivar of Moorella thermoacetica

Moorella thermoacetica, previously known as Clostridium thermoaceticum, is an acetogenic, thermophilic, strictly anaerobic, endospore-forming, bacterium belonging to the phylum Bacillota.

Researchers at the Lawrence Berkeley National Laboratory, including Peidong Yang, were able to induce M. thermoacetica to photosynthesize, despite its not being photosynthetic. It also synthesized semiconductor nanoparticles, thus using light to produce chemical products other than those produced in photosynthesis.
