= Thermoanaerobacter acetoethylicus =

Scientific classification
- Domain: Bacteria
- Kingdom: Bacillati
- Phylum: Bacillota
- Class: Clostridia
- Order: Thermoanaerobacterales
- Family: Thermoanaerobacteraceae
- Genus: Thermoanaerobacter
- Species: T. acetoethylicus

Binomial name
- Thermoanaerobacter acetoethylicus (Ben-Bassat and Zeikus 1983) Rainey and Stackebrandt 1993

Species of bacterium

Thermoanaerobacter acetoethylicus, formerly called Thermobacteroides acetoethylicus, is a species of thermophilic, nonspore-forming bacteria.

T. acetoethylicus was first isolated from Octopus Spring in Yellowstone National Park. The bacteria produce ethanol and acetic acid as fermentation products, but do not produce lactic acid. The growth range of T. acetoethylicus is 40-80 °C and pH 5.5-8.5, with the optimum growth temperature around 65 °C. The species was originally placed in its own new genus of Thermobacteroides in 1981. In 1993, based on further study, the species was moved into the genus Thermoanaerobacter.
