= Moorella mulderi =

Scientific classification
- Domain: Bacteria
- Phylum: Bacillota
- Class: Clostridia
- Order: Thermoanaerobacterales
- Family: Thermoanaerobacteriaceae
- Genus: Moorella
- Species: M. mulderi

Binomial name
- Moorella mulderi Balk et al. 2005

Type strain
- ATCC BAA-608, DSM 14980, TMS

Species of bacterium

Moorella mulderi is a Gram-positive, thermophilic, homoacetogenic, anaerobic and spore-forming bacterium from the genus Moorella, which has been isolated from a sulfate reducing bioreactor in Wageningen in the Netherlands.
