= Moorella perchloratireducens =

Scientific classification
- Domain: Bacteria
- Phylum: Bacillota
- Class: Clostridia
- Order: Thermoanaerobacterales
- Family: Thermoanaerobacteraceae
- Genus: Moorella
- Species: M. perchloratireducens

Binomial name
- Moorella perchloratireducens Balk et al. 2008

Type strain
- An10, ATCC BAA-1531, JCM 14829

Species of bacterium

Moorella perchloratireducens is a thermophilic, anaerobic, Gram-positive and endospore-forming bacterium from the genus Moorella, which has been isolated from an underground gas storage tank in Russia. One of the main characteristics of this microorganism is that it is able to completely reduce chlorate and perchlorate to chloride and oxygen.
