= Thermoanaerobacter italicus =

Scientific classification
- Domain: Bacteria
- Kingdom: Bacillati
- Phylum: Bacillota
- Class: Clostridia
- Order: Thermoanaerobacterales
- Family: Thermoanaerobacteraceae
- Genus: Thermoanaerobacter
- Species: T. italicus

Binomial name
- Thermoanaerobacter italicus Kozianowski et al. 1998

Species of bacterium

Thermoanaerobacter italicus is a species of thermophilic, anaerobic, spore-forming bacteria.

Thermoanaerobacter italicus was first isolated from hot springs in the north of Italy. The growth range for the organism is 45 to 78°C, with optimal growth conditions at 70°C and pH 7.0. The organism stains Gram-negative, although it has a Gram-positive cell structure. The species was named italicus in reference to the Italian hot springs in which it was first isolated. The organism was originally isolated because of its ability to digest pectin and pectate.
