= Brockia =

Scientific classification
- Domain: Bacteria
- Kingdom: Bacillati
- Phylum: Bacillota
- Class: Clostridia
- Order: Thermoanaerobacterales
- Family: Thermoanaerobacteraceae
- Genus: Brockia; Perevalova et al. 2013

Type species
- Brockia lithotrophica Perevalova et al. 2013

Species
- Brockia lithotrophica

Genus of bacteria

Brockia is a genus of thermophilic bacteria from the family Thermoanaerobacteraceae, with one known species (Brockia lithotrophica), an obligate anaerobe, spore-forming, rod-shaped microorganism.
