= Thermanaeromonas toyohensis =

Scientific classification
- Domain: Bacteria
- Kingdom: Bacillati
- Phylum: Bacillota
- Class: Clostridia
- Order: Desulfitibacterales
- Family: Neomoorellaceae
- Genus: Thermanaeromonas
- Species: T. toyohensis

Binomial name
- Thermanaeromonas toyohensis Mori et al. 2002

Species of bacterium

Thermanaeromonas toyohensis is a species of bacteria within the family Thermoanaerobacteraceae. This species is thermophilic, anaerobic, and can reduce thiosulfate. It was originally isolated from a geothermal aquifer more than 500 m below the surface of the Earth.
