= Ammonifex =

Scientific classification
- Domain: Bacteria
- Kingdom: Bacillati
- Phylum: Bacillota
- Class: Clostridia
- Order: Thermoanaerobacterales
- Family: Thermoanaerobacteraceae
- Genus: Ammonifex; Huber and Stetter 1996

Type species
- Ammonifex degensii Huber & Stetter 1996

Species
- A. degensii; A. thiophilus

Genus of bacteria

Ammonifex is a Gram-negative, extremely thermophilic, strictly anaerobic and motile genus of bacteria from the family Thermoanaerobacteraceae.

== Phylogeny ==
The currently accepted taxonomy is based on the List of Prokaryotic names with Standing in Nomenclature (LPSN) and National Center for Biotechnology Information (NCBI).

16S rRNA based LTP_10_2024

- Ammonifex
  - A. degensii Huber & Stetter 1996
  - A. thiophilus Miroshnichenko et al. 2008

120 marker proteins based GTDB 10-RS226

- Ammonifex
  - A. degensii
  - A. thiophilus

== See also ==
- List of Bacteria genera
- List of bacterial orders
