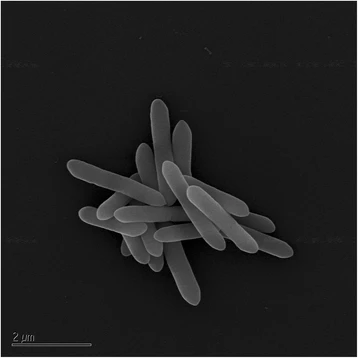
- T. thermohydrosulfuricus BSB-33

Scientific classification
- Domain: Bacteria
- Kingdom: Bacillati
- Phylum: Bacillota
- Class: Clostridia
- Order: Thermoanaerobacterales
- Family: Thermoanaerobacteraceae
- Genus: Thermoanaerobacter; Wiegel & Ljungdahl 1982

Type species
- Thermoanaerobacter ethanolicus Wiegel & Ljungdahl 1982

Species
- See text

Synonyms
- Acetogenium Leigh & Wolfe 1983; Thermoanaerobium Zeikus, Hegge & Anderson 1983; Thermobacteroides Ben-Bassat & Zeikus 1983

= Thermoanaerobacter =

Genus of bacteria

Thermoanaerobacter is a genus in the phylum Bacillota (Bacteria). Members of this genus are thermophilic and anaerobic, several of them were previously described as Clostridium species and members of the now obsolete genera Acetogenium and Thermobacteroides

== Etymology ==
The name Thermoanaerobacter derives from:
Greek adjective thermos (θερμός), hot; Greek prefix an (ἄν), not; Greek noun aer, aeros (ἀήρ, ἀέρος), air; Neo-Latin masculine gender noun, bacter, nominally meaning "a rod", but in effect meaning a bacterium, rod; Neo-Latin masculine gender noun Thermoanaerobacter, rod which grows in the absence of air at elevated temperatures.

== Species ==
The genus contains 15 species, namely

- T. acetoethylicus (Ben-Bassat and Zeikus 1983) Rainey and Stackebrandt 1993 (Latin noun acetum, vinegar; Neo-Latin adjective ethylicus, pertaining to ethyl alcohol; Neo-Latin masculine gender adjective acetoethylicus, intended to mean producing acetic acid and ethanol.) This species, formerly known as Thermobacteroides acetoethylicus, used to be the type species of Thermobacteroides, but was transferred over to the genus Thermoanaerobacter, while the other member of the genus Thermobacteroides, Thermobacteroides proteolyticus was reclassified as Coprothermobacter proteolyticus
- T. brockii (Zeikus et al. 1983) Lee et al. 1993 (Neo-Latin genitive case noun brockii, of Brock, named for Thomas Dale Brock who pioneered studies on the physiology and ecology of thermophiles.) this species was previously known as Thermoanaerobium brockii
- T. ethanolicus Wiegel and Ljungdahl 1982 (Type species of the genus; Neo-Latin noun ethanol, ethanol; Latin masculine gender suff. -icus, suffix used with the sense of pertaining to; Neo-Latin masculine gender adjective ethanolicus, indicating the production of ethanol.)
- "T. inferii" Orlygsson & Beck 2007
- T. italicus Kozianowski et al. 1998 (Latin masculine gender adjective italicus, pertaining to Italy, where the organism was isolated.)
- "T. keratinophilus" Riesen & Antranikian 2001
- T. kivui (Leigh and Wolfe 1983) Collins et al. 1994 (Neo-Latin genitive case noun kivui, pertaining to Kivu, named for its source, Lake Kivu.) This species used to be known as Acetogenium kivui (sole member of the former genus) before being transferred in this genus
- T. mathranii Larsen et al. 1998 (Neo-Latin genitive case noun mathranii, of Mathrani, in honor of the late Indra M. Mathrani, who contributed to the understanding of thermophilic anaerobes from hot springs during his short career.)
- T. pentosaceus Tomás, Karakashev & Angelidaki 2013
- T. pseudethanolicus Onyenwoke et al. 2007 (Greek adjective pseudēs, false; Neo-Latin adjective ethanolicus, a bacteria-specific epithet; Neo-Latin masculine gender adjective pseudethanolicus, a false (Thermoanaerobacter) ethanolicus.)
- T. siderophilus Slobodkin et al. 1999 (Greek noun sideros, iron; Neo-Latin adjective philus from Greek adjective philos (φίλος) meaning friend, loving; Neo-Latin masculine gender adjective siderophilus, iron-loving.)
- T. sulfurigignens Lee et al. 2007 (Latin noun sulfur, sulfur; Latin participle adjective gignens, producing; Neo-Latin participle adjective sulfurigignens, sulfur-producing.)
- T. sulfurophilus Bonch-Osmolovskaya 1998 (Latin noun sulfur, sulfur; Neo-Latin adjective philus from Greek adjective philos (φίλος) meaning friend, loving; Neo-Latin masculine gender adjective sulfurophilus, liking elemental sulfur.)
- T. thermocopriae (Jin, Yamasato & Toda 1988) Collins et al. 1994 (Greek noun thermē (θέρμη), heat; Greek noun kopria, dunghill; Neo-Latin genitive case noun thermocopriae, of heat compost.) This species was formerly known as Clostridium thermocopriae
- T. thermohydrosulfuricus (Klaushofer and Parkkinen 1965) Lee et al. 1993 (Greek adjective thermos (θερμός), hot; Neo-Latin masculine gender adjective hydrosulfuricus, pertaining to hydrogen sulfide; Neo-Latin masculine gender adjective thermohydrosulfuricus, indicating that the organism grows at high temperatures and reduces sulfite to H_{2}S.), this species also used to be Clostridium thermohydrosulfuricum
- T. uzonensis Wagner et al. 2008 (Neo-Latin masculine gender adjective uzonensis, pertaining to the Uzon Caldera, Kamchatka, Far East Russia.)
- T. wiegelii Cook et al. 1996 (Neo-Latin genitive case noun wiegelii, of Juergen Wiegel, in recognition of his contributions to the study of thermophilic anaerobes.)

Three former members of this genus, T. subterraneus, T. tengcongensis and T. yonseiensis, were reclassified as subspecies of Caldanaerobacter subterraneus

== Phylogeny ==
The currently accepted taxonomy is based on the List of Prokaryotic names with Standing in Nomenclature (LPSN) and National Center for Biotechnology Information (NCBI)

16S rRNA based LTP_10_2024

- Thermoanaerobacter
  - - T. sulfurigignens
    - T. uzonensis
  - - - T. italicus
      - - T. pentosaceus
        - - T. thermocopriae
          - - T. mathranii alimentarius Carlier, Bonne & Bedora-Faure 2007
            - T. mathranii mathranii Larsen, Nielsen & Ahring 1998
    - - - T. brockii lactiethylicus Cayol et al. 1995
        - - T. pseudethanolicus
          - - T. brockii
              - T. b. brockii (Zeikus et al. 1983) Lee et al. 1993
              - T. b. finnii (Schmid et al. 1986) Cayol et al. 1995
      - - T. kivui
        - - - T. siderophilus
            - - T. wiegelii
              - T. sulfurophilus
          - - T. acetoethylicus
            - - T. ethanolicus
              - T. thermohydrosulfuricus

120 marker proteins based GTDB 09-RS220

- Thermoanaerobacter
  - T. kivui
  - - - T. uzonensis
      - T. pseudethanolicus (incl. T. brockii)
    - - T. thermocopriae (incl. T. italicus & T. mathranii)
      - - T. wiegelii
        - T. ethanolicus (incl. T. siderophilus & T. thermohydrosulfuricus)

== See also ==
- Bacterial taxonomy
- Microbiology
- List of bacterial orders
- List of bacteria genera
