= Thermanaeromonas burensis =

Scientific classification
- Domain: Bacteria
- Kingdom: Bacillati
- Phylum: Bacillota
- Class: Clostridia
- Order: Desulfitibacterales
- Family: Neomoorellaceae
- Genus: Thermanaeromonas
- Species: T. burensis

Binomial name
- Thermanaeromonas burensis Ben Ali Gam et al. 2016

Species of bacterium

Thermanaeromonas burensis is a species of Gram-positive, non-motile, endospore-forming bacteria belonging to the family Thermoanaerobacteraceae that was isolated from a low-permeability argillaceous rock layer, at a depth of 490 m, in northern France. This species is thermophilic, strictly anaerobic, halotolerant, and can reduce thiosulfate.
