= Ammonifex thiophilus =

Scientific classification
- Domain: Bacteria
- Kingdom: Bacillati
- Phylum: Bacillota
- Class: Clostridia
- Order: Thermoanaerobacterales
- Family: Thermoanaerobacteraceae
- Genus: Ammonifex
- Species: A. thiophilus

Binomial name
- Ammonifex thiophilus Miroshnichenko et al. 2008

Type strain
- DSM 19636, SR, VKM B-2461

Species of bacterium

Ammonifex thiophilus is an extremely thermophilic, anaerobic, and facultatively chemolithoautotrophic bacterium from the genus Ammonifex which has been isolated from a hot spring in Uzon Caldera in Russia.
