= Thermoanaerobacter ethanolicus =

Scientific classification
- Domain: Bacteria
- Kingdom: Bacillati
- Phylum: Bacillota
- Class: Clostridia
- Order: Thermoanaerobacterales
- Family: Thermoanaerobacteraceae
- Genus: Thermoanaerobacter
- Species: T. ethanolicus

Binomial name
- Thermoanaerobacter ethanolicus Wiegel and Ljungdahl 1982 emend. Lee et al. 2007

Species of bacterium

Thermoanaerobacter ethanolicus is a species of thermophilic, anaerobic, non-spore-forming bacteria.

The bacteria were first isolated from hot springs in Yellowstone National Park. The bacteria ferment sugars into ethanol and carbon dioxide more than other anaerobes, hence the species name ethanolicus. The growth range of T. ethanolicus is 37-77°C and pH 4.4-9.9, with the optimum growth temperature at around 70°C.
