= Carboxydothermus pertinax =

Scientific classification
- Domain: Bacteria
- Kingdom: Bacillati
- Phylum: Bacillota
- Class: Clostridia
- Order: Carboxydothermales
- Family: Carboxydothermaceae
- Genus: Carboxydothermus
- Species: C. pertinax

Binomial name
- Carboxydothermus pertinax Yoneda et al. 2012

Type strain
- DSM 23698, NBRC 107576, Ug1

Species of bacterium

Carboxydothermus pertinax is a thermophilic and anaerobic bacterium from the genus Carboxydothermus which has been isolated from a hot spring on the Kyushu Island in Japan.
