= Thermodesulfobium =

Scientific classification
- Domain: Bacteria
- Kingdom: Bacillati
- Phylum: Bacillota
- Class: Clostridia
- Order: Thermoanaerobacterales
- Family: Thermodesulfobiaceae
- Genus: Thermodesulfobium; Mori et al. 2004

Type species
- Thermodesulfobium narugense Mori et al. 2004

Species
- Thermodesulfobium acidiphilum; Thermodesulfobium narugense

Genus of bacteria

Thermodesulfobium is a Gram-negative, strictly anaerobic, moderately thermophilic, non-spore-forming, and non-motile genus of bacteria from the family Thermodesulfobiaceae.
