= Zymophilus paucivorans =

Scientific classification
- Domain: Bacteria
- Kingdom: Bacillati
- Phylum: Bacillota
- Class: Negativicutes
- Order: Veillonellales
- Family: Veillonellaceae
- Genus: Zymophilus
- Species: Z. paucivorans

Binomial name
- Zymophilus paucivorans Schleifer et al. 1990

Species of bacterium

Zymophilus paucivorans is a species of anaerobic, Gram-negative, rod-shaped bacteria first isolated from spoilt beer. It is the type species of its genus.
