= Caldanaerobius =

Scientific classification
- Domain: Bacteria
- Kingdom: Bacillati
- Phylum: Bacillota
- Class: Clostridia
- Order: Thermoanaerobacterales
- Family: Thermoanaerobacteraceae
- Genus: Caldanaerobius; Lee et al. 2008

Type species
- Caldanaerobius fijiensis Lee et al. 2008

Species
- C. fijiensis; C. polysaccharolyticus; C. zeae

Synonyms
- Caldanaerobium (sic)

Genus of bacteria

Caldanaerobius is a genus of thermophilic, obligately anaerobic bacteria from the family Thermoanaerobacteraceae.

== Phylogeny ==
The currently accepted taxonomy is based on the List of Prokaryotic names with Standing in Nomenclature (LPSN) and National Center for Biotechnology Information (NCBI).

16S rRNA based LTP_10_2024

- Caldanaerobius
  - C. fijiensis Lee et al. 2008
  - - C. polysaccharolyticus (Cann et al. 2001) Lee et al. 2008
    - C. zeae (Cann et al. 2001) Lee et al. 2008

120 marker proteins based GTDB 10-RS226

- Caldanaerobius
  - C. fijiensis
  - C. polysaccharolyticus

== See also ==
- List of bacterial orders
- List of bacteria genera
