= Carboxydothermus islandicus =

Scientific classification
- Domain: Bacteria
- Kingdom: Bacillati
- Phylum: Bacillota
- Class: Clostridia
- Order: Carboxydothermales
- Family: Carboxydothermaceae
- Genus: Carboxydothermus
- Species: C. islandicus

Binomial name
- Carboxydothermus islandicus Novikov et al. 2011

Type strain
- DSM 21830, SET IS-9, VKM B-2561

Species of bacterium

Carboxydothermus islandicus is a thermophilic and anaerobic bacterium from the genus Carboxydothermus which has been isolated from a hot spring on Iceland.
