= Caloribacterium =

Scientific classification
- Domain: Bacteria
- Kingdom: Bacillati
- Phylum: Bacillota
- Class: Clostridia
- Order: Thermoanaerobacterales
- Family: Thermoanaerobacteraceae
- Genus: Caloribacterium; Slobodkina et al. 2012

Type species
- Caloribacterium cisternae Slobodkina et al. 2012

Species
- C. cisternae

Genus of bacteria

Caldanaerobius is a moderately thermophilic and anaerobic genus of bacteria from the family of Thermoanaerobacteraceae with one known species (Caloribacterium cisternae).

== See also ==
- List of Bacteria genera
- List of bacterial orders
