= Gelria =

Gelria may refer to:

- 1385 Gelria, a Main Belt asteroid
- Gelria (bacterium), a bacterium genus in the family Thermoanaerobacteriales
