= Caldanaerobacter =

Scientific classification
- Domain: Bacteria
- Kingdom: Bacillati
- Phylum: Bacillota
- Class: Clostridia
- Order: Thermoanaerobacterales
- Family: Thermoanaerobacteraceae
- Genus: Caldanaerobacter; Fardeau et al. 2004

Type species
- Caldanaerobacter subterraneus (Fardeau et al. 2000) Fardeau et al. 2004

Species
- "C. hydrothermalis"; "C. proteolyticus"; C. subterraneus; C. uzonensis

Synonyms
- Carboxydibrachium corrig. Sokolova et al. 2001; Carboxydobrachium (sic)

Genus of bacteria

Caldanaerobacter is a Gram-positive or negative and strictly anaerobic genus of bacteria from the family of Thermoanaerobacteraceae.

== Phylogeny ==
The currently accepted taxonomy is based on the List of Prokaryotic names with Standing in Nomenclature (LPSN) and National Center for Biotechnology Information (NCBI)

16S rRNA based LTP_10_2024

- Caldanaerobacter
  - C. subterraneus pacificus (Sokolova et al. 2001) Fardeau et al. 2004
  - - C. subterraneus tengcongensis (Xue et al. 2001) Fardeau et al. 2004
    - - C. subterraneus subterraneus (Fardeau et al. 2000) Fardeau et al. 2004
      - - C. subterraneus yonseiensis (Kim et al. 2001) Fardeau et al. 2004
        - C. uzonensis Kozina et al. 2010

120 marker proteins based GTDB 09-RS220

- Caldanaerobacter
  C. subterraneus (Fardeau et al. 2000) Fardeau et al. 2004

== See also ==
- List of bacterial orders
- List of bacteria genera
