= Tepidanaerobacter =

Scientific classification
- Domain: Bacteria
- Kingdom: Bacillati
- Phylum: Bacillota
- Class: Clostridia
- Order: Thermosediminibacterales
- Family: Tepidanaerobacteraceae
- Genus: Tepidanaerobacter; Sekiguchi et al. 2006

Type species
- Tepidanaerobacter syntrophicus Sekiguchi et al. 2006

Species
- T. acetatoxydans; T. syntrophicus

Genus of bacteria

Tepidanaerobacter is a genus of anaerobic, moderately thermophilic, syntrophic bacteria from the family Tepidanaerobacteraceae.

== Phylogeny ==
The currently accepted taxonomy is based on the List of Prokaryotic names with Standing in Nomenclature (LPSN) and National Center for Biotechnology Information (NCBI).

16S rRNA based LTP_10_2024

- Tepidanaerobacter
  T. syntrophicus

120 marker proteins based GTDB 10-RS226

- Tepidanaerobacter
  - T. acetatoxydans Westerholm, Roos & Schnurer 2025
  - T. syntrophicus Sekiguchi et al. 2006

== See also ==
- List of bacterial orders
- List of bacteria genera
