= Theophilus (disambiguation) =

Theophilus is a masculine given name. Theophilus or Theofilos may also refer to:

- Theophilus (crater), on the Moon
- MS Theofilos, a passenger/vehicle ferry built in 1975
- Theophilus (comic strip), an American religious comic strip from 1966 to 2002
- Theofilos (film), a 1987 Greek film about painter Theofilos Hatzimichail

== See also ==
- Emma Theofelus (born 1996), Namibian politician and government deputy minister
- thiophilus
