= Desulfovirgula =

Scientific classification
- Domain: Bacteria
- Kingdom: Bacillati
- Phylum: Bacillota
- Class: Clostridia
- Order: Thermoanaerobacterales
- Family: Thermoanaerobacteraceae
- Genus: Desulfovirgula; Kaksonen et al. 2007

Type species
- Desulfovirgula thermocuniculi Kaksonen et al. 2007

Species
- D. thermocuniculi

Genus of bacteria

Desulfovirgula is a genus of sulfate reducing, anaerobic, endospore-forming, Gram-positive, thermophilic, motile, rod-shaped bacteria, isolated from an underground mining site in an area of Japan characterized by high geothermal activity.

Up to now (December 2021) Desulfovirgula thermocuniculi is the sole known species in the genus.

Electron acceptors that this organism can utilize include sulfate, sulfite, thiosulfate and elemental sulfur, while H_{2} (in the presence of CO_{2}) and carboxylic acids can be utilized as electron donors.

== See also ==
- List of bacterial orders
- List of bacteria genera
