= Zymophilus =

Scientific classification
- Domain: Bacteria
- Kingdom: Bacillati
- Phylum: Bacillota
- Class: Negativicutes
- Order: Veillonellales
- Family: Veillonellaceae
- Genus: Zymophilus; Schleifer et al. 1990

Species
- Zymophilus paucivorans Schleifer et al. 1990; Zymophilus raffinosivorans Schleifer et al. 1990 (type sp.)

Genus of bacteria

Zymophilus is a genus of Bacillota bacteria classified within the class Negativicutes.
