= Mahella-1 RNA motif =

Mahella-1
- Consensus secondary structure and sequence conservation of Mahella-1 RNA

Identifiers
- Symbol: Mahella-1
- Rfam: RF03007

Other data
- RNA type: Gene; sRNA
- SO: SO:0001263
- PDB structures: PDBe

The Mahella-1 RNA motif is a conserved RNA structure that was discovered by bioinformatics. Seven Mahella-1 motif RNAs are found in Mahella australiensis, and no other organism has been (as of 2018) observed to contain Mahella-1 RNAs.

All seven Mahella-1 RNAs are located upstream of protein-coding genes, which could suggest that the RNAs function as cis-regulatory elements. However, it is unusual that 6 non-homologous genes are found downstream of Mahella-1 RNAs, and that these genes do not seem related to each other. cis-regulatory RNAs are generally located upstream of characteristic gene classes. Thus, Mahella-1 RNAs might correspond to small RNAs, or have some other function.
