= Pleasant Valley Conservancy State Natural Area =

State Natural Area in Wisconsin

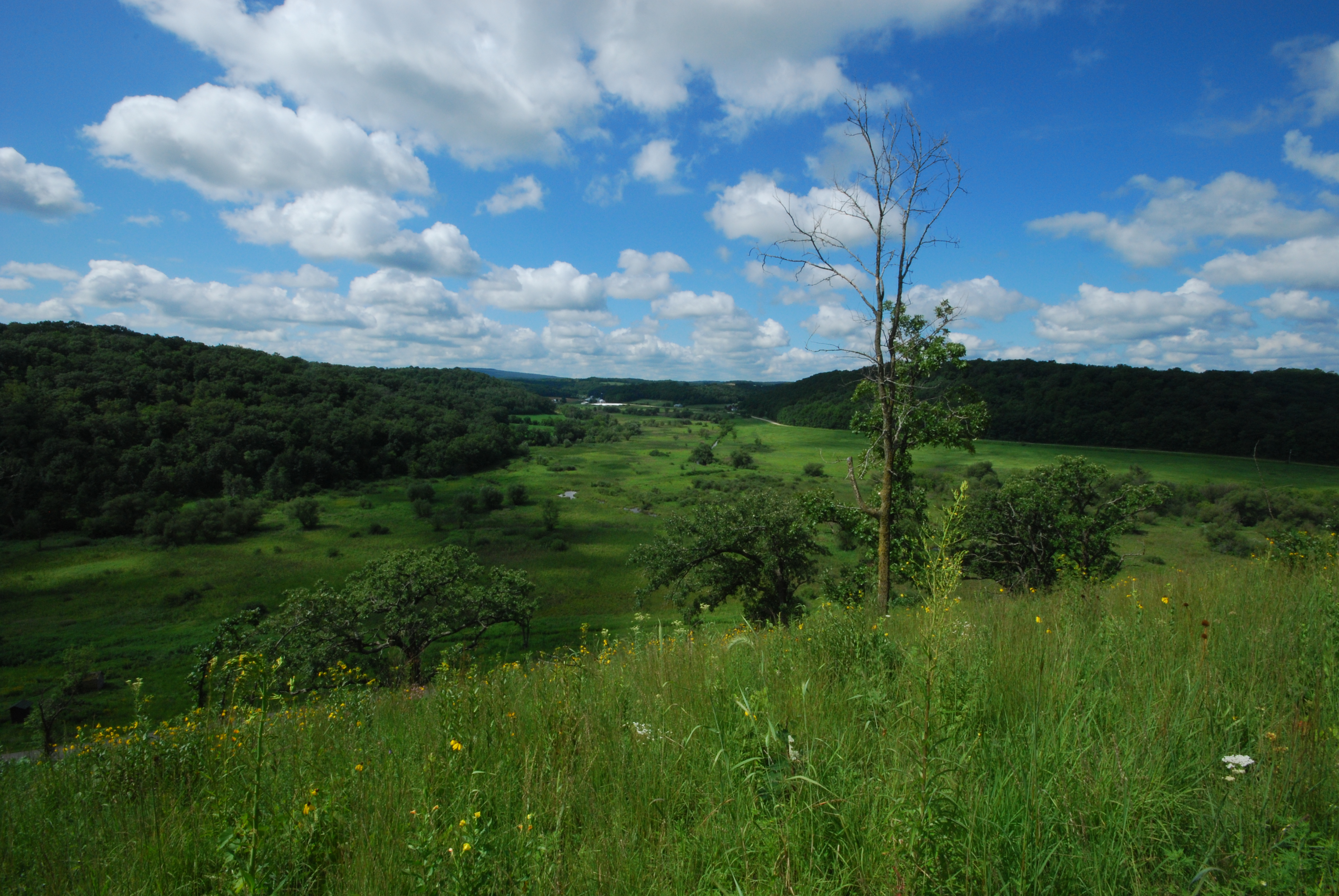

- Location within Wisconsin Location within the United States
- Location: Dane County, Wisconsin
- Coordinates: 43°06′19″N 89°48′25″W
- Area: 143 acres (58 ha)
- Established: 2007
- Website: Official website
- Wisconsin State Natural Areas

Pleasant Valley Conservancy is a Wisconsin Department of Natural Resources-dedicated State Natural Area. The area contains a variety of natural communities found in Wisconsin including oak woodland, oak savanna, dry and wet prairies, sedge meadow, shrub-carr, and an open marsh. Pleasant Valley Conservancy is located approximately 4 miles south of Black Earth, Wisconsin. Trails wind through the site.

== Description ==
Prairie remnants are present on the south-facing ridge and have recovered from previous agricultural use due to intensive management that began in 1995. Plant species include big bluestem, little bluestem, Indian grass, side-oats grama, wood betony, bird's-foot violet, purple prairie clover, wood sorrel, and the uncommon prairie turnip (Pediomelum esculentum). Numerous large bur and white oaks are found further up the slope where the land transitions to oak savannas. Plant species found here include numerous grass, sedge, and forb species including the state-endangered purple milkweed (Asclepias purpurascens). Other plants include silky rye, bottlebrush grass, ear-leaved brome, leadplant, large-flowered yellow false foxglove, Canada milk-vetch, Illinois tick-trefoil, alum-root, shooting star, and spiderwort. Other rare plants present are the state-threatened giant yellow hyssop (Agastache nepetoides), and special concern upland boneset (Eupatorium sessilifolium). Over the ridgetop, the cooler north-facing slope is mostly oak woodland with red oak, basswood, hackberry, butternut, yellowbud hickory, and red maple. Spring ephemerals are abundant here, including bloodroot, Jacob's-ladder, large-flowered bellwort, yellow lady's-slipper orchid, large white trillium, and dutchman's breeches. Bird species found at this site include the red-headed woodpecker, blue-gray gnatcatcher, eastern wood pewee, tufted titmouse, eastern bluebird, yellow-throated vireo, scarlet tanager, black-billed cuckoo, and yellow-billed cuckoo. At the base of the south-facing slope is the spring-fed Pleasant Valley Creek, which travels through a wetland before emptying into East Blue Mounds Creek. Pleasant Valley Conservancy is owned in part by The Prairie Enthusiasts and by Tom Brock and his wife Kathie with management support from the Savanna Oak Foundation.

== Gallery ==
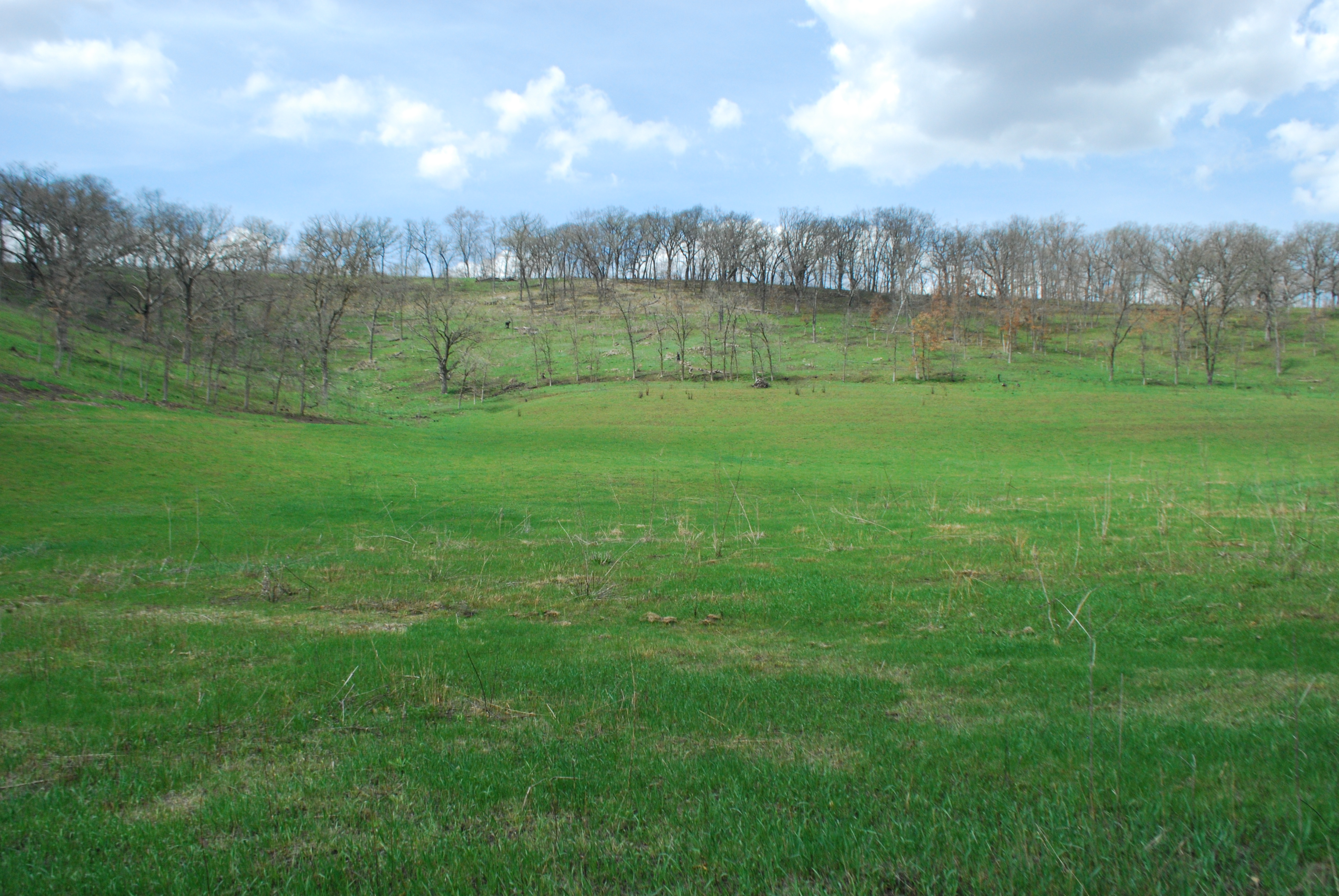
Spring Growth after Burn

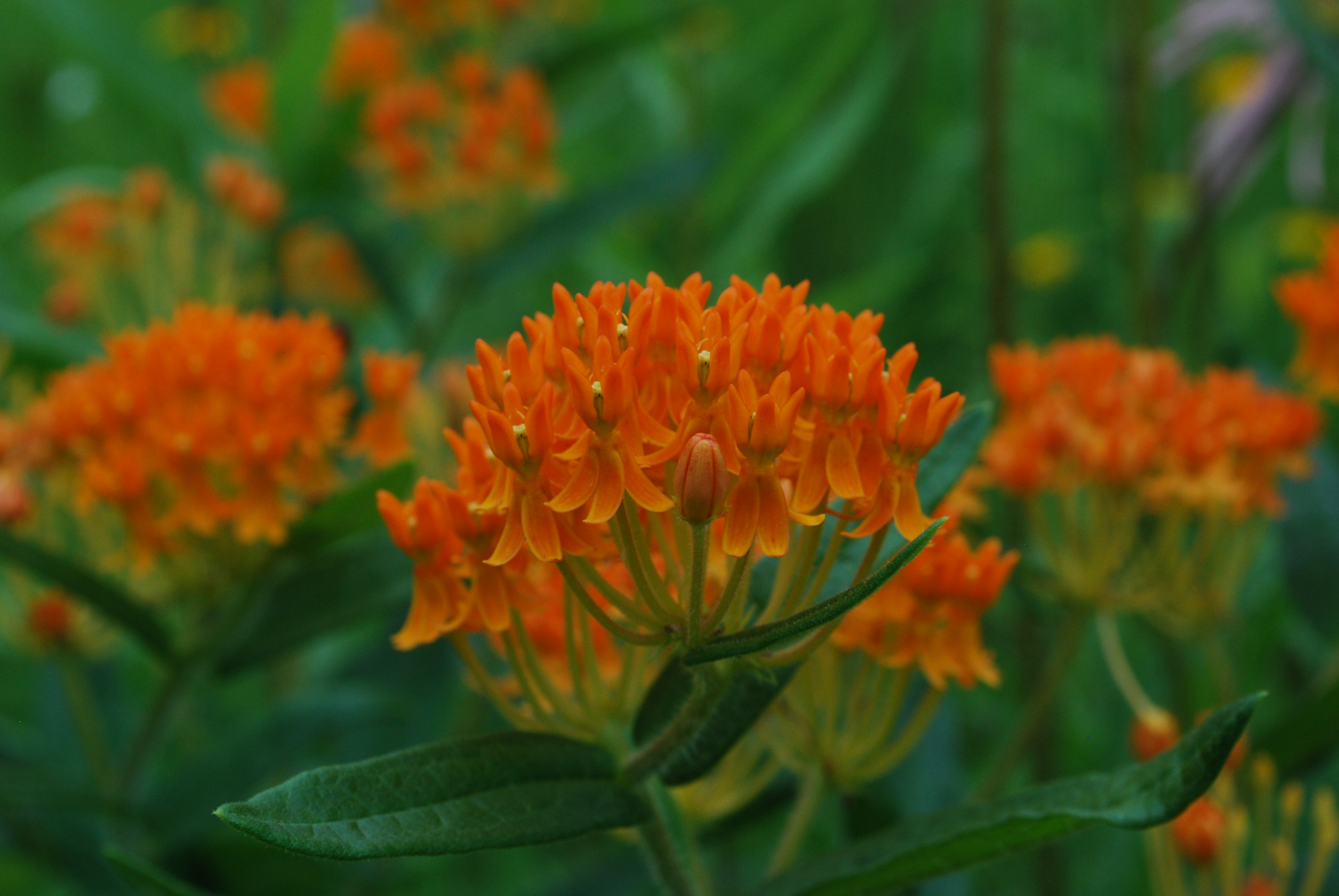
Butterfly Milkweed

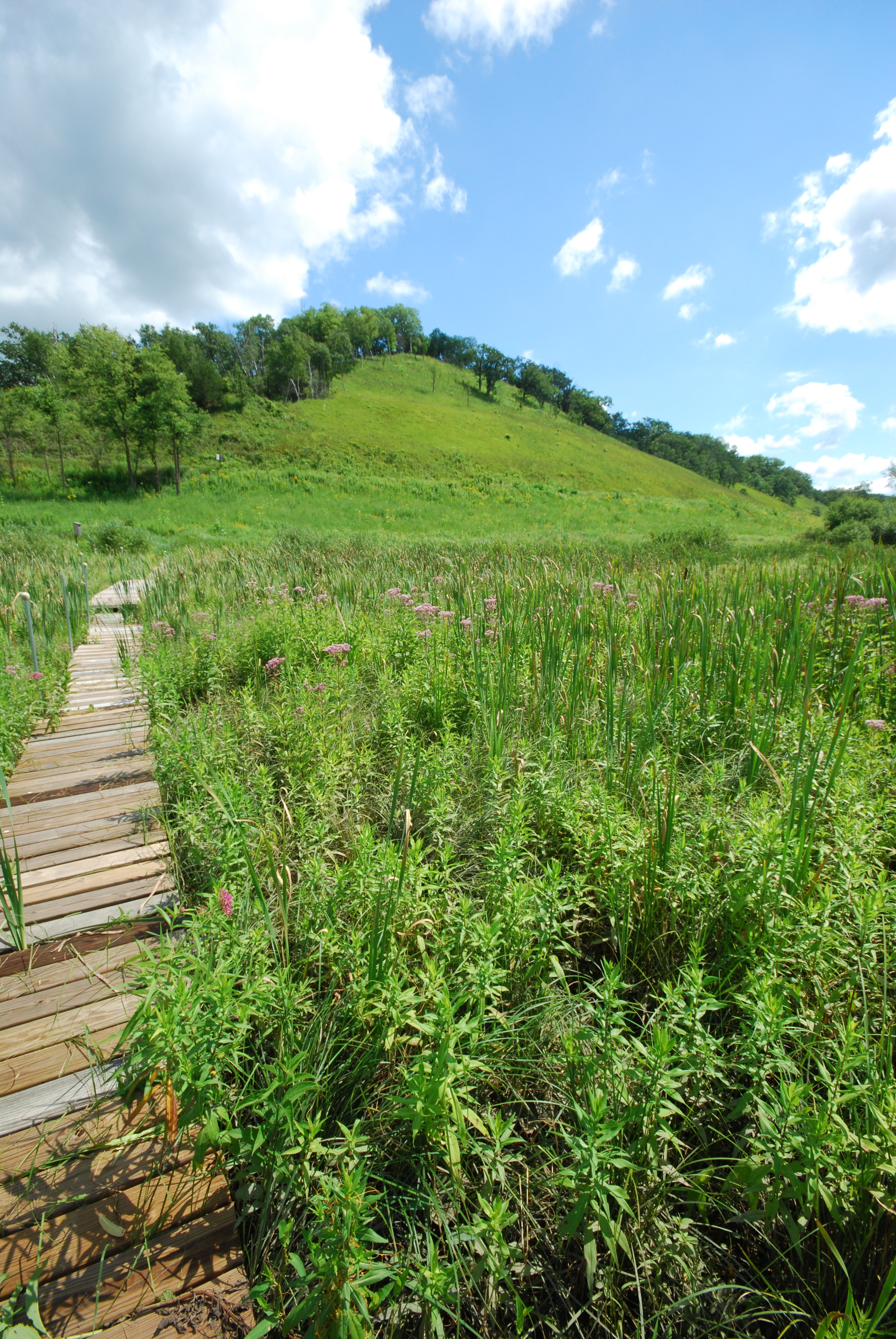
Wetland Boardwalk toward Ridge

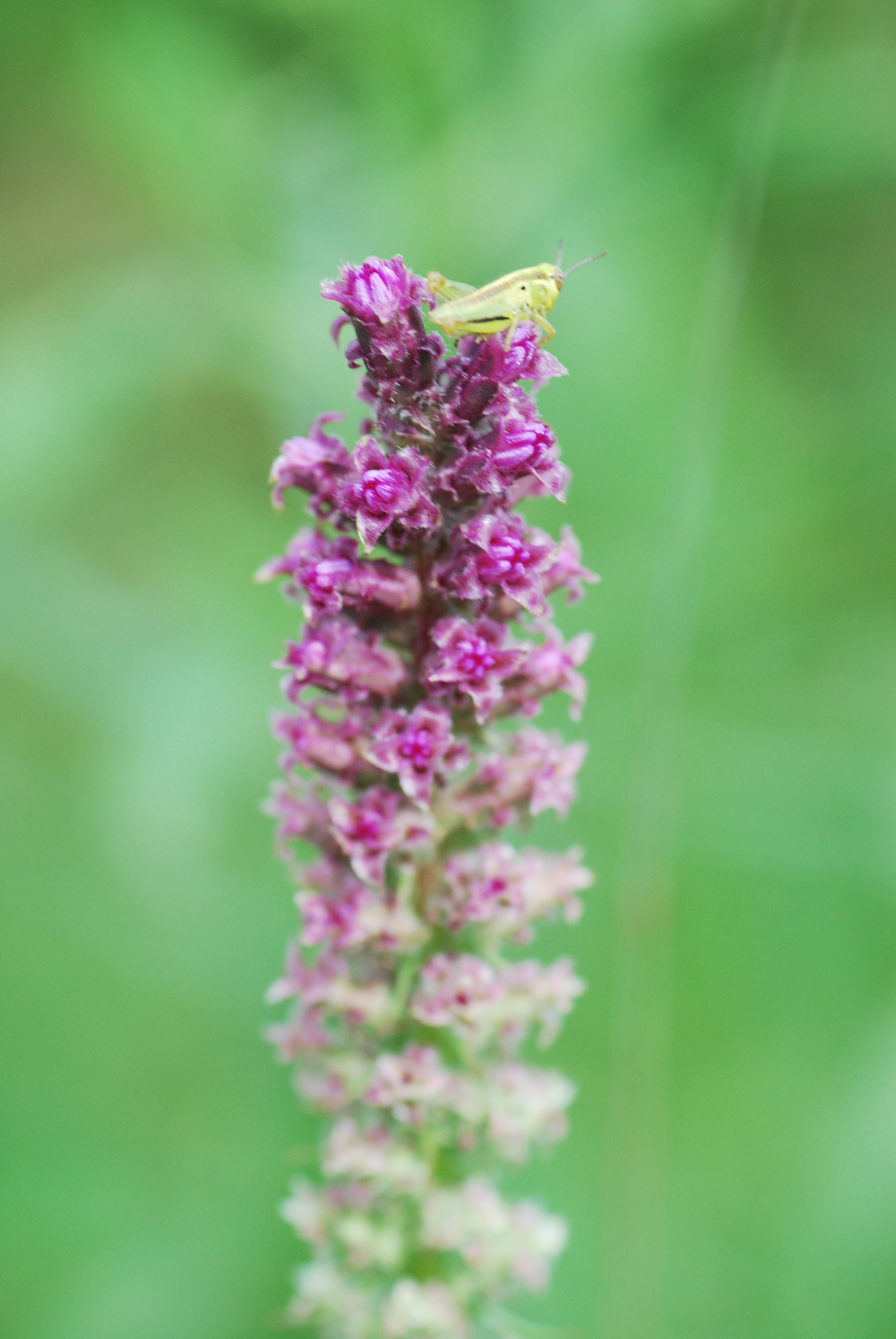
Rough Blazing Star

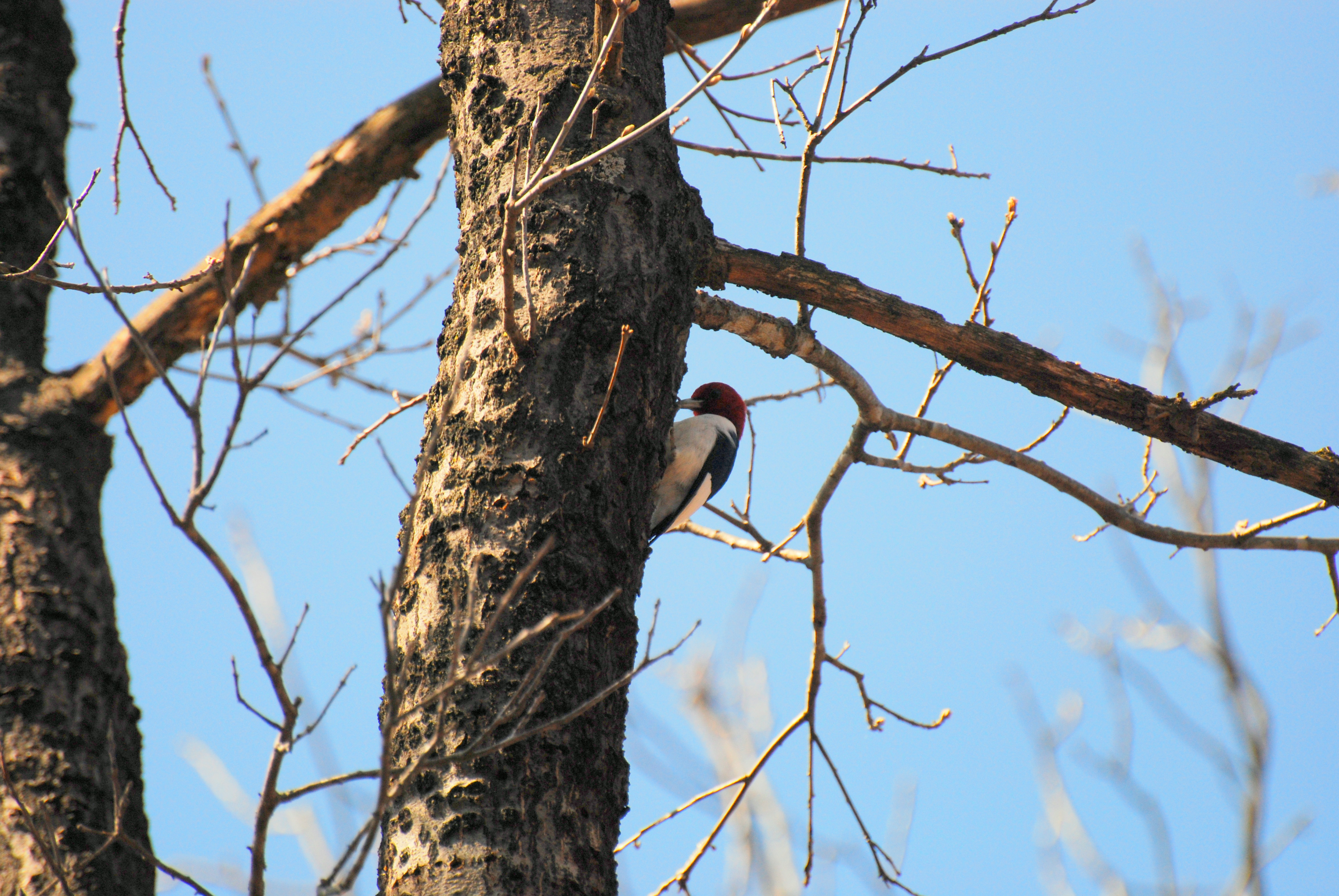
Red-headed woodpecker
