= Carboxydothermus ferrireducens =

Scientific classification
- Domain: Bacteria
- Kingdom: Bacillati
- Phylum: Bacillota
- Class: Clostridia
- Order: Carboxydothermales
- Family: Carboxydothermaceae
- Genus: Carboxydothermus
- Species: C. ferrireducens

Binomial name
- Carboxydothermus ferrireducens (Slobodkin et al. 1997) Slobodkin et al. 2006

Type strain
- DSM 11255, JW/AS-Y7, VKM B-2392

Synonyms
- Thermoterrabacterium ferrireducens

Species of bacterium

Carboxydothermus ferrireducens is a thermophilic and anaerobic bacterium from the genus Carboxydothermus.
