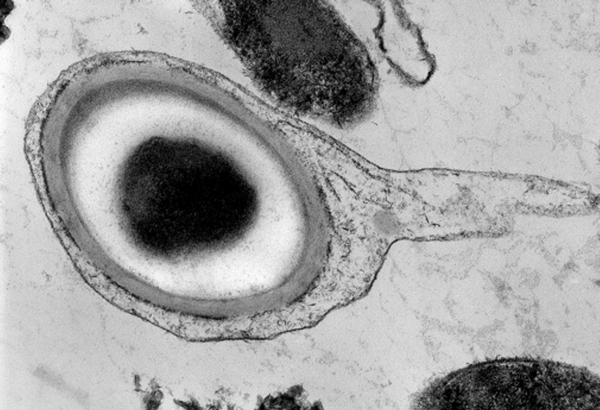
- Endospore of C. hydrogenoformans

Scientific classification
- Domain: Bacteria
- Kingdom: Bacillati
- Phylum: Bacillota
- Class: Clostridia
- Order: Carboxydothermales
- Family: Carboxydothermaceae
- Genus: Carboxydothermus
- Species: C. hydrogenoformans

Binomial name
- Carboxydothermus hydrogenoformans Svetlichny 1991

= Carboxydothermus hydrogenoformans =

Species of bacterium

Carboxydothermus hydrogenoformans is an extremely thermophilic anaerobic Gram-positive bacterium that has the interesting property of producing hydrogen as a waste product while feeding on carbon monoxide and water. It also forms endospores.

It was isolated from a hot spring on the Russian volcanic island of Kunashir by Svetlichny et al. in 1991. Its complete genome was sequenced in 2005 by a team of scientists of the Institute for Genomic Research (TIGR).

According to TIGR evolutionary biologist Jonathan Eisen, "C. hydrogenoformans is one of the fastest-growing microbes that can convert water and carbon monoxide to hydrogen." The microbe owes this to the fact that it has at least five different forms of carbon monoxide dehydrogenase.
