= Carboxydothermus siderophilus =

Scientific classification
- Domain: Bacteria
- Kingdom: Bacillati
- Phylum: Bacillota
- Class: Clostridia
- Order: Carboxydothermales
- Family: Carboxydothermaceae
- Genus: Carboxydothermus
- Species: C. siderophilus

Binomial name
- Carboxydothermus siderophilus Slepova et al. 2009

Type strain
- 1315, DSM 21278, VKM B-2474, VKPM 9905 B

Species of bacterium

Carboxydothermus siderophilus is a thermophilic and anaerobic bacterium from the genus Carboxydothermus which has been isolated from a hot spring in Kamchatka in Russia.
