= Thermosediminibacteraceae =

Scientific classification
- Domain: Bacteria
- Kingdom: Bacillati
- Phylum: Bacillota
- Class: Clostridia
- Order: Thermosediminibacterales
- Family: Thermosediminibacteraceae; Zhang et al. 2019

Genera
- Caldanaerovirga; Fervidicola; Thermosediminibacter; Thermovenabulum; Thermovorax

Family of bacteria

Thermosediminibacteraceae is a family of Gram positive bacteria in the class Clostridia.

== Phylogeny ==
The currently accepted taxonomy is based on the List of Prokaryotic names with Standing in Nomenclature (LPSN) and National Center for Biotechnology Information (NCBI).

16S rRNA based LTP_10_2024

- Thermosediminibacteraceae
  - Thermovenabulum Zavarzina et al. 2002
  - - Thermosediminibacter Lee et al. 2006
    - - Fervidicola Ogg & Patel 2009
      - - Caldanaerovirga Wagner et al. 2009
        - Thermovorax Makinen, Kaksonen & Puhakka 2012

120 marker proteins based GTDB 10-RS226

- Thermosediminibacteraceae
  - Thermovenabulum
  - - Thermosediminibacter
    - - Fervidicola
      - - Caldanaerovirga
        - Thermovorax
