= Syntrophaceticus =

Scientific classification
- Domain: Bacteria
- Kingdom: Bacillati
- Phylum: Bacillota
- Class: Syntrophomonadia
- Order: Thermacetogeniales
- Family: Thermacetogeniaceae
- Genus: Syntrophaceticus; Westerholm et al. 2011
- Species: S. schinkii

Binomial name
- Syntrophaceticus schinkii Westerholm et al. 2011

Genus of bacteria

Syntrophaceticus schinkii is a species of strictly anaerobic, mesophilic, endospore-forming, syntrophic, acetate-oxidizing bacterium. It is the type species and only species of the genus Syntrophaceticus. Its type strain is Sp3^{T} (=JCM 16669^{T}), which was isolated from an anaerobic filter treating wastewater in a fishmeal factory.
