= Thermodesulfobiaceae =

Scientific classification
- Domain: Bacteria
- Kingdom: Bacillati
- Phylum: Bacillota
- Class: Clostridia
- Order: Thermoanaerobacterales
- Family: Thermodesulfobiaceae; Mori et al. 2004

Genera
- Thermodesulfobium

Family of bacteria

The family Thermodesulfobiaceae according to the LPSN is located within the order Thermoanaerobacterales and class Clostridia. However, according to the All-Species Living Tree Project it lies outside the clade Bacillota and the genus Caldanaerovirga does not belong to the clade, i.e. Thermodesulfobiaceae is polyphyletic.

== Phylogeny ==
This family formerly included two genera (Thermodesulfobium and Coprothermobacter); however, the taxonomy of this family is under review because the genus Coprothermobacter was excluded from this family in March 2018, after several genomic analyses confirmed the differences between them. The most recent classification updates are already reported by the National Center for Biotechnology Information (NCBI), even though some taxonomy considering former versions of the List of Prokaryotic names with Standing in Nomenclature (LPSN), or old releases of 16S rRNA-based tree from The All-Species Living Tree Project, may still include it.
