= Propionispira raffinosivorans =

Scientific classification
- Domain: Bacteria
- Kingdom: Bacillati
- Phylum: Bacillota
- Class: Negativicutes
- Order: Selenomonadales
- Family: Selenomonadaceae
- Genus: Propionispira
- Species: P. raffinosivorans

Binomial name
- Propionispira raffinosivorans (Schleifer et al. 1990) Ueki et al. 2014

Synonyms
- Propionispira arboris Schink et al. 1983; Zymophilus raffinosivorans Schleifer et al. 1990

Motile, anaerobic, gram-negative bacteria

Propionispira raffinosivorans is a motile, obligate anaerobic, gram-negative bacteria. It was originally isolated from spoiled beer and believed to have some causative effect in beer spoilage. Since then, it has been taxonomically reclassified and proven to play a role in anaerobic beer spoilage, because of its production of acids, such as acetic and propionic acid, during fermentation

== Isolation and original classification as Zymophilus ==
Propionispira rafinnosivorans was first isolated as Zymophilus raffinosivorans in January 1990 by Schleifer et al., spoiled beer and pitching yeast were examined to characterize enigmatic bacterial species and their ecological significance in beer spoilage. Once collected, microbes were inoculated into a modified medium which consisted of peptone, yeast extract, meat extract, glucose, NaCl, hydrated MgSO_{4}, MnSO_{4}, a solution of KH_{2}PO_{4}, cysteine hydrochloride, and resazurin. 47 separate strains of anaerobic gram-negative bacteria were observed and recorded. A new genus, Zymophilus, was identified and separated into two distinct species, Zymophilus paucivorans and Zymophilus raffinosivorans, Zymophilus rafinosivorans was originally identified as being the type species.

== Reclassificiation and methods utilized ==
More recently, Ueki et al. 2014 reevaluated the species Z. raffinosivorans and Propionispira arboris, by comparing them to a new strain of Negativicutes, WK011^{T}, as well as the original type species, Zymophilus paucivorans. Strain WK011^{T} was isolated from residue of rice straw, which had been digested by cows and was being broken down in a methanogenic reactor, which is a bioreactor used to break down organic waste matter into methane. The anaerobic roll-tube technique was utilized in isolation of anaerobic bacteria by inoculating them into anoxygenic agar tubes. The media in the tubes was Peptone Yeast Agar containing trypticase, yeast extract, Na_{2}CO_{3}, L-cysteine hydrochloride dihydrate and sodium resazurin. Strain WK011^{T} was then sequenced and found to have a 95% genome similarity to both Z. raffinosivorans and Propionispira arboris. Based on this evidence, both species were combined into the species Propionispira raffinosivorans comb nov. The other member of its genus, Zymophilus paucivorans, was incorporated into the genus Propionispira as Propionispira paucivorans comb nov. The following type strains, or bacterial strains which exemplify the characteristics defining a genus and species, have been identified in Propionispira raffinosivorans: OW8, OW9, 0W10/1, and OWQ10/2. Strain WK011^{T} was proposed as a new species of the genus Propionispira, Propionispira arcuata sp. nov.

=== Etymology of genus and species name ===
The genus name, Propionispira, can be divided into two parts: Propioni-, coming from the Latin word Propionicum, meaning propionic acid former, and spira, coming from the Latin word -spira, meaning coil. Raffinosi- comes from the Latin word, Raffinosum, meaning raffinose and -vorans comes from the Latin word, vorare, meaning to eat or devour. This organism's full name identifies its coil-like morphology and ability to utilize raffinose as a carbon source to produce propionic acid.

=== Closely related species ===
The closest relatives are Selenomonas lactifex, Pectinatus frisingensis, Propionispira arboris, Pectinatus cerevisiiphilus, Propionispira arcuata sp. nov, and Propionispira paucivorans comb. nov, which can all be found in the class Negativicutes. This relation is based on genomic similarity as well as the ability of these organisms to stain gram-negative, even though they are found in the Gram-positive phylum of Bacillota. The main identifying characteristic which differentiates Propionispira sp. from other Negativicutes, is the presence of the cross-linked diamine, meso-diaminopimelic acid, which is covalently bonded to α-carboxyl group of D-configuration glutamic acid within peptidoglycan cell walls. This covalent bond causes the a-carboxyl group of glutamic acid to be replaced by cadaverine, which is an indicator of Propionispira sp., the presence of lipopolysaccharide in the outer membrane, specifically lipid F, is indicative of Propionispira sp. as well.

== Morphology ==
Propionispira raffinosivorans is a motile, non-spore forming, Gram-negative bacterium. Although, repeated subculturing has been able to cause a loss of motility in this organism. Its cell shape is a curved, helical rod which can be found alone, paired, or in groups. Cell size can range from a length of 1.0–2.3 μm and a width of 0.3–0.5 μm. When plated on MRS agar, or De Man; Rogosa; and Sharpe agar, P. paucivorans produces smooth and circular colonies, which contain a yellow tint and range from 1-2mm in diameter.

== Metabolism and physiology ==
Propionispira raffinosivorans is classified as an obligate anaerobic chemoorganotroph, but its specific electron acceptors and donors have remained elusive. P. raffinosivorans can ferment glucose, cellobiose, maltose, fructose, mannitol, mannose, ribose, sucrose, and arabinose to produce acid. It produces propionic acid, carbon dioxide, and acetic acid as products of its fermentative metabolic pathway. It does not produce acid when fermenting amygdalin, glycogen, erythritol, dulcitol, inositol, inulin, starch, melezitose, melibiose, trehalose, raffinose, and xylose. The KEGG database shows that P. raffinosivorans has genes encoding for oxidative phosphorylation, glycolysis, photosynthesis, nitrogen fixation, and carbon fixation, allowing it to use a variety of substrates for energy. P. raffinosivorans has an optimum growth temperature of 30°C and is able to survive concentrations of ethanol around or below 5%. Also, it can grow at pH levels at or greater than 4.3 The ecological significance of this organism has only been researched in the context of beer spoilage and its appearance has been noted in a bioreactor containing cow feces, pitching yeast, and anaerobic beer packaging.

== Genome ==
The genome of P. raffinosivorans DSM 20765 is the only strain of this species to be completely sequenced using Illumina HiSeq 2000 technology by the DOE's Joint Genome Institute on April 24, 2013, allowing quantification of genome length at 4.13 Megabp. The Whole Genome Shotgun Sequencing method aided in sequence identification, developed by Staden et al. 1979, in which DNA was fragmented randomly and amplified to produce overlap between short sequences of DNA, which were then used in primary assembly. Primary genome assembly, known as scaffold level assembly, provided a rough map of DNA sequence orientation and location, but is still incomplete with a total gap of 2,843 bps in the DNA that have yet to be correctly inserted and oriented for chromosomal reconstruction. Assembly of the genome was attempted using the windows program Velvet 1.1.04, created by Zerbino et al. 2008, in conjunction with the program ALLPATHS v. R37654, providing an accurate reconstruction of 99.9994% of the draft genome. The genome G-C content was identified to be 38.1% and the assembled genome was shown to code for 3,772 proteins, with the 30S ribosomal protein S2 being used as a non-redundant protein reference for taxonomic placement.

== Ecology ==
The habitat range of P. raffinosivorans is yet unknown but has been predicted to be fairly ubiquitous in breweries with species identifications in Germany, the Czech Republic, Scandinavia, and Japan. Both P. raffinosivorans and P. paucivorans strains are known to have a habitat connected exclusively to breweries. Strains of P. raffinosivorans have been identified from brewing related sources including pitching yeast, spoiled beer, and brewery wastes. 10 strains were identified in pitching yeast and 4 strains in brewery waste by Schleifer et al. in 1990 using 16SrRNA sequencing via reverse transcriptase, a Biosearch Cyclone DNA synthesizer to design primers complementary to conserved 16SrRNA sequences, and terminal transferase. DNA hybridization, via conserved sequences targeted by DNA probes, was then used in conjunction with 16SrRNA sequencing to determine evolutionary distances between 47 organisms isolated from the same sources and to create an unrooted phylogenetic tree.

Hops have been shown to have antimicrobial effects, due to Iso-alpha acids, against gram-positive organisms, which are resisted by pseudo-gram-positive organisms like those in the class Negativicutes, such as P. raffinosivorans. The effects of hops and the production of acids by P. raffinosivorans, as well as increasing ethanol concentrations due to fermentation by yeast, contribute to decreased competition by fastidious bacterial species, in the volatile environment of packaged beer. These same acids, produced by P. raffinosivorans, which decrease the pH of packaged beer and limit competition, also cause the off-flavour and spoilage of beer.

== Importance ==
Propionispira raffinosivorans has been considered a potential spoiler of beer since it was first isolated, but it was not until 2008 that evidence for this theory was apparent. The advancement of beer bottling techniques, aimed at decreasing the oxygen content of beer to prevent spoilage, was shown to correlate with an increase in obligate anaerobic bacterial contamination. This technology was specifically aimed at reducing Lactobacillus sp., which account for nearly 70% of beer spoilage, but had unintended effects because it increased the prevalence of anaerobic spoilage bacteria in beer. P. raffinosivorans produces acetic acid as one of its major by-products of fermentation, which can increase the flavor of beer to a certain degree but will quickly produce inimical effects at higher concentrations. This shows that P. raffinosivorans can produce enough acid to spoil beer, even though few fermentable sugars are available in packaged beer, which has created interest in further study of its metabolic pathways. Because of these reasons, the brewing industry has shown an increased interest in the factors that prevent the growth of beer spoilage organisms, to increase the shelf life of their products and minimize financial losses.
