= Thiophilus =

Thiophilus may refer to:

- Ammonifex thiophilus, species of bacteria
- Geovibrio thiophilus, species of bacteria

== See also ==
- Theophilus
