= Thermacetogenium =

Scientific classification
- Domain: Bacteria
- Kingdom: Bacillati
- Phylum: Bacillota
- Class: Syntrophomonadia
- Order: Thermacetogeniales
- Family: Thermacetogeniaceae
- Genus: Thermacetogenium; Hattori et al. 2000
- Species: T. phaeum

Binomial name
- Thermacetogenium phaeum Hattori et al. 2000

Genus of bacteria

Thermacetogenium phaeum is a species of bacterium. It is the type species and only species of the genus Thermacetogenium. It is strictly anaerobic, thermophilic, syntrophic and acetate-oxidizing. Its cells are gram-positive, endospore-forming and rod-shaped. Its type strain is PBT (= DSM 12270T). It has a potential biotechnological role.
