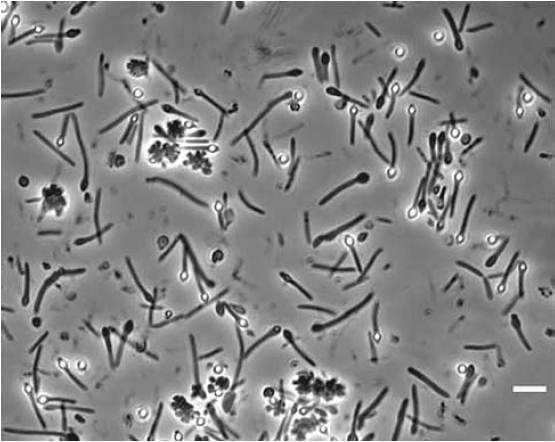
- Moorella thermoacetica

Scientific classification
- Domain: Bacteria
- Phylum: Bacillota
- Class: Clostridia
- Order: Moorellales
- Family: Moorellaceae
- Genus: Moorella Collins et al. 1994 non Rao & Rao 1964

Type species
- Moorella thermoacetica (Fontaine et al. 1942) Collins et al. 1994

Species
- Moorella caeni; Moorella carbonis; Moorella glycerini; Moorella humiferrea; Moorella mulderi; "Moorella perchloratireducens"; Moorella stamsii; Moorella sulfitireducens; Moorella thermoacetica; Moorella thermoautotrophica

Synonyms
- Neomoorella Gtari & Ventura 2025

= Moorella (bacterium) =

Genus of bacteria

Moorella is a genus of bacteria belonging to the phylum Bacillota.

These bacteria are thermophilic, anaerobic and endospore-forming and many species of this genus have been isolated from hot springs. Some of these species were formerly included within the genus Clostridium, but after a taxonomic rearrangement of the class Clostridia, a phylogenetically distinct genus was identified, which was named Moorella in honor of the American microbiologist W.E.C. Moore.

== Phylogeny ==
The currently accepted taxonomy is based on the List of Prokaryotic names with Standing in Nomenclature (LPSN) and National Center for Biotechnology Information (NCBI).

16S rRNA based LTP_10_2024

- Moorella
  - - M. caeni Santaella, Sousa & Stams 2023
    - M. thermoacetica (Fontaine et al. 1942) Collins et al. 1994
  - - - M. glycerini Slobodkin et al. 1997
      - M. mulderi Balk et al. 2005
    - - M. stamsii Alves et al. 2013
      - - M. humiferrea Nepomnyashchaya et al. 2012
        - M. sulfitireducens Slobodkina et al. 2023

120 marker proteins based GTDB 10-RS226

- Moorella
  - M. thermoacetica [incl. M. thermoautotrophica]
  - - - M. humiferrea
      - M. sulfitireducens
    - - M. glycerini
      - - M. mulderi
        - M. stamsii
