= Carboxydothermus =

Scientific classification
- Domain: Bacteria
- Kingdom: Bacillati
- Phylum: Bacillota
- Class: Clostridia
- Order: Carboxydothermales
- Family: Carboxydothermaceae
- Genus: Carboxydothermus; Svetlichny et al. 1991

Type species
- Carboxydothermus hydrogenoformans Svetlichny et al. 1991

Species
- C. ferrireducens; C. hydrogenoformans; C. islandicus; C. pertinax; C. siderophilus

Synonyms
- Thermoterrabacterium Slobodkin et al. 1997

Genus of bacteria

Carboxydothermus is a genus of thermophilic, anaerobic bacteria from the family Thermoanaerobacteraceae.

== Phylogeny ==
The currently accepted taxonomy is based on the List of Prokaryotic names with Standing in Nomenclature (LPSN) and National Center for Biotechnology Information (NCBI).

16S rRNA based LTP_10_2024

- Carboxydothermus
  - C. pertinax Yoneda et al. 2012
  - - C. hydrogenoformans Svetlichny et al. 1991
    - - C. siderophilus Slepova et al. 2009
      - - C. ferrireducens (Slobodkin et al. 1997) Slobodkin et al. 2006
        - C. islandicus Novikov et al. 2011

120 marker proteins based GTDB 10-RS226

- Carboxydothermus
  - C. pertinax
  - - C. hydrogenoformans [incl. C. ferrireducens]
    - C. islandicus
