= Caldanaerovirga =

Scientific classification
- Domain: Bacteria
- Kingdom: Bacillati
- Phylum: Bacillota
- Class: Clostridia
- Order: Thermosediminibacterales
- Family: Thermosediminibacteraceae
- Genus: Caldanaerovirga; Wagner et al. 2009

Type species
- Caldanaerovirga acetigignens Wagner et al. 2009

Species
- C. acetigignens

Genus of bacteria

Caldanaerovirga is a xylanolytic, anaerobic and alkalithermophilic genus of bacteria from the family of Thermosediminibacterales with one known species (Caldanaerovirga acetigignens).

== See also ==
- List of Bacteria genera
- List of bacterial orders
