= Mahella =

Scientific classification
- Domain: Bacteria
- Kingdom: Bacillati
- Phylum: Bacillota
- Class: Clostridia
- Order: Thermoanaerobacterales
- Family: Mahellaceae; Chuvochina et al. 2024
- Genus: Mahella; Bonilla Salinas et al. 2004
- Species: M. australiensis

Binomial name
- Mahella australiensis Bonilla Salinas et al. 2004

Genus of bacteria

Mahella is a genus in the phylum Bacillota (Bacteria). The name Mahella derives from: Neo-Latin feminine gender dim. noun Mahella, named in honour of the American microbiologist Professor R.A. Mah, for his important contribution to the taxonomy of anaerobes.

== Species ==
The genus contains a single species, Mahella australiensis; Neo-Latin feminine gender adjective australiensis, related to Australia.)
