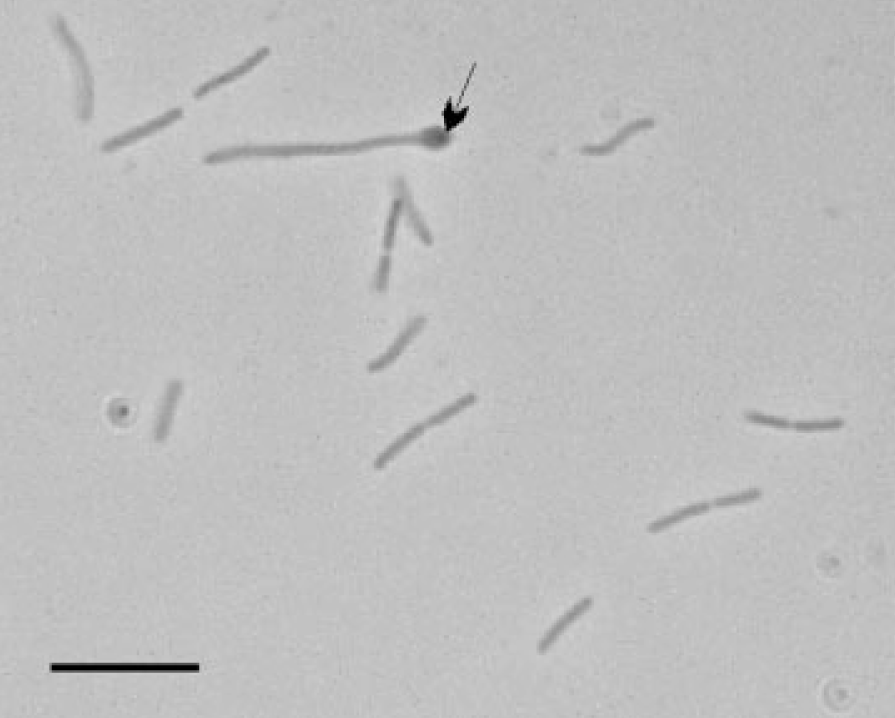

Scientific classification
- Domain: Bacteria
- Kingdom: Bacillati
- Phylum: Bacillota
- Class: Clostridia
- Order: Thermoanaerobacterales
- Family: Thermoanaerobacteraceae
- Genus: Gelria; Plugge et al. 2002

Type species
- Gelria glutamica Plugge et al. 2002

Species
- Gelria glutamica

= Gelria (bacterium) =

Genus of bacteria

Gelria is a thermophilic, anaerobic, obligately syntrophic, glutamate-degrading, endospore-forming bacterial genus in the family Thermoanaerobacteraceae.

The name of the genus comes from Gelre (present province of Gelderland), one of the 12 provinces in The Netherlands.

== See also ==
- List of bacterial genera named after geographical names
- List of bacterial orders
- List of bacteria genera
