= Thomas D. Brock =

American microbiologist (1926–2021)

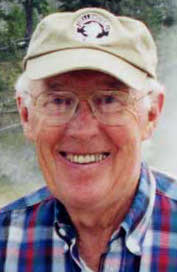
- July 2002, Yellowstone Park
- Born: September 10, 1926; Cleveland, Ohio, U.S.
- Died: April 4, 2021 (aged 94); Madison, Wisconsin, U.S.
- Education: Ohio State University
- Known for: Thermophilic bacteria Thermus aquaticus
- Awards: Golden Goose Award (2013)
- Scientific career
- Fields: Microbiology
- Workplaces: The Upjohn Company; Case Western Reserve University; Indiana University; University of Wisconsin–Madison
- Thesis: Studies on the metabolism of the yeast, Hansenula anomala (Hansen) Sydow (1952)
- Doctoral advisor: William D. Gray

Thomas Dale Brock (September 10, 1926 – April 4, 2021) was an American microbiologist known for his discovery of hyperthermophiles living in hot springs at Yellowstone National Park. In the late 1960s, Brock discovered high-temperature bacteria living in the Great Fountain region of Yellowstone, and with his colleague Hudson H. Freeze, they isolated a sample which they named Thermus aquaticus, from which the DNA-synthesizing enyzme Taq polymerase was later isolated.

"Life at High Temperatures", a 1967 article summarizing his research, was published in the journal Science and led to the study of extremophiles, organisms that live in extreme environments. By 1976, T. aquaticus was found useful for artificially amplifying DNA segments. Brock's discoveries led to great progress in biology, contributed to new developments in medicine and agriculture, and helped create the new field of biotechnology.

== Early life ==
Thomas Dale Brock was born in Cleveland, Ohio, on September 10, 1926, the only child of Helen Sophia Ringwald, of Chillicothe, Ohio, and Thomas Carter Brock, of Toronto, Ontario, Canada. Though Cleveland was an industrial city, his home was situated near a farm and forested park with views of Lake Erie, so that he grew up in an "idyllic environment", surrounded by nature.

Brock's father, who had never received a formal education, had encouraged Brock to pursue university, and taught Brock how to assemble electrical equipment. At the age of 10, Brock received a chemistry set as a Christmas present, and his father helped him set up a basement laboratory. When Brock was 15, his father became seriously ill, and the family moved back to his mother's home in Ohio. Months later, Brock's father died, leaving the family in a state of poverty. Brock immediately went to work for $0.25 per hour to support himself and his mother in various odd jobs.

Although Brock had decided to attend college and become a chemist, World War II was in progress. After graduating from high school, Brock joined the United States Navy and spent more than a year in their electronics program.

Under the G.I. Bill, Brock began attending Ohio State University in 1946, initially with aspirations of becoming a writer, yet still drawn to chemistry and science. He earned a B.Sc. (1949), M.Sc. (1950), and Ph.D. (1952) in botany, specializing in experimental mycology and yeast physiology. His graduate work centered on the mushroom Morchella esculenta and the yeast Hansenula anomala.

== Career ==
After completing his Ph.D., Brock took a position in the antibiotics research department at the Upjohn Company in Kalamazoo, Michigan, where out of necessity he became self-taught in microbiology and molecular biology. By the time he left Upjohn, he had published six papers in respectable journals and become a member of the Society of American Bacteriologists. In 1957, Brock joined the faculty of the Department of Biology at Western Reserve University. In 1960, he accepted the position of assistant professor of bacteriology at Indiana University, where he was promoted to full professorship in 1964. He moved to the University of Wisconsin–Madison in 1971 and became chairman of the Department of Bacteriology in 1979.

Bacteria are able to grow ... at any temperature at which there is liquid water, even in pools which are above the boiling point.

— Thomas D. Brock, 1967

From 1965 through 1975, Brock conducted field and laboratory research on thermophilic microorganisms in Yellowstone National Park, funded by a grant from the National Science Foundation. From a sample of pink bacteria collected from Mushroom Spring, Brock and undergraduate student Hudson H. Freeze isolated an organism thriving at 70 °C (160 °F) which they named Thermus aquaticus. The ability of an enzyme (DNA polymerase) from T. aquaticus to tolerate high temperatures would, 20 years later, make possible the invention of a procedure called polymerase chain reaction. PCR utilizes an enzyme from T. aquaticus, now known as Taq polymerase, to make multiple copies of a part of a DNA molecule. PCR can also be used to introduce specifically chosen mutations into DNA, and for numerous other ways of manipulating or analyzing DNA. Kary Mullis, jointly with Michael Smith, who had invented another essential method of manipulating DNA, was awarded a Nobel Prize in chemistry.

In 1970 Brock wrote a college textbook Biology of Microorganisms, and published 7 editions alone or with co-authors. A previous co-author, Michael Madigan, then took over as lead author with changing author teams, and the book was renamed Brock Biology of Microorganisms. The latest edition is the sixteenth from 2021. The text is widely used for college microbiology courses for students majoring in a biological science.

In 1998, Brock helped update and contribute to a new version of René Dubos' 1960 book, Pasteur and Modern Science. In 1999, he translated and edited Milestones in Microbiology 1546 to 1940, a collection of the most important papers in early microbiology, including work by Antonie van Leeuwenhoek, Louis Pasteur, Robert Koch, and Joseph Lister. Also released in the same year was Brock's Robert Koch: A Life in Medicine and Bacteriology, a biography of German physician Robert Koch.

Brock held the E.B. Fred Professor of Natural Sciences Emeritus at the University of Wisconsin–Madison. During his career, Brock published more than 250 papers and 20 books, and received numerous science and education awards.

The thermophilic bacterial species, Thermoanaerobacter brockii, is named after Brock. The novel archaeal phylum Brockarchaeota is also named after Brock.

Brock was a resident of Shorewood Hills, a village adjacent to Madison, for many years and he published the book, Shorewood Hills - An Illustrated History, in 1999.

== Pleasant Valley Conservancy ==
Brock and his wife, Kathie, operated Pleasant Valley Conservancy State Natural Area, a 140-acre (57 ha) preserve in western Dane County, Wisconsin. It consists of extensive restored oak savannas, dry, mesic, and wet prairies, wetlands, and oak woods. There are scenic views and wildlife viewing, and several trails provide ready access to the Preserve. Especially noteworthy at Pleasant Valley are the fine oak savannas, once common in the Midwest but now very rare. The Preserve has many large open-grown white and bur oaks, which can be viewed from Pleasant Valley Road, and seen close up from the trails. The herbaceous layer in the savanna is highly diverse.

== Death ==
Brock died from a fall at his home in Madison, Wisconsin on April 4, 2021, aged 94.

== Awards ==
- 1984 Fisher Award in Applied and Environmental Microbiology (American Society for Microbiology)
- 1988 Carski Foundation Distinguished Teaching Award (American Society for Microbiology)
- 1992 Honorary Member (American Society for Microbiology)
- 1992 Pasteur Medal (Illinois Society for Microbiology)
- 1996 Bergey's Medal (Bergey's Trust)
- 2003 Waksman Award (Society for Industrial Microbiology)
- 2006 Aldo Leopold Award for Excellence in Ecological Restoration Practices (University of Wisconsin-Arboretum)
- 2013 Golden Goose Award for discovery of Thermus aquaticus
- 2015 Joseph Sullivant Medal, Ohio State University
- 2019 University of Wisconsin-Madison Honorary Doctorate

== Selected works ==
- Brock, Thomas D. (1994). Life at High Temperatures. Yellowstone National Park: Yellowstone Association for Natural Science, History & Education, Inc.
- Brock, Thomas D. (1978). Thermophilic Microorganisms and Life at High Temperatures. Springer-Verlag. ISBN 0-387-90309-7.
- Brock, Thomas D.; Kelly, Michael T. (October 1969). "Molecular Heterogeneity of Isolates of the Marine Bacterium Leucothrix mucor". Journal of Bacteriology. 100 (1). American Society for Microbiology: 14–21. doi:10.1128/JB.100.1.14-21.1969. PMC 315351. PMID 5344093.
- Brock, Thomas D.; Hudson Freeze (August 1969). "Thermus aquaticus gen. n. and sp. n., a nonsporulating extreme thermophile". Journal of Bacteriology. 98 (1). American Society for Microbiology: 289–297. doi:10.1128/jb.98.1.289-297.1969. PMC 249935. PMID 5781580.
- Brock, Thomas D. (May 15, 1964). "Knots in Leucothrix mucor". Science. 144 (3620): 870–872. Bibcode:1964Sci...144..870B. doi:10.1126/science.144.3620.870. PMID 14149405. S2CID 28597803.
- "Thomas D. Brock: Publication List".
