= Wood betony =

Wood betony is the common name for several plants and may refer to:

- Pedicularis canadensis in the family Orobanchaceae
- Betonica officinalis, formerly known as Stachys officinalis, in the family Lamiaceae
