= Thermanaeromonas =

Scientific classification
- Domain: Bacteria
- Kingdom: Bacillati
- Phylum: Bacillota
- Class: Clostridia
- Order: Desulfitibacterales
- Family: Neomoorellaceae
- Genus: Thermanaeromonas; Mori et al. 2002

Type species
- Thermanaeromonas toyohensis Mori et al. 2002

Species
- T. burensis; T. toyohensis

Genus of bacteria

Thermanaeromonas is a genus of bacteria within the family Neomoorellaceae. The type species of this genus is Thermanaeromonas toyohensis, a highly thermophilic anaerobe.

== Phylogeny ==
The currently accepted taxonomy is based on the List of Prokaryotic names with Standing in Nomenclature (LPSN) and National Center for Biotechnology Information (NCBI).

16S rRNA based LTP_10_2024

- Thermanaeromonas
  - T. burensis Ben Ali Gam et al. 2016
  - T. toyohensis Mori et al. 2002

120 marker proteins based GTDB 10-RS226

- Thermanaeromonas
  T. toyohensis

== See also ==
- List of bacterial orders
- List of bacteria genera
