= Tepidanaerobacteraceae =

Scientific classification
- Domain: Bacteria
- Kingdom: Bacillati
- Phylum: Bacillota
- Class: Clostridia
- Order: Thermosediminibacterales
- Family: Tepidanaerobacteraceae; Zhang et al. 2019

Genera
- Biomaibacter; Tepidanaerobacter; Thermorhabdus

Family of bacteria

Tepidanaerobacteraceae is a family of Gram positive bacteria in the class Clostridia.

== Phylogeny ==
The currently accepted taxonomy is based on the List of Prokaryotic names with Standing in Nomenclature (LPSN) and National Center for Biotechnology Information (NCBI).

16S rRNA based LTP_10_2024

- Tepidanaerobacteraceae
  - Biomaibacter
  - Tepidanaerobacter

120 marker proteins based GTDB 10-RS226

- Tepidanaerobacteraceae
  - Biomaibacter Zhang et al. 2019
  - Tepidanaerobacter Sekiguchi et al. 2006
