= Thermosediminibacterales =

Scientific classification
- Domain: Bacteria
- Kingdom: Bacillati
- Phylum: Bacillota
- Class: Clostridia
- Order: Thermosediminibacterales; Zhang et al. 2019

Families
- Tepidanaerobacteraceae; Thermosediminibacteraceae

Order of bacteria

Thermosediminibacterales is an order of Gram positive bacteria in the class Clostridia.

== See also ==
- List of Bacteria genera
- List of bacterial orders
