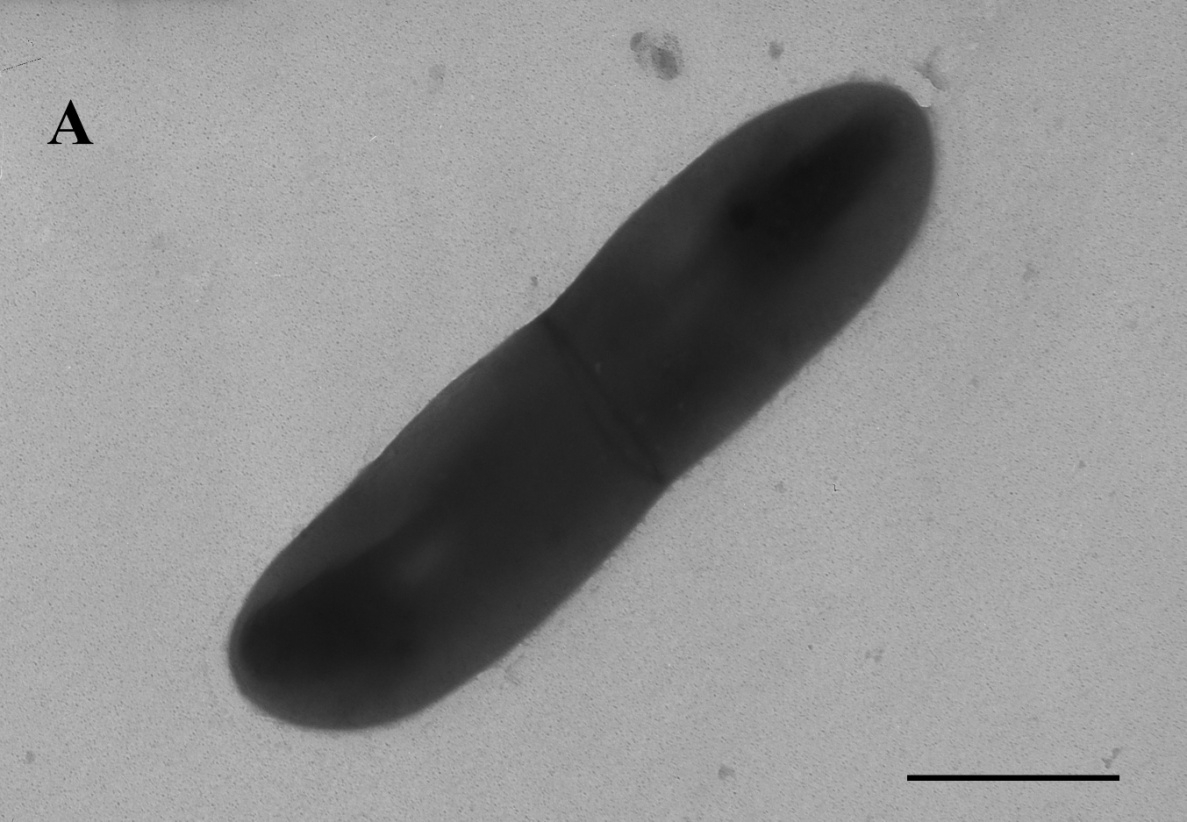
- Aceticella autotrophica

Scientific classification
- Domain: Bacteria
- Kingdom: Bacillati
- Phylum: Bacillota
- Class: Clostridia
- Order: Thermoanaerobacterales; Wiegel 2010

Groups included
- Caldanaerobiaceae; "Calorimonadaceae"; Thermoanaerobacteraceae; Zhaonellaceae

Cladistically included but traditionally excluded taxa
- Acetivibrionales; Bacilli; Caldicoprobacterales; Christensenellales; Clostridiales; Culicoidibacteria; Erysipelotrichia; Eubacteriales; Lachnospirales; Limnochordia; Lutisporales; Mahellales; Monoglobales; Negativicutes; "Oscillospirales"; Peptostreptococcales; "Saccharofermentanales"; Syntrophomonadia; Thermaerobacteria; Thermolithobacteria; Tissierellales; "Ca. Borkfalkiales"; "Ca. Avidehalobacter"; Caecibacterium; Caldinitratiruptor; Capillibacterium; "Ca. Carbonibacillus"; "Ca. Desulfobacillus"; "Ca. Ferrisolea"; "Ca. Heliomonas"; Negativibacillus

Synonyms
- "Caldanaerobiales"

= Thermoanaerobacterales =

Order of bacteria

The Thermoanaerobacterales is a polyphyletic order of bacteria placed within the polyphyletic class Clostridia, and encompassing four families: the Thermoanaerobacteraceae, the Thermodesulfobiaceae, the Thermoanaerobacterales Family III. Incertae Sedis, and the Thermoanaerobacterales Family IV. Incertae Sedis, and various unplaced genera.

This order is noted for the species' abilities to survive in extreme environments without oxygen and of relatively elevated temperatures for a living being (up to 80-90 °C). An example organism in this order is Thermoanaerobacter ethanolicus.

== Taxonomy ==
The Thermoanaerobacterales, as previously mentioned, is polyphyletic, and consists of numerous morphologically similar clades:

LPSN and National Center for Biotechnology Information (NCBI).	16S rRNA based LTP_10_2024 & 120 marker proteins based GTDB 09-RS220
Thermoanaerobacteraceae; Ammonifex; Caldanaerobacter; Caldanaerobius; Caldanaerovirga; Calderihabitans; Caloribacterium; Calorimonas; Carboxydothermus; Desulfothermobacter; Desulfovirgula; Fervidicola; Gelria; Moorella; Tepidanaerobacter; Thermacetogenium; Thermanaeromonas; Thermoanaerobacter; Thermodesulfitimonas; Thermosediminibacter; Thermovenabulum; Thermovorax; Zhaonella; Thermodesulfobiaceae; Thermodesulfobium; Thermoanaerobacterales Family III; Anaerocellum; Caldicellulosiruptor; Syntrophaceticus; Thermoanaerobacterium; Mahellaceae; Mahella	"Desulfovirgulaceae"; Desulfovirgula Kaksonen et al. 2007; "Ammonificales"; "Ammonificaceae"; Ammonifex Huber & Stetter 1996; Desulfothermobacter Frolov et al. 2018; Thermodesulfitimonas Slobodkina et al. 2017; "Carboxydothermales"; "Carboxydothermaceae"; Carboxydothermus Svetlichny et al. 1991; "Mahellales"; "Mahellaceae"; Mahella Bonilla Salinas et al. 2004; Moorellales Lv et al. 2020; Calderihabitantaceae Lv et al. 2020; Calderihabitans Yoneda et al. 2013; Desulfitibacteraceae Lv et al. 2020; Desulfitibacter Nielsen, Kjeldsen & Ingvorsen 2006; Moorellaceae Lv et al. 2020; Moorella Collins et al. 1994 non Rao & Rao 1964; Thermanaeromonas Mori et al. 2002; "Thermacetogeniaceae"; Syntrophaceticus Westerholm, Roos & Schnurer 2011; Thermacetogenium Hattori et al. 2000; "Caldicellulosiruptorales" Bing et al. 2023; "Caldicellulosiruptoraceae" Bing et al. 2023; Caldicellulosiruptor Sissons et al. 1987; Thermoanaerobacterales Wiegel 2010; "Caldanaerobiaceae"; Caldanaerobius Lee et al. 2008; Caloribacterium Slobodkina et al. 2012; "Calorimonadaceae"; Calorimonas Khomyakova et al. 2020; Thermoanaerobacteraceae Wiegel 2010; Caldanaerobacter Fardeau et al. 2004; Thermoanaerobacter Wiegel & Ljungdahl 1982; Thermoanaerobacterium Lee et al. 1993; Zhaonellaceae Lv et al. 2020; Zhaonella Lv et al. 2020; "Thermodesulfobiales" Cavalier-Smith 2020; Thermodesulfobiaceae Morie et al. 2004; Thermodesulfobium Morie et al. 2004; Thermosediminibacterales Zhang et al. 2019; Tepidanaerobacteraceae Zhang et al. 2019; Biomaibacter Zhang et al. 2019; Tepidanaerobacter Sekiguchi et al. 2006; Thermosediminibacteraceae Zhang et al. 2019; Fervidicola Ogg & Patel 2009; Caldanaerovirga Wagner et al. 2009; Thermosediminibacter Lee et al. 2006; Thermovenabulum Zavarzina et al. 2002; Thermovorax Makinen, Kaksonen & Puhakka 2012

== Phylogeny ==
16S rRNA based LTP_10_2024

- - - Koleobacterales
    - - Caldicellulosiruptorales *
        - Caldicellulosiruptoraceae
          Caldicellulosiruptor
      - "Caldanaerobiales" *
        - - Caldanaerobiaceae
            Caldanaerobius
        - - - "Calorimonadaceae"
              - Aceticella
              - - Caloribacterium
                - Calorimonas
          - Thermoanaerobacterium * [incl. Thermohydrogenium]
  - - - Carboxydothermales *
        - Carboxydothermaceae
          Carboxydothermus
      - Thermacetogeniales *
        - Thermacetogeniaceae
          - Syntrophaceticus
          - Thermacetogenium
    - - - - Ammonificales *
            - Desulfovirgulaceae
              Desulfovirgula
            - Ammonificaceae
              - Thermodesulfitimonas
              - - Desulfothermobacter
                - Ammonifex
        - - "Brockiales"
          - - Dictyoglomales
            - - Thermosediminibacterales *
                - Tepidanaerobacteraceae
                  - Biomaibacter
                  - Tepidanaerobacter
                - Thermosediminibacteraceae
                  - Thermovenabulum
                  - - Thermosediminibacter
                    - - Fervidicola
                      - - Caldanaerovirga
                        - Thermovorax
      - - Thermoanaerobacterales *
          - Thermoanaerobacteraceae
            - Thermanaeromonas
            - - Caldanaerobacter
              - Thermoanaerobacter

- - - Desulfitibacterales *
      - Desulfitibacteraceae
        Desulfitibacter
    - Desulfitisporales
      - Desulfitisporaceae
        Desulfitispora
  - - - Calderihabitantales *
        - Calderihabitantaceae
          Calderihabitans
      - Moorellales *
        - Moorellaceae
          Moorella
    - - - Zhaonellaceae *
          Zhaonella
      - Syntrophomonadales

120 marker proteins based GTDB 10-RS226

- - Peptococcia
  - - - - DSM‑12270 *
          - Thermacetogeniales
            - Thermacetogeniaceae
              - Syntrophaceticus
              - Thermacetogenium
        - Syntrophomonadia
          Syntrophomonadales
      - - - - - DSM‑16504 *
                - Desulfitibacterales
                  - Desulfitibacteraceae
                    Desulfitibacter
            - - KKC1 *
                - Calderihabitantales
                  - Calderihabitantaceae
                    Calderihabitans
              - JADQBR01 *
                - JADQBR01
                  - JADQBR01
                    "Metallumcola"
          - - DULZ01 *
              - DULZ01
                - Zhaonellaceae
                  Zhaonella
            - "Moorellia" *
              - Neomoorellales
                - Neomoorellaceae
                  - Thermanaeromonas
                  - Neomoorella
        - "Dehalobacteriia"
    - - Desulfitobacteriia
      - - - "Carboxydocellia"
            Carboxydocellales
          - Thermincolia
            Thermincolales
        - - "Carboxydothermia" *
            - Carboxydothermales
              - Carboxydothermaceae
                Carboxydothermus
          - Desulfotomaculia
            - - Ammonificales *
                - "Desulforudaceae"
                  - "Ca. Desulfopertinax
                  - "Ca. Desulforudis
                - Ammonificaceae
                  - Thermodesulfitimonas
                  - Ammonifex
            - Desulfotomaculales

- - - "Thermosediminibacteria"
      - Koleobacterales
      - - Thermosediminibacterales *
          - Tepidanaerobacteraceae
            - Biomaibacter
            - Tepidanaerobacter
          - Thermosediminibacteraceae
            - Thermovenabulum
            - - Thermosediminibacter
              - - Fervidicola
                - - Caldanaerovirga
                  - Thermovorax
  - - - "Thermoanaerobacteria" *
        - Caldicellulosiruptorales
          - Caldicellulosiruptoraceae
            Caldicellulosiruptor
        - Thermoanaerobacterales
          - - "Calorimonadaceae"
              Calorimonas
            - Caldanaerobiaceae
              Caldanaerobius
          - - Thermoanaerobacteraceae
              - - Aceticella
                - Thermoanaerobacterium
              - Thermoanaerobacter
                (incl. Caldanaerobacter)
    - "Clostridiia" s.s.

Note:

- polyphyletic Thermoanaerobacterales

== See also ==
- List of Bacteria genera
- List of bacterial orders
