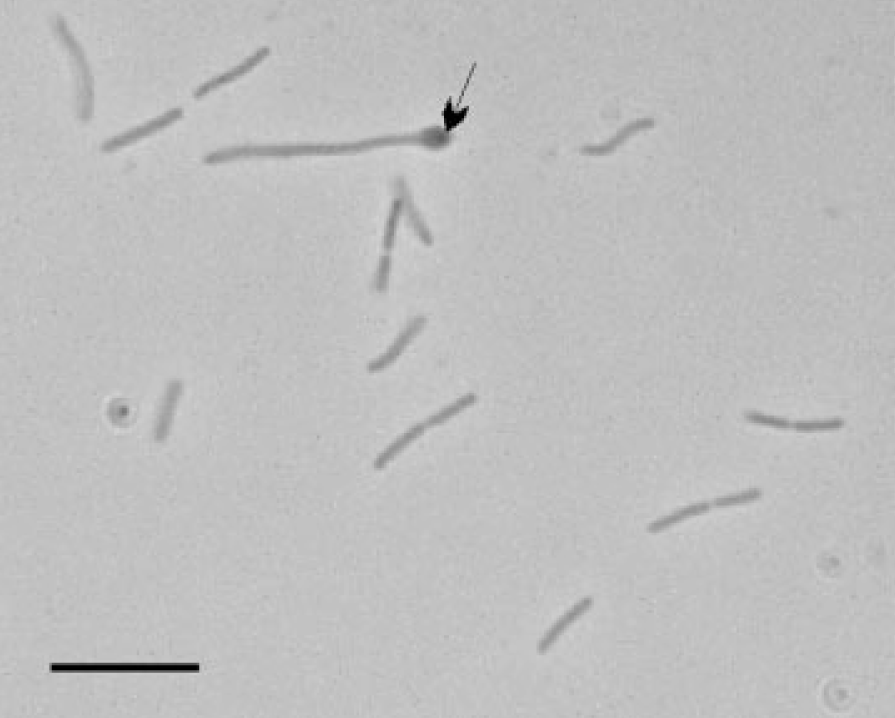
- Gelria

Scientific classification
- Domain: Bacteria
- Kingdom: Bacillati
- Phylum: Bacillota
- Class: Clostridia
- Order: Thermoanaerobacterales
- Family: Thermoanaerobacteraceae; Wiegel 2010

Genera
- Aceticella; Brockia; Caldanaerobacter; Caldanaerobius; Calderihabitans; Caloribacterium; Carboxydibrachium; Carboxydothermus; Desulfothermobacter; Desulfovirgula; Gelria; Thermoanaerobacter; Thermoanaerobacterium; Thermodesulfitimonas

= Thermoanaerobacteraceae =

Family of bacteria

The Thermoanaerobacteraceae is a highly polyphyletic family of bacteria placed within the class clostridia. Originally placed within the highly polyphyletic class Clostridia and order Thermoanaerobacterales, according to the NCBI and LPSN, it is now thought to be a basal clade of the phylum Bacillota.

== Phylogeny ==
The currently accepted taxonomy is based on the List of Prokaryotic names with Standing in Nomenclature (LPSN) and National Center for Biotechnology Information (NCBI).

16S rRNA based LTP_10_2024

- - Thermanaeromonas Mori et al. 2002
  - - Caldanaerobacter
    - Thermoanaerobacter

120 marker proteins based GTDB 10-RS226

- - - Aceticella Frolov et al. 2024
    - Thermoanaerobacterium Lee et al. 1993
  - Thermoanaerobacter Wiegel & Ljungdahl 1982 [incl. Caldanaerobacter Fardeau et al. 2004]

== See also ==
- List of bacterial orders
- List of bacteria genera
