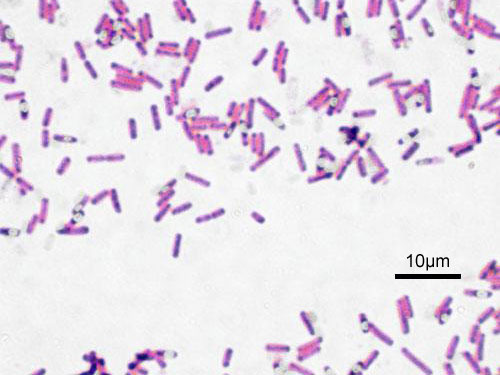
- Bacillus subtilis, Gram-stained

Scientific classification
- Domain: Bacteria
- Kingdom: Bacillati
- Phylum: Bacillota; Gibbons and Murray 2021

Classes and incertae sedis
- Bacilli; "Clostridia"; Culicoidibacteria; Erysipelotrichia; Limnochordia; Negativicutes; Syntrophomonadia; Thermaerobacteria; Thermolithobacteria

Synonyms
- "Bacillaeota" Oren et al. 2015; "Bacillota" Whitman et al. 2018; "Desulfotomaculota" Watanabe et al. 2019; "Endobacteria" (Cavalier-Smith 1998) Cavalier-Smith 2020; "Endobacteria" Cavalier-Smith 1998; "Endospora" Margulis and Schwartz 1998; "Firmacutes" Gibbons and Murray 1978 (Approved Lists 1980); "Firmicutes" (Gibbons & Murray 1978) Garrity & Holt 2001; "Posibacteria" Cavalier-Smith 2002

= Bacillota =

Phylum of bacteria

The Bacillota (synonym "Firmicutes") are a phylum of bacteria, most of which have Gram-positive cell wall structure. They have round cells, called cocci (singular coccus), or rod-like forms (bacillus). A few Bacillota, such as Megasphaera, Pectinatus, Selenomonas, and Zymophilus from the class Negativicutes, have a porous pseudo-outer membrane that causes them to stain Gram-negative. Many Bacillota produce endospores, which are resistant to desiccation and can survive extreme conditions. They are found in various environments, and the group includes some notable pathogens. Those in one family, the Heliobacteria, produce energy through anoxygenic photosynthesis. Bacillota play an important role in beer, wine, and cider spoilage.

== Taxonomy ==
The renaming of phyla such as Firmicutes in 2021 remains controversial among microbiologists, many of whom continue to use the earlier names of long standing in the literature. The name "Firmicutes" was derived from the Latin words for 'tough skin', referring to the thick cell wall typical of bacteria in this phylum. Scientists once classified the Firmicutes to include all Gram-positive bacteria, but have recently defined them to be of a core group of related forms called the low-G+C group, in contrast to the Actinomycetota.

The group is typically divided into the Clostridia, which are anaerobic, and the Bacilli, which are obligate or optional aerobes. On phylogenetic trees, the first two groups show up as paraphyletic or polyphyletic, as do their main genera, Clostridium and Bacillus. However, Bacillota as a whole is generally believed to be monophyletic, or paraphyletic with the exclusion of Mollicutes.

== Evolution ==
The Bacillota are thought by some to be the source of the archaea, by models where the archaea branched relatively late from bacteria, rather than forming an independently originating early lineage (domain of life) from the last universal common ancestor of cellular life (LUCA).

== Phylogeny ==
The currently accepted taxonomy based on the List of Prokaryotic names with Standing in Nomenclature (LPSN) and the National Center for Biotechnology Information (NCBI).

16S rRNA based LTP_01_2022

- - "Thermodesulfobiota"
    - "Thermodesulfobiia"
      "Thermodesulfobiales" ♦

- "Clostridiia" {Clostridiota"} ♦
  - - - - Peptococcales
        - Proteinivoracales
      - Eubacteriales
    - - - - - Limnochordales
            - "Capillibacteriales"
          - - Sulfobacillales
            - - Symbiobacteriales
              - Thermaerobacterales
        - - - Dethiobacterales
            - Natranaerobiales
          - - Gelria
            - - - Koleobacterales
                - - Caldicellulosiruptorales
                  - "Caldanaerobiales"
              - - - Thermacetogeniales
                  - Carboxydothermales
                - - - - Desulfovirgulaceae
                      - Ammonificales
                    - - "Brockiales"
                      - - Dictyoglomerales
                        - Thermosediminibacterales
                  - Thermoanaerobacterales
      - - Tissierellales 1
        - - Tissierellales
          - Peptostreptococcales
  - - - Thermolithobacterales
      - Carboxydocellales
    - - - - - Desulfitibacterales
            - Desulfitisporales
          - - - Calderihabitantales
              - Neomoorellales
            - - Zhaonellaceae
              - Syntrophomonadales
        - - - - - "Thermanaerosceptrales"
                - Thermincolales
              - - "Heliobacteriales"
                - Desulfitobacteriales
            - Desulfotomaculales
          - - Halanaerobiales
            - - "Hydrogenisporales"
              - Selenomonadales
      - - - - Gracilibacteraceae
            - Lutisporales
          - Clostridiales
        - - - Christensenellales
            - - Aristaeellaceae
              - - Mahellales
                - Caldicoprobacterales
          - - - Monoglobales
              - - Acetivibrionales
                - "Oscillospirales"
            - Lachnospirales

- "Bacillia" {Bacillota} ♦
  - - - Hydrogenibacillus
      - Thermicanales
    - - Alicyclobacillales
      - Paenibacillales
  - - Thermoactinomycetales
    - - - Novibacillaceae
        - - Caldalkalibacillales
          - - Caldibacillaceae
            - Calditerricolales
      - - - - Microaerobacter
            - - Desulfuribacillales
              - Tepidibacillales
          - - Oxalophagaceae
            - - Aneurinibacillales
              - Brevibacillales
        - - "Bacillus thermozeamaize"
          - - Bacillales
            - - Listeriaceae
              - - Exiguobacteriales
                - - Staphylococcales
                  - - - Gemellaceae
                      - - Culicoidibacterales
                        - - Turicibacteraceae
                          - - Haloplasmatales
                            - - Acholeplasmatales
                              - - Erysipelotrichales
                                - Mycoplasmatales
                    - Lactobacillales

♦ Paraphyletic Firmicutes

120 marker proteins based GTDB 10-RS226

- - - Bacillota_G
      - Limnochordia
      - "Hydrogenisporia" (UBA4882)
  - - - Bacillota_E
        - "Ca. Acetocimmeria" {UBA3575}
        - - Thermaerobacteria
          - - Symbiobacteriia
            - - "Fermentithermobacillia"
              - Sulfobacillia
    - - - Bacillota_D
          - "Proteinivoracia"
          - - Dethiobacteria
            - Natranaerobiia
        - Bacillota s.s.
          "Bacillia" [incl. Alicyclobacillia; Desulfuribacillia; Culicoidibacteria; Erysipelotrichia; "Izemoplasmatia"; Mollicutes]
      - - - "Selenobacteria"
            "Selenomonadia" [Negativicutes]
          - "Desulfotomaculota"
            - Peptococcia
            - - - - "Thermacetogeniia" [DSM-12270]
                  - Syntrophomonadia
                - - "Dehalobacteriia"
                  - - - Desulfitibacterales {DSM-16504}
                      - - Calderihabitantales {KKC1}
                        - "Metallumcola" {JADQBR01}
                    - - Zhaonellaceae {DULZ01}
                      - Neomoorellales {"Moorellia"}
              - - Desulfitobacteriia
                - - - "Carboxydocellia"
                    - Thermincolia
                  - - "Carboxydothermia"
                    - Desulfotomaculia
        - - "Halanaerobiota"
            "Halanaerobiia"
          - "Clostridiota"
            - Thermosediminibacteria
            - - "Thermoanaerobacteria"
              - "Clostridiia" s.s. [incl. Tissierellia]

== Genera ==
More than 274 genera were considered as of 2016 to be within the Bacillota phylum, notable genera of Bacillota include:

Bacilli, order Bacillales

- Bacillus
- Listeria
- Staphylococcus

Bacilli, order Lactobacillales

- Enterococcus
- Lactobacillus
- Leuconostoc
- Streptococcus

Clostridia

- Clostridioides
- Clostridium
- Selenomonas

Erysipelotrichia

- Erysipelothrix

== Clinical significance ==
Bacillota can make up between 11% to 95% of the human gut microbiome. The phylum Bacillota as part of the gut microbiota has been shown to be involved in energy resorption, and potentially related to the development of diabetes and obesity. In multiple studies a higher abundance of Bacillota has been found in obese individuals than in lean controls. A higher relative abundance of Bacillota was seen in mice fed a western diet (high fat/high sugar) than in mice fed a standard low fat/ high polysaccharide diet. The higher amount of Bacillota was also correlated with more adiposity and body weight within mice. Specifically, within obese mice, the class Mollicutes (within the Bacillota phylum) was the most common. When the microbiota of obese mice with this higher Bacillota abundance was transplanted into the guts of germ-free mice, the germ-free mice gained more fat than those transplanted with the microbiota of lean mice with lower Bacillota abundance.

The presence of Christensenella (Bacillota, in class Clostridia), isolated from human faeces, has been found to correlate with lower body mass index.

Faecalibacterium prausnitzii (F. prausnitzii) is a member of the Bacillota phylum that may have anti-inflammatory effects in humans. This species is associated with reduced low-grade inflammation in obesity. Additionally, patients with inflammatory bowel disease tend to have lower levels of F. prausnitzii.

It was recently mentioned that BilR (Bilirubin Reductase) is a gut microbial enzyme that reduces bilirubin to urobilinogen, emphasizing the role of the gut microbiome in the recycling of heme

=== Pathogenicity ===
Several Bacillota species are common human pathogens. Examples include Bacillus anthracis, Clostridioides difficile, and Clostridium botulinum. Others, such as Staphylococcus aureus and Enterococcus faecalis, are opportunistic pathogens that cause illness in a minority of their hosts. Antibiotic resistance is an increasingly common problem with these infections. Methicillin-resistant S. aureus (MRSA) is estimated to cause 100,000 deaths per year.

== See also ==
- List of bacteria genera
- List of bacterial orders
