= Penstemon deamii =

Conservation status
- Imperiled (NatureServe)

Scientific classification
- Kingdom: Plantae
- Clade: Tracheophytes
- Clade: Angiosperms
- Clade: Eudicots
- Clade: Asterids
- Order: Lamiales
- Family: Plantaginaceae
- Genus: Penstemon
- Species: P. deamii

Binomial name
- Penstemon deamii Pennell

Synonyms
- Penstemon laevigatus var. deamii

Plant species in the veronica family

Penstemon deamii, Deam's penstemon, is a rare species in the veronica family that only grows wild in the southern parts of the US state of Indiana.

== Description ==
Deam's penstemon is a herbaceous perennial that grows flowering stems that are 40 to 90 centimeters (16–35 in) tall. Each plant can have one or more flowering stems that are a dull green or rarely somewhat purple; they are always covered in stiff backwards pointing hairs towards the base, but might not be towards the top, but are never glaucous.

The species has both basal leaves and leaves attached to the flowering stems, but the basal leaves can have faded by the time a plant flowers. The leaves are not leathery, are nearly hairless to covered in short, thin, erect hairs, with a slightly lighter green underside. They have tapered bases, and edges that are smooth, denticulate, or even serrulate in the uppermost leaves. The basal leaves and lowest ones on the stems are 4–15 centimeters (1.5–6 in) long and 1–2.6 cm (0.4–1.0 in) wide with oval to elliptic shape. The stems will have 14 or 16 leaves arranged in pairs and attached to opposite sides, the uppermost 1.7–11 cm (0.7–4.3 in) long and 0.3–2 cm wide and oblanceolate to lanceolate in shape and can clasp the stem.

The small flower are white or just blushed with violet, though also usually marked with purple floral guide lines inside the flower tube. The fused funnel shaped petals are usually 1.5–2 cm long, but can reach 2 cm at times. The sepals separate into five lobes, each 1.5–4 mm long, though often shorter than 3.5 mm. The staminode is covered in yellowish hairs towards the end and is 8–10 mm long, just reaches the opening of the flower. but the four stamens do not reach the mouth of the flower.

The flowers are in four to six groups, each with two points where the flowers attach with two to eight on the branching flower stems. The inflorescence at the top of each flowering stem is 11–22 centimeters (4.3–8.7 in) long.

The fruit is a hairless capsule 5–8 mm long and 4–5 mm wide.

== Taxonomy ==
In 1935 Penstemon deamii was scientifically described and named by Francis W. Pennell. The type specimen was collected by Pennell on 17 June 1933 in the Clark State Forest near Henryville in Clark County, Indiana. It was proposed by Ralph W. Bennett that it was better classified as a variety of Penstemon laevigatus in 1963, but A. C. Koelling published in 1964 supporting evidence that it though closely related that it is a distinct species alongside other close relatives including Penstemon calycosus and Penstemon digitalis. The species is classified in the Penstemon genus as part of the Plantaginaceae family and has no subspecies.

=== Names ===
The species name was selected by Pennell to honor Charles Clemon Deam, the author of an Indiana Flora, who found and guided Pennell to the specimen that was collected to describe the species. It is similarly known by the common names Deam's penstemon or Deam's beardtongue.

== Range and habitat ==
Although the Natural Resources Conservation Service records Deam's penstemon in seven counties in Illinois, these are believed to be based on misidentified specimens. In the Flora of North America, Plants of the World Online and NatureServe the species is listed as endemic to the state of Indiana. There it is reliably known to have grown in northwestern Harrison, western Floyd, western Clark, southwestern Washington, and southwestern Scott counties in the southernmost part of the state with a disjunct population in Marion County in the Indianapolis metro area. However, the Marion County was tentative and has not been reliably reported since it was recorded in 1940 and similarly the populations in northwestern Harrison County probably no longer exist.

It can be found at elevations of 100–200 meters (330–660 ft) growing in rocky oak woods and fields. The total size of its range is estimated to be 1,100 square kilometers (420 sq mi).

=== Conservation ===
Deam's penstemon was evaluated in 2025 by NatureServe and evaluated as imperiled at the global and state level (G2 and S2). Its total population is 1,000 to 2,500 plants in fourteen populations. The lack of fire in many areas is causing meadows to be lost to tree growth and its habitat is quite fragmented. Many historical populations have been lost or have not been recently evaluated.

== See also ==
- List of Penstemon species
