= Smooth penstemon =

Smooth penstemon or smooth beardtongue is a common name for several plants and may refer to:

- Penstemon digitalis, native to eastern North America
- Penstemon glaber, native to western North America from Montana to Chihuahua
- Penstemon laevis, native to Arizona and Utah in the western US
- Penstemon laevigatus, native to the eastern United States
- Penstemon subglaber, native to Wyoming, Utah, and Idaho in the western US
