= Penstemon subglaber =

Conservation status
- Vulnerable (NatureServe)

Scientific classification
- Kingdom: Plantae
- Clade: Tracheophytes
- Clade: Angiosperms
- Clade: Eudicots
- Clade: Asterids
- Order: Lamiales
- Family: Plantaginaceae
- Genus: Penstemon
- Species: P. subglaber

Binomial name
- Penstemon subglaber Rydb.

Synonyms
- Penstemon glaber var. utahensis S.Watson; Penstemon utahensis (S.Watson) A.Nelson

Plant species in the veronica family

Penstemon subglaber, the glabrous penstemon, is a species from Utah, Wyoming, and Idaho in the western US with blue flowers.

== Description ==
The glabrous penstemon is perennial herb that grows a few to many flowering stems from a substantial caudex. The stems are hairless towards the base and have sparse glandular hairs above. They typically grow 18 to 90 centimeters (7–35 in) tall, but can be as little as 10 cm (4 in) or as much as 1.3 meters (4 ft 3 in).

The plants have both basal leaves and ones attached to the flowering stems, they are not leathery, not glaucous, and hairless. The basal leaves and the lowest ones on the stems are 3.5–17 centimeters (1.5–6.5 in) long, though usually usually less than 14 cm (5.5 in), with a width of 0.8–2.4 cm wide. The flowering stems will have three to eleven leaf pairs attached to opposite sides below the flowers, though usually no more than six. The upper leaves can have a short leaf stalk, be attached by the base, or even have the base clasping the stem. If not clasping the stem the base will taper and the tip is always pointed with an overall length of 2.8–13 cm (1–5 in), though usually less than 9.5 cm (3.5 in) and a width of 0.4–1.5 cm.

The flowers are usually moderately to deeply blue, but sometimes individuals with pink or white white flowers are seen, with violet floral guide lines. The flowers are funnel shaped with a fairly large swelling on the lower side and strongly two-lipped. The tube of the flower is violet while throat is often somewhat white, though the lobes are deep blue. The flowers are covered with glandular hairs, though sometimes only very faintly. The stamens are generally contained within the flower's tube, but the longer pair can reach the mouth.

== Taxonomy ==
Penstemon subglaber was initially described in 1871 by Sereno Watson as a variety of the similar Penstemon glaber named utahensis. The botanist Aven Nelson described it as a species in 1899, but used the name Penstemon utahensis, which was unavailable due to being already used for another species. The replacement name Penstemon subglaber was published by Per Axel Rydberg in 1909.

=== Names ===
The species name, subglaber, is Botanical Latin meaning "almost smooth". Penstemon subglaber is frequently called smooth penstemon, however this name is also used for many other species such as Penstemon laevis. It is also known by the common names glabrous penstemon or northern smooth beardtongue.

== Range and habitat ==
Glabrous penstemons are native to Idaho, Utah, and Wyoming. In Idaho they are found near Pocatello. They grow on the Fish Lake and Wasatch plateaus, and in the Wasatch and Uinta mountains. To the east in Wyoming they are known from the Gros Ventre Range and Wind River Mountains. It has been reported to have escaped from gardens in Mono County, California. It has also been found on the Kaibab Plateau in Coconino County, Arizona where it could be confused with the also introduced Rocky Mountain penstemon (Penstemon strictus). In its native habitat it grows at elevations of 1,600 to 3,400 meters (5,200–11,200 ft) according to the Flora of North America, however in A Utah Flora it is reported that it seldom, if ever, grows above timberline.

The species is associated with sagebrush scrub, mountain brush, snowberry-tall forb, sagebrush-grass, and Gambel oak communities. At higher elevations they grow in openings in aspen dominated biomes and conifer forests. Within these habitats it grow in areas that are moderately moist to dry.

== See also ==
- List of Penstemon species
