= Penstemon subulatus =

- In Saguaro National Park

Conservation status
- Apparently Secure (NatureServe)

Scientific classification
- Kingdom: Plantae
- Clade: Tracheophytes
- Clade: Angiosperms
- Clade: Eudicots
- Clade: Asterids
- Order: Lamiales
- Family: Plantaginaceae
- Genus: Penstemon
- Species: P. subulatus

Binomial name
- Penstemon subulatus M.E.Jones

Plant species in the veronica family

Penstemon subulatus, the hackberry penstemon, is a red flowered plant in the veronica family that only grows wild in central Arizona in the southwestern United States.

== Description ==
Hackberry penstemons are herbaceous perennials with a woody caudex that grow flowering stems that are 20 to 75 centimeters (8–29.5 in) tall. Each plant produces one to eight stems that grow straight upwards or lean outwards from the base of the plant before growing upwards. The stems are sometimes glaucous, covered in pale natural waxes.

Unlike the stems, the leaves are always glaucous, as well as being hairless, having a leathery texture, a rough to almost warty surface, and smooth edges. Plants have both basal leaves and leaves attached to the stems. The basal leaves and the lowest ones on the stems are 2.8–10 cm (1–4 in) long, but just 2–11 millimeters wide. They have a tapered base and an oblanceolate to elliptic shape. The stems will have five to nine leaf pairs attached to opposite sides of the stems. The uppermost leaves can be 1.1–12 cm (0.4–4.7 in) long, but more often 3–8 cm (1.2–3.1 in), but with a width of just 2–9 millimeters. They are narrowly lanceolate or grass-like with a base that clasps the stem or even with small 'ears' sticking out.

The very narrow tube shaped flowers are carmine to scarlet in color. They are held nearly horizontally or slightly hanging downwards. The flowers open to five short lobes with rounded tips, darker floral guide lines can extend from inside the flower onto the lobes or can be absent. They are nearly radially symmetrical, though with a weak two lipped shape, hairless inside and out, and with a length of 1.3–2.5 centimeters (0.5–1 in) from base to opening.

The flowers are in an inflorescence that is 5–40 cm (2–15.5 in) at the top of the stem. Each one will have 5 to 14 groups of flowers, each well spread out with flowers pointing in all directions away from the stem. Usually each group, called a verticillaster, will have two points where the flowers attach by usually branched flower stalks, with one to five flowers for each point of attachment.

The fruits are dry capsules 6‒12 mm long and 3‒7 mm wide. The seeds are 1.2–2.5 mm and brown.

== Taxonomy ==
The botanist Marcus E. Jones described a new species in the Penstemon genus in 1908, which he named Penstemon subulatus. Together with the genus the species is part of the Plantaginaceae family and has no botanical synonyms.

=== Names ===
The scientific name, subulatus, means awl-shaped in Botanical Latin. It is known by the common names hackberry penstemon or hackberry beardtongue. Less frequently, it is called the Arizona scarlet-bugler.

== Range and habitat ==
Cave Creek Regional Park, Maricopa County, Arizona

The hackberry penstemon is endemic to central Arizona. There is can be found in Yuma, Maricopa, Pinal, Graham, Gila, and Mohave counties at elevations of 500 to 1,300 meters (1,600–4,300 ft).

It grows in desert and semi-desert habitats, on rocky slopes, mesas, and in canyons. It is widespread below the Mogollon Rim.

=== Conservation and ecology ===
In 1999 NatureServe evaluated the hackberry penstemon as apparently secure at the global and state level (G4, S4). They noted it as quite abundant within its natural range. Like other red colored penstemons such as the Utah penstemon, the species is adapted to pollination by hummingbirds.

== Uses ==
Hackberry penstemons are cultivated in southern Arizona and New Mexico for their long blooming period and showy, clumping habit. It is propigated by seeds, which require a twelve week cold-moist stratification.

== See also ==
- List of Penstemon species
