= P. digitalis =

P. digitalis may refer to:

- Penstemon digitalis, a plantain species
- Physostegia digitalis, a perennial plant species in the genus Physostegia

== See also ==
- Digitalis
