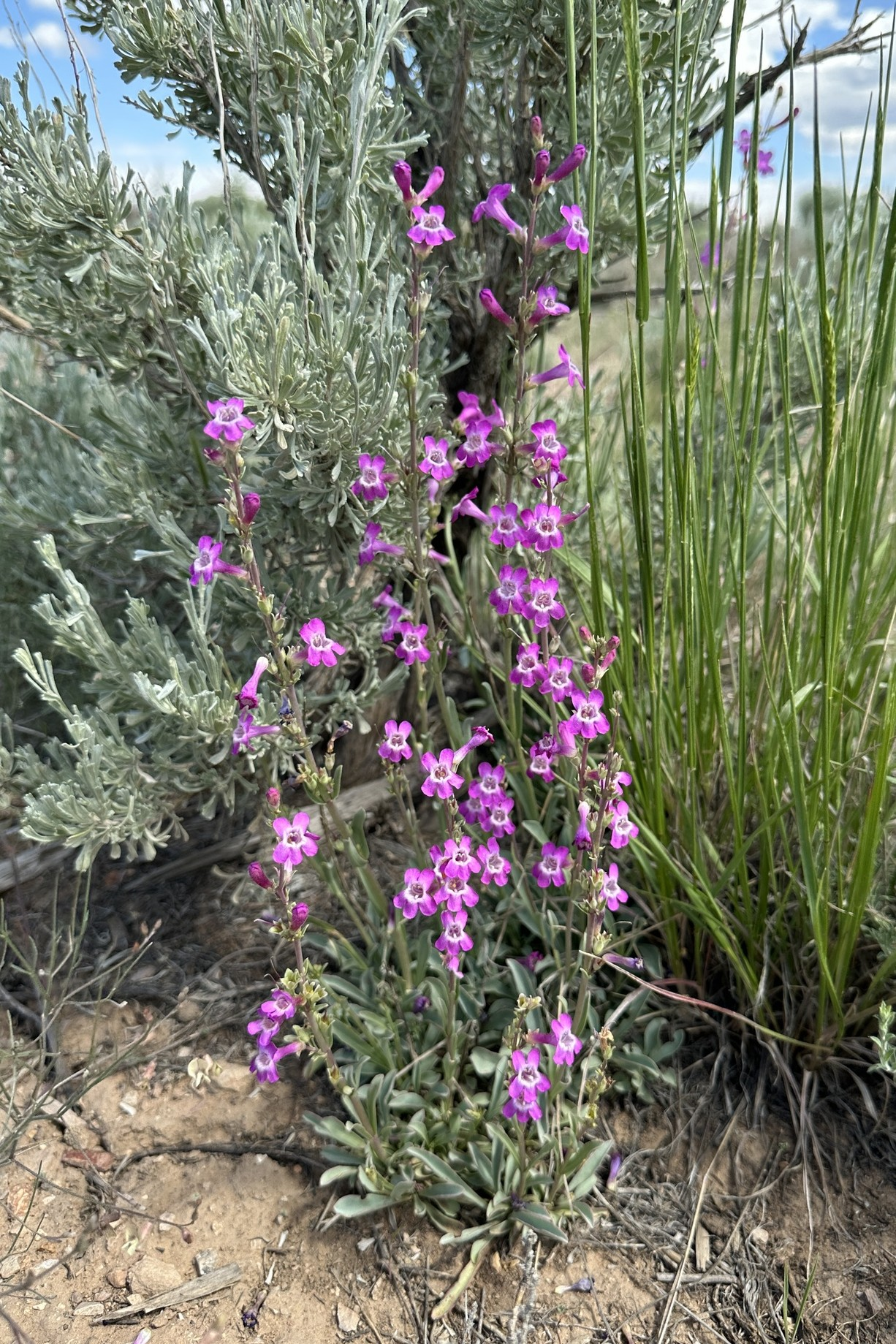
- Beaver County, Utah

Scientific classification
- Kingdom: Plantae
- Clade: Tracheophytes
- Clade: Angiosperms
- Clade: Eudicots
- Clade: Asterids
- Order: Lamiales
- Family: Plantaginaceae
- Genus: Penstemon
- Species: P. confusus

Binomial name
- Penstemon confusus M.E.Jones

= Penstemon confusus =

Plant species in the veronica family

Penstemon confusus, the mistaken penstemon, is a plant species in the veronica family from the western United States in Utah, Nevada, and Arizona.

== Description ==
Mistaken penstemons have one to a few flowering stems that grow from a thick or branching crown. The stems can be 3 to 44 centimeters (1.2–17.3 in) tall, but usually do not exceed 40 cm (16 in), and are hairless, glaucous, and typically turn a dark color when drying.

The leaves a fairly thick with a fleshy texture, for a pensetemon, and hairless and glaucous like the stems with smooth edges. Mistaken penstemons have leaves that attach to the stems as well as basal leaves, the lower leaves of the stems and the basal ones typically measuring 3 to 6 centimeters (1.2–2.4 in) long, though occasionally as short as 2.5 cm (1 in). They are oblanceolate with a tapering base, but just 0.5 to 1.4 cm wide. The stems have two or three leaf pairs attached to opposite sides, the upper ones attaching directly to the stem and measuring 1.5–5.7 cm (0.59–2.24 in) long by just 2–12 millimeters wide. They resemble a blade of grass or a narrow spear head.

The flowers are small in size, the corollas measuring 1.4 to 2 cm long, and rose-violet to rose-lavender in color. They are bilaterally symmetrical with a throat that is lighter in color than the flower's lobes. The outside of the flower is hairless, but there are sparse white hairs on the lower side of the tube and often red-purple floral guide lines. The flowers are in seven to eleven groups that only occasionally are far enough apart to show distinct gaps. Each group usually has two points of attachment, but sometimes just one, above a pair of bracts 1–7.2 cm long. Each point of attachment can produce one to four flowers that are secund, all facing away from the stem in the same direction. The staminode is 8–9 mm long and is usually covered in small, golden-yellow, elongated bumps, but can rarely be smooth. It blooms as early as April or as late as June in its native habitat.

The fruit is a capsule 8–11 mm long and 4–6 mm wide.

It is quite similar to the Utah penstemon (Penstemon utahensis), which has somewhat taller stems and larger flowers that are strong carmine-red, rosy, or pink.

== Taxonomy ==
Penstemon confusus was scientifically described and named by Marcus E. Jones in 1893. It is part of the genus Penstemon which is classified in the Plantaginaceae family.

=== Names ===
The Botanical Latin species name, confusus, is a reference to it being previously misidentified. Jones noted in his description of the species that specimens had previously been identified as Penstemon acuminatus by Asa Gray and Sereno Watson. Penstemon confusus is similarly known by the common name mistaken penstemon. Although it is known as the Owens Valley beardtongue in sources such as the Natural Resources Conservation Service plants database, it is not known to grow in the Owens Valley in California.

== Range and habitat ==
Mistaken penstemons are native to Utah, Nevada, and Arizona. They grow in western Utah as far east as Sanpete County and as far north as southern Tooele County. The species is found in southeastern Nevada in four counties, White Pine, Nye, Lincoln, and Clark. In Arizona it is confined to the northwestern part of the state. It grows at elevations as low as 1,700 meters (5,600 ft) or as high as 2,200 meters (7,200 ft).

It grow in rocky soils that are usually calcareous, high in lime or chalk, in the sagebrush steppe or pinyon–juniper woodlands.

== See also ==
- List of Penstemon species
