= Deam Lake State Recreation Area =

State recreation area in Indiana, U.S.

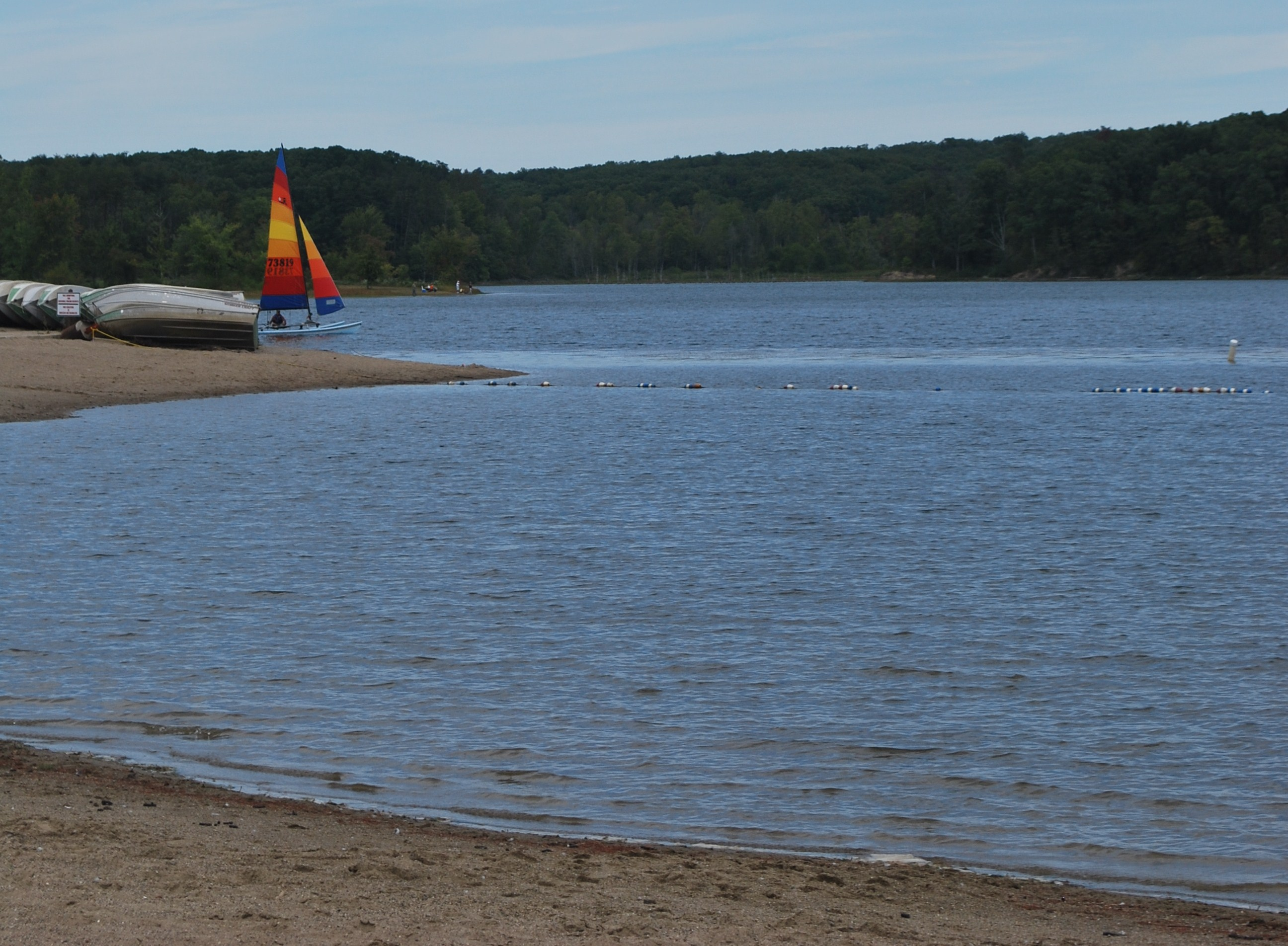
- Deam Lake State Recreation Area in 2012

- Location within Indiana Location within the United States
- Location: Clark County, Indiana, United States
- Coordinates: 38°28′10″N 85°51′35″W
- Area: 1,300 acres (5.3 km^{2})
- Elevation: 535 ft (163 m)
- Established: 1965
- Named for: Charles C. Deam
- Governing body: Indiana Department of Natural Resources
- Website: Deam Lake State Recreation Area

Deam Lake State Recreation Area is an Indiana State Recreation Area in Clark County, Indiana in the United States. The park is 1,300 acres (530 ha) and sits at an elevation of 535 feet (163 m). Deam Lake State Recreation area is open for year-round recreation, however the campground closes each year from the Sunday before Thanksgiving to March 1 of the following year. Much of the recreation is centered on Deam Lake. It is named for Charles C. Deam, the first state forester of Indiana.

Deam Lake State Recreation Area is adjacent to Clark State Forest. Deam Lake and the park facilities were constructed during the 1960s, opening in 1965. The park operates under a "multiple use concept." Recreational activities at the park include hiking, fishing, hunting, swimming, boating, camping, picnicking and horseback riding.

Deam Lake is a 194 acres (79 ha) man-made lake. It was built in 1965. The lake is used for flood control, as a reservoir and for recreational purposes. It is on Big Run which is a tributary of the Muddy Fork River which is part of the Ohio River system. The lake is impounded by Deam Lake Dam which is an earthen dam that is 59 feet (18 m) high and 1,200 feet (370 m) long. Deam Lake is open for fishing, swimming and boating. Boats are limited to electric motors. Kayaks, canoes and other human powered boats are permitted. Jet-skis are not allowed in the lake. The beach at Deam Lake is open from 8:00am to sunset, Memorial Day through Labor Day. Lifeguards are not provided. There is a beach house and concessionaire that provides snacks and boat rentals.

Deam Lake State Recreation Area features two separate camping facilities. The "regular campground" has 116 campsites that include picnic tables, electric hookups, a fire ring, and parking pad. Access to a dump station for RVs and shower facilities is available. Additionally, the park has 68 "horse campground" sites. The horse campground is equipped with stalls and provides access to a network of trails within the park and the adjacent Clark State Forest.

The park is home to four hiking trails and serves as a trailhead for the 80-mile (130 km) Knobstone Trail which is the longest hiking trail in Indiana.

Trail 1 is a 0.6-mile (0.97 km) "easy trail." It begins near the campground and ends at the old playground. Trail 1 is used for a variety of special hikes during the year, including "A Walk in the Woods" which is designed for families with children and the annual "The Haunted Trail" which takes place near Halloween.
Trail 2 is 0.5-mile (0.80 km). Access to the trail has been limited in the aftermath of a severe wind storm in 2008 and an ice storm in 2009. Much of the trail is covered by fallen Virginia Pines.
Trail 3 is the longest trail in the park at 6 miles (9.7 km). It begins at the campground and is covered with gravel. It serves hikers, horseback riders and mountain bikers. The trail passes around the north end of Deam Lake and is connected to Knobstone Trail via several side trails.
Trail 4 also known as Lake Vista Trail is 1.6 miles (2.6 km) and follows the shores of the lake, passes through some wet bottom lands and runs over rolling hills to a vista at a rocky outcrop over the lake.

Environmental Education opportunities are provided at Deam Lake State Recreation Area. An education center is managed by a seasonal naturalist. The naturalist hosts a variety of educational sessions throughout the year. A fishing derby for children is led by the naturalist as is a digital camera scavenger hunt, a tree identification program, a group hike on Trail 4 to Lookout Rock and several other nature activities.
