= Knobstone =

Knobstone may refer to:

- Knobstone Escarpment, a geologic region in Southern Indiana
- Knobstone Trail, a long-distance hiking trail in Indiana
