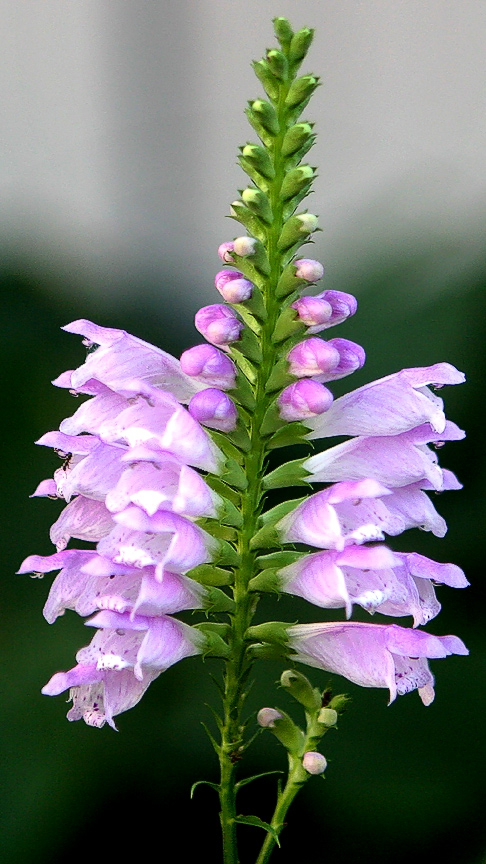

Conservation status
- Secure (NatureServe)

Scientific classification
- Kingdom: Plantae
- Clade: Tracheophytes
- Clade: Angiosperms
- Clade: Eudicots
- Clade: Asterids
- Order: Lamiales
- Family: Lamiaceae
- Genus: Physostegia
- Species: P. virginiana

Binomial name
- Physostegia virginiana (L.) Benth.

= Physostegia virginiana =

Species of flowering plant

Physostegia virginiana, the obedient plant, obedience or false dragonhead, is a species of flowering plant in the mint family, Lamiaceae. It is native to North America, where it is distributed from eastern Canada to northern Mexico. Physostegia are known commonly as obedient plants because a flower pushed to one side will often stay in that position. The name “false dragonhead” refers to the dragonheads of the related Dracocephalum, a genus to which the plant once belonged.

== Description ==
It is a rhizomatous herbaceous perennial producing clumps of stiff, squared stems 2–4 ft (0.61–1.22 m) tall. The leaves are lanceolate and toothed. The inflorescence is a long, dense raceme containing many tubular pink flowers which resemble snapdragons. The open fruit is shaped like a vase and contains four triangular, black seeds.

== Taxonomy ==
There are two recognized subspecies. They are:

- Physostegia virginiana ssp. praemorsa - Widespread further south, to Texas and New Mexico. It has larger flowers, with sterile bracts below the inflorescence, and lacks rhizomes. It is typically found in dry upland sites such as prairies and glades.
- Physostegia virginiana ssp. virginiana - Found further north and west. It has smaller flowers that lack sterile bracts. It is patch-forming from rhizomes. It is typically found in wetter habitats, such as streambanks and bottomlands.

Cultivars of P. virginiana often do not fit well into either of the two varieties and are intermediate in character. They are thought to have originated from hybridization between the two subspecies.

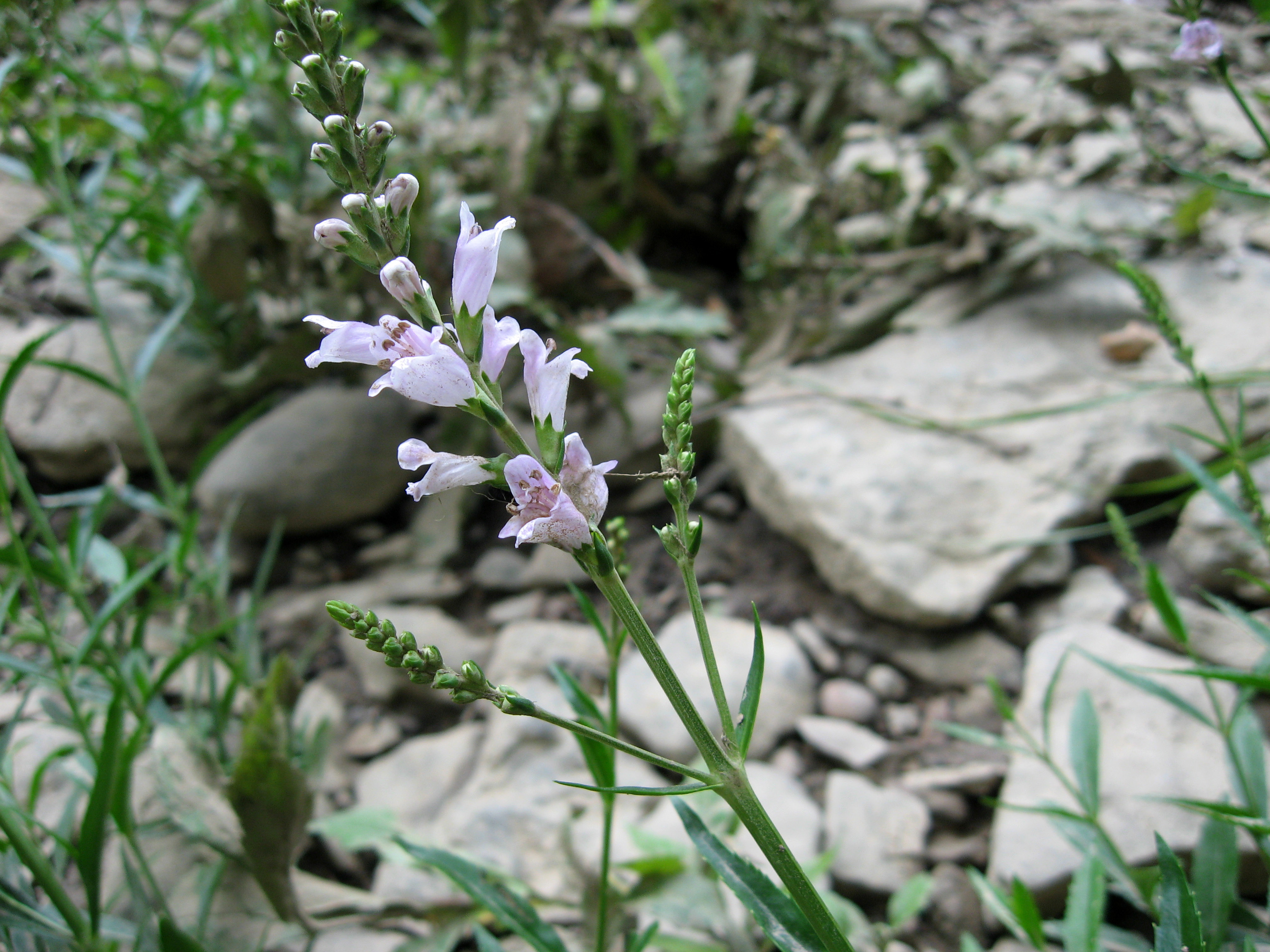
Subspecies virginiana has a smaller flower that lacks sterile bracts

== Cultivation ==
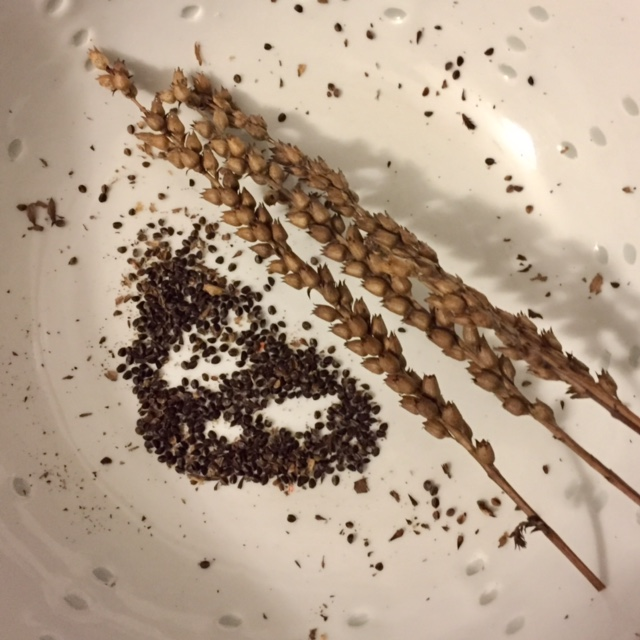
Seeds of Physostegia

It is considered a good plant for adding late-season flowers to a garden. Fertile soils produce robust growth and wide spreading, and the plant may require staking. When it grows tall it has a "tendency toward floppiness" that can be controlled with pruning. It can be aggressive and dominate a landscape.

=== Cultivars ===
Several cultivars have been bred for color variety. Some (agm) have earned the Royal Horticultural Society's Award of Garden Merit.

Cultivars include.

- 'Alba' - white flowers.
- 'Crown of Snow' - white flowers
- 'Pink Bouquet' - rose pink flowers
- 'Rosea' - pink flowers
- 'Rosy Spire' - lavender-pink flowers
- 'Summer Snow' (agm) - pure white flowers
- 'Variegata' - pink flowers, green and white variegated leaves
- 'Vivid' (agm) - bright pink flowers
