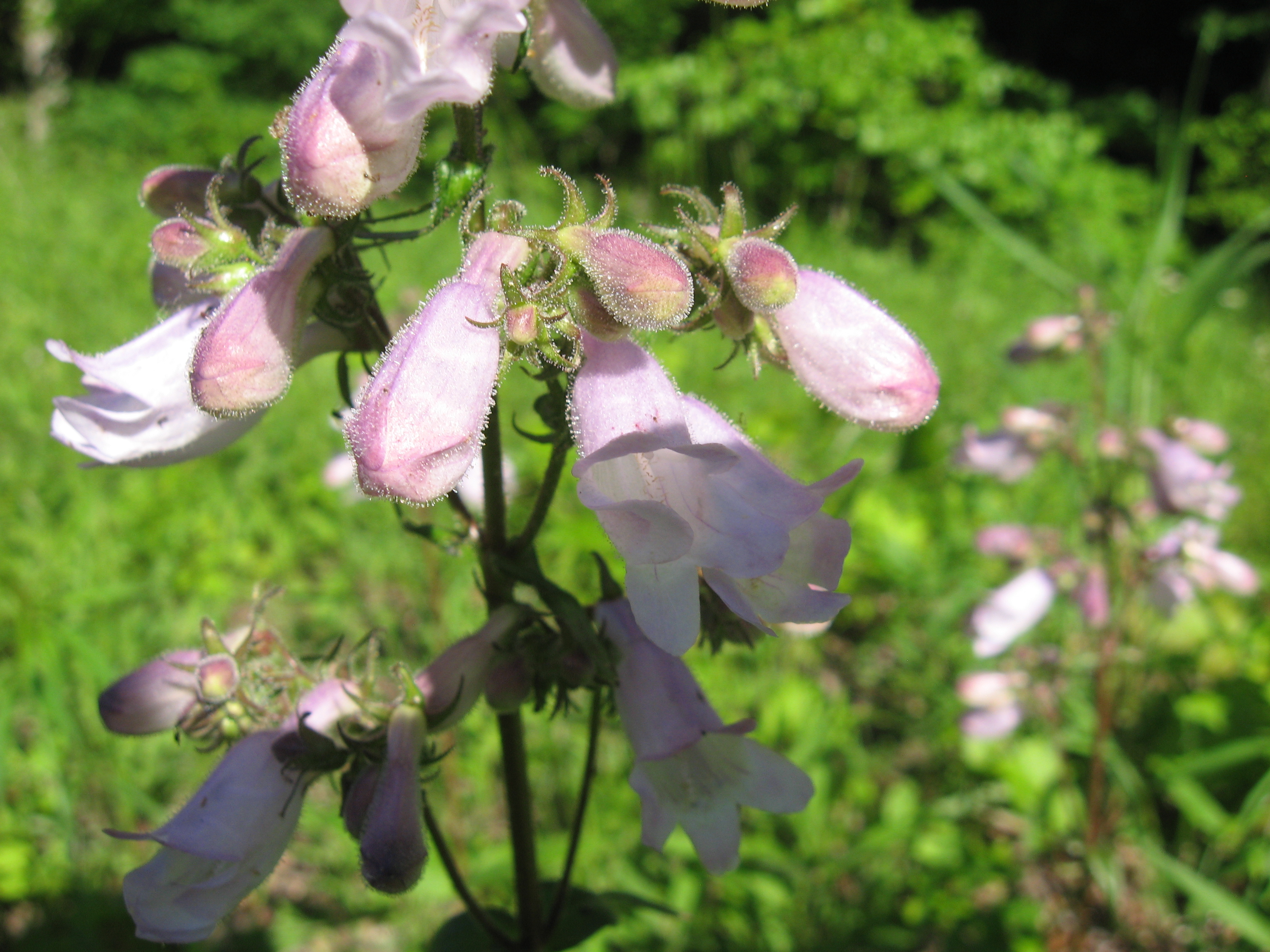

Conservation status
- Secure (NatureServe)

Scientific classification
- Kingdom: Plantae
- Clade: Tracheophytes
- Clade: Angiosperms
- Clade: Eudicots
- Clade: Asterids
- Order: Lamiales
- Family: Plantaginaceae
- Genus: Penstemon
- Species: P. calycosus

Binomial name
- Penstemon calycosus Small

Synonyms
- Penstemon laevigatus subsp. calycosus (Small) R.W.Benn.; Penstemon laevigatus var. calycosus (Small) Farw.; Penstemon smallii var. calycosus (Small) Krautter

= Penstemon calycosus =

Plant species in the plantain family

Penstemon calycosus, commonly called long-sepal beardtongue, is a species of plant in the plantain family (Plantaginaceae). It is native to eastern North America, where it is native to the Upper South and Midwestern United States. It expanded its range into the northeast United States in the early 20th century. Its natural habitat is in open woodlands, prairies, and bluffs, often over limestone.

== Description ==
Penstemon calycosus is an herbaceous plant with stems that grow to between 40–120 cm (16–47 in) in height, though usually more than 60 cm (24 in). The stems grow from shallow roots with many branches. It is a relatively long lived perennial, for a penstemon.

Plants have both basal and cauline leaves, those at the base of the plant and ones that sprout from the stems. The basal leaves are present during the winter months. By the time of flowering the basal leaves have usually withered. The leaves are not leathery in texture and are hairless. The lowest leaves range in length from 4.7–11 cm (1.9–4.3 in). Their edges have irregular teeth and their color is green, though somewhat pale on the underside.

The inflorescence is less than one-third the total height of the plant. The flowers are grouped on the stem in two to five clusters each with two paired cymes at each node. Each cyme has a bract under it and one to fifteen flowers.

Penstemon calycosus has some of the largest and showiest flowers of the penstemons native to the eastern United States. They measure 2.0–3.5 cm (0.79–1.38 in) long with a diameter of 0.8–1.1 cm (0.31–0.43 in). Externally the flowers are pale lavender to violet with faint nectar guides. It blooms in late spring and early summer, early in May to early in July depending on location.

Penstemon calycosus is similar to the more widespread Penstemon digitalis. P. calycosus can be distinguished from P. digitalis by its purple flowers and longer, attenuate sepals.

== Taxonomy ==
In 1898 Penstemon calycosus was named and scientifically described by John Kunkel Small. The species was described from specimens collected by Eugene P. Bicknell on bluffs near the Cumberland River outside Nashville, Tennessee.

=== Names ===
In English it is known by the common names of long-sepal penstemon or long-sepal beardtongue. In the plant trade it is occasionally called calico penstemon.

== Range and habitat ==
Penstemon calycosus is widespread in the eastern half United States and is also found in a small part of Canada. In the southeastern United States it is native to the District of Columbia, Alabama, Georgia, Kentucky, North Carolina, South Carolina, Tennessee, and Virginia. Reports of it in Maryland are specifically listed as erroneous by Plants of the World Online. In the midwest it has been reported in Illinois, Indiana, Michigan, Minnesota, Missouri, and Ohio. In the northeast it is native in the states of Connecticut, Maine, Massachusetts, New Jersey, Pennsylvania, Rhode Island, and Vermont. It is an introduced species in New York state. In Canada it is only known from the province of Ontario. The botanist Francis W. Pennell reported that its range increased in the northeast during the early 20th century in central New York and the lower Connecticut Valley.

It grows in a variety of habitats including forests, meadows, rocky slopes, and along stream banks. It grows on sandy or loam soils and prefers calcareous soils, those with a large limestone or chalk component.

=== Conservation ===
The status of Penstemon calycosus was last evaluated by NatureServe in 1988. At that time they evaluated the species as secure (G5) at the global level. They also take an alternate view of where the species has been introduced, listing not only Ontario, but also all of New England except for Massachusetts as non-native as well as New Jersey. They list it as apparently secure (S4) in Kentucky and imperiled (S2) in Michigan. They also found it to be probably locally extinct in Virginia and Georgia.

== See also ==
List of Penstemon species
