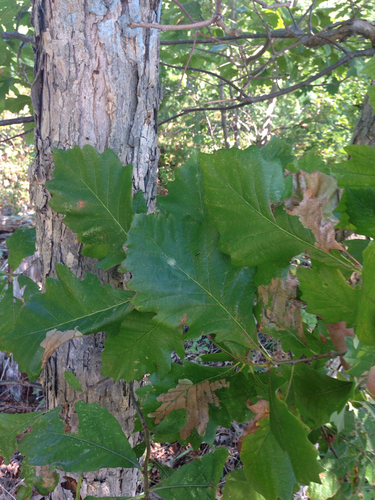

Scientific classification
- Kingdom: Plantae
- Clade: Tracheophytes
- Clade: Angiosperms
- Clade: Eudicots
- Clade: Rosids
- Order: Fagales
- Family: Fagaceae
- Genus: Quercus
- Species: Q. × deamii

Binomial name
- Quercus × deamii Trel.

Synonyms
- Quercus × fallax E.J.Palmer

= Quercus × deamii =

Hybrid of oak tree

Quercus × deamii (or Quercus deamii), known as Deam's oak, is a naturally occurring hybrid of chinquapin oak (Quercus muehlenbergii) and burr oak (Quercus macrocarpa). It occurs sporadically where their ranges overlap in the eastern United States and eastern Canada. It is named for self-taught botanist and state forester of Indiana Charles C. Deam, who had forwarded samples to William Trelease for description. They thought it to be a cross of Quercus alba and Q. muehlenbergii due to the large numbers of those trees growing in the vicinity. Many sources still reference Q. × deamii as a hybrid of the white oak and chinkapin oak.

Quercus × deamii is a forest tree with pale bark and a spreading crown of stout branches. The twigs and leaf undersides are short-hairy.

When the original tree was marked for felling, Deam managed to buy the 0.2 acres (0.08 ha) of land it stood on for the state. It is now the Deam Oak Monument Forest, at 40°46′42.4″N 85°11′35.3″W, with the tree still alive as of May 2020. A cultivar, 'Champion Seedless', with the ortet being the Deam oak, is available from specialty nurseries. As the name suggests, it does not produce acorns, a desirable trait in certain garden and landscaping applications.
