= Physostegia correllii =

Conservation status
- Imperiled (NatureServe)

Scientific classification
- Kingdom: Plantae
- Clade: Embryophytes
- Clade: Tracheophytes
- Clade: Angiosperms
- Clade: Eudicots
- Clade: Asterids
- Order: Lamiales
- Family: Lamiaceae
- Genus: Physostegia
- Species: P. correllii

Binomial name
- Physostegia correllii (Lundell) Shinners

Species of flowering plant

Physostegia correllii is a species of flowering plant in the mint family, Lamiaceae. It is sometimes referred to by the common name Correll's false dragonhead.

== Description ==
This rhizomatous perennial herb may reach heights over 4 ft (1.2 m). It produces spikes of flowers in June through September. The flowers are purple with darker streaks. The flowers are pollinated by bumblebees.

== Distribution and habitat ==
It is native to northern Mexico, as well as Texas and Louisiana in the United States. Most occurrences are historical and have not been seen recently. Today it is known from one location in Travis County, Texas, and two or three locations in Louisiana, and its current distribution in Mexico is unknown. This plant is a wetland species that can be found today in wet, disturbed areas such as drainage ditches.
