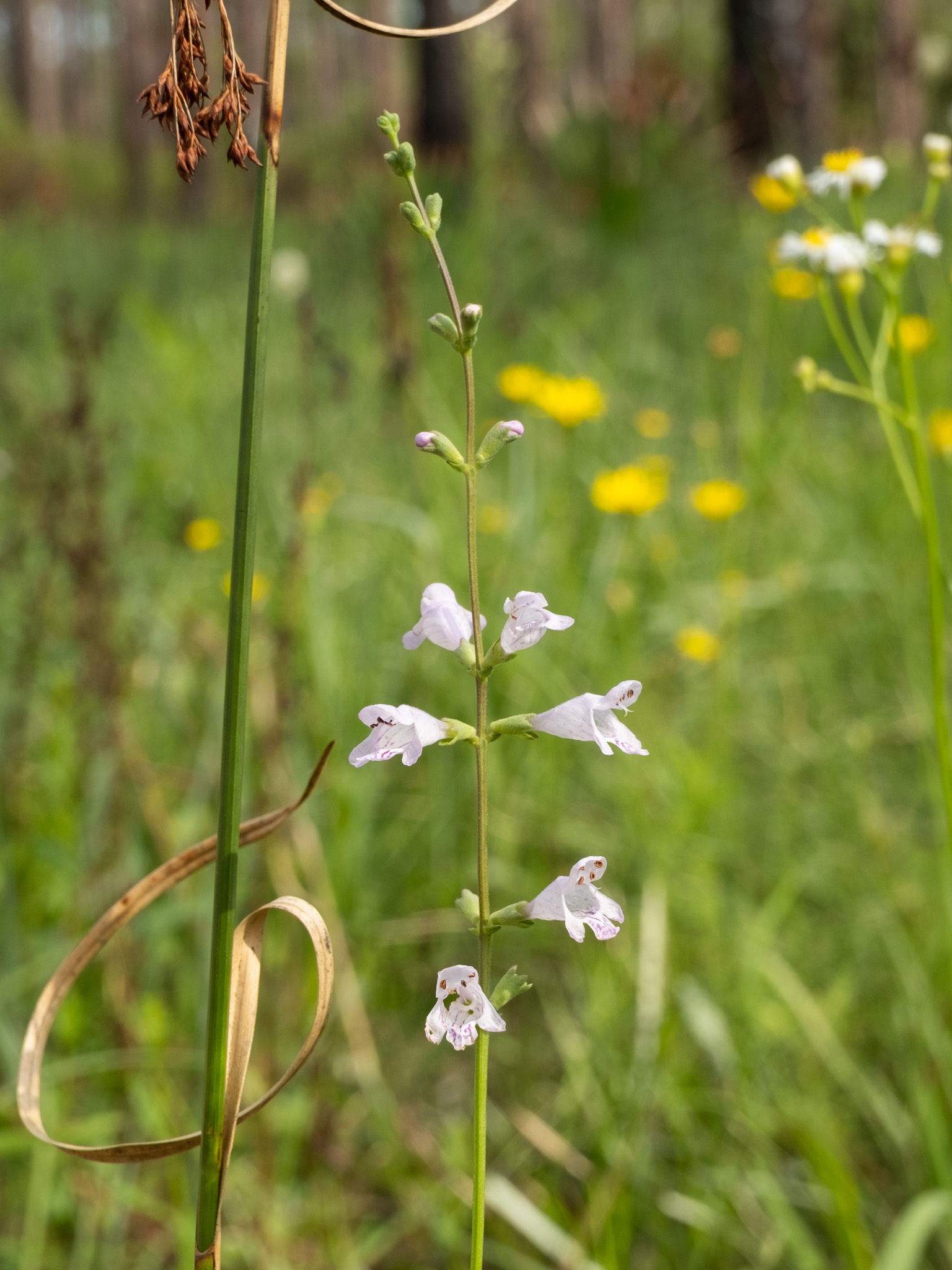

Scientific classification
- Kingdom: Plantae
- Clade: Tracheophytes
- Clade: Angiosperms
- Clade: Eudicots
- Clade: Asterids
- Order: Lamiales
- Family: Lamiaceae
- Genus: Physostegia
- Species: P. godfreyi

Binomial name
- Physostegia godfreyi P.D.Cantino

= Physostegia godfreyi =

Species of flowering plant

Physostegia godfreyi, the Appalachicola dragonhead or Godfrey's false dragonhead, is a flowering plant endemic to the southern part of the Florida panhandle from Walton County to Wakulla County. A short-lived perennial it grows up to 1.5 feet tall. It grows in open wet savanna. It is in the mint (Lamiaceae) family and produces nutlets. It produces lavender purple flowers with darker veins.
