= Syllable stress of botanical Latin =

Syllable stress of botanical names varies with the language spoken by the person using the botanical name. In English-speaking countries, the Botanical Latin places syllable stress for botanical names derived from ancient Greek and Latin broadly according to two systems, either the Reformed academic pronunciation, or the traditional English pronunciation. The two systems differ significantly in pronunciation but not in syllable stress.

What follow are the rules of stress of reformed academic pronunciation of Latin (intended to approximate the stress rules of ancient spoken Latin). Words of Greek origin are generally pronounced according to the same rules; native ancient Greek rules of stress are not used.

Generally in Latin each vowel or diphthong belongs to a single syllable. Classical Latin diphthongs are ae, au, and oe. Diphthongs from Greek can include oi, eu, ei, and ou, and ui also occasionally occurs in botanical Latin. Syllables end in vowels, unless there are multiple consonants, in which case the consonants are divided between the two syllables, with certain consonants being treated as pairs. In words of two syllables, the stress is on the first syllable. Words that contain three or more syllables have stresses accorded to their syllables by the quality and location of the different vowels in the words. In words of more than two syllables, the stress is on the penultimate syllable when the syllable contains a long vowel or diphthong, otherwise the stress is on the antepenultimate syllable.

Whether a vowel is long or short in a classical Latin word is a function of the vowel and its relationship to the consonants that precede or follow it. Modern Latin dictionaries and textbooks may contain diacritics called macrons for long vowels or breves for short vowels. Botanical Latin does not traditionally include macrons or breves, and they are prohibited (as diacritics) by the International Code of Nomenclature for algae, fungi, and plants (Article 60.6). Some books follow the mediaeval tradition to add an acute accent to mark the stressed syllable.

== Rules ==
To determine the position of the stress of Latin terms:

- Vowels followed by two consonants are generally stressed. Thus Po-ten-tíl-la, as the I is followed by a double L.
- Diphthongs are to be stressed, too. Thus Al-tháe-a, as AE is a diphthong.

== See also ==
- Traditional English pronunciation of Latin
- Latin regional pronunciation
