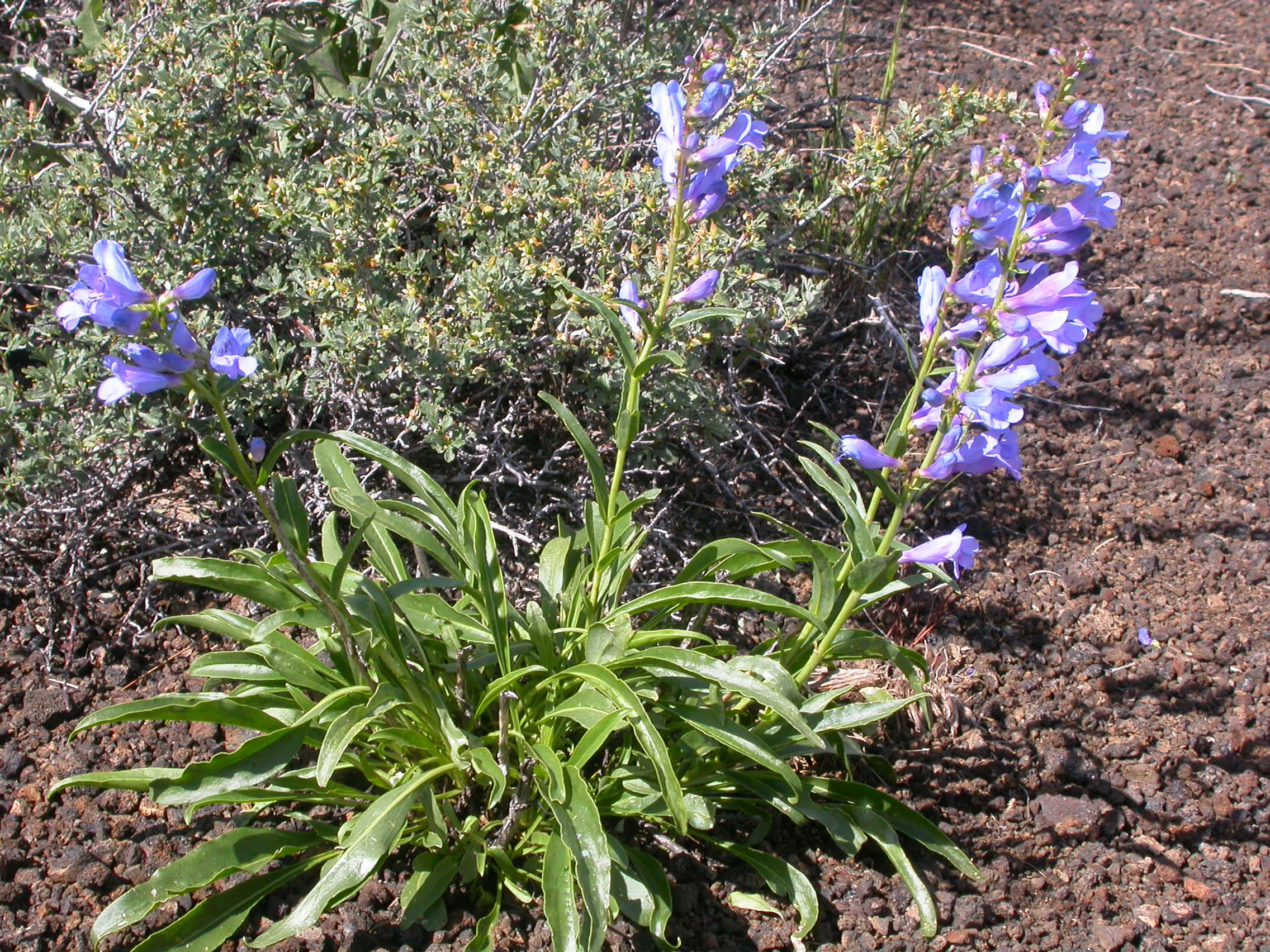
- Var. subglaber

Conservation status
- Apparently Secure (NatureServe)

Scientific classification
- Kingdom: Plantae
- Clade: Embryophytes
- Clade: Tracheophytes
- Clade: Angiosperms
- Clade: Eudicots
- Clade: Asterids
- Order: Lamiales
- Family: Plantaginaceae
- Genus: Penstemon
- Species: P. cyananthus

Binomial name
- Penstemon cyananthus Hook.

Varieties
- P. c. var. cyananthus; P. c. var. judyae; P. c. var. subglaber

Synonyms
- Penstemon holmgrenii

= Penstemon cyananthus =

Plant species in the veronica family

Penstemon cyananthus, commonly the Wasatch penstemon, is a species in the veronica family from the northern United States in the Rocky Mountains.

== Description ==
The flowering stems of Wasatch penstemons can vary from growing straight upwards to resting the ground with only upturned ends, reaching lengths of 5 to 90 centimeters (2–35.5 in), but usually not more than 70 cm (28 in). Each plant can have a few or just one stem, each sprouting from a caudex that is either thick or with a few short branches. The stems are usually hairless, but can be somewhat or even densely hairy, the hairs can make them look like they have been coated in ashes.

Plants will have both basal leaves and leaves attached to the stems, with the basal ones being very numerous. The texture might be leathery or not, but are never glaucous. The basal ones may also be densely hairy, but can be hairless like the rest of the leaves. The basal and lowest stem leaves are usually 4.5–16 centimeters (1.8–6.3 in), but rarely just 2 cm (0.8 in). Their width is typically 0.3–4 cm wide, but sometimes reaching 5.5 cm (2.2 in). They are obovate to oblanceolate in shape with smooth edges. Flowering stems will produce as many as six pairs of leaves, but can also have just one pair attached to opposite sides of the stem. Upper leaves are 1.6–10 cm (0.6–3.9 in) long and 0.5–6 cm wide with an ovate, oblanceolate, or lanceolate shape and a base directly attached to the main stem.

The flowers are blue to violet, often with the tube of the flower violet and the lobes at the opening blue.

== Taxonomy ==
The botanist William Jackson Hooker published the first scientific description of Penstemon cyananthus in 1849, placing the species in the Penstemon genus. However, Asa Gray published a description of it as a variety of Penstemon glaber in 1878 and Andreas Voss considered it to be a mere form of the same species. Hooker described it using plants grown at Kew Gardens from seed collected by Joseph Burke. The accepted classification of the Penstemon is as part of the Plantaginaceae family and Penstemon cyananthus has three accepted varieties.

- Penstemon cyananthus var. cyananthus – Native to Idaho, Utah, and Wyoming
- Penstemon cyananthus var. judyae – Endemic to Utah
- Penstemon cyananthus var. subglaber – Native to Idaho, Utah, Wyoming, and Montana

Penstemon cyananthus and variety subglaber each have two homotypic synonyms.

Table of Synonyms
Name	Year	Rank	Synonym of:	Notes
Penstemon fremontii var. subglaber A.Gray	1878	variety	var. subglaber	
Penstemon glaber var. cyananthus (Hook.) A.Gray	1862	variety	P. cyananthus	
Penstemon glaber f. cyananthus (Hook.) Voss	1894	form	P. cyananthus	
Penstemon holmgrenii S.L.Clark	1977	species	var. subglaber	without replaced synonym page.

=== Names ===
The species name, cyananthus, derives from "cyan", meaning blue. Penstemon cyananthus is known by the common names Wasatch penstemon or Wasatch beardtongue.

== Range and habitat ==
The range of the species starts in the Wasatch Range of northern Utah and extends northwards in the Rocky Mountains of Wyoming, Idaho, and Montana, with the species especially common in the Wasatches. In Utah the Natural Resources Conservation Service records of the species as far south as Emery County and grows in most of the counties north of there. Wasatch penstemon are only found in three of the westernmost counties of Wyoming, Uinta, Lincoln, and Teton, but is widespread in southern Idaho. No specific location is recorded for the species in Montana. It grows at elevations of 1,300 to 3,200 meters (4,300–10,500 ft).

It can be found growing amid sagebrush in the foothills and with Gambel oaks, aspen groves, and spruces higher up into the mountains. The species often is found in recently disturbed areas, including along road cuts.

== See also ==
List of Penstemon species
