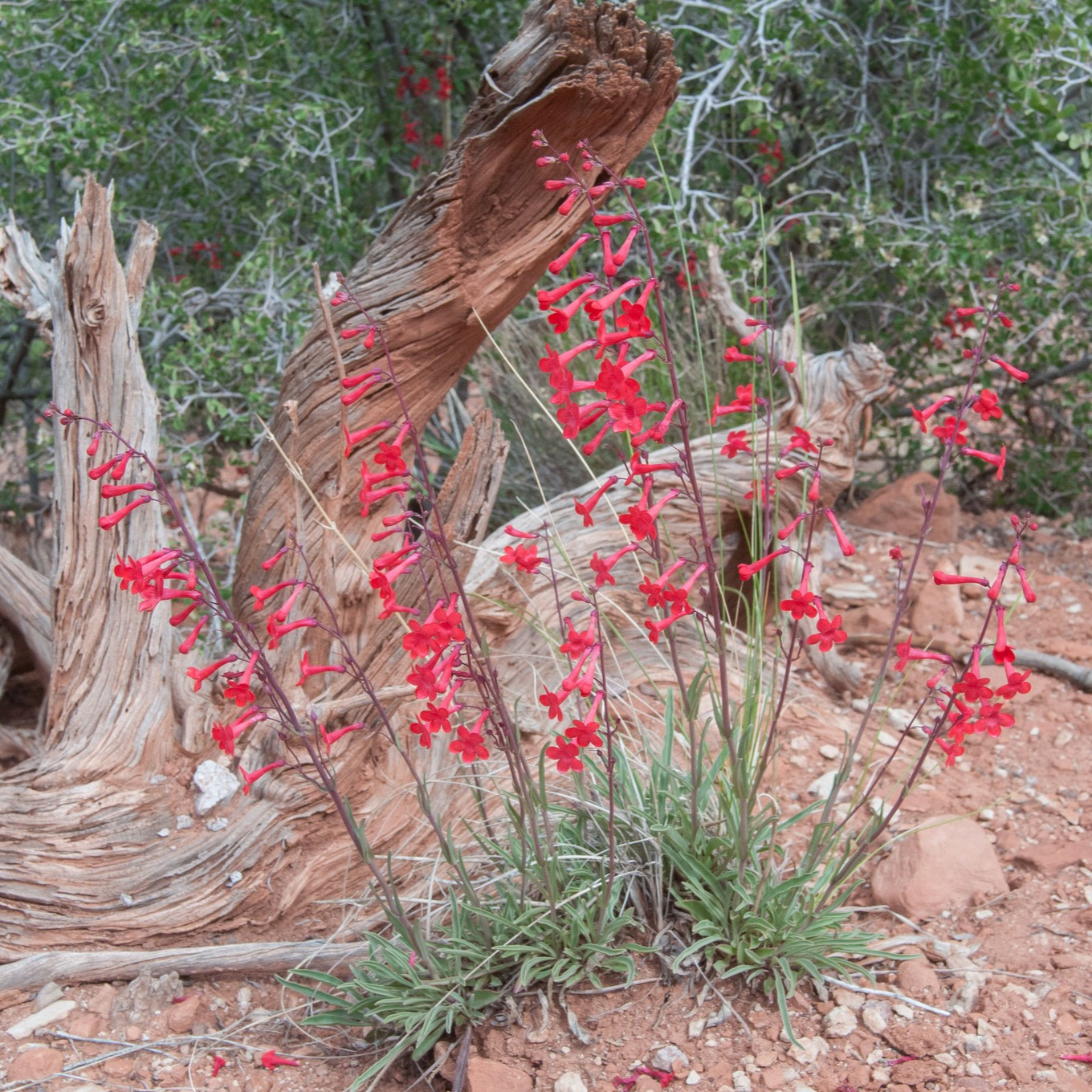
- In Zion National Park, Utah

Conservation status
- Apparently Secure (NatureServe)

Scientific classification
- Kingdom: Plantae
- Clade: Tracheophytes
- Clade: Angiosperms
- Clade: Eudicots
- Clade: Asterids
- Order: Lamiales
- Family: Plantaginaceae
- Genus: Penstemon
- Species: P. utahensis

Binomial name
- Penstemon utahensis Eastw.

Synonyms
- Penstemon eastwoodiae

= Penstemon utahensis =

Plant species in the veronica family

Penstemon utahensis, also called Utah penstemon or Utah firecracker, is a species of penstemon native to the southwestern United States, where it grows in scrub, woodland, and canyons. It is a perennial herb growing erect to a maximum height near half a meter. The thick leaves are located around the base of the plant and in opposite pairs along the stem. The upper leaves are narrow and often folded lengthwise, measuring up to 7.5 centimeters long. The showy inflorescence bears many bright red-pink flowers up to 2.5 centimeters in length. They have narrow floral tubes ending in wide, lobed mouths.

== Description ==
Utah penstemon is herbaceous plant with stems that grow straight upwards or outwards a short distance before curving to grow upwards to between 15 and 50 centimeters tall. All the stems are hairless and glaucous, covered in natural waxes giving a gray or blue cast to them. They often also have a redish tint and similar to other penstemon species may have a curve on the growing tip before it is fully mature. Each plant usually as a few stems which grow from a branched and woody caudex.

Plants have leaves that are thick and described as leathery or fleshy in texture and are often folded lengthwise. They have well developed basal leaves, the ones that grow directly from the base of the plant, and also cauline leaves attached to the stems. The leaves do not have teeth, but do sometimes have rough hairs along their edges or other leaf surfaces, though they can also be hairless. The basal leaves and the lowest leaves on stems are 3.5 to 10 cm long and 0.5 to 2 cm wide, though usually less than 8 cm long. They are oblanceolate, shaped like a spear head reversed with the widest part above the midpoint.

On the stems there are two to four leaf pairs attached to opposite sides. The upper leaves are sessile, attached directly to the stems without a petiole. They are 1.5–7.5 cm long and just 4–26 millimeters wide and normally elliptic to lanceolate in shape, though occasionally they are egg shaped. The end comes to a narrow point.

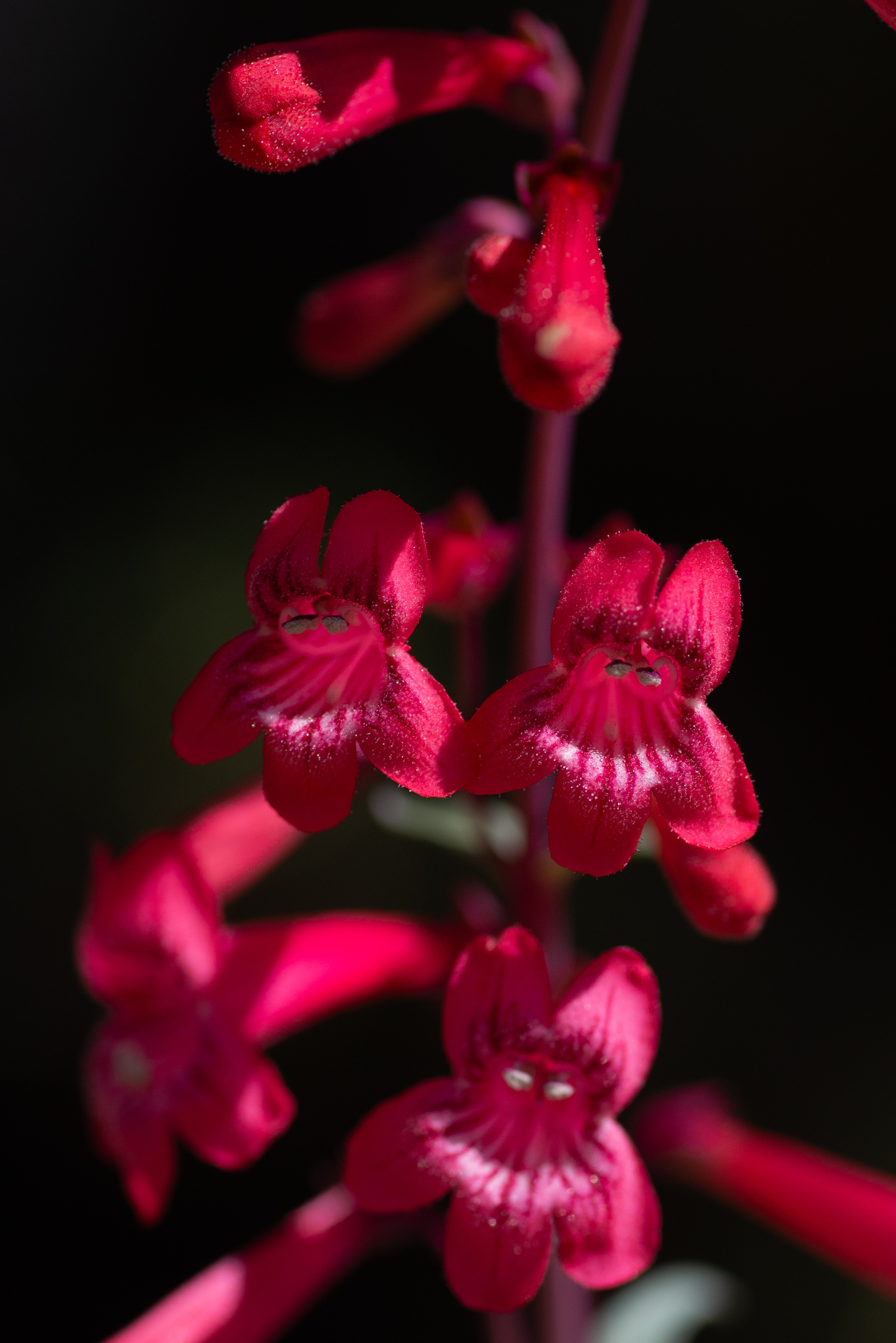
Inflorescence showing secund flowers with glandular hairs

The inflorescence is the top 11 to 25 cm of each stem. It will have three to fifteen groups of flowers, though more than eleven is unusual. Each group of flowers has two somewhat separated from each other, though this varies. Each group has two sub-groups of flowers called a cyme, usually with one to three flowers, but sometimes as many as five attached to one point. The flowers are more or less secund, facing in one direction away from the stem.

Utah penstemons have flowers that are most often true red to crimson; rarely they can be deep pink or a pink-purple. They are tubular-salverform, having a narrow tube that opens to petal-like lobes, the five widely spreading lobes are nearly equal in size, the flowers only slightly bilabiate or two-lipped. Rather than being completely at right angles to the tube the face has the lower ones slightly projecting and the upper ones pushed slightly backwards. Usually a forward pointing lower lip is a landing platform for insects and its retention in a hummingbird pollinated red penstemon is unusual. Overall the corolla can measure 17 to 25 mm, but rarely longer than 22 mm. The outsides of the flowers are covered in glandular hairs, especially towards the ends, and also on the insides of the floral tubes. Rather than hanging downwards from the stems they stand out at nearly right angles to the stem.

The stamens and the infertile staminode do not extend out of the flower's mouth. The staminode is 7–10 mm and usually hairless, but can covered in yellow papillate, nipple like, hairs towards the end.

The blooming season can start as early as April but may be as late as June in its native habitat. The fruit is a capsule 7–10 mm long and 5–7 mm wide. The seeds are just 3–3.5 mm.

== Taxonomy ==
Penstemon utahensis was named and scientifically described by Alice Eastwood in 1893. It is in the genus Penstemon as part of the Plantaginaceae family. It has no subspecies and has just one synonym, Penstemon eastwoodiae described by Amos Arthur Heller in 1900. He created this synonym under the mistaken belief that Penstemon utahensis (S.Watson) A.Nelson, a synonym of Penstemon subglaber published in 1899, made this an invalid name and that a replacement would be needed.

=== Names ===
The species name for Penstemon utahensis means "of Utah" in Botanical Latin. It is known by the common names Utah penstemon, Utah firecracker, Utah bugler, and Utah beardtongue, although its range extends far outside that state. It is called Utah firecracker because of the bright scarlet red of the flowers.

== Range and habitat ==
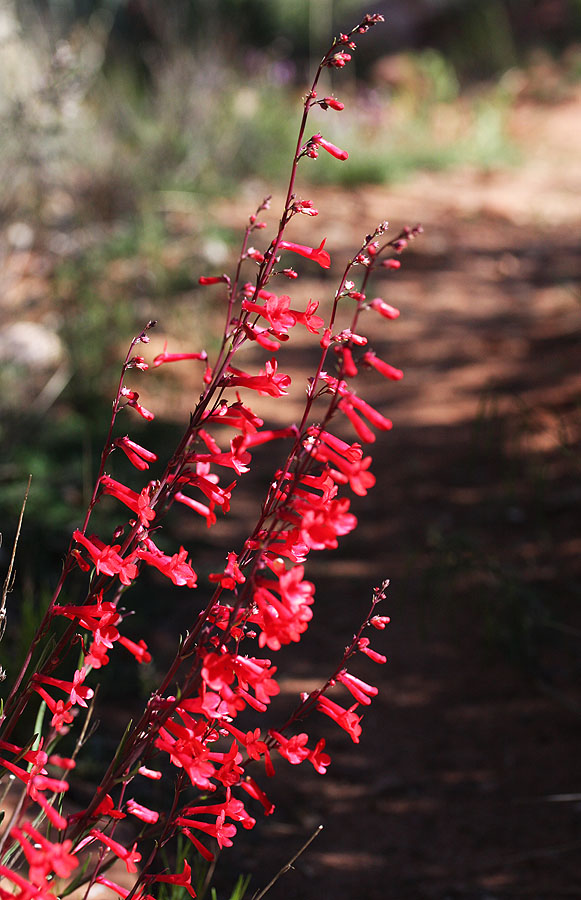
Utah Penstemon (Penstemon utahensis) Flower Racemes, Zion National Park, April 2016

The Utah penstemon is native to five western states, California, Arizona, Nevada, Utah, and Colorado. In these states it largely grows in the Colorado River basin, extending into the deserts of southern California only as far west as the Kingston Range and New York Mountains. In Arizona it can be found in Mohave, Coconino, and Navajo counties. In the Grand Canyon it grows at higher elevations the Supai Formation up to the rim. It is also recorded in the three southern counties of Nevada, Nye, Lincoln, and Clark. To the east it grows in southwest Utah and throughout the Canyon Lands into western Colorado. In Colorado the only records of the plant are near the boarder with Utah in Mesa and Montezuma counties. It can be found at elevations of 400–2,500 meters (1,300–8,200 ft).

They grow in sagebrush steppes, pinyon–juniper woodlands, in blackbush scrub, in desert scrublands, and with junipers alone. They are often associated with soils derived from sandstone.

=== Conservation ===
When evaluated by NatureServe in 1984 the species was rated apparently secure (G4) at the global level. However, it was rated as vulnerable in Nevada (S3), and imperiled (S2) in California and Colorado. It was not rated in Utah or Arizona.

== Cultivation ==
It has a reputation for being a difficult species to keep in a garden among penstemon enthusiasts, though valued for its showy red flowers. Its seeds require cool, moist stratification for eight weeks for sprouting.

== See also ==
- List of Penstemon species
