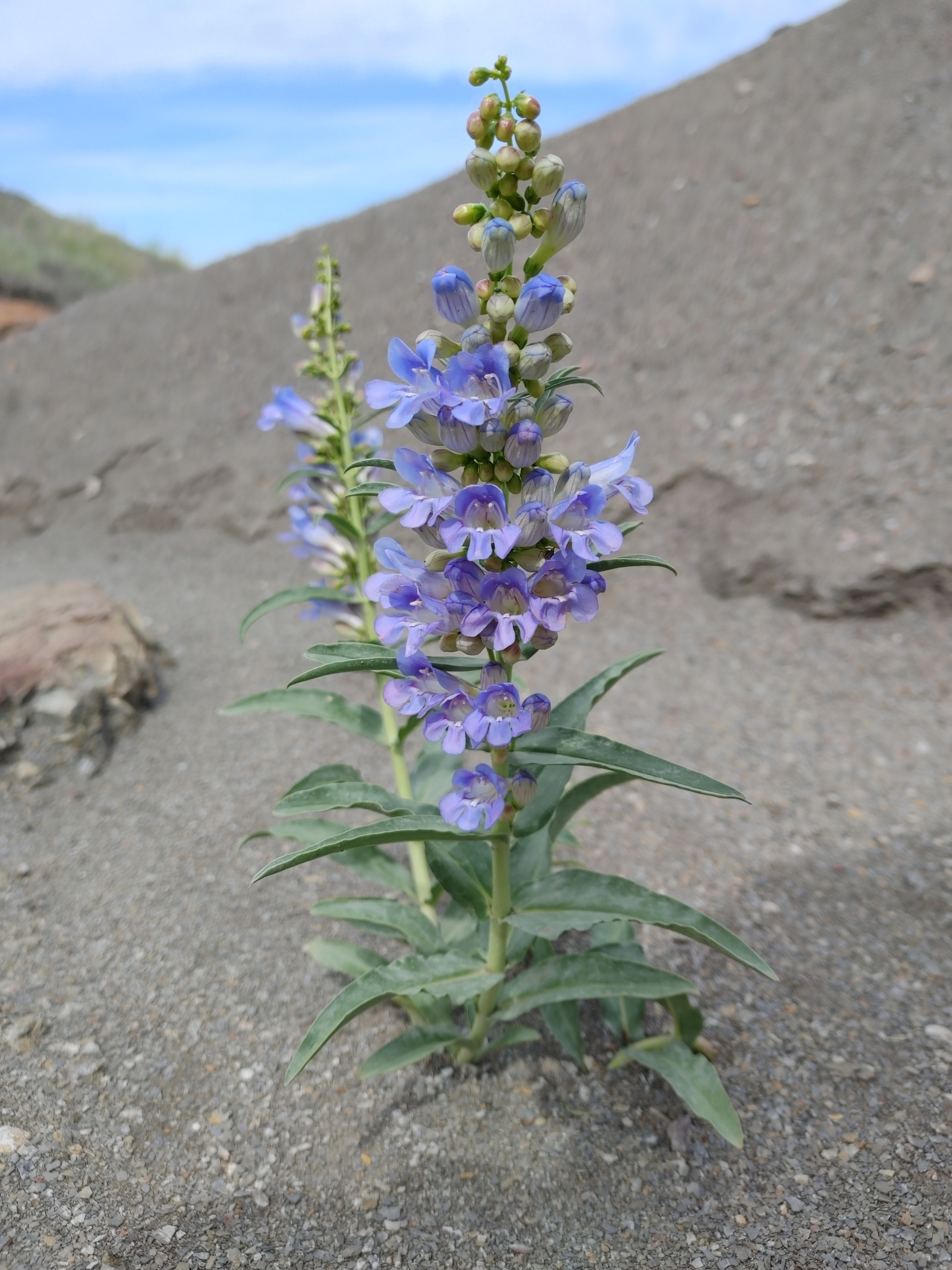
- Blooming in Buffalo Gap National Grassland, South Dakota

Conservation status
- Secure (NatureServe)

Scientific classification
- Kingdom: Plantae
- Clade: Tracheophytes
- Clade: Angiosperms
- Clade: Eudicots
- Clade: Asterids
- Order: Lamiales
- Family: Plantaginaceae
- Genus: Penstemon
- Species: P. glaber

Binomial name
- Penstemon glaber Pursh

Varieties
- P. glaber var. alpinus; P. glaber var. brandegeei; P. glaber var. glaber

Synonyms
- List: Chelone alpina; Penstemon alpinus; Penstemon brandegeei; Penstemon gordonianus; Penstemon gordonii; Penstemon magnus; Penstemon oreophilus; Penstemon riparius

= Penstemon glaber =

Plant species in the Plantaginaceae family

Penstemon glaber, commonly known as sawsepal penstemon, is a species in the Plantaginaceae family from western North America. It grows as far north as Montana and North Dakota and as far south as Chihuahua in northern Mexico.

== Description ==
Penstemon glaber is a herbaceous plant with stems that may be 10 to 80 centimeters (4 to 31 in) tall, but that are more usually 50–65 cm (20–26 in). Its stems and leaves are hairless to puberulent or pubescent, having fine, short, usually erect, hairs or being fully covered with hairs. They are not glaucous. Its roots are woody and fibrous.

The leaves of Penstemon glaber are attached to both the base of the plant and its stems, though at times plants can be missing or have many fewer or smaller basal leaves. All of its leaves have smooth edges. The lower cauline and basal leaves have lower ends that taper to a petiole, a leaf stem. They measure 2 to 15.5 centimeters long by 0.5 to 4.5 cm wide, but they are usually less than 8 cm long and 2 cm wide. They are obovate, oblanceolate, or lanceolate in shape; like a reversed teardrop, a reversed spear head with the wider portion past the midpoint, or like a spearhead with the widest part nearer the base. The point may be blunt or pointed, occasionally with a mucronate end where the central leaf vein extends beyond the leaf blade.

The leaves further up the stems are sessile, attached directly to the main stem without a petiole, with two to eight pairs of leaves attached on opposite sides of each stem. The upper leaves have a length of 2.7 to 15 cm and are lanceolate in shape with a wide obtuse point or a narrow acute one. Their bases may be cordate, having heart lobes or ears that wrap around the stem, or they can simply be squared off.

The upper part of each stem is an inflorescence 3 to 30 centimeters long that is secund, with all the flowers facing one direction. The flowers are in three to twelve groups growing from nodes with egg shaped to lanceolate bracts immediately under them. In each node there are two cymes, branched flower stems, each with two to four flowers. The flowers have sepals that are fused with five lobes surrounding the base of the floral tube that have edges that are erose, having an uneven edge as if it were nibbled away. Flower colors vary from plant to plant, purple, blue-purple, or even rich turquoise blue, though on some plants flower buds blush pink. Inside of the flower's tube the color is paler, but with dark red-purple nectar guides. Each flower is moderately bilabiate, two lipped, with two lobes on the upper lip and three on the lower. The length of the flower is 24–48 millimeters with a diameter of 8–18 mm. The longer pair of stamens can just reach the opening of the flower, but usually all the stamens are contained inside the floral tube. The staminode, the sterile modified stamen, is sparsely covered in woolly hairs that are pale-yellow and as long as 1.5 mm. Its length of 15 to 22 mm means that it can extend slightly beyond the flower's mouth or be entirely contained like the stamens.

The fruit is a capsule 10–17 mm long and 5–8 mm wide.

== Taxonomy ==
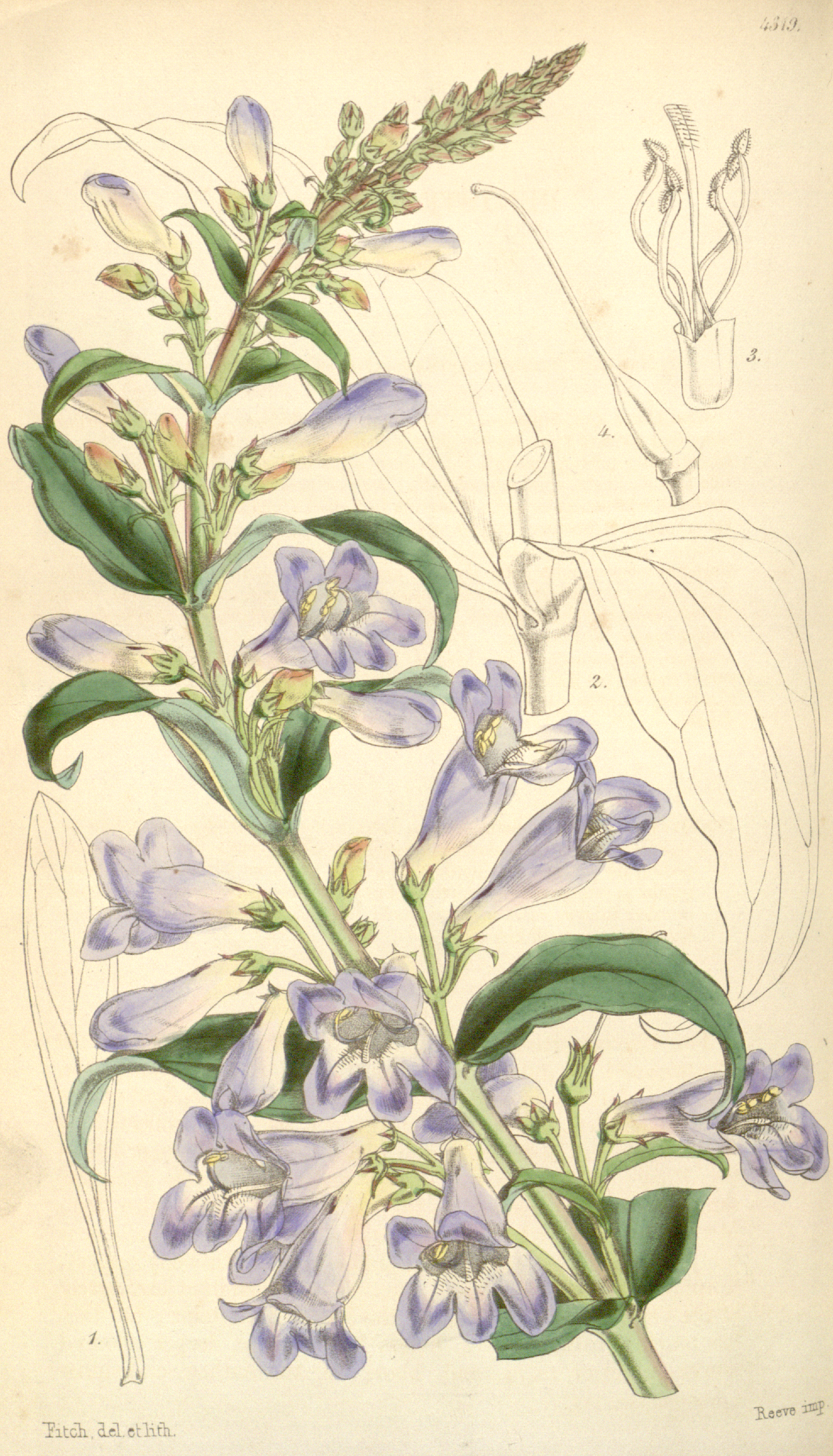
As illustrated in Curtis's Botanical Magazine, 1847

Penstemon glaber was scientifically described and named by Frederick Traugott Pursh in 1813. DNA analysis indicates that it is closely related to Penstemon comarrhenus. It is a member of the Penstemon genus in the family Plantaginaceae.

=== Varieties ===
The species has three recognized varieties according to Plants of the World Online.

==== Penstemon glaber var. alpinus ====
This variety was scientifically described by John Torrey in 1824 as a species named Penstemon alpinus. In 1862 the botanist Asa Gray described it as a variety of P. glaber. However, as recently as 2003 sources continued to recognize it as a species. It grows in the Rocky Mountains and their foothills from Wyoming to New Mexico and also in the adjacent shortgrass prairies as far east as Nebraska. It grows at elevations from 1,500 to 2,900 meters (4,900 to 9,500 ft). Blooming starts as early as June but may be as late as September, but usually not past August.

==== Penstemon glaber var. brandegeei ====
In 1874 Thomas Conrad Porter described this as a variety of Penstemon cyananthus. After this it was described as a species by Per Axel Rydberg in 1900 and then as a variety of Penstemon alpinus by Charles William Theodore Penland in 1954, before finally being recognized as a variety of P. glaber by Craig Carl Freeman in 1986. However, as with var. alpinus it continued to be treated as a separate species in sources into the 2000s. It is native to Colorado and New Mexico in the United States and to Chihuahua in Mexico. It grows in sandy or rocky areas of mountains and foothills. Blooming can happen as early as June or as late as August.

==== Penstemon glaber var. glaber ====
The autonymic variety is primarily distinguished from the other varieties by having much shorter lobes on its sepals on average, just 2–4.8 mm in length, but also by having rounded or tapering tips that are short and end abruptly. It is the more northerly of the varieties with a native habitat extending northward from Wyoming and Nebraska into Montana and the Dakotas. It grows at elevations from 1,100 to 2,200 meters (3,600 to 7,200 ft). Blooming can occur as early as July or as late as September, but as with var. alpinus, usually not past August.

=== Synonyms ===
Penstemon glaber has 14 synonyms of its three varieties.

Table of Synonyms
| Name | Year | Rank | Synonym of: | Notes |
|---|---|---|---|---|
| Chelone alpina Spreng. | 1827 | species | var. alpinus | = het. |
| Penstemon alpinus Torr. | 1824 | species | var. alpinus | ≡ hom. |
| Penstemon alpinus subsp. brandegeei (Porter) Penland | 1954 | subspecies | var. brandegeei | ≡ hom. |
| Penstemon alpinus subsp. magnus (Pennell) Penland | 1954 | subspecies | var. alpinus | = het. |
| Penstemon alpinus f. riparius (A.Nelson) Pennell | 1920 | form | var. glaber | = het. |
| Penstemon brandegeei (Porter) Rydb. | 1900 | species | var. brandegeei | ≡ hom. |
| Penstemon cyananthus var. brandegeei Porter | 1874 | variety | var. brandegeei | ≡ hom. |
| Penstemon glaber var. occidentalis A.Gray | 1862 | variety | var. glaber | = het. |
| Penstemon glaber var. stenosepalus Regel | 1875 | variety | var. glaber | = het. |
| Penstemon gordonianus A.Gray | 1860 | species | var. glaber | = het., orth. var. |
| Penstemon gordonii Hook. | 1847 | species | var. glaber | = het. |
| Penstemon magnus Pennell | 1920 | species | var. alpinus | = het. |
| Penstemon oreophilus Rydb. | 1905 | species | var. alpinus | = het. |
| Penstemon riparius A.Nelson | 1898 | species | var. glaber | = het. |
Notes: ≡ homotypic synonym; = heterotypic synonym

=== Names ===
The species name, glaber, means smooth, a reference to the hairless stems of the autonymic variety, with the same root as the botanical term glabrous. The common name sawsepal penstemon comes from the saw-toothed sepal lobes found at the base of the flowers. It is also known as smooth penstemon or smooth beardtongue, but it shares these names with other penstemon species like Penstemon digitalis. Similarly is it also called the blue penstemon, but it shares this name with Penstemon laetus and Penstemon cyaneus. Rarely, it is called Pikes Peak penstemon because of a very early collection of the species on Pikes Peak, the first collection of variety alpinus.

== Range and habitat ==
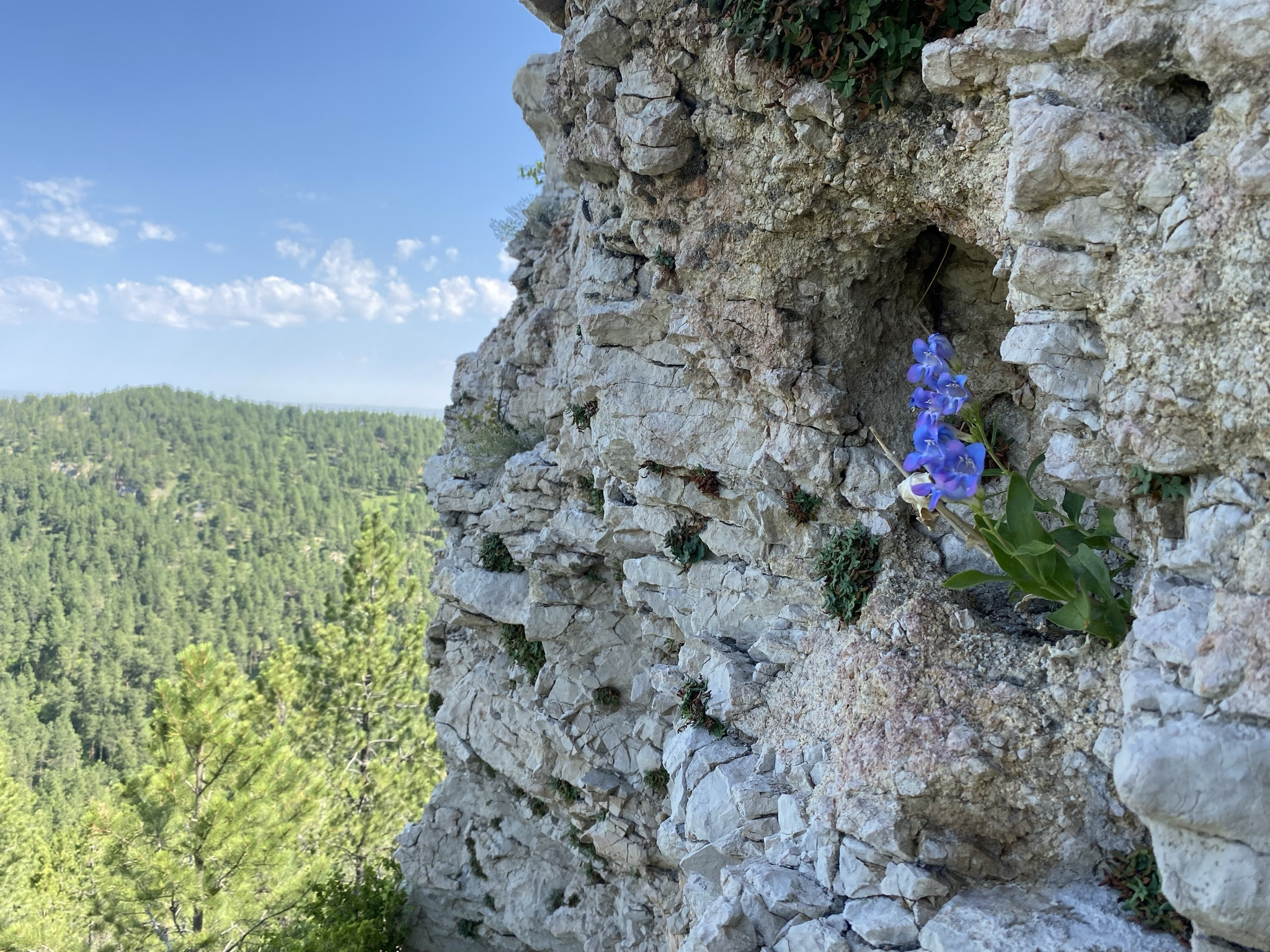
Penstemon glaber blooming in a rocky pocket on a cliff face, Black Hills National Forest, South Dakota

Sawsepal penstemon grows across many North American states from northern Mexico to the northern United States along the Rocky Mountains. In Mexico it only grows in the state of Chihuahua. In New Mexico it grows in northern parts of the state from Union County to McKinley County. In Colorado it primarily grows east of the Continental Divide in the mountains and the counties at the foot of the mountains. In Wyoming it grows throughout all but the southwestern corner of the state, but is only found in the western panhandle of Nebraska. It is primarily found in western South Dakota and only in a few scattered counties in North Dakota and Montana.

== Ecology ==
The pollen wasp Pseudomasaris vespoides which is presumed to specialize in the collection of pollen from Penstemon species has been collected from sawsepal penstemons.

=== Conservation ===
Penstemon glaber was evaluated by NatureServe in 1988 and rated as secure (G5) at the global level. Both alpinus and glaber were rated as apparently secure varieties (T4) in 2000. However, variety brandegeei is rated as vulnerable (T3).

== Cultivation ==
Sawsepal penstemon is among the more popular penstemon species grown in gardens both inside and beyond its native range. Both the alpinus and brandegeei varieties are specifically noted for being long-lived. When found at high elevations plants are quite small and dainty and seeds from these populations at or above timberline will produce small plants, though not so small as in the wild. It tends to be larger in gardens, with brandegeei, being particularly noted for having a larger basket like form with many stems in contrast to the one to three stems on wild plants. Over watering or high rainfall can lead to sprawling plants with pale flower color. Plants are hardy down to −20 °C (−4 °F) and lower temperatures when kept drier.

== See also ==
- List of Penstemon species
