= Knobstone Trail =

Long-distance hiking trail in Indiana

- Length: 58 mi (93 km)
- Location: Clark / Scott / Washington counties, Indiana, USA
- Trailheads: Deam Lake; Delaney Park
- Use: Hiking
- Highest point: Round Knob, 1,000 ft (300 m)
- Difficulty: Moderate to Strenuous

The Knobstone Trail is the longest hiking trail in Indiana. Its southern terminus is about 15 miles (24 km) north of Louisville, Kentucky in the Deam Lake State Recreation Area. It currently ends at Delaney Creek Park near Salem, Indiana. However, there are plans to eventually extend the trail another 80 miles (129 km) north to Martinsville, Indiana. Most of the trail lies within Clark State Forest. As it lies along the Knobstone Escarpment, it is a difficult hike, which is why many use the Knobstone Trail to prepare for hiking the Appalachian Trail.

The trail was first established in 1980, and was only 32 miles (51 km) long. It now runs 58 miles (93 km), mostly through public forest.

Hiking the trail in its entirety results in approximately 20,000 feet (6,100 m) of elevation change between the gains and losses. The trail passes through 3 counties and is surrounded by approximately 40,000 acres (160 km^{2}) of Indiana State Forest. The rugged trail consists of steep climbs and descents throughout its duration. It is maintained to backcountry standards. There are several established backcountry campsites along the length of the Knobstone Trail, often sitting adjacent to the path. These campsites are typically small and the only amenity included is a stone fire ring.

After a tornado on March 2, 2012, destroyed 4.5 miles of the trail, sections of the trail were closed. The damaged areas were reopened in early 2014.

== Waypoints ==
Following are waypoints on the trail:

Waypoint Mile #	Coordinates
Waypoint 0	38°27′54″N 85°50′37″W
Waypoint 1	38°28′35″N 85°50′50″W
Waypoint 2	38°29′13″N 85°50′59″W
Waypoint 3	38°29′49″N 85°51′06″W
Waypoint 4	38°30′19″N 85°51′43″W
Waypoint 5	38°30′42″N 85°51′55″W
Waypoint 6	38°31′09″N 85°51′36″W
Waypoint 7	38°31′49″N 85°51′21″W
Waypoint 8	38°31′46″N 85°50′28″W
Waypoint 9	38°32′23″N 85°50′24″W
Waypoint 10	38°32′51″N 85°49′55″W
Waypoint 11	38°33′28″N 85°50′06″W
Waypoint 12	38°33′58″N 85°49′39″W
Waypoint 13	38°34′01″N 85°50′29″W
Waypoint 14	38°34′28″N 85°50′41″W
Waypoint 15	38°34′56″N 85°50′50″W
Waypoint 16	38°34′44″N 85°51′42″W
Waypoint 17	38°34′44″N 85°52′27″W
Waypoint 18	38°35′09″N 85°53′01″W
Waypoint 19	38°35′54″N 85°53′16″W
Waypoint 20	38°36′22″N 85°53′07″W
Waypoint 21	38°36′43″N 85°52′50″W
Waypoint 22	38°37′14″N 85°52′43″W
Waypoint 23	38°37′52″N 85°52′32″W
Waypoint 24	38°38′26″N 85°52′48″W
Waypoint 25	38°38′44″N 85°53′12″W
Waypoint 26	38°39′15″N 85°53′30″W
Waypoint 27	38°39′11″N 85°54′10″W
Waypoint 28	38°38′52″N 85°54′38″W
Waypoint 29	38°38′56″N 85°55′23″W
Waypoint 30	38°38′47″N 85°56′06″W
Waypoint 31	38°38′47″N 85°56′50″W
Waypoint 32	38°38′52″N 85°57′29″W
Waypoint 33	38°39′00″N 85°58′10″W
Waypoint 34	38°39′35″N 85°58′08″W
Waypoint 35	38°39′46″N 85°58′41″W
Waypoint 36	38°40′17″N 85°58′19″W
Waypoint 37	38°40′56″N 85°58′25″W
Waypoint 38	38°41′19″N 85°58′54″W
Waypoint 39	38°41′58″N 85°58′58″W
Waypoint 40	38°42′03″N 85°59′42″W
Waypoint 41	38°42′11″N 86°00′24″W
Waypoint 42	38°42′21″N 86°01′25″W
Waypoint 43	38°42′32″N 86°02′16″W
Waypoint 44	38°42′50″N 86°01′52″W
Waypoint 45	38°43′12″N 86°01′52″W
Waypoint 46	38°43′27″N 86°01′58″W
