= Boyle Park =

Park in Little Rock, Arkansas

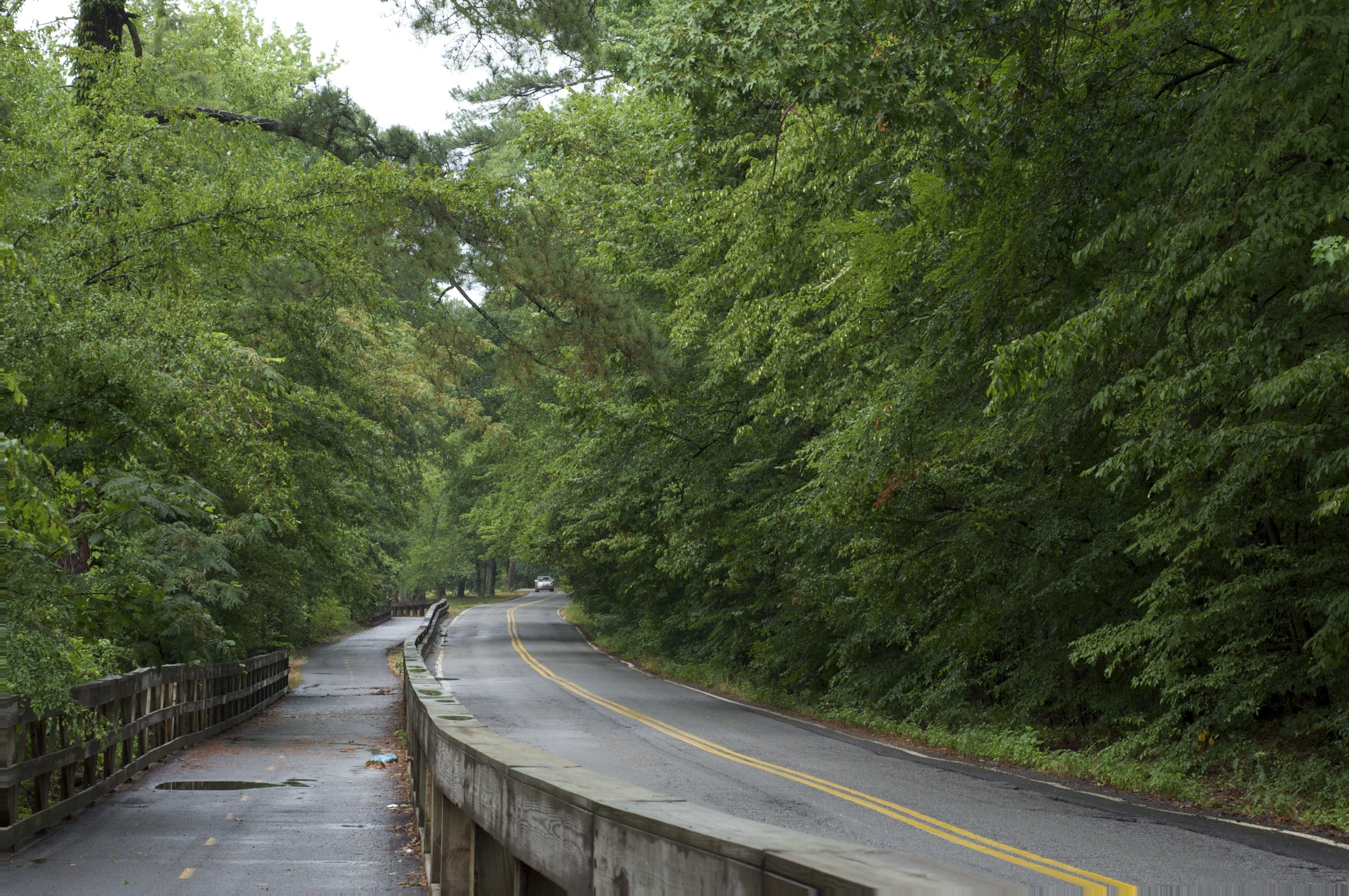
- Interactive map of Boyle Park
- Type: Urban park
- Location: Little Rock in Arkansas, United States
- Coordinates: 34°43′35″N 92°21′21″W
- Area: 250 acres (100 ha)
- Created: 1926
- Operator: Little Rock Parks and Recreation
- Status: Open all year
- Boyle Park
- U.S. National Register of Historic Places
- Architect: Civilian Conservation Corps
- NRHP reference No.: 95001119
- Added to NRHP: September 22, 1995

Boyle Park is an approximately 250 acre urban park located in west-central Little Rock. The land for Boyle Park was donated to the City of Little Rock in 1929 by Dr. John F. Boyle. It was added to the National Register of Historic Places in 1995 for the eight known intact examples of Civilian Conservation Corps rustic architecture.

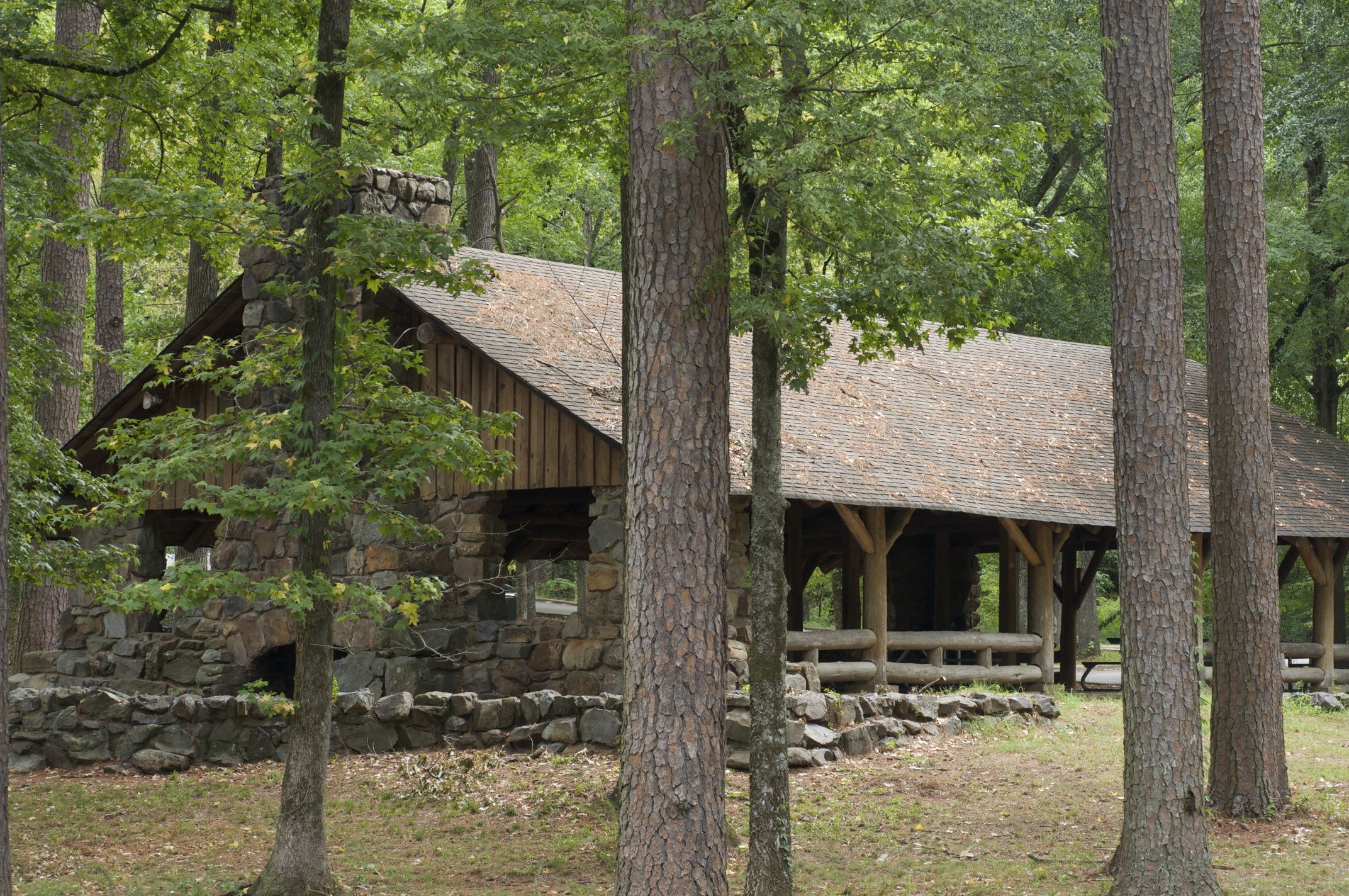
One of the original Civilian Conservation Corps pavilions in the park

The park is mostly unimproved woodland. However, the park contains a small wildlife pond, two playgrounds, three pavilions, one gazebo, open meadows, woods, and numerous hiking and biking trails. Rock Creek flows through the park.
