= Charles C. Deam =

American forester and botanist

- Born: August 30, 1865; Wells County, Indiana
- Died: May 29, 1953 (aged 87); Bluffton, Indiana
- Occupations: pharmacist, small business owner surveyor, botanist, American conservationist, forester
- Spouse: Stella Mullin
- Children: Roberta Ortenburger
- Parent(s): John Henry Deam and Martha Marsh

Charles Clemon Deam (August 30, 1865 – May 29, 1953) was the first state forester of Indiana. His interest in botany began at a young age and grew to include categorization and sustainable practices. He discovered 25 new species, 48 plants are named after him and his herbarium includes 78,000 specimens, still preserved at IU Bloomington.

== Early life ==
Charles C. Deam was born on August 30, 1865, on his family farm near Bluffton in Wells County, Indiana. Growing up on a farm, he learned the value of hard work. He earned money through odd jobs such as building fences for another farmer. He spent his savings on a poem book by Henry Wadsworth Longfellow. A young Deam was always curious and collected Indian relics he found on the farm. Deam's other interests included the natural world, something his father showed him through farm produce, garden plants, and herbal remedies. When he was sixteen, he became deathly ill from typhoid fever. He received a herbal remedy of milk and old field balsams or cudweed to gradually nurse him back to good health. His mother, also sick, died despite the medicine.

After graduating from high school, he went into teaching at a country school. Unimpressed, he decided to look elsewhere for work. Deam possessed a restless mind, great energy, and a tendency to assert order in his world. He attended DePauw University in the fall of 1885 until his money ran out in 1887. He soon sold his books and returned home, where he worked odd jobs.

In 1888, Deam began maintaining a store in Marion where he worked upwards of 110 hours a week. His hard work led to a better job in Kokomo, but Deam considered it a step backward in his career. After complaining, a store supplier took note and helped him purchase a dilapidated drugstore in Bluffton in May 1891. It was the norm for druggists in this period to make their own cures, thus birthing Deam's Nerve and Bone Liniment. This medicine claimed to cure aches and pains among men and beasts. As a business owner, he continued to work long hours to exhaustion. One day in 1892, he got angry at a woman and she left upset. A perfume salesman in the store spoke to Deam, stating that he should see a doctor. Deam followed this advice and saw a doctor who recommended taking a half-hour walk daily, which he began doing. During the walks, he studied his surroundings, growing his interest in botany.

In June 1893, he married a red-headed school teacher named Stella Mullin. They shared similar values of education and progress. She often accompanied Deam on his nature walks. During this time, Deam studied plant life more intensively and discussed botany.

== Botanist ==
In 1896, Deam met Edward Bruce Williamson, a zoologist, who taught him about the scientific method. His love of plants grew, and his interest in taxonomy started. Soon, he was collecting plants along lanes and meadows during his hikes, but could not identify many of them. Williamson loaned him Gray's Manual of Botany, starting his interest in mounting plants. The first plant he mounted was a small snapdragon hung in September 1896 called Ilysanthes dubia. Williamson also influenced Deam by his discussion on becoming published. Eventually, he was introduced to the Indiana Academy of Sciences (IAS) in 1899 by Williamson. The organization focused on gathering scientific minds within Indiana to share their knowledge. Their journal, Proceedings, featured Deam's first botany article, and soon he began to do an annual report on “Plants Rare or New in Indiana”.

By 1897, Deam obtained a botanical library and began working with other botanists, like Stanley and John Merle Coulter who wrote Forest Trees of Indiana in 1891.

Deam's focus on plant identification, migration and growth was more than just for collecting, focusing on understanding the subtle changes in the environment. One instance is when he noticed that Hibiscus militaris was becoming prevalent, something he attributed to poor land management. He wrote:

“I have known the shores of the Wabash River near Bluffton … since 1880. In the early history of our state our streams were clear. But when the forests were removed, the streams became muddy and sediment was deposited on the shores and on the gravely and rocky bars which made suitable habitat for this species. The same is true of other plants, some of which now clog some of our smaller streams.”

=== Field work ===
In 1910, Deam began to focus more on plants native to Indiana, particularly vascular plants. He continued to collect plants by walking, but soon used a horse and carriage, bicycle, motorcycle, and in 1915, a Ford Model-T touring car. He customized the car with an ash frame to sleep two and added a canvas tarp to block the rain, naming it the Weed Wagon. During their often day-long adventures, Deam and his assistant (at one time Ralph Wilcox) cruised rural roads looking for new plants. Once they found a specimen, the plants were laid on newsprint for a plant press to compress and dry. On the newsprint they noted the plant's name, the habitat and gave each sample a serial number, later recording it in a specimen log. The Weed Wagon allowed Deam to go from collecting around 1,200 specimens a year to 3,760 in 1916, a year after its purchase.

His ventures into the Indiana Brush are noted by Indiana University botanist Paul Weatherwax. He discussed that despite Deam doubting himself, he always worked through the day and often went were his fellow botanists would not. Through his trips, he collected detailed knowledge on Indiana's plant life, and in 1911, he published his first book titled Trees of Indiana. It was so successful that copies sold out and required reprinting on several occasions. Deam's Shrubs of Indiana (1924) included numerous pictures from specimens at his herbarium and identification keys. His third book, Grasses of Indiana (1929), garnered attraction due to its ink drawings, his ability to translate scientific knowledge to the average reader, and folklore on certain plants, like Kentucky Bluegrass. His final work, Flora of Indiana, took him eight years to complete, from 1932 to 1940. Weatherwax spoke of Deam's published efforts as:

"...of critical significance to plant taxonomy and ecology in Indiana and the entire Midwest. Great natural areas of the native vegetation were yielding to axe, plow, fire, and drainage; and a host of migrant species were coming in by way of railroads, highways, and agricultural practices. Deam's particular service was to leave an accurate and detailed record of what plants were here and what was happening to them."

His work as a botanist led to the discovery of 25 new species and 48 plants are named after him. One example is the Deam Oak, a natural hybrid discovered in Wells County by Williamson. In addition, his collection efforts amounted to 78,000 plants throughout his career, documented in his herbarium.

== Forester ==
Indiana experienced 70 years of deforestation, beginning in 1830. By 1900, only 7% of Indiana's forests remained, compared to the height frontier settlers saw of 87%. Deam was one of few people who cared. Considered the father of Indiana forestry, he contributed notably to sustainable development. The loss of trees affected soil erosion on plots with many new farms and lumber operations.

This dramatic change led to more focus on Indiana's forests. In 1901 the Indiana legislature passed House Bill 192, establishing the Indiana State Board of Forestry. Governor Winfield Durbin signed the bill into law. Deam was appointed State Forester in 1909. As part of his job, he moved to Clark State Forest in Clark County. He remained there until 1913, taking a hiatus due to his dislike of political inquiries and campaign contributions. This was when Samuel M. Ralston was elected governor. He resumed the position in 1917 with the election of James P. Goodrich. The State Board of Forestry became the Department of Conservation in 1919, headed by Richard Lieber. In 1926, Deam noticed how many younger men received training in forestry. In 1928, at the age of 63, he retired from state forester to concentrate on publishing, only to be rehired as a state forestry researcher later on. Ultimately, this allowed him to invest more time into his books and revisions.

In 1903, the State Board of Forestry purchased 2,028 acres (8.21 km2) of worn land in Clark County near Henryville, Indiana, adding to state forests under Deam's direction. Deam investigated which species were suitable for reforestation, concluding that the poor soil supported conifers and pines best, leading to much of Indiana's new forests populated by conifers. After forestry management, Deam focused on educating farmers and developing educational material to promote woodland management. Previously, farmers were taxed based on land they did and did not farm, and conservation laws before 1905 encouraged farmers to maintain farmland. Deam attempted to rectify this with a bill, the Forest Tax Classification Act, in 1921. It intended to give farmers who agreed to protect forests on their land from fire and grazing a tax break. A total of 400,000 acres are now enrolled and protected due to the bill.

== Death ==
Deam remained active late in his life, but was increasingly exhausted. On May 29, 1953, Deam died at age eighty-seven, a few months after his wife.

== Legacy ==
Deam's work was honored by both the United States government and the state of Indiana. In 1947, he was awarded the Mary Soper Pope Memorial Award in botany. He traveled through all 1016 townships in Indiana, discovered 25 new plants and has 48 plants named for him. Charles C. Deam died on May 29, 1953.

His legacy continues on with two protected areas. Charles C. Deam Wilderness, part of the Hoosier National Forest and Deam Lake State Recreation Area, an Indiana state park named after him. Deam's herbarium collection of 78,000 plants is now housed at Indiana University in Bloomington, one of the largest private collections of plants in the state. Furthermore, the work he and his associates contributed led to better sustainability practices. In 1900, 1.5 million acres were wooded in Indiana. That number is currently 4.5 million with timber harvesters planting more than they use.

== Published works ==
Charles Deam wrote four books about plants in Indiana.

Trees of Indiana - 1911
Shrubs of Indiana - 1924
Grasses of Indiana - 1929
Flora of Indiana - 1940
