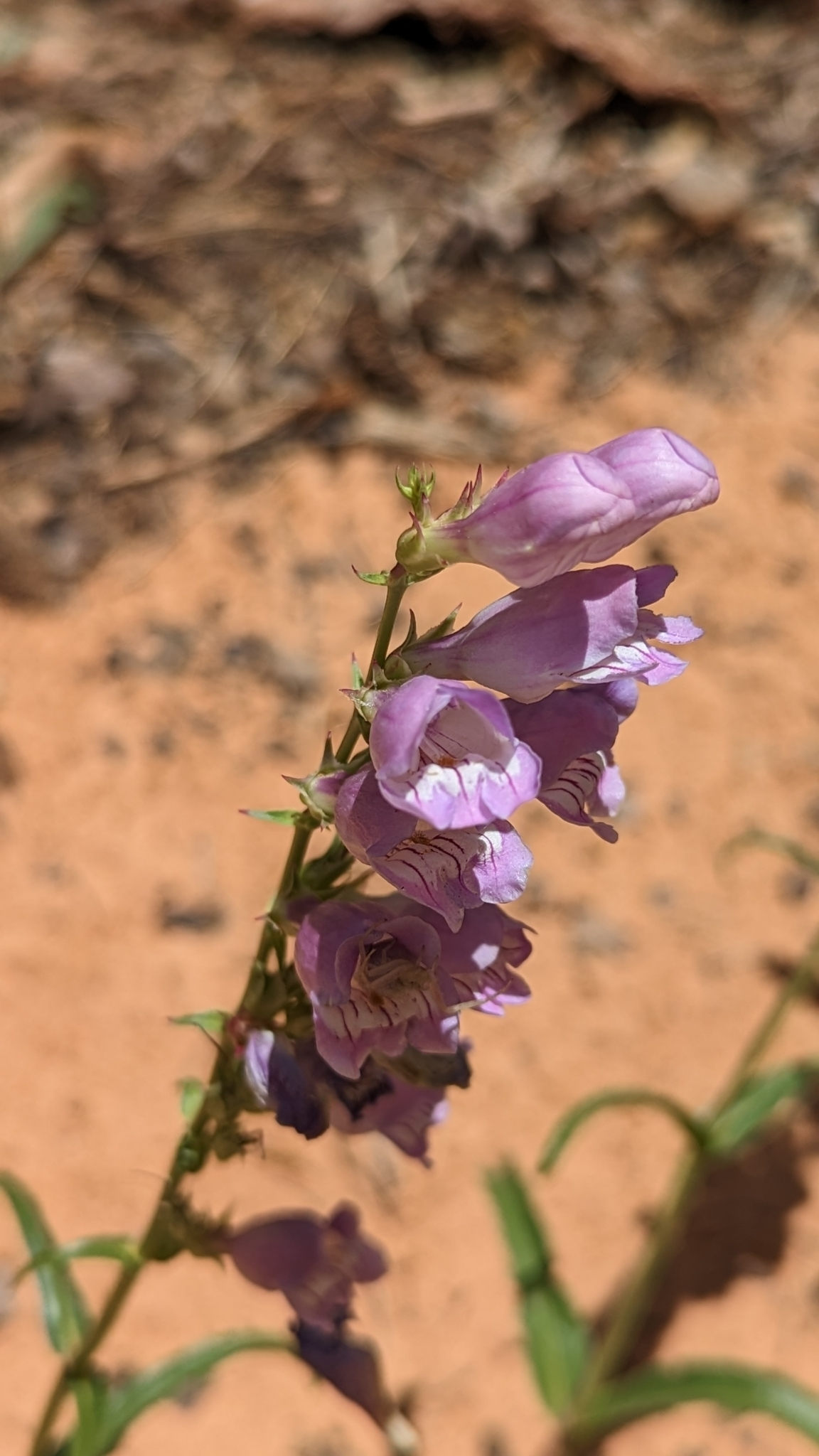
- In the Canaan Mountain Wilderness

Conservation status
- Vulnerable (NatureServe)

Scientific classification
- Kingdom: Plantae
- Clade: Embryophytes
- Clade: Tracheophytes
- Clade: Angiosperms
- Clade: Eudicots
- Clade: Asterids
- Order: Lamiales
- Family: Plantaginaceae
- Genus: Penstemon
- Species: P. laevis

Binomial name
- Penstemon laevis Pennell

= Penstemon laevis =

Plant species in the veronica family

Penstemon laevis, the smooth penstemon, is a species in the veronica family native to Arizona and Utah in the western United States.

== Description ==
Smooth penstemons are herbaceous plants with flowering stems that reach 28 to 90 centimeters (11–35 in) tall, though occasionally it can be just 15 cm (6 in). It is a short-lived perennial species with an unbranched caudex atop a taproot. The leaves and the stems are all hairless with the stems growing straight upwards or leaning out and then growing upwards.

Plants have both basal leaves and leaves attached to the stems that are leathery in texture and somewhat glaucous with smooth, untoothed edges that can sometimes be undulate, the edges waving back and forth. The basal leaves and the lower ones on the stems are usually 3.5–12 centimeters (1.5–4.5 in) long, but can reach 15 cm (6 in) on occasion, but their width is just 0.8–3 cm. They are obovate, oblanceolate, to elliptic in shape with a tapering base and bluntly pointed tip. The stems have three to six pairs of leaves 2–12 centimeters (1–4.5 in) long and 0.6–2.9 cm wide.

The flowers are light purple to blue with prominent red-violet floral guide lines extending into the throat of the blooms. They all point in the same direction away from the stems are usually arranged in five to eight groups, though occasionally an inflorescence will have as many as 17 groups.

The fruit is a capsule that is 8–10 millimeters long and 5–6 mm wide.

== Taxonomy ==
Penstemon laevis was scientifically described by Francis W. Pennell in 1920. It is part of the genus Penstemon which is classified in the Plantaginaceae family. The species has no subspecies or botanical synonyms.

=== Names ===
The meaning of the species name, laevis, is "smooth" in Botanical Latin. Penstemon laevis is known by the common name smooth penstemon.

== Range and habitat ==
The smooth penstemon is native to just five or six counties in the Western United States in northern Arizona and southern Utah. In Arizona it grows in Mohave and Coconino counties. Meanwhile the species is found in Washington, Kane, and Garfield counties in Utah according to the Flora of North America. According to the Natural Resources Conservation Service it might also grow in Beaver County, Utah.

It grows on sandy soils in the sagebrush steppe, , pinyon–juniper woodlands, juniper woodlands, and oak–juniper woodland at elevations of 1,100 to 2,000 meters (3,600–6,600 ft).

== See also ==
List of Penstemon species
