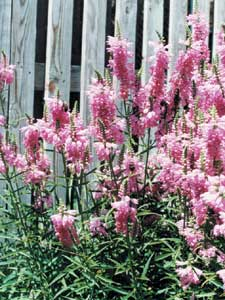
- Physostegia virginiana

Scientific classification
- Kingdom: Plantae
- Clade: Tracheophytes
- Clade: Angiosperms
- Clade: Eudicots
- Clade: Asterids
- Order: Lamiales
- Family: Lamiaceae
- Subfamily: Lamioideae
- Genus: Physostegia; Benth.

= Physostegia =

Genus of flowering plants

Physostegia, the lionshearts or false dragonheads (in reference to their similarity to Dracocephalum), is a genus of flowering plants in the family Lamiaceae, native to North America (United States, Canada, northern Mexico). They are erect rhizomatous herbaceous perennials inhabiting damp, sunny places. They grow up to 2 m (7 ft) tall with purple or pink tubular flowers in racemes in summer.

The generic name comes from two Greek words, physa (a bladder) and stege (a covering), referring to the calyx, which becomes full of fruit when mature.

Physostegia virginiana is the most common species, and is known as "obedient plant".

Species

1. Physostegia angustifolia Fernald - lower Mississippi Valley, southern Great Plains
2. Physostegia correllii (Lundell) Shinners - Texas, northern Mexico
3. Physostegia digitalis Small - Texas, Louisiana, Arkansas, Alabama
4. Physostegia godfreyi P.D.Cantino - Florida Panhandle
5. Physostegia intermedia (Nutt.) Engelm. & A.Gray - lower Mississippi Valley, southern Great Plains
6. Physostegia ledinghamii (B.Boivin) P.D.Cantino - Northwest Territories, Alberta, Saskatchewan, Manitoba, North Dakota
7. Physostegia leptophylla Small - Southeast from Florida to Virginia
8. Physostegia longisepala P.D.Cantino - Texas, Louisiana
9. Physostegia parviflora Nutt. ex A.Gray - western Canada (Manitoba to British Columbia), northwestern + north-central United States (Illinois to Washington)
10. Physostegia pulchella Lundell - eastern Texas
11. Physostegia purpurea (Walter) S.F.Blake - Southeast from Florida to North Carolina
12. Physostegia virginiana (L.) Benth. - much of eastern + central US + Canada; northeastern Mexico
