= Clark State Forest =

State forest in Clark County, Indiana, U.S.

- Location within Indiana
- Location: Clark County, Indiana, USA
- Nearest city: Henryville, Indiana
- Coordinates: 38°34′0″N 85°47′45″W
- Area: 24,000 acres (97.12 km^{2})
- Established: May 1903
- Governing body: Indiana Department of Natural Resources

Clark State Forest, located just north of Henryville, Indiana in the United States, is Indiana's oldest state forest, formed in 1903 as a forest research facility and a nursery and later expanded by the Works Progress Administration. Originally 2,028 acres (8 km^{2}) of total land area, it is now almost 24,000 acres (100 km^{2}) and is bisected by Interstate 65. It features three trails used exclusively for hikers trails: two internal trails, and the 59-mile (95 km) Knobstone Trail. There are nine horse trails, and five miles (8 km) of mountain bike trails. Two nature preserves are also situated within the forest. The forest also contains a 100-yard (91 m) outdoor gun range.

== History ==
A concern around the turn of the 20th century was that many woodworking facilities in Indiana would be forced to close due to dwindling timber supplies. This wood was used by furniture makers and shipbuilders such as the Howard Shipyards. The timber industry was a major part of southern Indiana's agricultural income, but thousands of acres had been deforested. In response to the problem, the state of Indiana decided to establish a series of state forests to ensure the continued existence of timber for woodworking facilities, and to allow Indiana to maintain its ability to export hardwood. The Indiana General Assembly in 1901 created the Indiana State Board of Forestry.

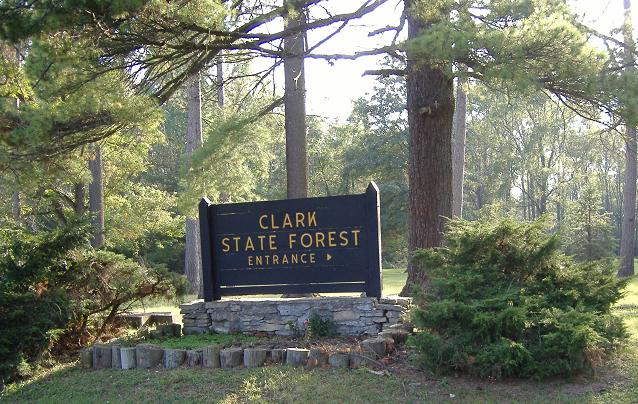
Entrance sign

In May 1903, the Indiana state government purchased 2,028 acres (8.21 km^{2}) of forest in the north of Clark County, noted for its knob features (isolated conical hills), for use as Indiana's first state forest, at a cost of US$16,000. Seedlings were planted at Clark State Forest, many of which were to be later moved to other parts of the state. This practice allowed more productive use of the land within the forest, and facilitated the teaching of the art of forestry. Charles C. Deam, a botanist who in 1909 became Indiana's state forester, was in charge of making the state forest an experimental laboratory for 20th-century forest care. Between the opening of the forest, and 1935, over 150 different tree types were tested, many of which survive yet.

During the Great Depression, the Works Progress Administration chose to make Clark State Forest a training center for the Civilian Conservation Corps, and also made it Indiana's largest CCC cantonment in November 1933. They created artificial lakes within Clark State Forest, and built many bridges, to aid in water conservation, provide beauty spots within the forest, and teach forestry skills to members of the Civilian Conservation Corps. The state forest's proximity to the Jeffersonville Quartermaster Depot was key in the decision to focus so much attention on it.

== Features ==
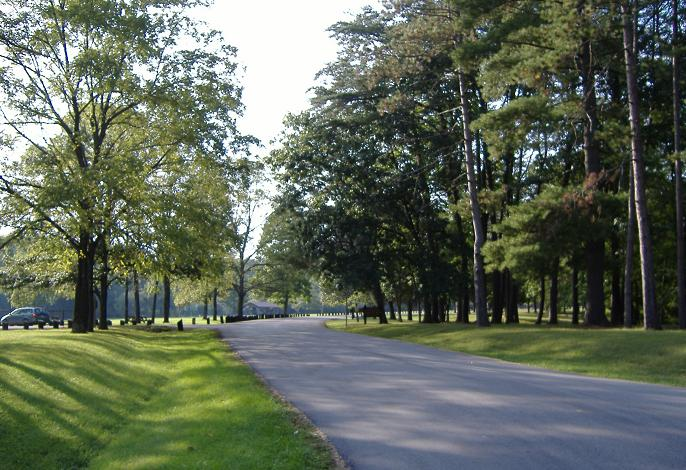
Entrance road to the forest

Having grown from its original 2,028 acres (8 km^{2}), Clark State Forest now covers 24,000 acres (97 km^{2}), with many roads and paths. The area also includes 100 miles (160 km) of horse trails, ranging from "easy" (for novice riders) to "rugged" (experienced riders only). The existence of these horse trails is one reason why nearby Charlestown State Park did not include them in its development plans. Hunting is allowed, except in those areas designated specifically for more popular recreational activities. Species of wildlife of interest to hunters include deer, foxes, ruffed grouse, squirrels, wild turkeys, raccoons and woodcocks. All the campsites are by design primitive, and the only other areas in the forest that are allowed for camping are 100 feet (30 m) off the Knobstone Trail. Other recreational pursuits for visitors include hiking, biking, fishing and picnicking. All of these human activities are however of secondary importance to the primary function of the state forest, which is timber management.

Both native and non-native tree saplings are grown within the forest. Trees officially allowed to be sold for lumber within the state forest are between 70 and 100 years old. Often, the chosen trees are felled to provide an area for native deer to live in the open, and to give smaller animals a brush area for their subsistence. Included in some protected areas are the White Oak (160 acres or 0.6 km^{2}) and the Chestnut Oak/Virginia Pine (20 acres) Nature Preserves. Other species of tree include black oak, black walnut, pignut hickory, sugar maples, and tulip trees.

The lakes of Clark State Forest include:

- Bowen (7 acres or 2.8 ha)
- Franke (13 acres or 5.3 ha)
- Oak (2.5 acres or 1.0 ha)
- Pine (2 acres or 0.81 ha)
- Schlamm (18 acres or 7.3 ha)
- Shaw (13 acres or 5.3 ha)
- Wilcox (5 acres or 2.0 ha)
