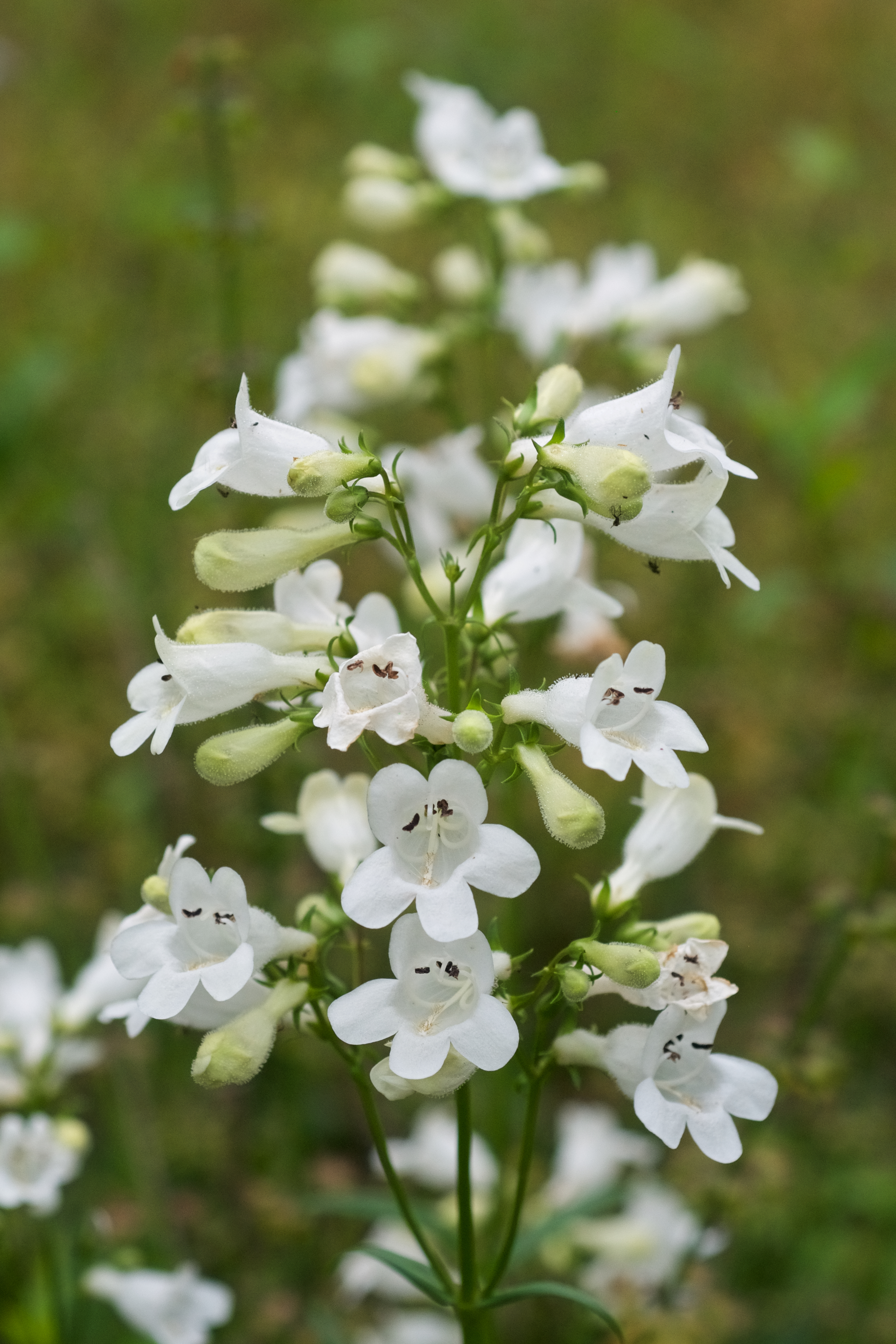
- At Boyle Park in Little Rock, Arkansas

Conservation status
- Secure (NatureServe)

Scientific classification
- Kingdom: Plantae
- Clade: Tracheophytes
- Clade: Angiosperms
- Clade: Eudicots
- Clade: Asterids
- Order: Lamiales
- Family: Plantaginaceae
- Genus: Penstemon
- Species: P. digitalis

Binomial name
- Penstemon digitalis Nutt. ex Sims

Synonyms
- List: Chelone digitalis (Nutt.) Sweet (1825); Penstemon alluviorum Pennell (1933); Penstemon digitalis var. albidus Trautv. (1839); Penstemon digitalis f. baueri Steyerm. (1941); Penstemon digitalis var. latifolius Regel (1867); Penstemon laevigatus subsp. alluviorum (Pennell) R.W.Benn. (1963); Penstemon laevigatus subsp. digitalis (Nutt.) R.W.Benn. (1963); Penstemon laevigatus var. digitalis (Nutt.) A.Gray (1878)

= Penstemon digitalis =

Foxglove beard-tongue

Central North American species of penstemon

Penstemon digitalis (known by the common names foxglove beard-tongue, foxglove beardtongue, talus slope penstemon, and white beardtongue) is a species of flowering plant in the plantain family, Plantaginaceae. The flowers are white and are borne in summer. According to Francis W. Pennell it is a native of the Mississippi basin and its occurrences in Canada and the eastern United States are introductions. Because of this Penstemon digitalis is the most widespread species of Penstemon east of the Mississippi River.

== Description ==
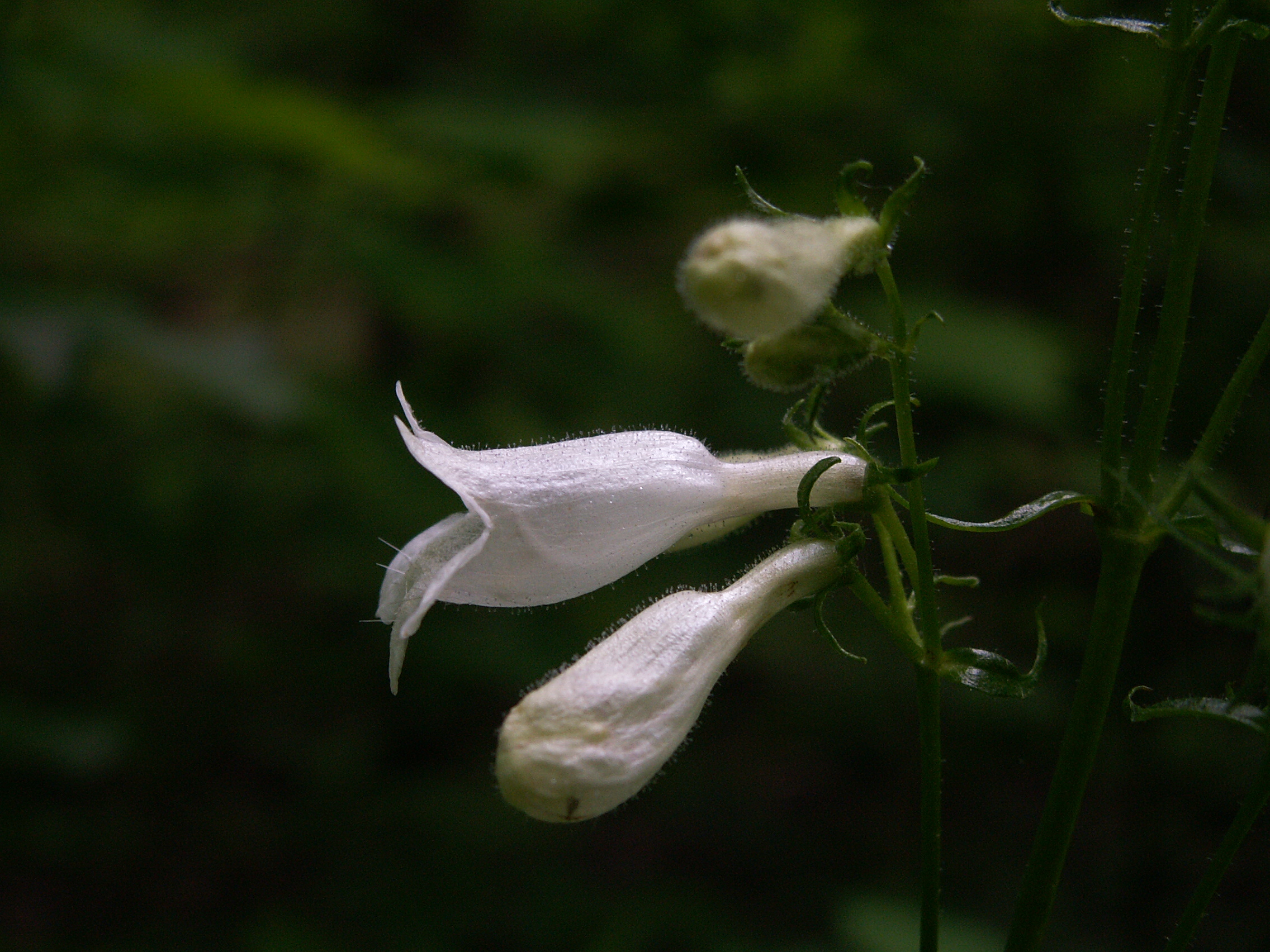
Close-up of flower blooming in Schenley Park, Pittsburgh

Penstemon digitalis is a glabrous 3 to 5 foot tall herbaceous plant with opposite, shiny green, simple leaves, on slender, purple stems. The leaves are up to 5 inches long. While upright, the stems average anywhere from 2 to 3 feet tall. The flowering panicle extends to almost one third of the plant's height and has pairs of branches which repeat with two flowers multiple times. The pedicels are almost one fourth of an inch long and produce 1.25 inch long two-lipped tubular flowers over dark green foliage. The flowers have tiny white hairs on the outside of the tube. The plant has elliptic basal leaves and lance-shaped to oblong stem leaves.

The species was originally described as "Fox-Glove-Like Pentstemon" (sic) and the specific epithet digitalis is a direct reference to the foxglove genus Digitalis. The plant grows in moist, sandy soil in full sun in meadows, prairies, fields, wood margins, open woods and along railroad tracks. Its bloom period is from late spring to early summer. The plant is known to attract butterflies, bees, and birds such as hummingbirds. It tolerates deer browsing.

== Taxonomy ==
Penstemon digitalis was scientifically described and named by John Sims using an earlier incomplete description by Thomas Nuttall. In 1933 Francis W. Pennell described a species he named Penstemon alluviorum. It is still recognized in publications such as Flora of the Southeastern United States, but it is regarded as a synonym by Plants of the World Online.

== Genome size ==
The genus Penstemon is the largest in North America with 270 species. However, genome size was relatively unknown for the species, which can be important for taxonomy. Scientists estimated the genome size for 40% of the species in the genus using flow cytometry. Penstemon digitalis has one of the largest genomes of the genus Penstemon.

== Range ==
The natural distribution of Penstemon digitalis is in the central United States, largely in the watershed of the Mississippi River. Southwest of this it extends into Texas and to the east into Alabama. In the north it reaches into Michigan.

It is naturalized across the eastern United States and Canada from South Carolina up the eastern seaboard to Ontario and Québec.

=== Conservation ===
The conservation organization NatureServe evaluated Penstemon digitalis in 2016 and found it to be secure (G5) in its natural range.

== Cultivation ==
Like other Penstemon species, it is used in roadside planting because it is easily grown and showy. It is recommended for easy use in gardens from the Midwest to the Atlantic coast and Pacific Northwest by the American Penstemon Society. Iowa's Living Roadway Profiler from the Iowa Department of Transportation says that the plant's "decorative seed capsules add interest in the fall and winter".

One of the plant's cultivars is named 'Husker Red' because of its red foliage that has white or bluish-pink flowers. The Perennial Plant Association chose the 'Husker Red' cultivar of Penstemon digitalis as the 1996 Perennial Plant of the Year. The author of the book Perennial All-Stars described 'Husker Red' as "a stunning flowering perennial" and that "you can easily see why the Perennial Plant Association chose this perennial above all others". 'Husker Red' was named after the Nebraska Cornhuskers. The other cultivar, 'Mystica', is green at first and then later changes to red in the fall.

Penstemon 'Dark Towers' is a hybrid between Penstemon digitalis 'Husker Red' and Penstemon 'Prairie Splendor' (which in turn is a hybrid of Penstemon cobaea and Penstemon triflorus). The hybrid has tubular pink flowers that grow up to 1.5 inches tall, red foliage, and is 1.5 feet to 3 feet tall. Although 'Dark Tower's is similar to 'Husker Red', its red foliage is darker than that of the 'Husker Red' cultivar and has more height. It also stays red for a longer time in the summer. Dale Lindgren created and named both 'Husker Red' and 'Dark Towers' at the University of Nebraska–Lincoln in 1983. Lindgren decided to create 'Husker Red' because of its purplish-red foliage.

== See also ==
- List of Penstemon species
