= Botanical Latin =

Technical language based on Neo-Latin

Botanical Latin is a technical language based on Neo-Latin, used for descriptions of botanical taxa. From 1935 to 2011, the International Code of Botanical Nomenclature mandated Botanical Latin to be used for the descriptions of new taxa (other than algae or fossils). It is still the only language other than English accepted for descriptions. The names of organisms governed by the Code also have forms based on Latin.

Botanical Latin is primarily a written language. It includes taxon names derived from any language or even arbitrarily derived, and consequently there is no single consistent pronunciation system. When speakers of different languages use Botanical Latin in speech, they use pronunciations influenced by their own languages, or, notably in French, there may be variant spellings based on Latin. There are at least two pronunciation systems used for Latin by English speakers. Neither system, however, works across the full spectrum of botanical names, because many non-Latin words, such as people's names, have been used.

== Origin ==
Alphonse Pyramus de Candolle described the language in 1880:

C'est le latin arrangé par Linné à l'usage des descriptions et, j'oserai dire, à l'usage de ceux qui n'aiment ni les complications grammaticales, ni les phrases disposées sens dessus dessous." (Quoted by W. T. Stearn) [It is Latin chosen by Linnaeus to use in descriptions, and, I dare say, for use by those who like neither grammatical complications nor sentences turned upside-down.]

De Candolle estimated that to learn Botanical Latin would take three months' work for an English speaker not already familiar with any language of Latin origin, and one month for an Italian.

William T. Stearn wrote:

Botanical Latin is best described as a modern Romance language of special technical application, derived from Renaissance Latin with much plundering of ancient Greek, which has evolved, mainly since 1700 and primarily through the work of Carl Linnaeus (1707–78), to serve as an international medium for the scientific naming of plants in all their vast numbers and manifold diversity. These include many thousands of plants unknown to the Greeks and Romans of classical times and for which names have had to be provided as a means of reference. Their description necessitates the recording of structures often too small for comprehension by the naked eye, hence unknown to the ancients and needing words with precise restricted applications foreign to classical Latin.

== Orthography of taxon names ==
Latin names of organisms are generally used in English without alteration, but some informal derivatives are used as common names. For example, the -idae ending of subclass names is changed to -ids (e.g., Rosidae produces rosids); the subfamily ending -oideae is changed to -oids (e.g., Papilionoideae produces papilionoids). The -ids common names have, however also been adopted as rankless clade names, sometimes containing further -ids clade names, so that, for example, in the APG IV classification, rosids contain both fabids and malvids.

More extensive modifications to the spelling and pronunciation are routinely used in some other languages. French organism names are usually gallicized. For example: Chlorophyceae becomes Chlorophycées; Portulacineae becomes Portulacinées.

=== Alphabet ===
The Pre-Classical Latin alphabet consisted of 21 letters, to which y and z were added in the Classical epoch, w was later added, and the vowel/consonant pairs i and j, u and v, were later separated. This 26-letter alphabet is used for taxon names in Botanical Latin. Diacritics are not used in names, and a dieresis is considered an optional mark that does not affect spelling.

== Pronunciation ==
Some English speakers, and some speakers of other languages, use the reconstructed pronunciation guide for Classical Latin when speaking Botanical Latin words. Latin names pronounced by gardeners and English botanists usually follow a system close to English. It differs greatly from classical pronunciation, and also from Ecclesiastical Latin pronunciation (which is based on Italian, and has, for example, c before i or e pronounced as ch).

=== Classical pronunciation ===
Every vowel is pronounced, except diphthongs, which are treated as single long vowels.

In classical Latin words of several syllables the stress falls on the syllable next to the last one (the penultimate) when this syllable is long ... e.g., for-mō'-sus, or when two consonants separate the two last vowels, e.g., cru-ěn'-tus ... on the last syllable but two (the antepenultimate) when the last but one is short, e.g. flō-ri-dus.

"These rules cannot satisfactorily be applied to all generic names and specific epithets commemorating persons. About 80 per cent of generic names and 30 per cent of specific epithets come from languages other than Latin and Greek. A simple and consistent method of pronouncing them does not exist."

The rules also create difficulties with the -ii and -iae endings derived from personal names, because the stress falls in a place that is not usual for those names.

=== English pronunciation ===
The following table is simplified from Stearn 1992. The pronunciation transcriptions for medical terminology in major medical dictionaries, such as Dorland’s Illustrated Medical Dictionary and Stedman's Medical Dictionary, match these values.

Letter(s)	IPA	Pronounced like
ā	/eɪ/	fate
ǎ	/æ/	fat
ae (diphthong)	/iː/, /iə/	meat
au (diphthong)	/ɔː/	like aw in awl
c before a, o, or u	/k/	cat
c before e, i, or y	/s/	centre
ē	/iː/	me
ĕ	/ɛ/	pet
ei (diphthong)	/aɪ/	height
g before a, o, or u	/ɡ/	go
g before e, i, or y	/d͡ʒ/	gem
i	/ɪ/	pit

Letter(s)	IPA	Pronounced like
ō	/oʊ/	note
ŏ	/ɒ/	not
oe (diphthong)	/iː/, /iə/	like ee in bee
oi (not a diphthong)	/oʊ.ɪ/	like owi in growing
ph	/f/	like f
t	/t/	table, or nation
ū	/uː/	brute
ŭ	/ʌ/	tub
ui (not a diphthong)	/uː.ɪ/, /ʊ.ɪ/	doing
v	/v/	van
ȳ	/aɪ/	cypher
y̆	/ɪ/	cynical

== Resources ==
=== Online ===
- Finding derivations /meanings for epithets. See, e.g.,: Plantillustrations.org: gracilis,-is,-e "slender", "thin", "graceful" (Site does not always give a derivation)
- A Grammatical Dictionary of Botanical Latin (www.mobot.org)
- International Code of Nomenclature for algae, fungi, and plants (Shenzhen Code) 2018

=== Books ===
- Stearn, W.T. (2004) "Botanical Latin" (4th ed), Timber Press, Portland Oregon. ISBN 9780881926279
- Backer, C.A. (1936) Verklarend woordenboek der wetenschappelijke namen van de in Nederland en Nederlandsch-Indië in het wild groeiende en in tuinen en parken gekweekte varens en hoogere planten (Edition Nicoline van der Sijs). (Explanatory dictionary of the scientific names of .. plants grown in the Netherlands and the Dutch East Indies...)
- Brown, R.W. (1956). The Composition of Scientific Words. Washington, D.C.: Smithsonian Institution Press.
- George, A. & Short, E. (2013) "A Primer of Botanical Latin with Vocabulary" Cambridge University Press

== See also ==
- Philosophia Botanica 1751, by Linnaeus, described as "The first textbook of descriptive systematic botany and botanical latin."
- Syllable stress of Botanical Latin
