= List of Plantaginales of Montana =

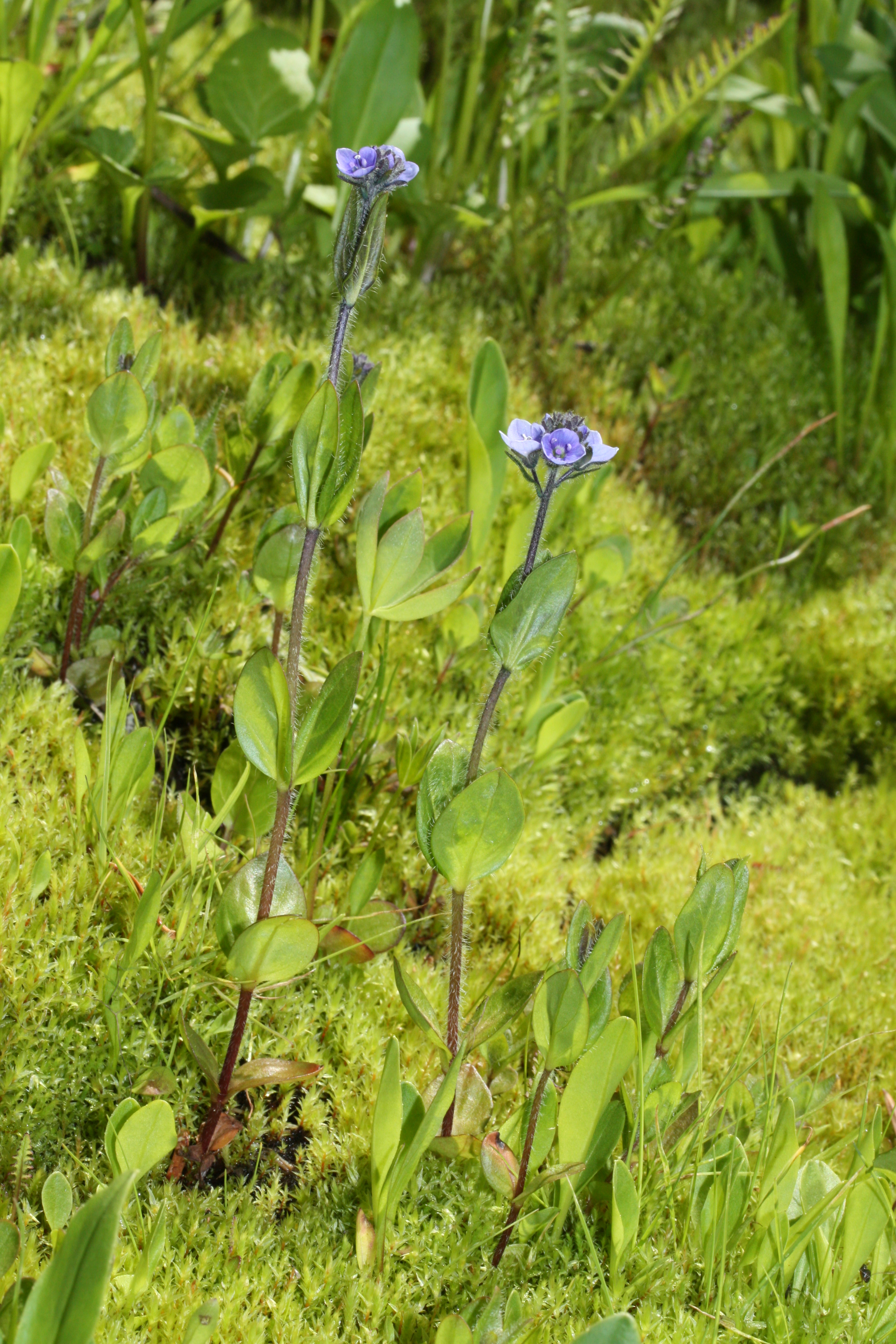
Alpine speedwell, Veronica wormskjoldii

There are at least 73 members of the Plantain order, Plantaginales, found in Montana. Some of these species are exotics (not native to Montana) and some species have been designated as Species of Concern.

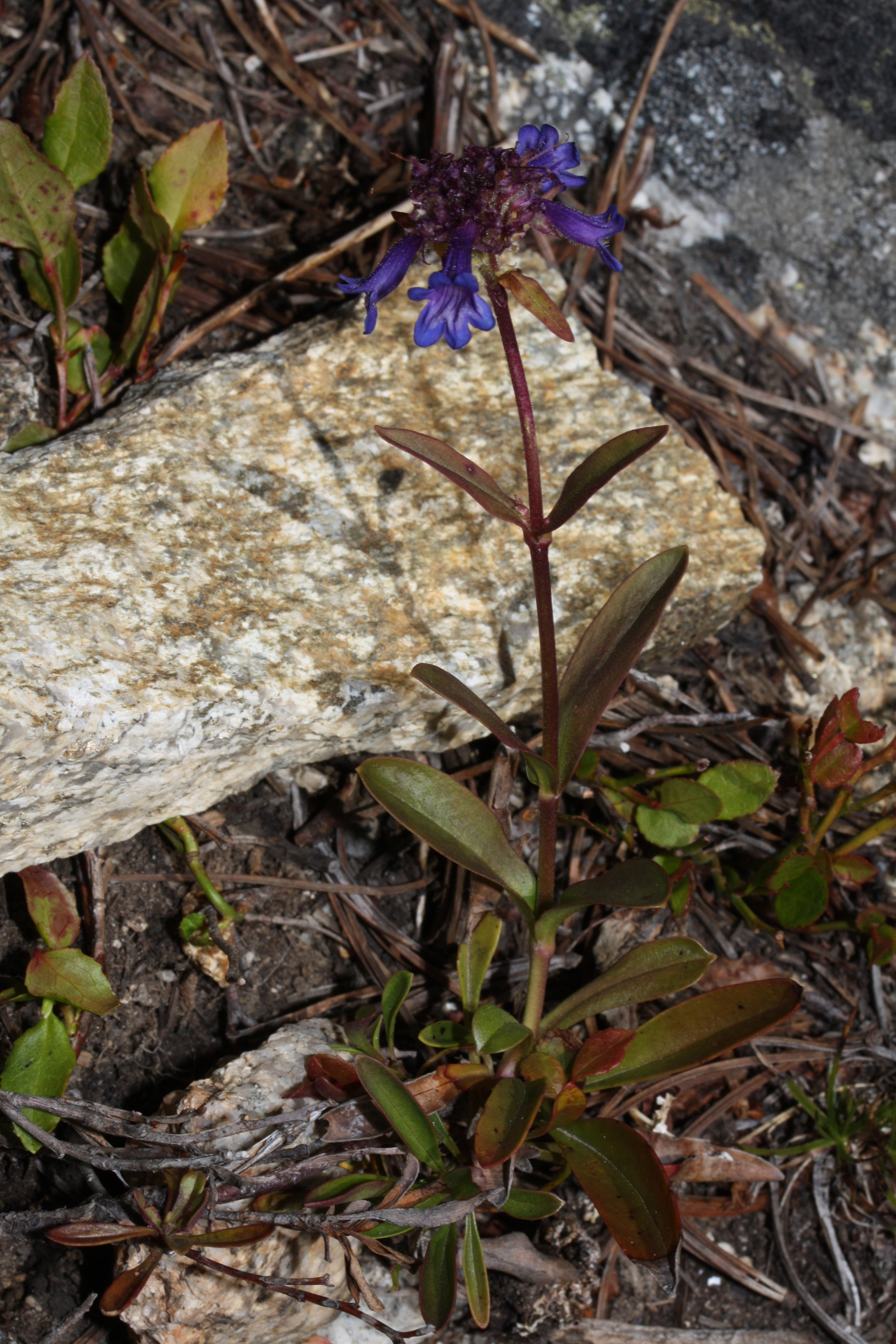
Small-flowered beardtongue, Penstemon procerus

Family: Plantaginaceae

- Bacopa rotundifolia, roundleaf water-hyssop
- Besseya rubra, red kittentails
- Besseya wyomingensis, Wyoming kittentails
- Chaenorhinum minus, dwarf snapdragon
- Chionophila tweedyi, Tweedy snowlover
- Collinsia parviflora, small-flower blue-eyed Mary
- Digitalis purpurea, purple foxglove
- Gratiola ebracteata, bractless hedge-hyssop
- Gratiola neglecta, clammy hedge-hyssop
- Limosella aquatica, northern mudwort
- Linaria dalmatica, Dalmatian toadflax
- Linaria vulgaris, butter-and-eggs
- Nuttallanthus texanus, blue toadflax
- Penstemon albertinus, Alberta beardtongue
- Penstemon albidus, white-flower beardtongue
- Penstemon angustifolius, narrowleaf penstemon
- Penstemon arenicola, red desert beardtongue
- Penstemon aridus, stiff-leaf beardtongue
- Penstemon attenuatus, taper-leaf beardtongue
- Penstemon attenuatus var. attenuatus, sulphur penstemon
- Penstemon attenuatus var. pseudoprocerus, taper-leaf beardtongue
- Penstemon caryi, Cary's beardtongue
- Penstemon cyananthus, Wasatch beardtongue
- Penstemon cyaneus, dark-blue beardtongue
- Penstemon deustus, hot-rock beardtongue
- Penstemon diphyllus, two-leaf beardtongue
- Penstemon ellipticus, egg-leaf beardtongue
- Penstemon eriantherus, fuzzy-tongue penstemon
- Penstemon eriantherus var. cleburnei, Cleburn's beardtongue
- Penstemon fruticosus, shrubby beardtongue
- Penstemon glaber, smooth beardtongue
- Penstemon globosus, globe beardtongue
- Penstemon gracilis, slender beardtongue
- Penstemon grandiflorus, large-flowered beardtongue
- Penstemon humilis, low beardtongue
- Penstemon laricifolius, larch-leaf beardtongue
- Penstemon lemhiensis, Lemhi beardtongue
- Penstemon lyallii, Lyall beardtongue
- Penstemon montanus, cordroot beardtongue
- Penstemon nitidus, wax-leaf beardtongue
- Penstemon nitidus var. nitidus
- Penstemon nitidus var. polyphyllus
- Penstemon payettensis, Payette beardtongue
- Penstemon procerus, small-flower beardtongue
- Penstemon radicosus, mat-root beardtongue
- Penstemon rydbergii, Rydberg's beardtongue
- Penstemon wilcoxii, Wilcox's beardtongue
- Plantago canescens, hairy plantain
- Plantago elongata, slender plantain
- Plantago eriopoda, saline plantain
- Plantago hirtella, Mexican plantain
- Plantago lanceolata, English plantain
- Plantago major, common plantain
- Plantago patagonica, woolly plantain
- Plantago tweedyi, Tweedy's plantain
- Synthyris canbyi, Mission Mountain kittentails
- Synthyris missurica, western mountain kittentails
- Synthyris pinnatifida, cut-leaf kittentails
- Veronica americana, American speedwell
- Veronica anagallis-aquatica, brook-pimpernell
- Veronica arvensis, corn speedwell
- Veronica biloba, two-lobe speedwell
- Veronica chamaedrys, germander speedwell
- Veronica cusickii, Cusick's speedwell
- Veronica longifolia, long-leaf speedwell
- Veronica officinalis, gypsy-weed
- Veronica peregrina, purslane speedwell
- Veronica persica, bird-eye speedwell
- Veronica scutellata, marsh-speedwell
- Veronica serpyllifolia ssp. humifusa, brightblue speedwell
- Veronica serpyllifolia ssp. serpyllifolia, thymeleaf speedwell
- Veronica verna, spring speedwell
- Veronica wormskjoldii, alpine speedwell

== See also ==
- List of dicotyledons of Montana
