= Penstemon micranthus =

Penstemon micranthus is a botanical synonym of two species of plant:

- Penstemon procerus var. procerus published in 1834 by Thomas Nuttall
- Penstemon strictus published in 1845 by John Torrey
