= American speedwell =

American speedwell is a common name for several plants in the genus Veronica occurring in North America and may refer to:

- Veronica americana, known as American speedwell in the United States
- Veronica peregrina, known as American speedwell in the British Isles where it is naturalized
