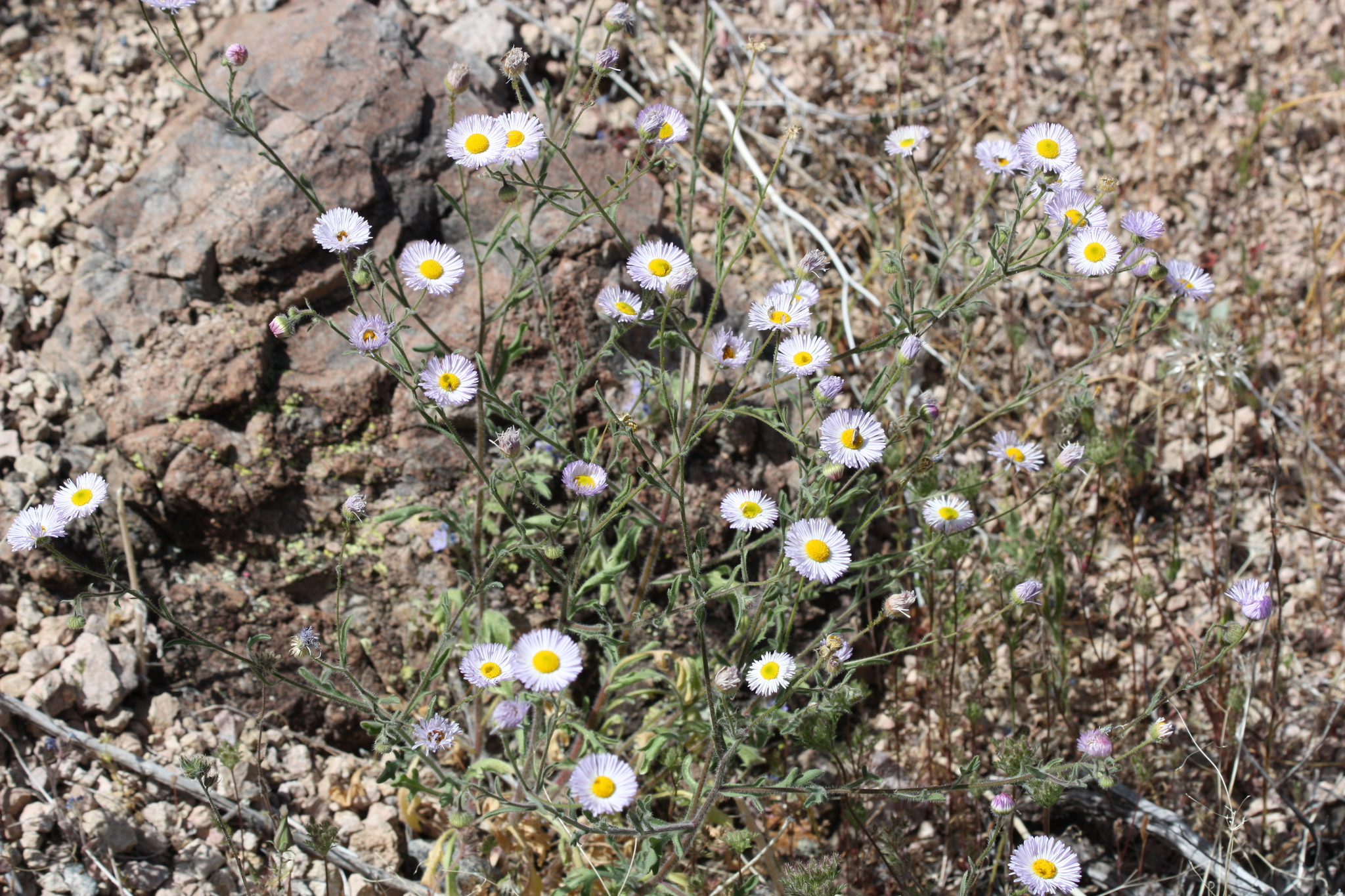

Scientific classification
- Kingdom: Plantae
- Clade: Tracheophytes
- Clade: Angiosperms
- Clade: Eudicots
- Clade: Asterids
- Order: Asterales
- Family: Asteraceae
- Genus: Erigeron
- Species: E. lobatus

Binomial name
- Erigeron lobatus A.Nelson

= Erigeron lobatus =

Species of flowering plant

Erigeron lobatus is a rare species of flowering plant in the family Asteraceae known by the common name lobed fleabane. It has been found the state of Sonora in northwestern Mexico as well as in the southwestern United States (Arizona, southern Nevada, southeastern Utah).

Erigeron lobatus is a branching annual herb up to 50 centimeters (20 inches) tall, producing a taproot. The leaves are up to 10 cm (4 inches) long, with pinnatifid or bipinnatifid lobes. The plant produces 1-5 flower heads per stem, each head with up to 110 white ray florets surrounding numerous yellow disc florets. The species grows in desert regions, often alongside creosotebush.
