= Penstemon aridus =

- West of Bannack in Beaverhead County, Montana

Conservation status
- Secure (NatureServe)

Scientific classification
- Kingdom: Plantae
- Clade: Tracheophytes
- Clade: Angiosperms
- Clade: Eudicots
- Clade: Asterids
- Order: Lamiales
- Family: Plantaginaceae
- Genus: Penstemon
- Species: P. aridus

Binomial name
- Penstemon aridus Rydb.

Plant species in the veronica family

Penstemon aridus, commonly called the stiffleaf penstemon, is a species from the northwestern United States in Idaho, Montana, and Wyoming. It is a member of the veronica family.

== Description ==
The stiffleaf penstemon is a herbaceous plant that grows a tuft of leaves and flowering stems from a caudex with tightly spaced branches. The flowering stems are typically 6 to 20 centimeters (2.5–8 in) tall, but can on occasion reach 25 cm (10 in). The stems are either completely covered in stiff, backwards pointing hairs, or hairless towards the ends while retrorsely hairy below.

The plants have both basal leaves and leaves attached to the flowering stems, but far more basal leaves forming a small tuft with distinctive rosettes. All the leaves are not leathery, have smooth edges, and can be hairless or somewhat covered in fine, short, usually erect, hairs. The basal leaves and the lowest ones on the stems are 1.5–6.5 centimeters (0.5–2.5 in) long and just 1–7 millimeters wide. With this narrow width, they are similar to a grass blade or very narrowly oblanceolate, resembling a reversed spear head with the widest part past the midpoint. Each flowering stem has four to ten leaves attached in pairs to opposite sides by short leaf stems, directly by the base of the leaf, or even clasping the stem. The uppermost leaves are 0.7–3.3 cm long and just 1–3 mm wide, grass-like to narrowly lanceolate.

The small flowers are vividly blue to violet, the outside covered in glandular hairs with sparse white hairs on the floor of flower tube, and a length of 1.1–1.7 cm. They are funnel shaped with five lobes and reddish-purple floral guide lines.

Stiffleaf penstemons are very similar to low penstemon (Penstemon humilis), Alberta penstemon (Penstemon albertinus), and blue mist penstemon (Penstemon virens), however the generally very narrow basal leaves distinguish the species except in rare instances where stiffleaf penstemons are growing at very low elevations or in shady locations. In addition the range of the blue mist penstemon and stiffleaf penstemon do not overlap, blue mist penstemon only being found as far north as southern Wyoming. Similarly, the low penstemon only overlaps slightly with stiffleaf penstemons in eastern Idaho and Johnson County, Wyoming.

== Taxonomy ==
In the year 1900 the botanist Per Axel Rydberg described a new species in the Penstemon genus, which he named Penstemon aridus. Together with its genus it is part of the Plantaginaceae family and has no botanical synonyms.

=== Names ===
In Botanical Latin the species name aridus means dry or withered. Penstemon aridus is known by the common names stiffleaf penstemon, stiff-leaf penstemon, or stiff-leaf beardtongue.

== Range and habitat ==
Stiffleaf penstemons are native to three northwestern interior states, Wyoming, Montana, and Idaho. In Wyoming they are found in the north in the Bighorn Mountains extending north into Montana and the northern half of the Absaroka Range to the west. To the north they grow in the south central and southwestern parts of Montana and over the mountains into eastern Idaho. The species is recorded at elevations of 1,500 to 2,900 meters (4,900–9,500 ft).

It grows in mountain grasslands, sagebrush shrublands, and on rocky hillsides, usually dry and open habitats.

== Uses ==
The stiffleaf penstemon is planted in gardens, particularly in the northern Great Plains. As a small plant, it can be overwhelmed by larger species and is easily overlooked, but is recommended as a plant for troughs with other small rock garden species.

== See also ==
List of Penstemon species
