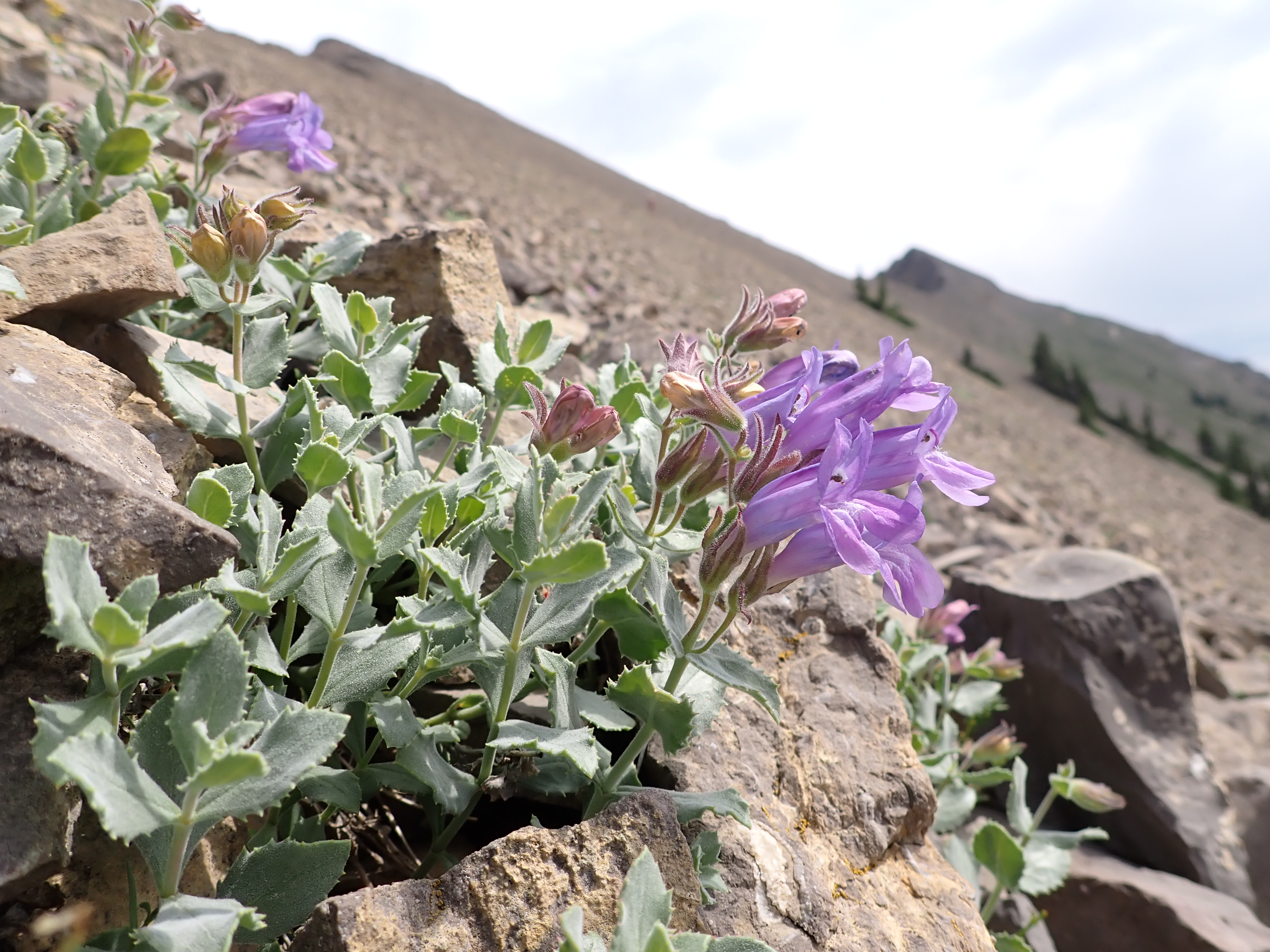
- On subalpine talus slopes along the southern slopes of Hardscrabble Peak

Conservation status
- Apparently Secure (NatureServe)

Scientific classification
- Kingdom: Plantae
- Clade: Embryophytes
- Clade: Tracheophytes
- Clade: Angiosperms
- Clade: Eudicots
- Clade: Asterids
- Order: Lamiales
- Family: Plantaginaceae
- Genus: Penstemon
- Species: P. montanus

Binomial name
- Penstemon montanus Greene

Varieties
- P. m. var. idahoensis; P. m. var. montanus

Synonyms
- Penstemon woodsii A.Nelson

= Penstemon montanus =

Plant species in the veronica family

Penstemon montanus, the cordroot penstemon or mountain penstemon, is a species in the veronica family from the Rocky Mountains in the northern United States.

== Description ==
The cordroot penstemon is a perennial species that grows from a thick taproot. Atop the root it has a branching caudex that is compact when growing from rock crevices and with longer, thinner branches that are similar to rhizomes when emerging from unstable rock slopes. The stems are often flexible or lax, with a herbaceous character for the whole length, but are frequently woody near the base, they can grow straight upwards or outwards then curving upright to lengths of 6 to 30 centimeters (2.5–12 in). Plants can have both stems that will develop flowers and flowerless ones, but the flowerless ones can be very few in number or poorly developed. All shoots are pubescent, covered in hairs, and can have stiff backwards pointing ones near the base of stems and glandular hairs above.

Each stem will have four to seven pairs of leaves attached to opposite sides of the stem that are usually nearly of the same size from top to bottom. They are normally 0.9–3.5 centimeters long, but might be as much as 5.6 cm. Their width is 0.7–1.7 cm and rarely 2.8 cm.

The flowers are funnel shaped, lavender, blue, or violet, and 2.6–3.9 centimeters (1–1.5 in) long.

== Taxonomy ==
In 1892 Edward Lee Greene scientifically described a new species in the Penstemon genus, which he named Penstemon montanus. He described the species from a specimen collected by Frank Tweedy in Yellowstone National Park on Mount Norris in July 1886. Along with its genus it is part of the Plantaginaceae family.

=== Varieties ===
Penstemon montanus has two accepted varieties. They are distinguished by variety idahoensis having never having glandular hairs on it leaves, but ranging from hairy to hairless, with smooth edges or very small teeth. The more common variety montanus has distinctly toothed edges and leaves that are always hairy and can be glandular.

==== Penstemon montanus var. idahoensis ====
This variety is endemic to Idaho, where it grows in the central parts of the state in Blaine, Custer, Elmore, and Valley counties. It was first described as a subspecies in 1957 by David D. Keck before being reduced to a variety by Arthur Cronquist in 1959. The edges of its leaves are smooth or only very faintly toothed. It is known as the Central Idaho penstemon.

==== Penstemon montanus var. montanus ====
The autonymic variety is more widespread, its native range including Utah, Wyoming, Idaho, and Montana. It has one synonym, Penstemon woodsii, published in 1911 by Aven Nelson. The edges of its leaves are serrate to dentate, having large asymmetrical teeth that point towards the tip to symmetrical coarse teeth.

=== Names ===
Penstemon montanus is known by the common names cordroot penstemon, mountain penstemon, cordroot beardtongue, and mountain beardtongue.

== Range and habitat ==
The natural range of the cordroot penstemon extends across four northern US states, Utah, Wyoming, Idaho, and Montana. In Utah it grows in five northern counties, Sanpete, Juab, Utah, Duchesne, and Salt Lake. It is mostly found in the northwest of Wyoming and is widespread in Idaho. To the east in Montana its range extends across the southwest as far east as Fergus County. It grows in mountainous areas at elevations of 1,500 to 3,500 meters (4,900–11,500 ft).

Though it is associated with aspen groves, spruce–fir forests, and scrub below timberline, it usually grows on rocky slopes such as the scree fields and the rocks that accumulate at the base of cliffs. It grows from cracks in rocks and cliff faces less frequently.

== See also ==
List of Penstemon species
