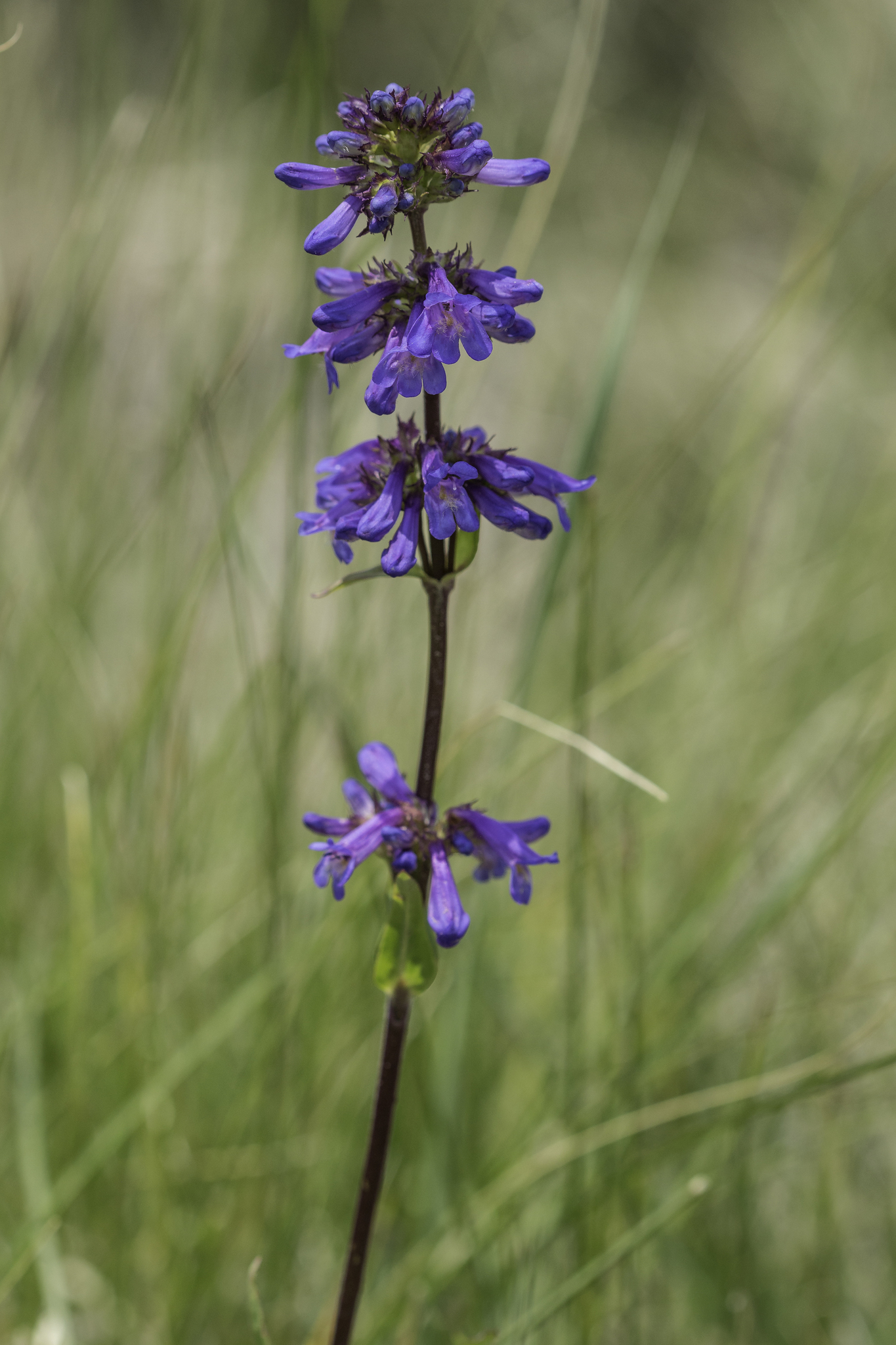
- In Valles Caldera National Preserve, New Mexico

Conservation status
- Apparently Secure (NatureServe)

Scientific classification
- Kingdom: Plantae
- Clade: Tracheophytes
- Clade: Angiosperms
- Clade: Eudicots
- Clade: Asterids
- Order: Lamiales
- Family: Plantaginaceae
- Genus: Penstemon
- Species: P. rydbergii

Binomial name
- Penstemon rydbergii A.Nelson

Varieties
- P. r. var. aggregatus; P. r. var. oreocharis; P. r. var. rydbergii

Synonyms
- List: Penstemon aggregatus; Penstemon ellipticus; Penstemon erosus; Penstemon lacerellus; Penstemon latiusculus; Penstemon oreocharis; Penstemon productus; Penstemon recurvatus; Penstemon vaseyanus

= Penstemon rydbergii =

Plant species in the veronica family

Penstemon rydbergii, commonly known as Rydberg's penstemon or meadow penstemon, is a perennial plant in the plantain family (Plantaginaceae) that grows in damp, grassy meadows of the Great Basin and Rocky Mountains of the western United States.

== Description ==
The meadow penstemon usually has two kinds of stems, short ones with just leaves and tall ones ending in an inflorescence. All of its herbaceous stems grow from a branching, woody caudex, usually with a taproot beneath it. The flowering stems are usually 20 to 70 centimeters (8 to 27.5 in), but can on grow to as much as 1.2 m (3 ft 11 in). Stems may grow straight upwards, outwards before curving to grow upwards, or grow along the ground. All of the stems can be hairy or hairless, but sometimes the hairs are only found on lines on the stems below where the leaves attach. Very often the stems get progressively more red towards the top.

Most of the leaves are basal, at the base of the plant, and attached to the flowerless stems. The basal leaves and the lowest ones on the flowering stems are 2.5–15 cm (1–6 in) long, but more usually 3.5–7 cm (1.5–3 in). Their width is 0.5–2.2 cm, though commonly 1–1.5 cm. Their shape is oblanceolate to elliptic with tapering bases and a narrow to widely angled point, very rarely mucronate. The leaves attached to the flowering stems are in three to six pairs attached to opposite sides and are 2.5–11 cm (1–4 in) long, though usually shorter than 7 cm. They are 0.3–2.4 cm wide and lanceolate to elliptic or oblong.

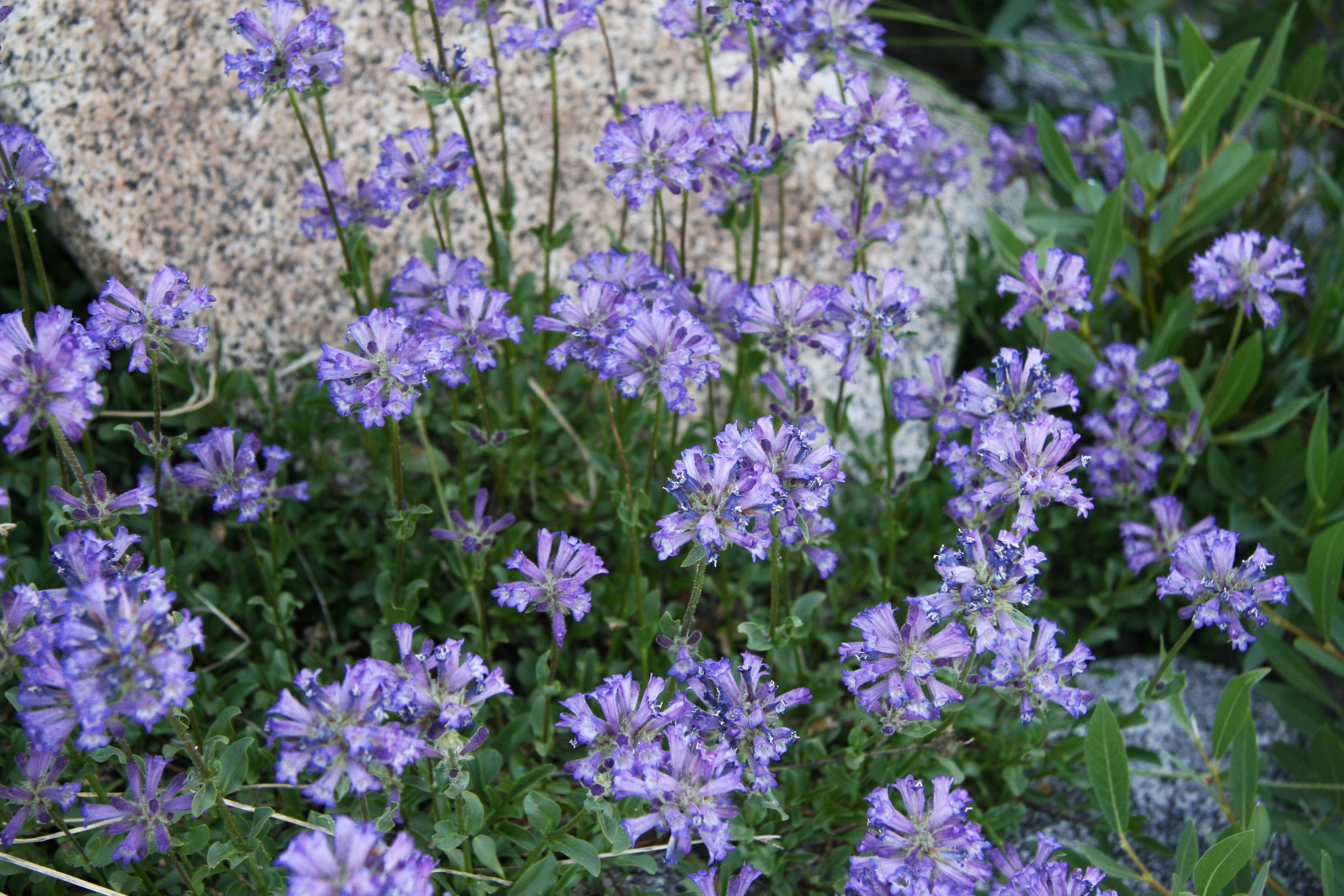
Along path up to Marie Lakes, Ansel Adams Wilderness, California

The inflorescence has one to seven well separated groups of flowers, formally called verticillasters, crowning the stems. Though usually each stem will have at least two flower groups. The flowers face in every direction out from their two cymes, the branches from one attachment point, each with three to eleven flowers.

The flowers are bright to deep blue or purple on spreading lobes of the flowers while the tube is violet to blue-purple, but always lack floral guide lines. They are hairless except for the lower lip of the flower which is white or golden bearded. They usually measure 10 to 16 millimeters long, but can sometimes be as long as 20 mm. The longest pair of the four stamens reaches or extends out of the flower's mouth and the staminode is 6–7 mm long, just reaching the mouth.

Its fruits are hairless capsules that measure 4–5 mm by 3–4 mm wide. They contain numerous small seeds 0.6–1 mm.

== Taxonomy ==
Penstemon rydbergii was scientifically described and named by botanist Aven Nelson in 1898. It is part of the genus Penstemon within the family Plantaginaceae. It has three accepted varieties.

- Penstemon rydbergii var. aggregatus
- Penstemon rydbergii var. oreocharis
- Penstemon rydbergii var. rydbergii

Penstemon rydbergii has 13 synonyms of the species or one of its three varieties.

Table of Synonyms
Name	Year	Rank	Synonym of:	Notes
Penstemon aggregatus Pennell	1920	species	var. aggregatus	≡ hom.
Penstemon attenuatus var. varians A.Nelson	1912	variety	var. rydbergii	= het.
Penstemon ellipticus Greene	1906	species	var. oreocharis	= het., nom. illeg.
Penstemon erosus Rydb.	1901	species	var. rydbergii	= het.
Penstemon lacerellus Greene	1906	species	var. rydbergii	= het.
Penstemon latiusculus Greene	1906	species	var. rydbergii	= het.
Penstemon oreocharis Greene	1906	species	var. oreocharis	≡ hom.
Penstemon productus Greene	1906	species	var. rydbergii	= het.
Penstemon recurvatus A.Heller	1906	species	var. oreocharis	= het.
Penstemon rydbergii subsp. aggregatus (Pennell) D.D.Keck	1945	subspecies	var. aggregatus	≡ hom.
Penstemon rydbergii subsp. typicus D.D.Keck	1945	subspecies	P. rydbergii	≡ hom., not validly publ.
Penstemon rydbergii var. varians (A.Nelson) Cronquist	1959	variety	var. rydbergii	= het.
Penstemon vaseyanus Greene	1906	species	var. oreocharis	= het.
Notes: ≡ homotypic synonym ; = heterotypic synonym

=== Names ===
The species name, rydbergii, was selected by Nelson to honor Per Axel Rydberg. Rydberg was a botanist who traveled widely in the western United States and received his doctorate in botany the same year this species was named for him. It is similarly known by the common names Rydberg's penstemon, Rydberg's meadow penstemon, or Rydberg penstemon. It is also known as meadow penstemon or mountain meadow penstemon.

== Range and habitat ==
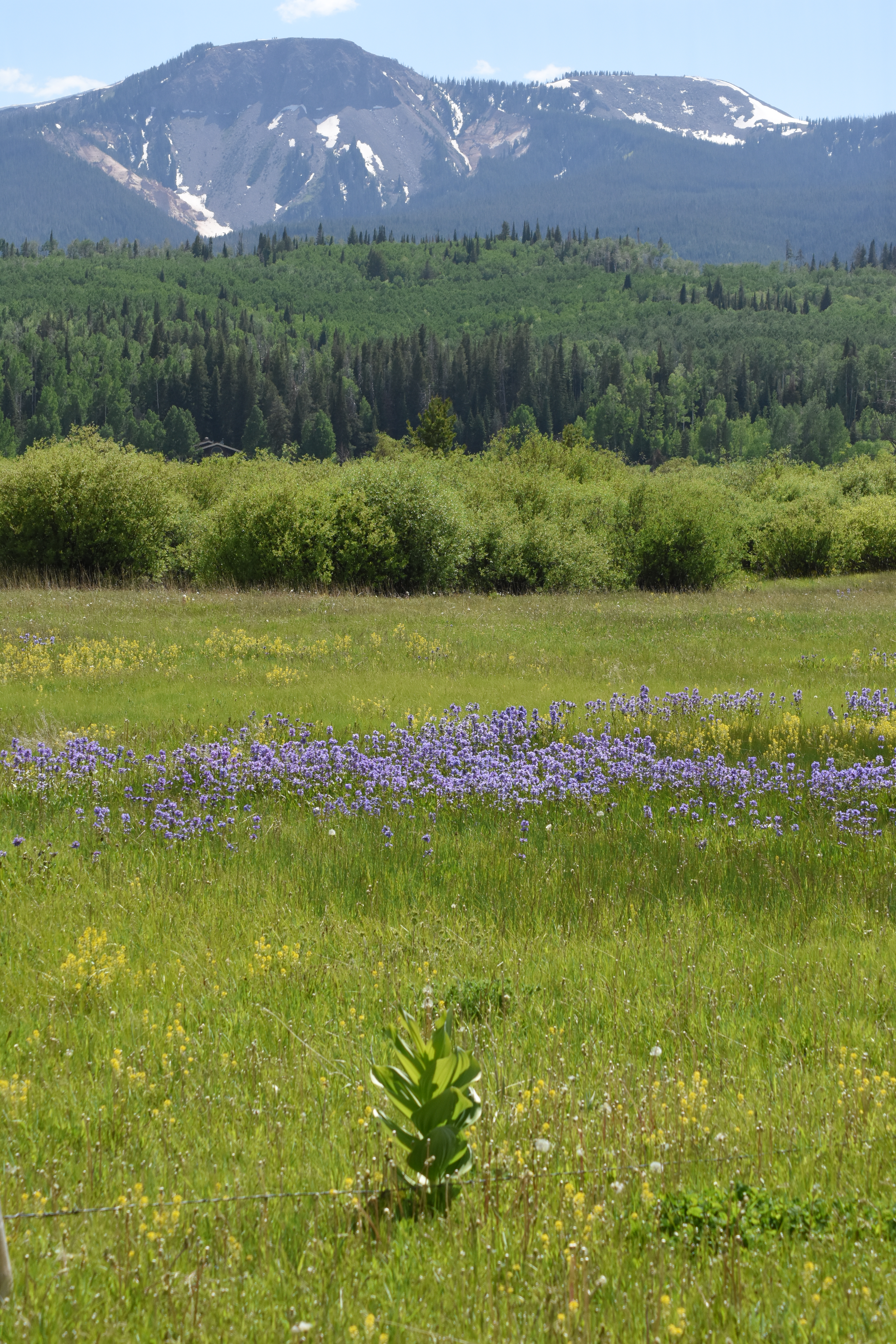
Large patch in a field looking towards Sand Mountain in Elkhead Mountains near Steamboat Lake State Park, Colorado

Meadow penstemons are native to the western United States from the Rocky Mountains to the Pacific States. In New Mexico they are only found in the northern mountainous parts of the state. In Colorado it likewise is known from the western, mountainous portion of the state and is only known from Carbon and Fremont counties in Wyoming. Similarly, it is only recorded in four of the southwestern counties of Montana. It is found in almost all parts of the Great Basin, but is not found in eastern Nevada. It is found in southern Idaho and not the northern panhandle. It generally does not grow west of the Cascade Mountains in Washington and Oregon. In California it grows in the northern Coast Ranges, the Klamath Mountains, and in the higher parts of the Sierra Nevada in the central part of the state.

Most penstemons prefer dry habitats, but the meadow penstemon is usually found in moist places such as near streams or wet meadows.

== Ecology ==
Experimental evidence shows that meadow penstemons increase in areas where the northern pocket gopher (Thomomys talpoides) are active. They often grow more thickly at the edge of areas disturbed by the gophers. They contain iridoids bound as glycosides named euphroside, plantarenaloside, aucubin, and geniposidic acid.

== Cultivation ==
Although small flowered, it is sometimes grown in gardens particularly by people living in areas moist climates. It is propagated by seed and requires twelve weeks of cold-moist stratification for good levels of sprouting.

== See also ==
- List of Penstemon species
