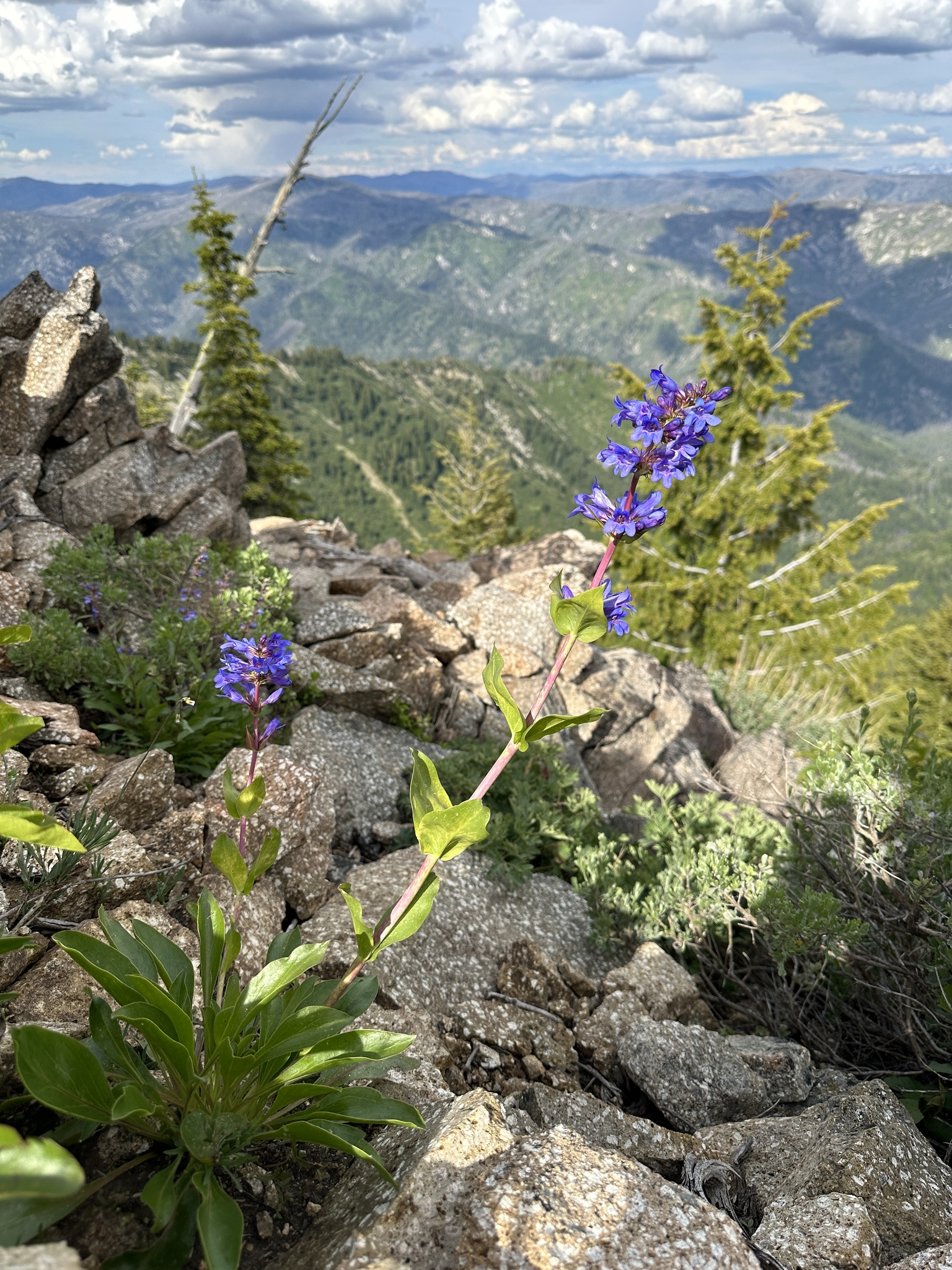
- Boise National Forest, Idaho

Scientific classification
- Kingdom: Plantae
- Clade: Embryophytes
- Clade: Tracheophytes
- Clade: Spermatophytes
- Clade: Angiosperms
- Clade: Eudicots
- Clade: Asterids
- Order: Lamiales
- Family: Plantaginaceae
- Genus: Penstemon
- Species: P. payettensis

Binomial name
- Penstemon payettensis A.Nelson & J.F.Macbr.

= Penstemon payettensis =

Plant species in the veronica family

Penstemon payettensis, the Payette penstemon, is a species in the veronica family from the northwestern United States in Oregon, Idaho, and Montana.

== Description ==
Payette penstemons are herbaceous plants that produce one or more flowering stems that are typically 30 to 70 centimeters (12–28 in) tall, though occasionally only 15 cm (6 in) at full growth. It has a taproot topped by a thick, woody caudex that can have short branches. Both the stems and the leaves are hairless and not glaucous.

The species has both cauline, leaves on its flowering stems, and basal leaves. The lower cauline and basal leaves are ovate to elliptic in shape measuring 8–18 centimeters (3–7 in), though usually not longer than 14 cm (5.5 in), with a width of 1–4 cm (0.5–1.5 in). The stems have five to seven leaf pairs attached to opposite sides, with the upper ones 2.8–11 cm (1–4.5 in) long and 0.6–4.2 cm wide, though more typically 4–8 cm long and less than 3 cm wide.

The flowers are bright blue and usually tinted purple on part of the bloom. The corolla is 1.8–2.2 cm long and does not have floral guide lines. They are typically arranged in four to ten groups on the upper 3–32 cm of the stems, though occasionally as many as 16, with only the lower groups significantly separated from each other. Within each group there are two cymes, each with two to eight flowers, though more often four or less. Blooming can occur from May to August in its native habitat.

== Taxonomy ==
Penstemon payettensis was scientifically described and named by Aven Nelson and James Francis Macbride in 1916. However, in the original publication the species name was spelled payetensis. It was described from a type specimen collected from the Payette National Forest in Idaho in 1912. It is classified in the Penstemon genus within the Plantaginaceae. The species has no subspecies or botanical synonyms.

=== Names ===
Penstemon payettensis is known as Payette penstemon, Payette beardtongue, and Payette's beardtongue, which, like the species name payettensis, derive from where the type specimen was collected in the Payette National Forest.

== Range and habitat ==
The Payette penstemon is native to Oregon, Idaho, and Montana in the northwestern United States. There it grows on the eastern Columbia Plateau and in the northern Rocky Mountains. In Oregon it is known from the northeastern corner of the state in Baker, Union, and Wallowa counties but is much more widespread in southern and central Idaho. Only two populations have been documented in Montana's Bitterroot National Forest in the southwest of the state, Ravalli and Beaverhead counties. It is found at elevations of 1,200 to 2,600 meters (3,900–8,500 ft).

The species grows in dry and open areas on gravelly soils in coniferous forests and hilly sagebrush steppes.

== See also ==
List of Penstemon species
