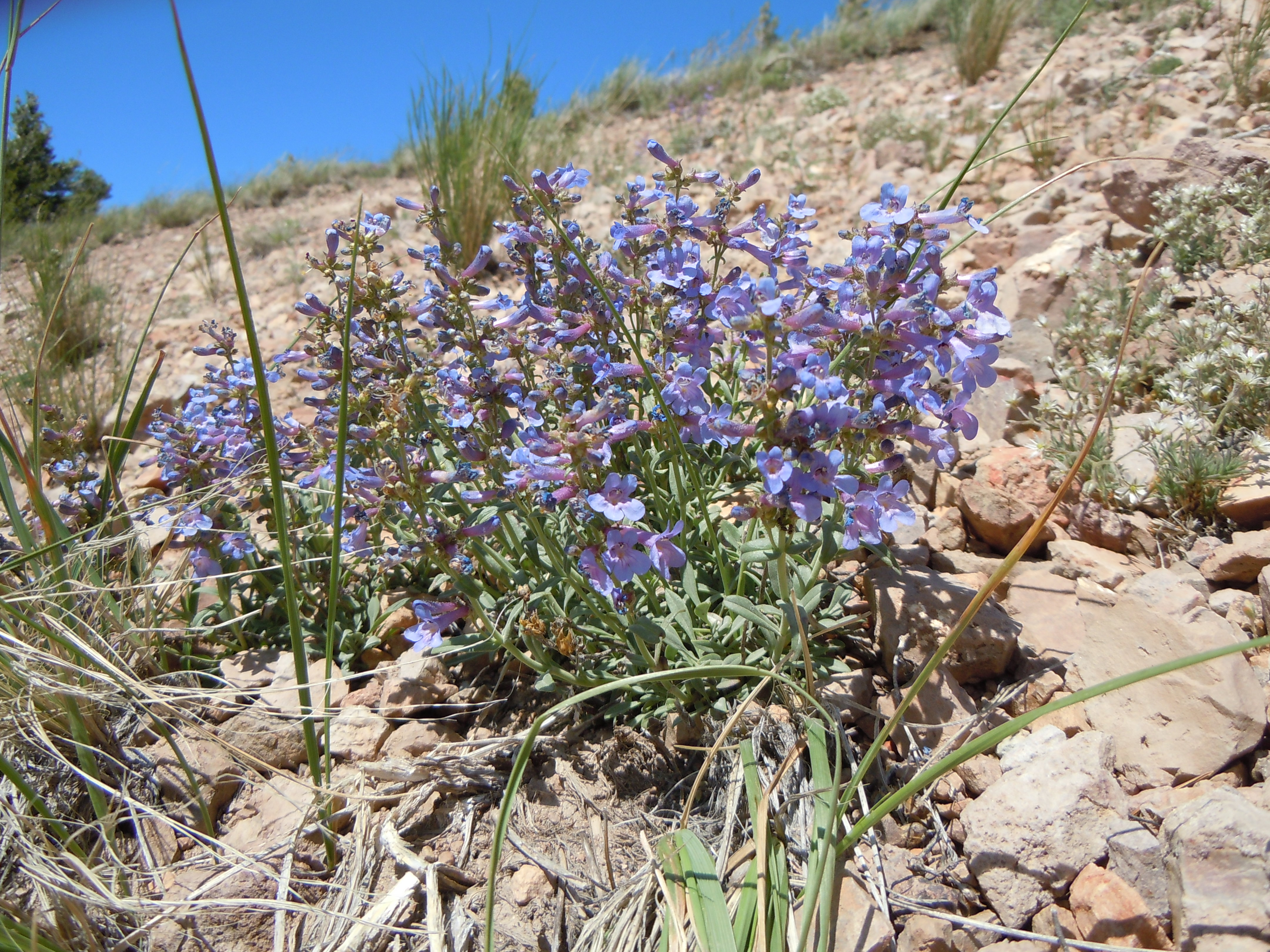

Conservation status
- Secure (NatureServe)

Scientific classification
- Kingdom: Plantae
- Clade: Tracheophytes
- Clade: Angiosperms
- Clade: Eudicots
- Clade: Asterids
- Order: Lamiales
- Family: Plantaginaceae
- Genus: Penstemon
- Species: P. radicosus

Binomial name
- Penstemon radicosus A.Nelson

Synonyms
- Penstemon lineolatus

= Penstemon radicosus =

Plant species in the veronica family

Penstemon radicosus, the matroot penstemon, is a species of plant in the veronica family from the Rocky Mountains and northern Great Basin.

== Description ==
The matroot penstemon has a few to large numbers of stems growing from a woody caudex. They are generally 20 to 42 centimeters (8 to 16.5 in) tall, but on occasion can be as short as 15 cm (6 in). The stems are rather slender; they grow straight upwards or outwards before curving to grow upwards and are puberulent to retrorsely hairy, covered in short fine hair hairs that stand upright or face backwards.

Plants almost never have basal leaves and when they are present they are poorly developed. Each stem will have four to eight leaf pairs attached to opposite sides of the stems, 2–6.5 cm long, though usually at least 3 cm. The width is 0.2 to 2 cm, though usually 0.4–1 cm. Their shape is ovate to lanceolate, like an egg or like the head of a spear, though only narrowly. All the leaves attach directly by their tapering base to the main stem and they are more or less puberulent.

The flowers are blue-purple on their upper side and white on the undersides. They are attached to a 5–14 cm long inflorescence in two to six groups. Each group of flowers having two nodes with two to eight flowers. Blooming can be as early as May or as late as July in its native habitat.

The fruit is a capsule that measures 5–8 millimeters long and 3.5–5 mm wide.

== Taxonomy ==
The botanist Aven Nelson described and gave Penstemon radicosus its scientific name in 1898. It is classified in the genus Penstemon within the wider family Plantaginaceae. It has one heterotypic synonym, a species named Penstemon lineolatus by Edward Lee Greene in 1906 and it has no subspecies. In Botanical Latin radicosus means "with many roots". It is known by the common name of matroot penstemon.

== Range and habitat ==
Matroot penstemons are native to Colorado, Idaho, Montana, Nevada, Utah, and Wyoming. In Colorado they recorded in just two northern counties, Jackson and Moffat. Similarly, it is found in three northern Utah Counties; Daggett, Rich, and Box Elder, but they are widespread in the western two-thirds of Wyoming. In Montana it grows in the southwestern corner of the state and mostly in the southern part of Idaho. In Nevada it is recorded in Elko, Humboldt, and Pershing counties in the northern part of the state. It is found at elevations of 1,500–2,400 meters (4,900–7,900 ft).

Its habitat is slopes, ravines, and rocky flat areas in the Sagebrush steppe or pine woodlands.

== See also ==
List of Penstemon species
