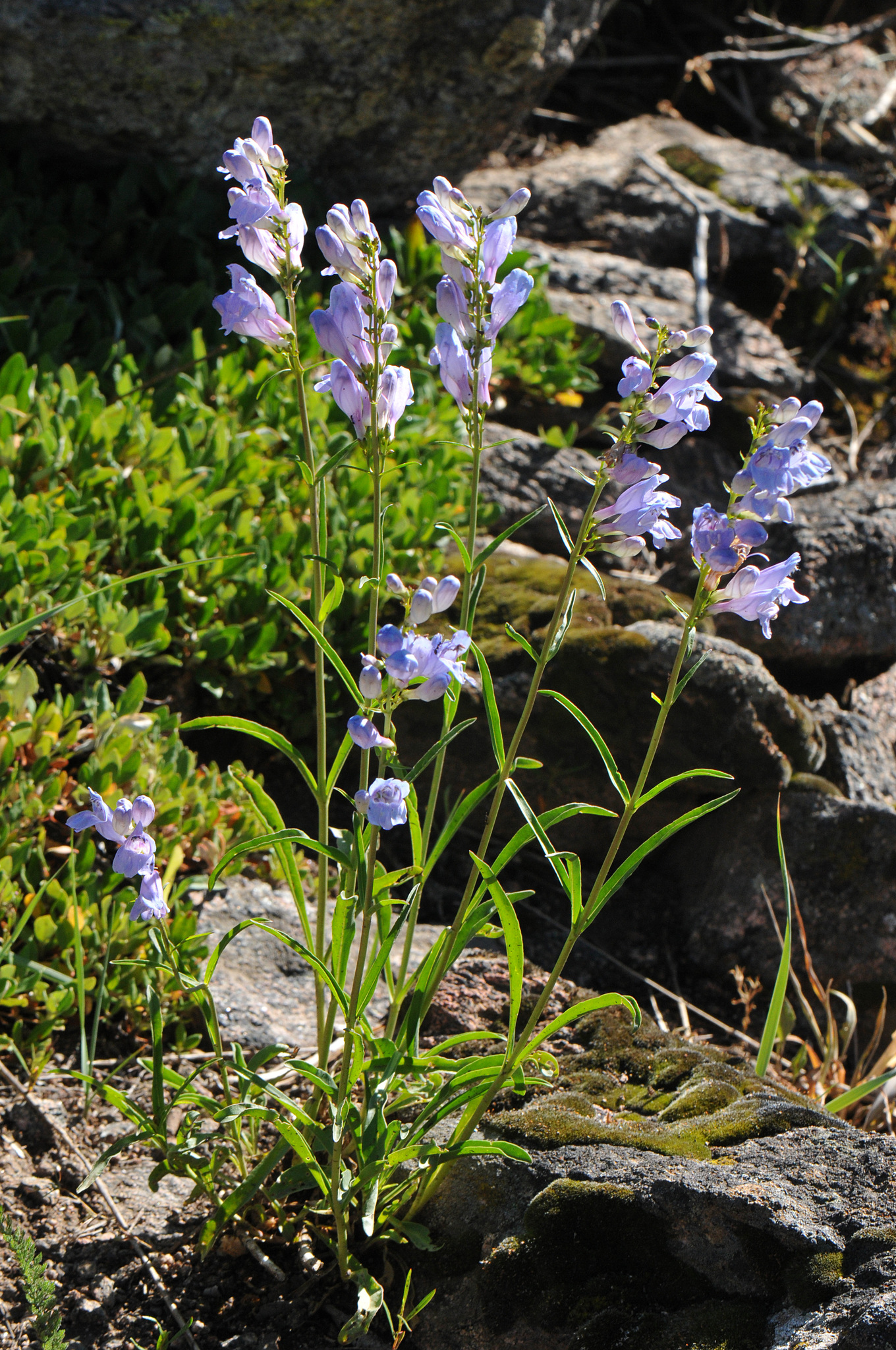
- Routt National Forest

Conservation status
- Secure (NatureServe)

Scientific classification
- Kingdom: Plantae
- Clade: Tracheophytes
- Clade: Angiosperms
- Clade: Eudicots
- Clade: Asterids
- Order: Lamiales
- Family: Plantaginaceae
- Genus: Penstemon
- Species: P. strictus

Binomial name
- Penstemon strictus Benth.

Synonyms
- Penstemon micranthus; Penstemon strictus subsp. angustus

= Penstemon strictus =

Rocky Mountain penstemon

Plant species in the veronica family

Penstemon strictus, more commonly known as the Rocky Mountain penstemon, is a penstemon (common name beardtongue) with showy blue flowers.

== Description ==
Rocky Mountain penstemon is a herbaceous plant with one or more stems that are erect or ascending; growing straight upward or outwards before curving to upright. The stems can be anywhere between 20 and 90 centimeters (8 and 35 in) tall, but more typically are 35 to 70 cm (14 to 28 in). Stems are mostly hairless, but can be somewhat puberulent towards the base or very rarely are quite puberulent, covered in very small erect hairs. However the stems are never glaucous, blue-gray due to a covering of natural waxes. Plants are perennial growing from a branched crown with fibrous roots.

On this species there are both cauline and basal leaves, attached to the stems or directly to the base of the plant. The basal and lower leaves are attached by petioles, leaf stems, while the upper leaves are attached directly to the main stem without a petiole and are usually somewhat shorter, narrower, and are often folded. Leaves lower down on the plant usually measure 5 to 15 centimeters (2 to 6 in) long, but can occasionally be as short as 3 cm (1.2 in), with a normal width of 5 to 16 millimeters and only occasionally as wide as 20 mm.

The leaves might be leathery in texture and all smooth and hairless, except for rough, forward facing hairs on the leaf edges and sometimes somewhat covered in fine hairs towards the base of the leaf, but only rarely clearly puberulent. Like the stems, the leaves are not glaucous. The shape of the leaves is narrow oblanceolate, like a spearhead reversed with the widest part past the midpoint. The stems have four to eight pairs of leaves. The uppermost ones measure 4 to 10 centimeters (1.5 to 4 in) and are just 2 to 10 millimeters in width and can be more like a narrow blade of grass or narrowly oblanceolate.

The inflorescence is a spike (technically a thyrse of 4 to 10 verticillasters). The corolla is 24 to 32 mm (1 to 1.5 inches) long, deep blue with a violet tube, and smooth. The two upper petals point straight along the tube, like a porch roof. The seed capsules are 8 to 13 mm long.

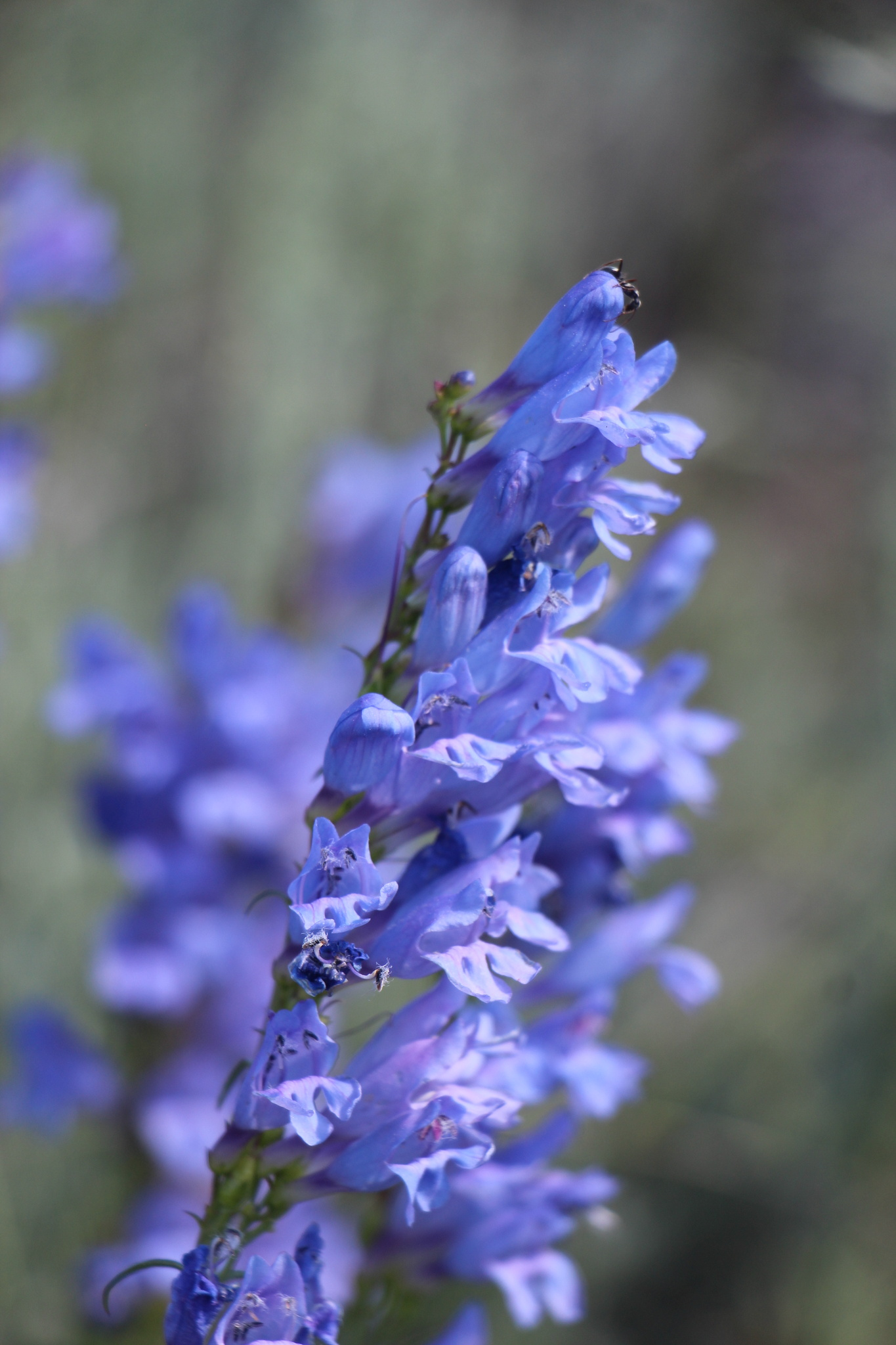
Albany County, Wyoming

== Taxonomy ==
Penstemon strictus was scientifically described and named by the botanist George Bentham in 1846. The species was also scientifically described as Penstemon micranthus by John Torrey in 1845, however this name was already used by Thomas Nuttall in 1834 making this description an illegitimate name despite being considered a botanical synonym of Penstemon procerus var. procerus. Penstemon strictus is classified in the genus Penstemon as part of the family Plantaginaceae. It has no accepted subspecies, but in 1920 a downy (puberulent) form was described as P. strictus subsp. angustus by Francis Whittier Pennell.

=== Names ===
Penstemon strictus is known by the common name Rocky Mountain penstemon for its native habitat on the western slopes of the Rocky Mountains. It is additionally known as the porch penstemon because of the upper two petal lobes projecting forwards like a porch roof. It is also known as the Rocky Mountain beardtongue or stiff beardtongue.

== Distribution and habitat ==
Rocky Mountain penstemon is native to the region from southern Wyoming and western Colorado south to northeastern Arizona and northern New Mexico. There is an isolated population in Mono County, California that appears to be a recent introduction. Likewise, reports from Arapahoe County, Colorado and northeastern New Mexico in Harding and Union counties are also likely human facilitated introductions. The database Plants of the World Online reports it as an established introduced plant in Montana and NatureServe additionally records it growing in the Canadian province of Alberta. They are found at elevations of 1,700 to 3,500 meters (5,600 to 11,500 ft).

It is found in piñon-juniper woods, with scrub oak, or in open areas in ponderosa pine and spruce-aspen forest, often associated with sagebrush.

== Ecology ==
In studies of the Rocky Mountain penstemon in the mountains of Colorado bumblebees were the most frequent visitors with a single flower receiving between 100 and 200 stops each day. Most bumblebees seek nectar from the flowers, but the two-form bumblebee (Bombus bifarius) treats the flowers differently. They turn upside down in the flowers and 'buzz' pollen out of the flowers by vibrating their flight muscles while gripping the anthers. Hummingbirds also stopped by the flowers near daybreak, but do not frequent the flowers. Small mason bees (Osmia) and pollen wasps in Pseudomasaris also drop by the flowers at low frequencies.

== Cultivation ==
Because of its combination of showy flowers, tolerance for drought, and hardiness, Rocky Mountain penstemon is often grown as an ornamental plant in dry regions. It is planted in xeriscape gardens, in naturalistic meadows, and is also frequently used for revegetation of roadsides by state highway departments in the United States.

It has less particular requirements for dry or well drained soil than many other penstemon species. Plants are most frequently propagated by seed, though root division is also successful. The seeds show some need for cool moist stratification, with greater germination after being kept at 4 °C (40 °F) for two to three months. The seeds also tend to sprout more frequently when exposed to light near the soil surface. Germination occurs when temperatures reach 16 °C (60 °F) for one to two weeks.

It is hardy in USDA zones 2–9.

== See also ==
List of Penstemon species
