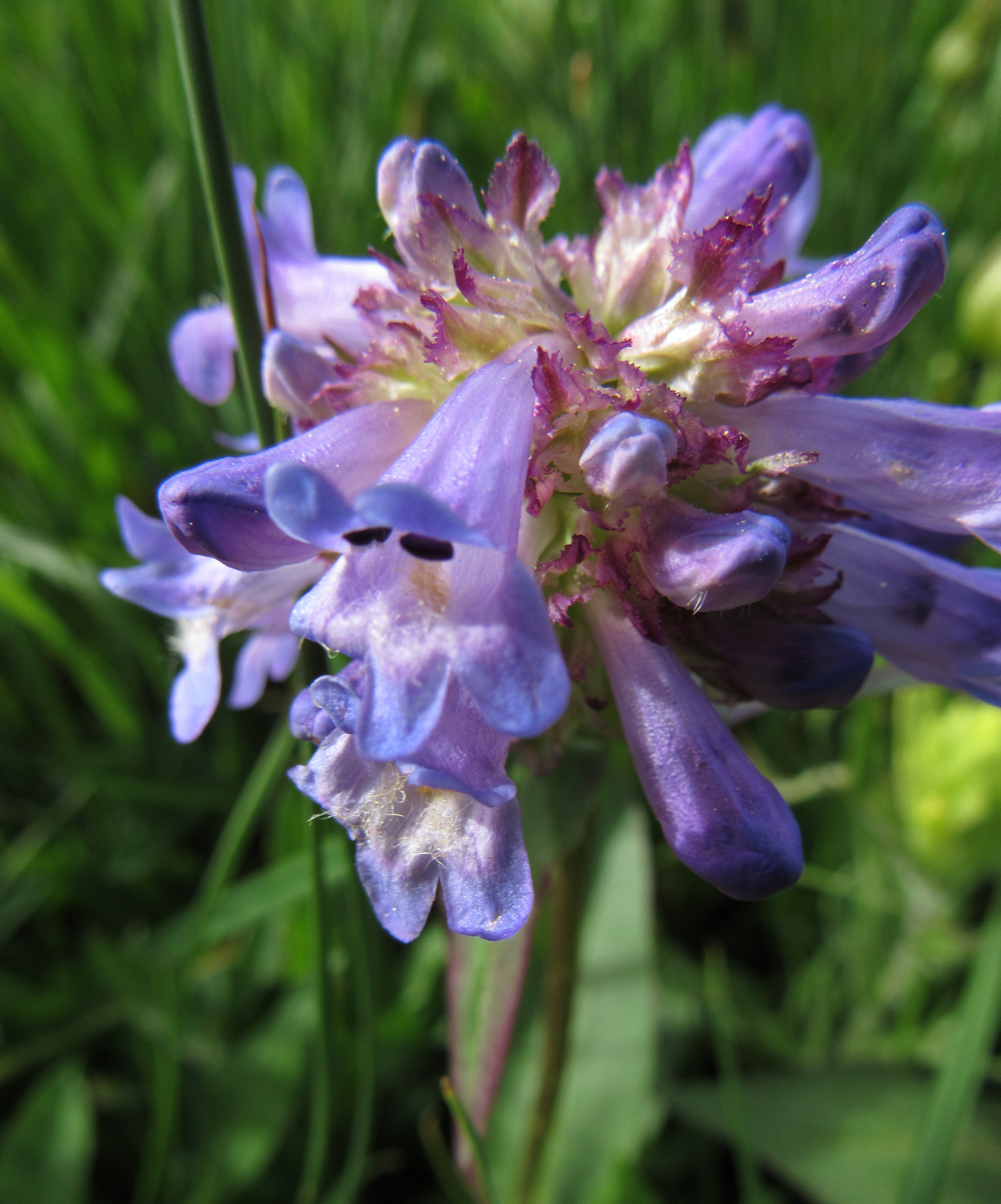
- Land of the Yankee Fork State Park, Idaho

Conservation status
- Apparently Secure (NatureServe)

Scientific classification
- Kingdom: Plantae
- Clade: Tracheophytes
- Clade: Angiosperms
- Clade: Eudicots
- Clade: Asterids
- Order: Lamiales
- Family: Plantaginaceae
- Genus: Penstemon
- Species: P. globosus

Binomial name
- Penstemon globosus (Piper) Pennell & D.D.Keck

Synonyms
- Penstemon confertus var. globosus

= Penstemon globosus =

Plant species in the veronica family

Penstemon globosus, the globe penstemon, is a species in the veronica family from the northwestern United States of America.

== Description ==
Globe penstemons are largely herbaceous plants that with a mass of leaves resembling a low tuft of grass that sprout from a woody rhizome-caudex. From this sprout flowering stems that are usually 20 to 65 centimeters (8–25.5 in) tall, but can be just 10 cm (4 in). They are not glaucous and are often hairless, but can have a sparse covering of stiff, backwards pointing hairs towards the tops.

The lowest leaves on the flowering stems and the basal leaves are typically 2.8–16 centimeters (1.1–6.3 in) long, but in exceptional cases can be as much as 23.5 cm (9.3 in). Each flowering stem has two to five pairs of leaves attached to opposite sides.

The flowers are various shades of blue, purple, or violet and lack floral guide lines.

== Taxonomy ==
In 1900 Charles Vancouver Piper scientifically described a variety of Penstemon confertus which he named globosus. This variety was reevaluated by Francis Whittier Pennell and David D. Keck in 1940 and reclassified as the species Penstemon globosus. It is part of the Penstemon genus which is classified in the Plantaginaceae family.

=== Names ===
In Botanical Latin the species name globosus means 'globe'. It is similarly known as the globe penstemon or globe beardtongue.

== Range and habitat ==
Globe penstemons are native to three states in the northwestern United States, Oregon, Idaho, and Montana. In Oregon it grows in Crook, Harney, Baker, Union, and Wallowa counties in the eastern parts of the state. The species is common in northern and central Idaho, but only grows in a few counties in the south. In Montana it is native to the southwestern mountains, but there are observations of the species to the east. It can be found at elevations of 800–3,100 meters (2,600–10,200 ft). Their habitat are subalpine meadows with moderate moisture.

== See also ==
List of Penstemon species
