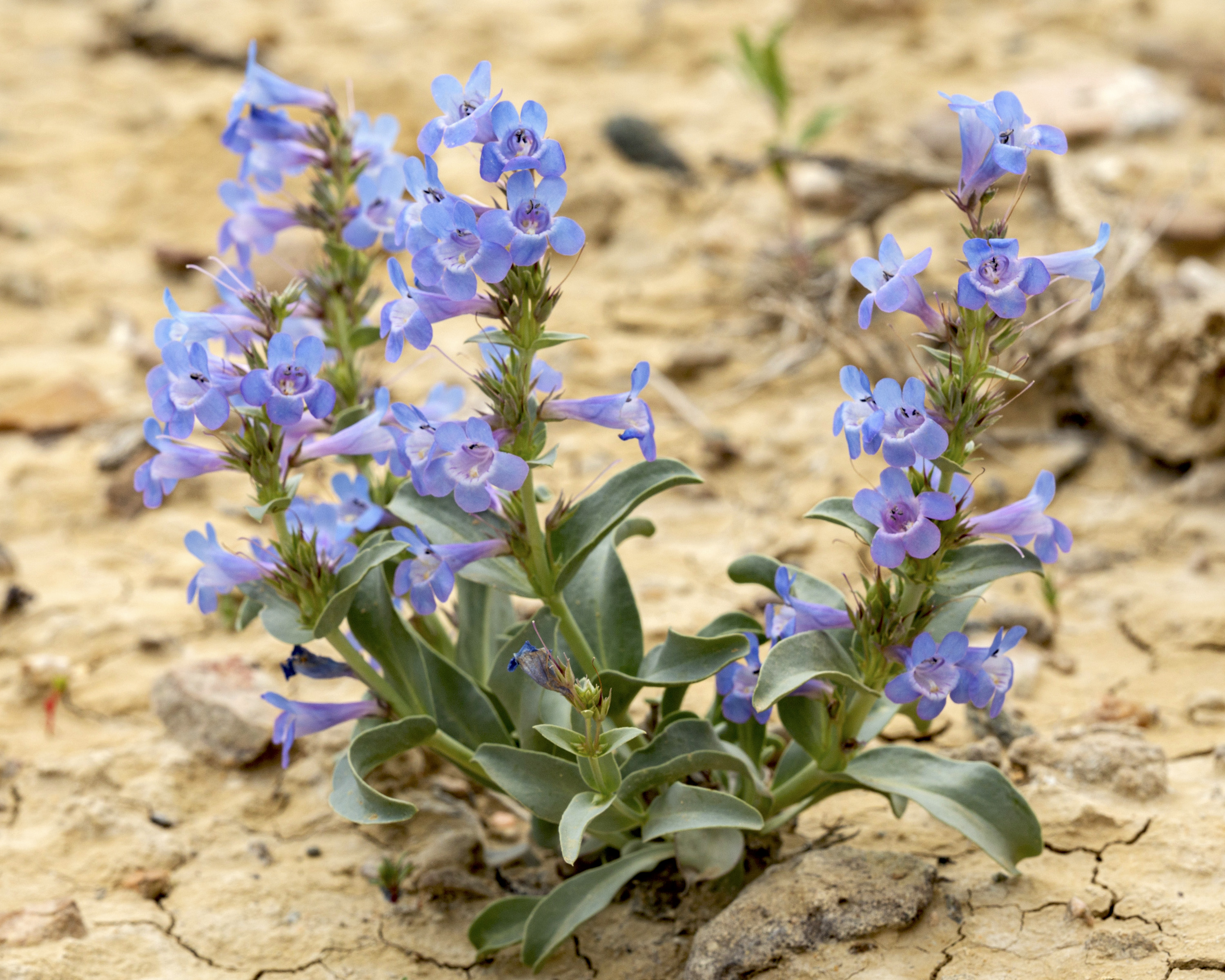
- South side of the Bridger Mountains, Fremont County, Wyoming

Conservation status
- Secure (NatureServe)

Scientific classification
- Kingdom: Plantae
- Clade: Tracheophytes
- Clade: Angiosperms
- Clade: Eudicots
- Clade: Asterids
- Order: Lamiales
- Family: Plantaginaceae
- Genus: Penstemon
- Species: P. nitidus

Binomial name
- Penstemon nitidus Douglas ex Benth.

Varieties
- P. n. var. nitidus; P. n. var. polyphyllus

Synonyms
- List: Penstemon nitidus var. major; Penstemon nitidus subsp. polyphyllus; Penstemon nitidus subsp. typicus

= Penstemon nitidus =

Plant species in the veronica family

Penstemon nitidus, commonly the waxleaf penstemon, is a plant in the veronica family from the northern United States and western Canada.

== Description ==
Waxleaf penstemons are a herbaceous species a woody caudex atop a taproot that often forms a low tuft of leaves. The flowering stems are often 9 to 40 centimeters (3.5–15.5 in) tall, though can be just 5 cm (2 in) at full height. The rather stout stems, like the leaves, are hairless and glaucous, covered in natural waxes giving them a blue-green color. The taproot repeatedly branches to the point that the main stem is no longer visible after a short distance.

Plants have both basal leaves and ones attached to the flowering stems. The lowest of the stem leaves and the basal ones are 1.5–14 centimeters (0.5–5.5 in) long and 0.2–2.7 cm wide with a shape that varies between spatulate, oblanceolate, or lanceolate. The stems will usually have two to six leaf pairs, though usually not more than four.

The flowers are typically light to medium blue, but very rarely can be in shades of white to red, and have a tubular shape that opens to and upper and lower lip. The upper lip is split into two lobes and the lower into three.

Its appearance is very similar to sand-dune penstemon (Penstemon acuminatus), but it grows in different habitats with no overlap in their ranges.

== Taxonomy ==
In 1846 the botanist George Bentham scientifically described a new species in the genus Penstemon which he named Penstemon nitidus, attributing the species to David Douglas. The type specimen was collected by Douglas in an area he named the "Red Deer and Eagle Hills" near the Saskatchewan River. The species is classified with its genus in the Plantaginaceae family and has two accepted varieties.

- Penstemon nitidus var. nitidus – Western Canada and north central United States
- Penstemon nitidus var. polyphyllus – Native to Idaho and Montana

Besides its accepted varieties it has another variety and two subspecies that are synonyms.

Table of Synonyms
Name	Year	Rank	Synonym of:	Notes
Penstemon nitidus var. major Benth.	1846	variety	var. nitidus	= het.
Penstemon nitidus subsp. polyphyllus Pennell	1942	subspecies	var. polyphyllus	≡ hom.
Penstemon nitidus subsp. typicus Pennell	1942	subspecies	P. nitidus	≡ hom., not validly publ.
Notes: ≡ homotypic synonym; = heterotypic synonym

=== Names ===
The species name,, nitidus, means "shining" or "handsome" in Botanical Latin. Penstemon nitidus is known by the group of related common names waxleaf penstemon, wax-leaved penstemon, waxleaf beardtongue, or wax-leaved beardtongue. It is also sometimes known as the shining penstemon.

== Range and habitat ==
Waxleaf penstemons are native to all four provinces of western Canada and to five central states in the northern US. In British Columbia the species is only found in the southeastern corner of the province and it is likewise only in the westernmost edge of Manitoba, but grows in the southern quarter of Alberta and Saskatchewan. In the United States the species is only recorded in two counties in Idaho, Custer and Lemhi. To the east in Montana it grows in almost every county, but only in the western half of North Dakota. Its range extends to the northwestern corner of South Dakota and the north central areas of Wyoming.

== See also ==
List of Penstemon species
