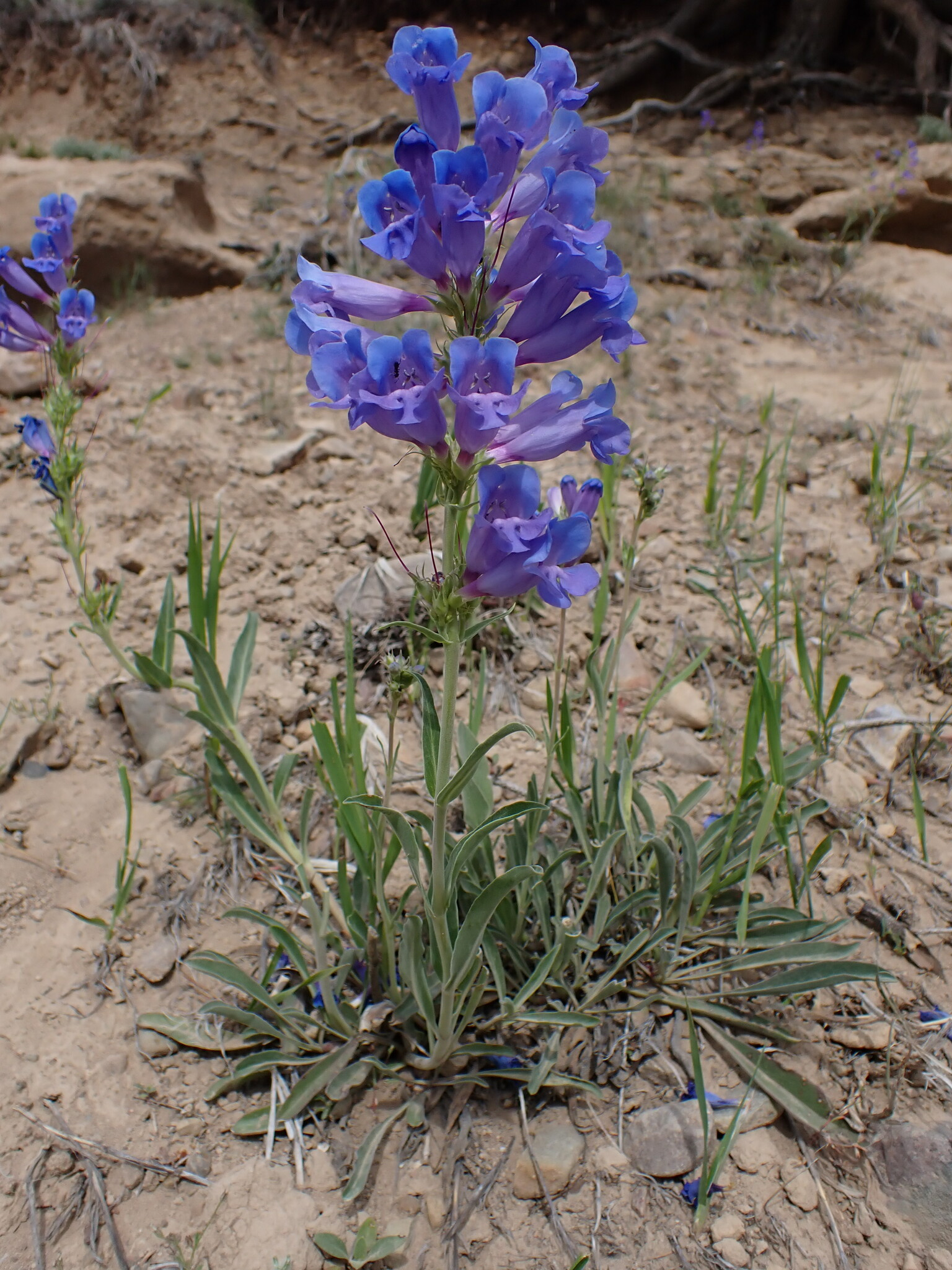
- Near the summit of Bannack Pass, Lemhi County, Idaho

Conservation status
- Vulnerable (NatureServe)

Scientific classification
- Kingdom: Plantae
- Clade: Tracheophytes
- Clade: Angiosperms
- Clade: Eudicots
- Clade: Asterids
- Order: Lamiales
- Family: Plantaginaceae
- Genus: Penstemon
- Species: P. lemhiensis

Binomial name
- Penstemon lemhiensis (D.D.Keck) D.D.Keck & Cronquist

Synonyms
- Penstemon speciosus subsp. lemhiensis

= Penstemon lemhiensis =

Plant species in the veronica family

Penstemon lemhiensis, also the Lemhi penstemon, is a rare plant of the Veronica family that grows in the mountains of Montana and Idaho.

== Description ==
Lemhi penstemons are herbaceous plants that produce one or more rosettes of basal leaves and one flowering stem from each rosette. The flowering stems grow straight upwards or lean out from the base of the plant before growing upwards to lengths of 25 to 80 centimeters (9.8–31.5 in) and are not covered in glaucous natural waxes, but are covered in small, stiff, backwards pointing hairs.

The leaves are attached both to the base of the plants and to their stems and are, like the stems, retrorsely hairy, but are not leathery in texture or glaucous. The lower leaves of the stems and the basal leaves are typically 5–16 centimeters (2–6.5 in) long and 0.8–2.4 cm wide with an oblanceolate to lanceolate shape, though on occasion can be as short as 3.5 cm (1.4 in) or as narrow as 0.5 cm. The flowering stems will have four to eight leaf pairs attached to opposite sides by a short petiole or directly by the base of the leaf. The upper leaves are 2.5–8.5 cm long and 0.6–1.5 cm wide, rarely 12.5 cm long. They have an elliptic to lanceolate shape with a narrow point, only rarely with a wide point.

The flowers are dark blue to violet and do not have floral guide lines. The fused funnel shaped petals have a length of 2.5–3.5 cm and are hairless both inside and out and have two ridges on the lower side. Both the stamens and the staminode do not extend out of the flower's opening. The staminode is hairless and 1.4–1.6 cm long.

== Taxonomy ==
Penstemon lemhiensis was initially described as a subspecies of Penstemon speciosus by David D. Keck in 1940. He described it using specimens collected by Ray F. Blair, the type on 1 July 1937 on Granite Mountain. It was reclassified as a species in 1957 by Keck working with Arthur Cronquist. It has no other synonyms and is classified in the Penstemon genus as part of the Plantaginaceae family.

=== Names ===
The species name, lemhiensis, references Lemhi County, Idaho. It is similarly known as the Lemhi penstemon and Lemhi beardtongue.

== Range and habitat ==
Although named for Lemhi County in Idaho, the species is native to more counties to the east in Montana. There it has been found in the mountainous southwestern counties of Beaverhead, Ravalli, Deer Lodge, and Silver Bow. However, estimates of the number of occurrences in both states are similar with 101 in Idaho and 100 in Montana. The species grows at elevations of 1,200 to 2,500 meters (3,900–8,200 ft). It is a regional endemic species that grows over a range of 5,000 to 20,000 square kilometers (1,900–7,700 sq mi).

=== Conservation ===
Lemhi penstemons were evaluated by NatureServe in 2018 and rated vulnerable at the global leval (G3) as well as at the state level (S3) in both Montana and Idaho.

== Ecology ==
Although other species of insect visit Lemhi penstemons, the large pollen wasp (Pseudomasaris vespoides) is a particularly effective pollinator. Its body exactly fits the size of the flowers. The large pollen wasp behaves in a fashion more like a bee, feeding on nectar and collecting pollen.

== See also ==
List of Penstemon species
