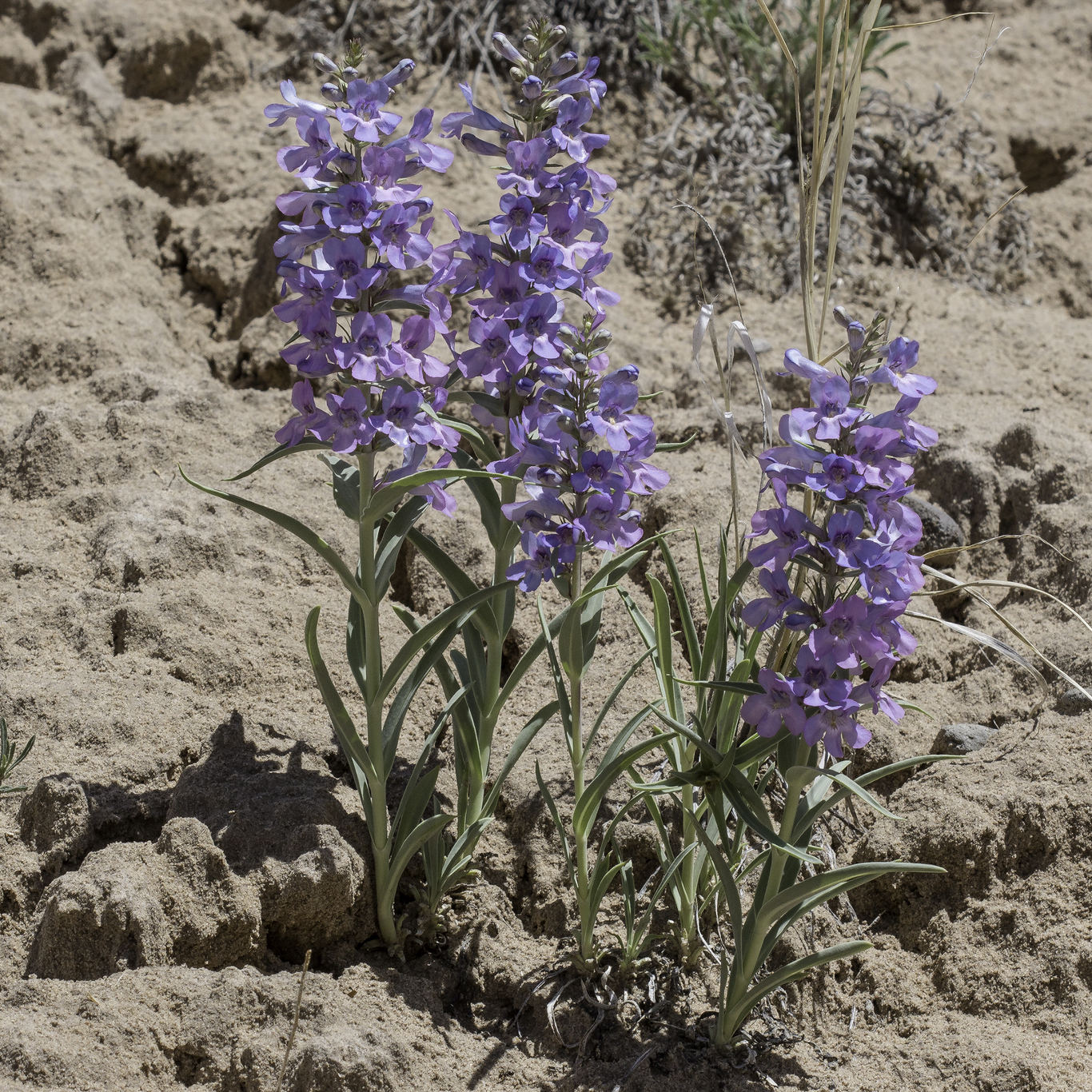
- Flowering Santa Fe National Forest, Rio Arriba County, New Mexico

Scientific classification
- Kingdom: Plantae
- Clade: Tracheophytes
- Clade: Angiosperms
- Clade: Eudicots
- Clade: Asterids
- Order: Lamiales
- Family: Plantaginaceae
- Genus: Penstemon
- Species: P. angustifolius

Binomial name
- Penstemon angustifolius Nutt. ex Pursh

Varieties
- P. angustifolius var. angustifolius; P. angustifolius var. caudatus (A.Heller) Rydb.; P. angustifolius var. dulcis Neese; P. angustifolius var. venosus (D.D.Keck) N.H.Holmgren; P. angustifolius var. vernalensis N.H.Holmgren

Synonyms
- Penstemon caeruleus Nutt.

= Penstemon angustifolius =

Plant species in the plantain family

Penstemon angustifolius is a perennial semi-evergreen forb belonging to the plantain family. This species is 1 out of roughly 273 species of Penstemon. This species is also known as broadbeard beardtongue. This forb is native to the central United States and can be noticed by its brightly and highly variable colored flowers.

== Description ==
Penstemon angustifolius is a herbaceous plant that can grow between 6 and 65 centimeters (2 and 26 in), but more often is 15 to 45 cm (6 to 18 in) tall. The stems are thick, waxy, and gray-green with somewhat woody bases.

Their basal leaves, those springing directly from the base of the plant, range from 25–90 millimeters in length and 2–18 mm in width, though they are usually longer than 40 mm. They have a leathery feel with a smooth, hairless surface, though occasionally they may be rough in texture. Leaf shapes vary between spatulate, spoon shaped, oblanceolate, like the head of a spear with a tapered base and end, or linear, narrow like a grass blade. The lowest cauline leaves, those attached to the stems, are similar to the basal leaves. The flowers can be a range of colors, from pink and blue to lavender which bloom from April to June.

== Distribution and habitat ==
This species is found in the west-central United States extending from Montana and North Dakota to Arizona, New Mexico, and Kansas. They can be found in the Great Plains and the Rocky Mountains. They are drought tolerant and live in sandy soil with good drainage. These plants grow near each other in groups that can be found at elevations of 1200–2200 m.

== Taxonomy ==
Penstemon angustifolius was scientifically described and named by Frederick Traugott Pursh, who credited Thomas Nuttall in his publication. It is classified as a Penstemon in the Plantaginaceae family and has five accepted varieties.

- Penstemon angustifolius var. angustifolius – From Colorado, Wyoming, Nebraska, North Dakota, South Dakota, and Montana
- Penstemon angustifolius var. caudatus – Colorado, Kansas, Nebraska, New Mexico, Oklahoma, South Dakota, Wyoming
- Penstemon angustifolius var. dulcis – Utah
- Penstemon angustifolius var. venosus – Arizona, Colorado, New Mexico, and Utah
- Penstemon angustifolius var. vernalensis – Colorado and Utah

=== Synonyms ===
Penstemon angustifolius has 7 synonyms of the species or three of its varieties.

Table of Synonyms
Name	Year	Rank	Synonym of:	Notes
Chelone angustifolia Steud.	1821	species	var. angustifolius	= het., not validly publ.
Chelone caerulea Spreng.	1825	species	var. angustifolius	= het.
Penstemon angustifolius subsp. caudatus (A.Heller) D.D.Keck	1939	subspecies	var. caudatus	≡ hom.
Penstemon angustifolius subsp. venosus D.D.Keck	1939	subspecies	var. venosus	≡ hom.
Penstemon caeruleus Nutt.	1818	species	P. angustifolius	≡ hom., nom. illeg., nom. superfl.
Penstemon caudatus A.Heller	1898	species	var. caudatus	≡ hom.
Penstemon venosus (D.D.Keck) Reveal	1974	species	var. venosus	≡ hom.
Notes: ≡ homotypic synonym; = heterotypic synonym

== Ecology ==
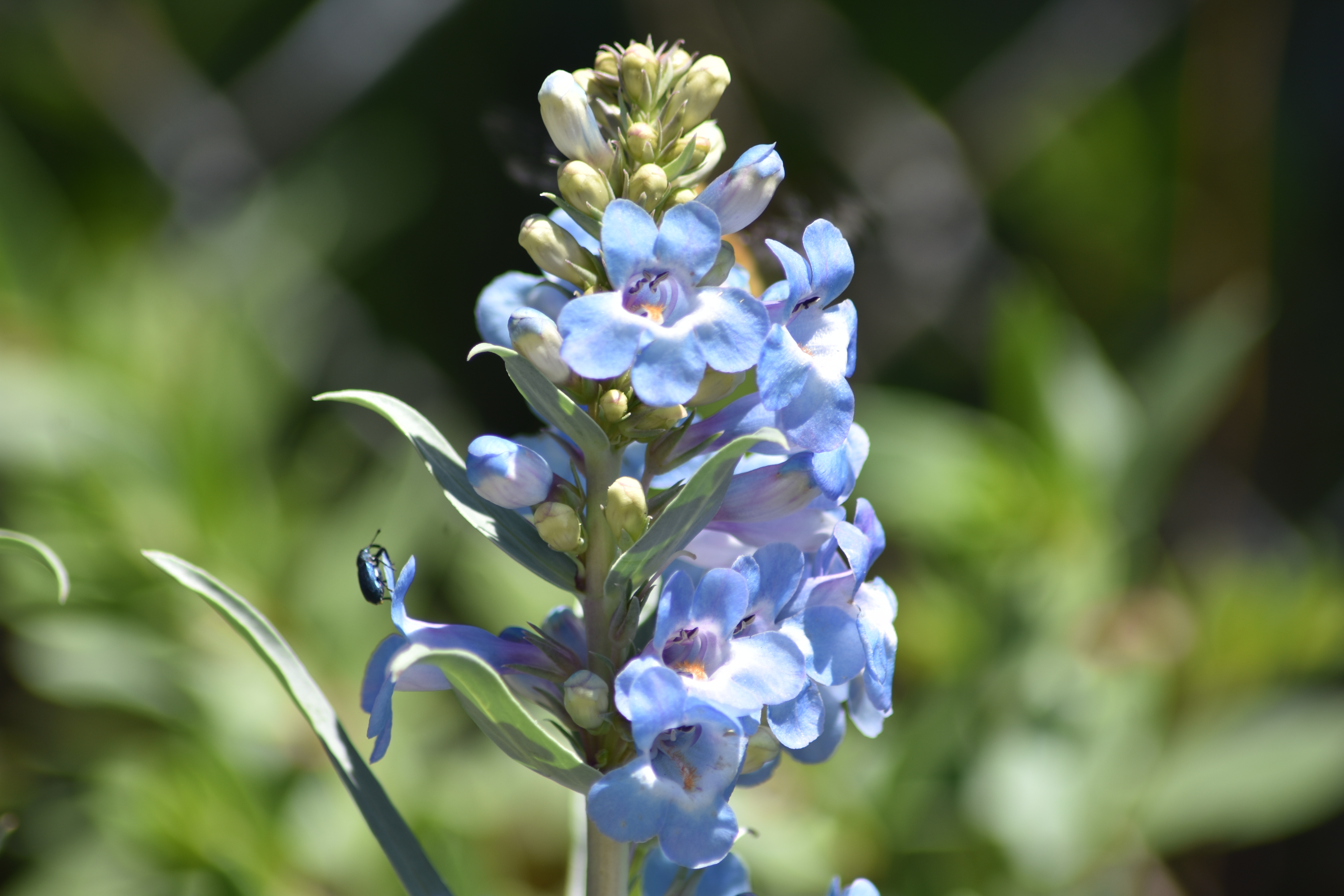
Penstemon angustifolius with beetle on petal.

This plant is useful in preventing wind erosion in its native environment. Deer and insects are known to eat parts of the penstemon plant. Native bees especially enjoy this plant and the seeds are used by birds, rodents, ants and bees. Penstemon weevils are an observed herbivore of this plant.

== Culture and use ==
Penstemon angustifolius have been cultivated as early as the 1800s. Native Americans have been recorded to use the plant roots medicinally. Additionally the pigment from the petals has been used to paint moccasins by the Lokota. This plant can be used in landscaping and as a garden plant in xeriscaping situations.

== See also ==
List of Penstemon species
