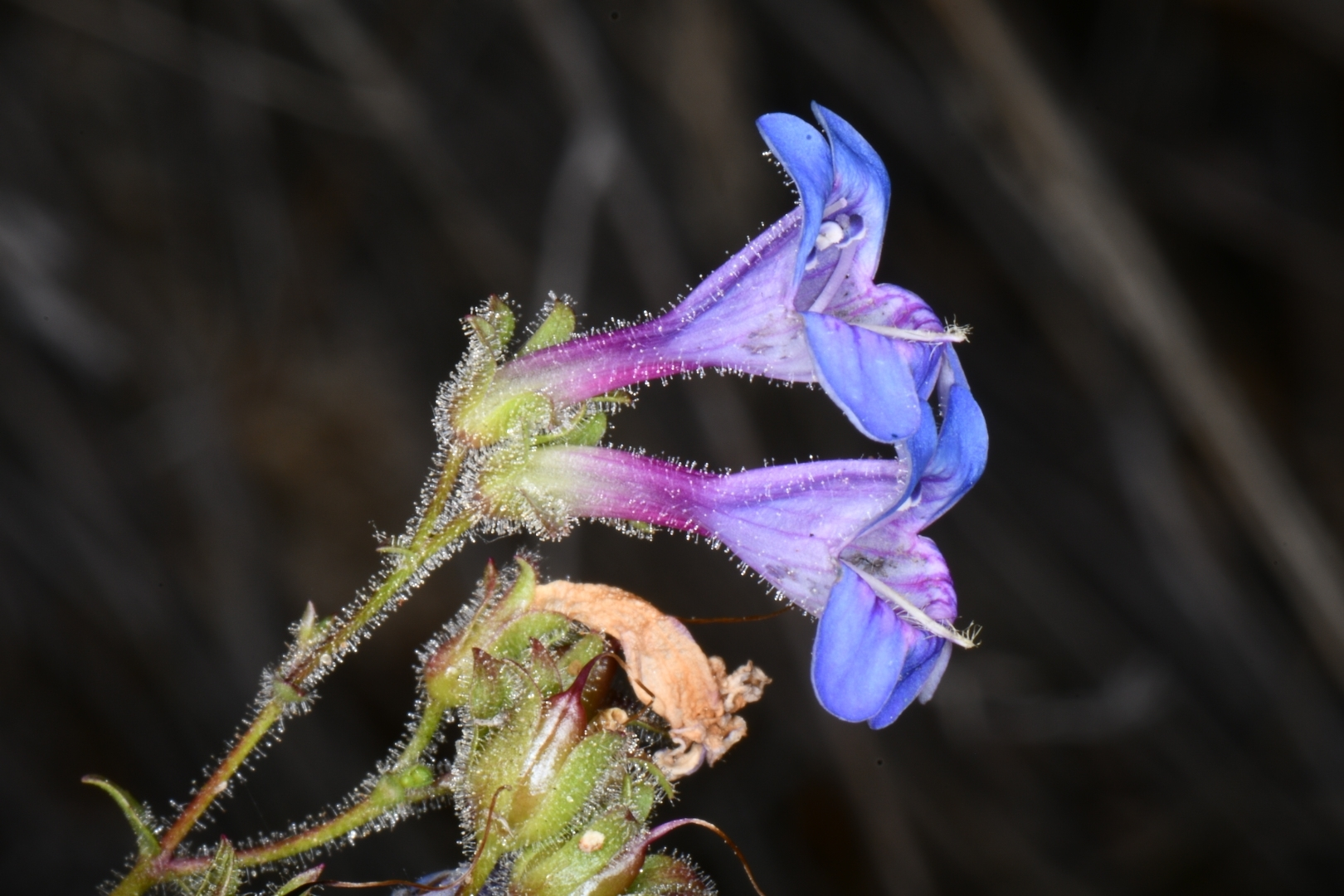
- In Frank Church–River of No Return Wilderness

Scientific classification
- Kingdom: Plantae
- Clade: Embryophytes
- Clade: Tracheophytes
- Clade: Spermatophytes
- Clade: Angiosperms
- Clade: Eudicots
- Clade: Asterids
- Order: Lamiales
- Family: Plantaginaceae
- Genus: Penstemon
- Species: P. diphyllus

Binomial name
- Penstemon diphyllus Rydb.

Synonyms
- Penstemon triphyllus subsp. diphyllus

= Penstemon diphyllus =

Plant species in the veronica family

Penstemon diphyllus, the twin-leaved penstemon, is a species in the veronica family from the northwestern United States in Washington, Idaho, and Montana.

== Taxonomy ==
Penstemon diphyllus was scientifically described and named in 1900 by Per Axel Rydberg. He placed the species in the Penstemon genus which is classified in the Plantaginaceae family. Though listed as an accepted species by Plants of the World Online, it was described as a subspecies of Penstemon triphyllus by David D. Keck in 1932. The species has no subspecies.

=== Names ===
Penstemon diphyllus is known by the common names twin-leaved penstemon, twoleaf beardtongue, and less frequently mintleaf penstemon.

== Range and habitat ==
Twin-leaved penstemons are native to the US states of Washington, Idaho, and Montana. In Washington state it is only recorded as occurring in Whitman County on the eastern edge of the state. It grows in many of the counties in central Idaho, but only in counties along the Western edge of Montana. It occurs at elevations of 1,000 to 2,300 meters (3,300–7,500 ft).

== See also ==
List of Penstemon species
