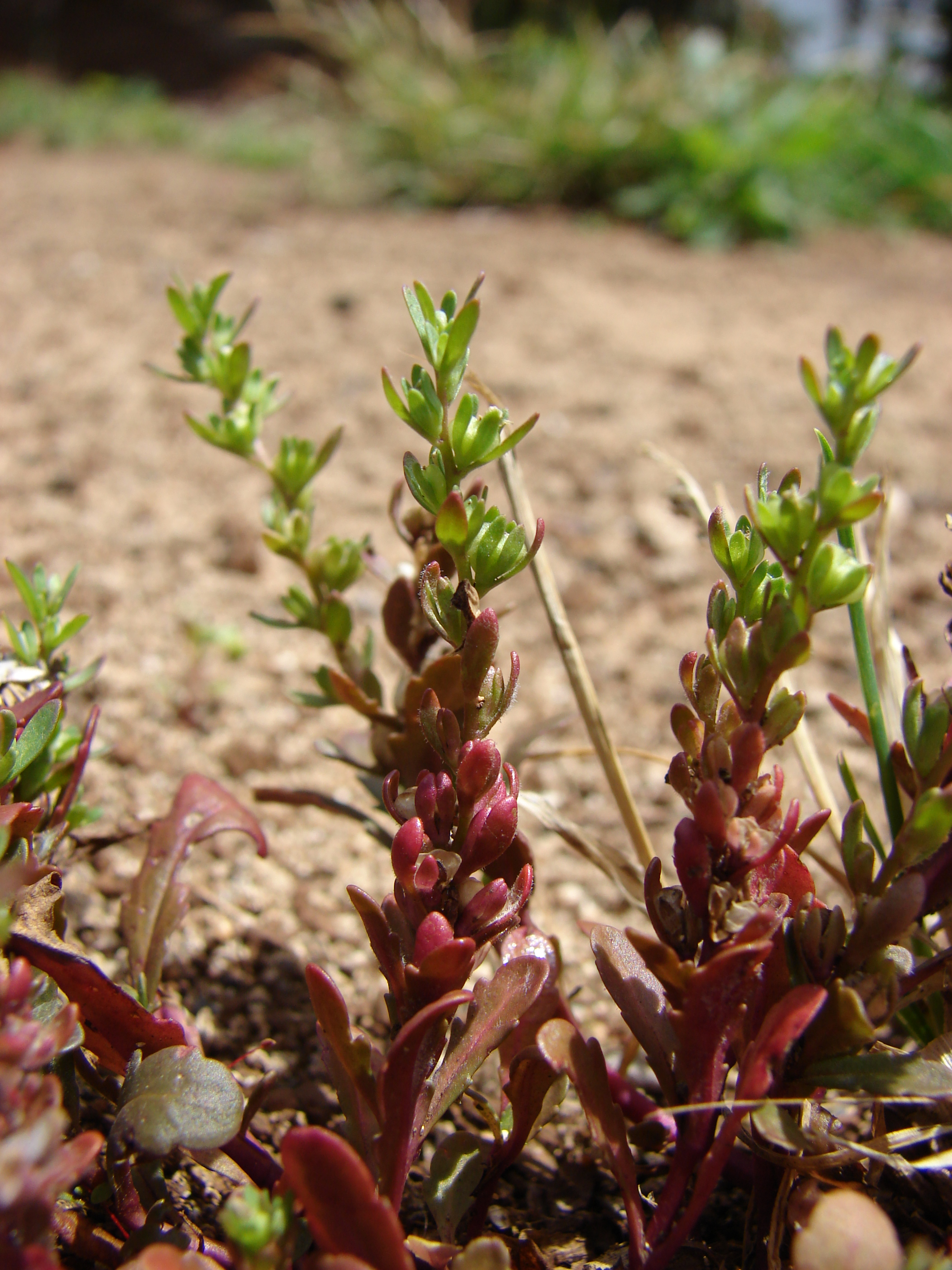

Scientific classification
- Kingdom: Plantae
- Clade: Tracheophytes
- Clade: Angiosperms
- Clade: Eudicots
- Clade: Asterids
- Order: Lamiales
- Family: Plantaginaceae
- Genus: Veronica
- Species: V. peregrina

Binomial name
- Veronica peregrina L.

= Veronica peregrina =

Species of flowering plant

Veronica peregrina is a species of flowering plant in the plantain family known by several common names including neckweed, American speedwell, purslane speedwell and hairy purslane speedwell. It is native to the Americas, and is known on other continents as an introduced species and a common weed. It can be weedy in its native range as well, growing on roadsides, on fields, and in other disturbed habitat. It is an annual herb growing from a taproot. The two subspecies are defined generally on the basis of hairiness: ssp. xalapensis is coated in glandular hairs and ssp. peregrina is a hairless variety. The plant produces erect stems up to about 30 cm (12 in) tall. The leaves vary in shape from linear to lance-shaped to spoon-shaped with smooth or serrated edges; the lower leaves are borne on petioles. The inflorescence is a loose terminal raceme of flowers and lance-shaped bracts. The flowers are generally white and 2 to 3 mm (3/32 to 1/8 in) wide.

== Taxonomy ==
Veronica peregrina was given its scientific name in 1753 by Carl Linnaeus. It part of the genus Veronica, which is classified in the Plantaginaceae family. It has no accepted subspecies but has two among its 21 synonyms.

Table of Synonyms
Name	Year	Rank	Notes
Veronica carnosula Lam.	1791	species	= het.
Veronica caroliniana Walter	1788	species	= het.
Veronica chillensis Kunth	1818	species	= het.
Veronica laevis Lam.	1779	species	= het.
Veronica marilandica Murray	1782	species	= het., nom. illeg., homonym. post.
Veronica maximowicziana Vorosch.	1968	species	= het.
Veronica pallescens Gaterau	1789	species	= het.
Veronica peregrina subsp. asiatica Elenevsky	1975	subspecies	= het.
Veronica peregrina var. laurentiana Vict. & J.Rousseau	1940	variety	= het.
Veronica peregrina var. pubescens Honda	1940	variety	= het.
Veronica peregrina var. romana (L.) Dumort.	1827	variety	= het.
Veronica peregrina var. subserrata Rchb.	1823	variety	= het.
Veronica peregrina subsp. typica Pennell	1935	subspecies	≡ hom., not validly publ.
Veronica peregrina subsp. xalapensis (Kunth) Pennell	1935	subspecies	= het.
Veronica peregrina var. xalapensis (Kunth) H.St.John	1928	variety	= het.
Veronica peregrina f. xalapensis (Kunth) Kitag.	1979	form	= het.
Veronica peregrina xalapensis (Kunth) Pennell	1919		= het.
Veronica peruviana Willd. ex A.Dietr.	1831	species	= het.
Veronica romana L.	1753	species	= het.
Veronica sherwoodii Peck	1928	species	= het.
Veronica xalapensis Kunth	1818	species	= het.
Notes: ≡ homotypic synonym; = heterotypic synonym
