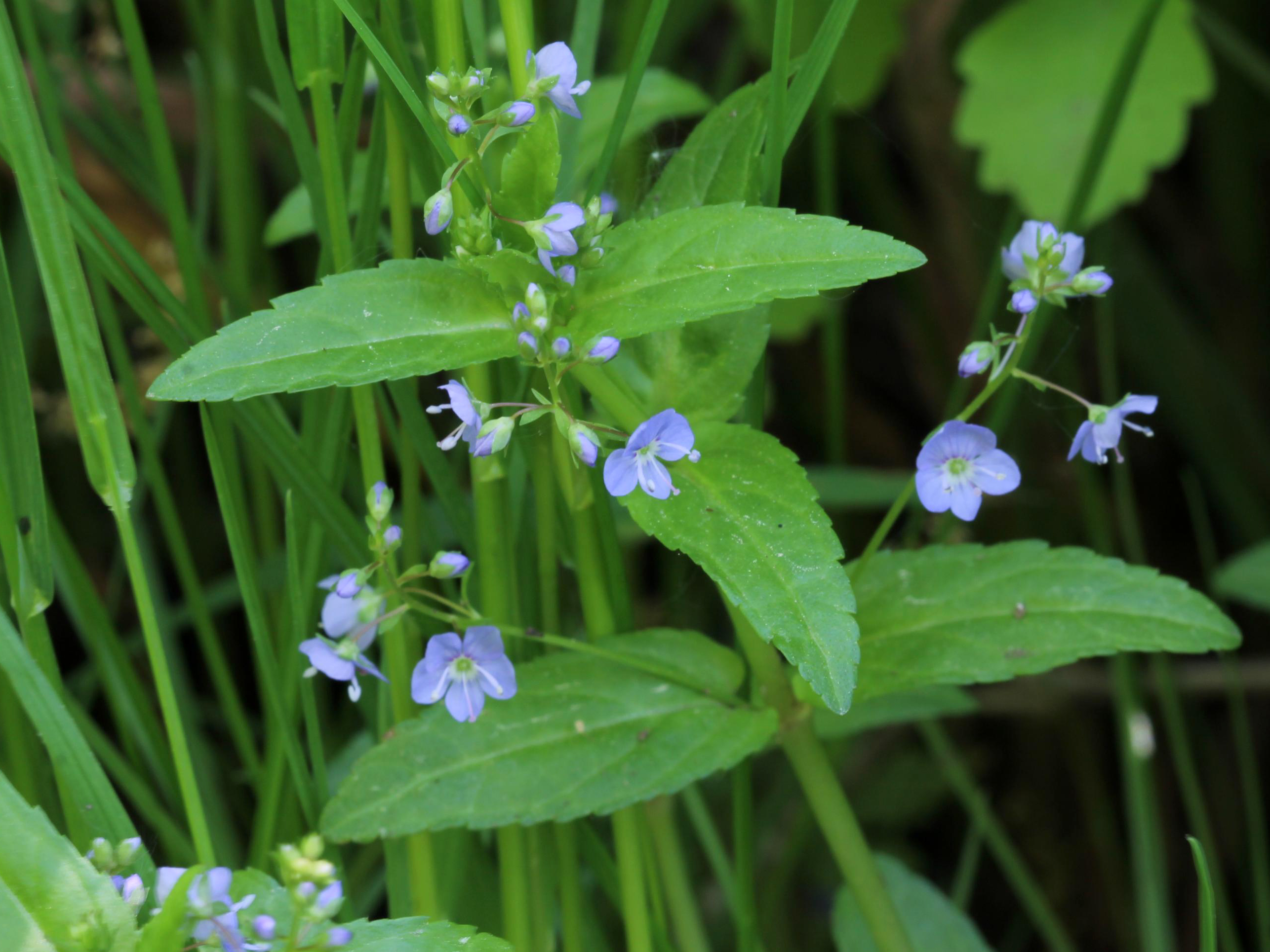

Conservation status
- Least Concern (IUCN 3.1)

- Secure (NatureServe)

Scientific classification
- Kingdom: Plantae
- Clade: Tracheophytes
- Clade: Angiosperms
- Clade: Eudicots
- Clade: Asterids
- Order: Lamiales
- Family: Plantaginaceae
- Genus: Veronica
- Species: V. americana

Binomial name
- Veronica americana (Raf.) Schwein. ex Benth.

Synonyms
- Veronica anagallis; Veronica crenatifolia; Veronica intermedia

= Veronica americana =

Plant species in the veronica family

Veronica americana, variously called American brooklime or American speedwell, is a flowering plant native to temperate and arctic Asia and North America where it grows in streams and bottomlands.

It is a herbaceous perennial with glabrous stems 10–100 cm (4–40 in) long that bear terminal or axillary racemes or spikes of soft violet flowers. The leaves are 1.5–8 cm (0.6–3.1 in) long and 3 to 20 times as long as wide, short-petiolate, glabrous, serrate to almost entire.

The plant can be confused with Scutellaria (skullcap) and other members of the mint family. Members of the mint family have square sided stems, and Veronica species have rounded stems.

== Taxonomy ==
In 1830 Constantine Samuel Rafinesque described a variety of Veronica beccabunga he named americana. The botanist George Bentham raised to species status in a publication published in 1846 where he credited Lewis David de Schweinitz, giving the taxa its accepted name. It is classified in the genus Veronica which is part of the Plantaginaceae family. It does not have any accepted varieties or forms, but there are three among its eight synonyms.

Table of Synonyms
Name	Year	Rank	Notes
Veronica americana f. albiflora Tatew. ex H.Hara	1948	form	= het.
Veronica americana var. crassula Rydb.	1900	variety	= het.
Veronica americana f. rosea J.K.Henry	1917	form	= het.
Veronica anagallis Bong.	1832	species	= het.
Veronica beccabunga var. americana Torr.	1843	variety	= het., nom. illeg.
Veronica beccabunga var. americana Raf.	1830	variety	≡ hom.
Veronica crenatifolia Greene	1903	species	= het.
Veronica intermedia Schwein.	1824	species	= het., nom. illeg.
Notes: ≡ homotypic synonym; = heterotypic synonym

== Uses ==
American speedwell is used both as food and as a medicinal plant. It is rich in nutrients and is reported to have a flavor similar to that of watercress. As long as the water source is not contaminated, the entire plant (sans roots) can be eaten raw.
