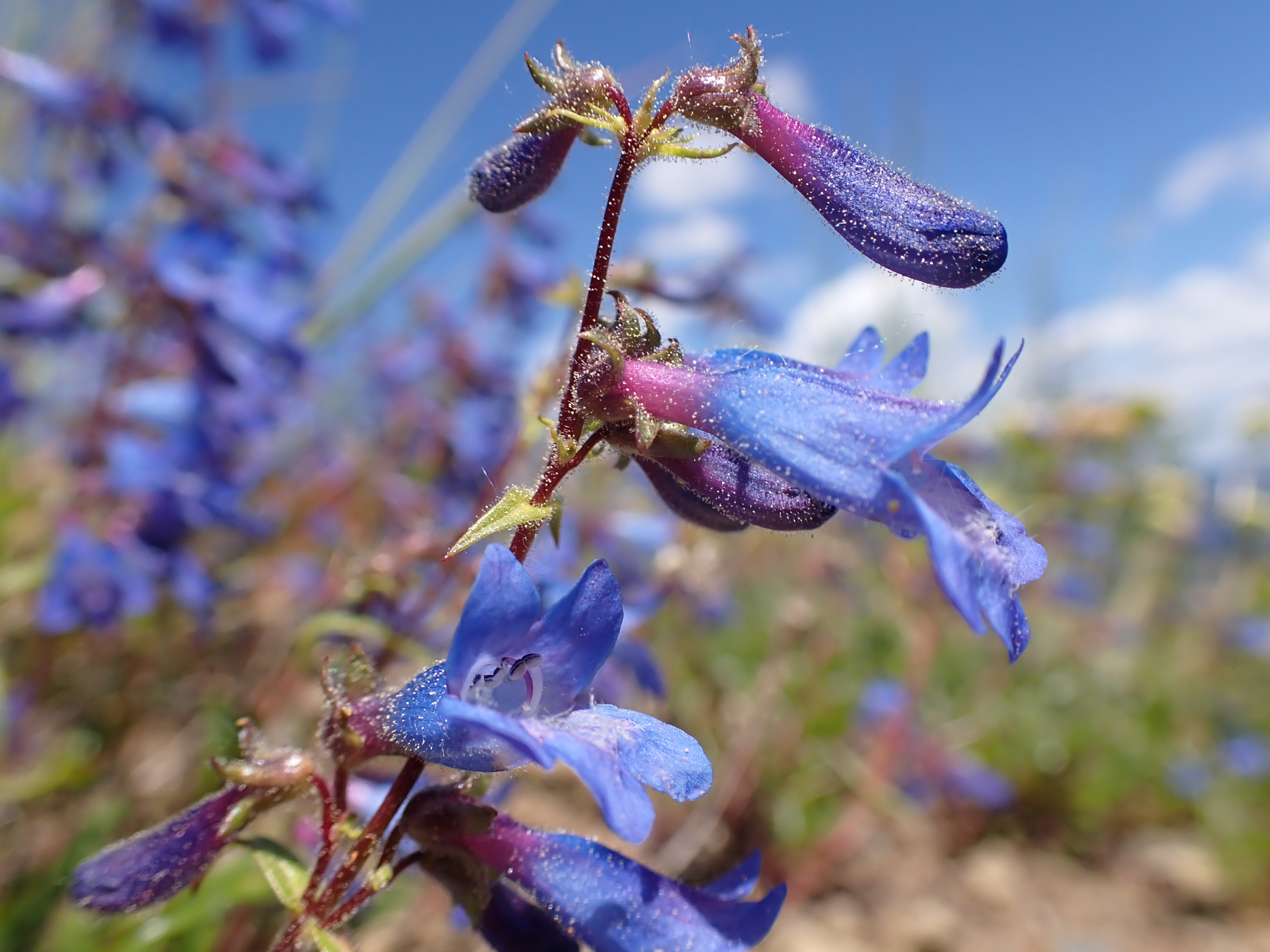

Scientific classification
- Kingdom: Plantae
- Clade: Embryophytes
- Clade: Tracheophytes
- Clade: Spermatophytes
- Clade: Angiosperms
- Clade: Eudicots
- Clade: Asterids
- Order: Lamiales
- Family: Plantaginaceae
- Genus: Penstemon
- Species: P. albertinus

Binomial name
- Penstemon albertinus Greene

= Penstemon albertinus =

Species of plant

Penstemon albertinus,the Alberta beardtongue, is a species of flowering plant in the family Plantaginaceae.

Its bilabiate flowers range from blue to purple with small hairs covering petals and stems. Flowers grow on reddish-green stems.

Penstemon albertinus can be found in Montana and Alberta. It is located in rocky slopes and forested areas.
