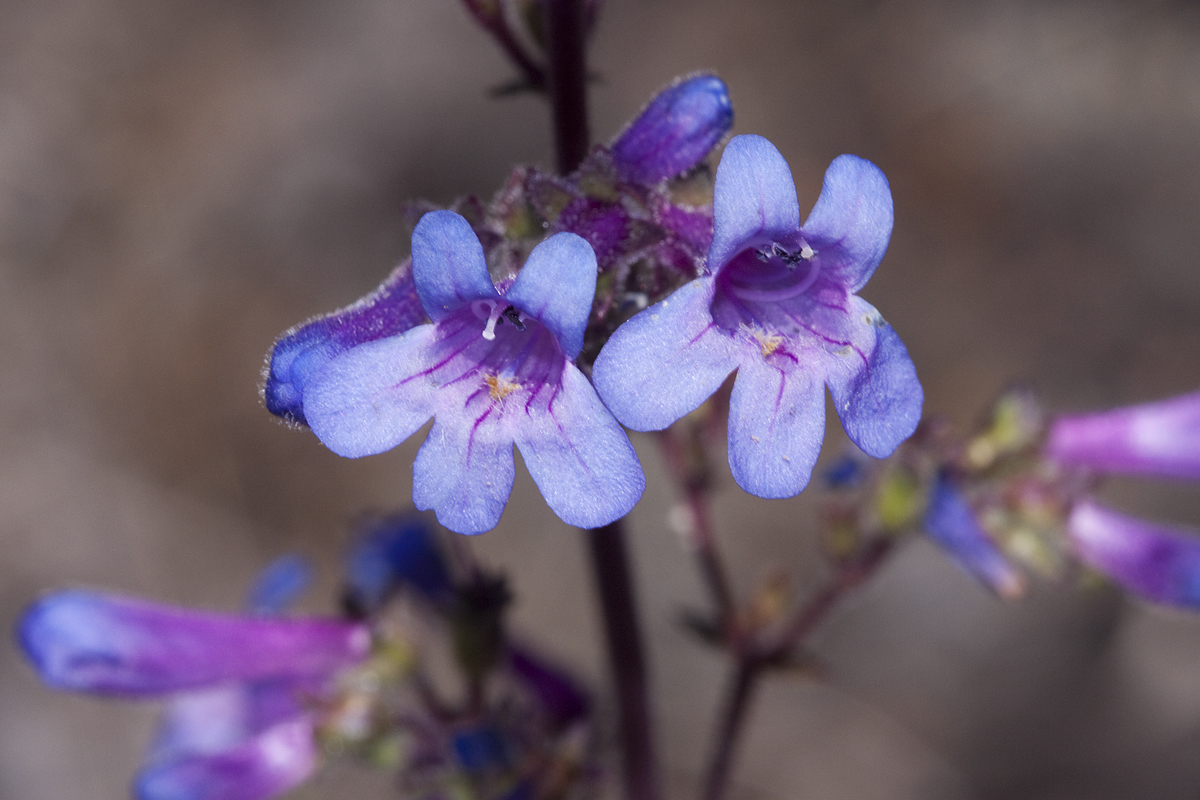

Conservation status
- Secure (NatureServe)

Scientific classification
- Kingdom: Plantae
- Clade: Tracheophytes
- Clade: Angiosperms
- Clade: Eudicots
- Clade: Asterids
- Order: Lamiales
- Family: Plantaginaceae
- Genus: Penstemon
- Species: P. humilis

Binomial name
- Penstemon humilis Nutt. ex A.Gray

Varieties
- P. h. var. brevifolius; P. h. var. humilis; P. h. var. obtusifolius

Synonyms
- Penstemon brevifolius; Penstemon cinereus; Penstemon collinus; Penstemon decurvus; Penstemon obtusifolius; Penstemon puberulus

= Penstemon humilis =

Plant species in the veronica family

Penstemon humilis is a species of flowering plant in the veronica family known by the common names low penstemon and lowly penstemon. It is native to the western United States.

This species of penstemon is found in sagebrush, in pinyon-juniper woodland habitat, and in mountain forests and tundra.

== Description ==
Low penstemon is a short species that usually grows a mat of basal leaves from a woody, branching caudex. Its flowering stems are variable and may grow along the ground or grow straight upwards, typically reaching lengths of 5 to 30 centimeters (2–12 in), but occasionally as short as 2 cm (0.8 in) or as long as 65 cm (26 in).

It has both stem and basal leaves, those attached directly to the caudex at the base of the plant. The leaves are not leathery, but can be either hairless or covered in backwards pointing hairs. The basal leaves and the lowest ones on the stems are usually 1.5 to 10.5 cm long and 2.2 to 3.2 cm wide, but can be occasionally just 8 millimeters long and just 2 mm wide. Each stems can have just one pair of leaves, but more often have two to four.

The flowers are narrowly tubular.

== Taxonomy ==
Penstemon humilis was scientifically described and named by Asa Gray in 1862, giving credit to Thomas Nuttall. It is part of the genus Penstemon which is classified in the Plantaginaceae family. It has three accepted varieties.

- Penstemon humilis var. brevifolius – Native to Utah
- Penstemon humilis var. humilis – Widespread from Washington to Colorado
- Penstemon humilis var. obtusifolius – Native to Utah

Penstemon humilis has twelve synonyms of the species or one of its three varieties.

Table of Synonyms
Name	Year	Rank	Synonym of:	Notes
Penstemon brevifolius (A.Gray) A.Nelson	1909	species	var. brevifolius	≡ hom.
Penstemon cinereus Piper	1913	species	var. humilis	= het.
Penstemon cinereus subsp. foliatus D.D.Keck	1945	subspecies	var. humilis	= het.
Penstemon cinereus subsp. typicus D.D.Keck	1945	subspecies	var. humilis	= het., not validly publ.
Penstemon collinus A.Nelson	1898	species	var. humilis	= het.
Penstemon decurvus Pennell ex Crosswh.	1965	species	var. humilis	= het.
Penstemon humilis subsp. brevifolius (A.Gray) D.D.Keck	1945	subspecies	var. brevifolius	≡ hom.
Penstemon humilis var. desereticus S.L.Welsh	1993	variety	var. humilis	= het.
Penstemon humilis subsp. obtusifolius (Pennell) D.D.Keck	1945	subspecies	var. obtusifolius	≡ hom.
Penstemon humilis subsp. typicus D.D.Keck	1945	subspecies	P. humilis	≡ hom., not validly publ.
Penstemon obtusifolius Pennell	1920	species	var. obtusifolius	≡ hom.
Penstemon puberulus M.E.Jones	1908	species	var. humilis	= het., nom. illeg., homonym. post.
Notes: ≡ homotypic synonym; = heterotypic synonym

=== Names ===
The species name, humilis, means 'low-growing' in Botanical Latin. Similarly it is known by the common names low penstemon, lowly penstemon, or low beardtongue.

== See also ==
- List of Penstemon species
