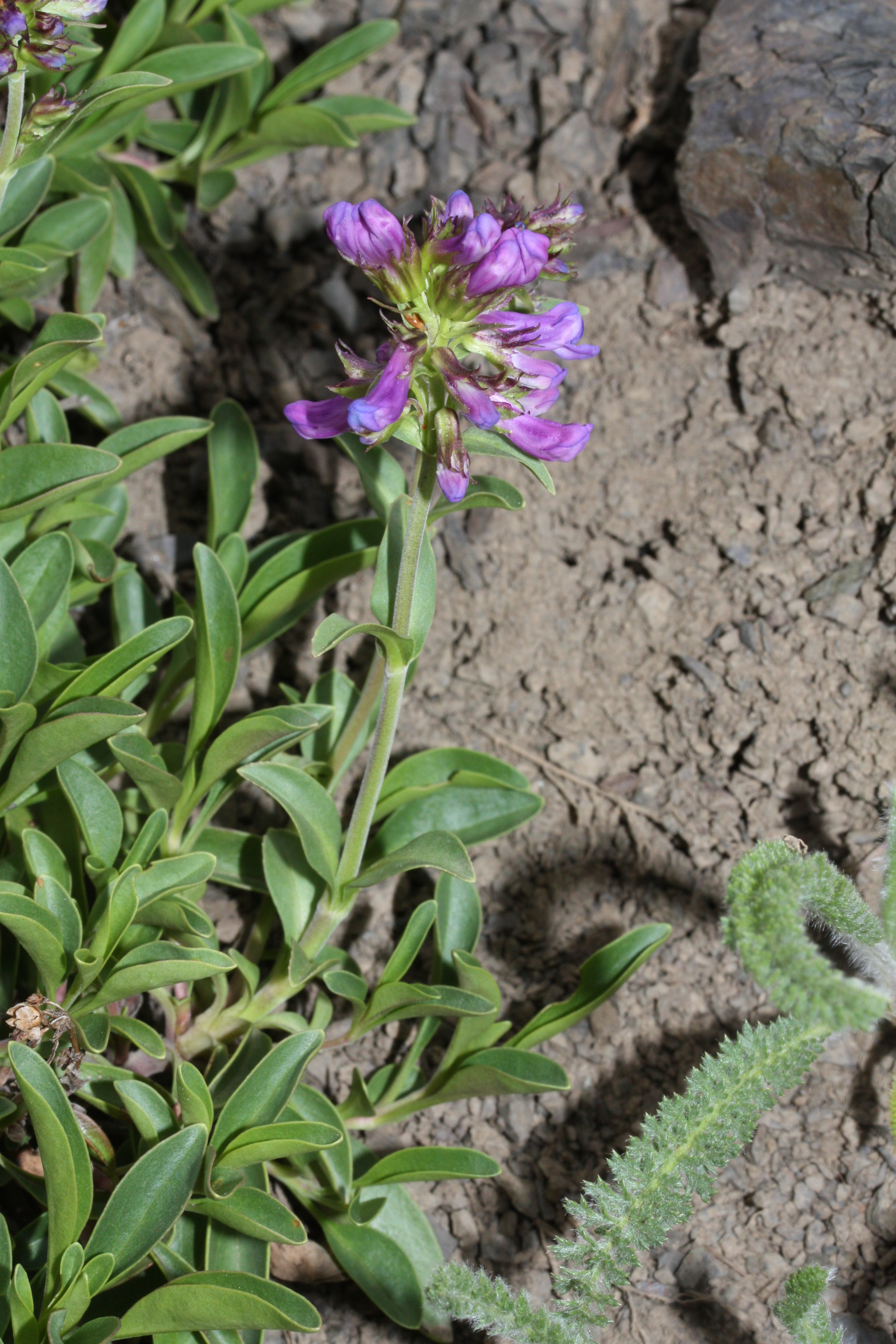

Conservation status
- Secure (NatureServe)

Scientific classification
- Kingdom: Plantae
- Clade: Embryophytes
- Clade: Tracheophytes
- Clade: Spermatophytes
- Clade: Angiosperms
- Clade: Eudicots
- Clade: Asterids
- Order: Lamiales
- Family: Plantaginaceae
- Genus: Penstemon
- Species: P. procerus

Binomial name
- Penstemon procerus Douglas ex Graham

Varieties
- P. p. var. aberrans Penstemon procerus var. brachyanthus; Penstemon procerus var. formosus; Penstemon procerus var. modestus; Penstemon procerus var. procerus; Penstemon procerus var. tolmiei

= Penstemon procerus =

Plant species in the veronica family

Penstemon procerus is a species of penstemon known by the common name littleflower penstemon. It is native to western North America from Alaska to California to Colorado, as far east in Canada as Manitoba, where it grows in mountain habitat such as meadows, often in alpine climates. This herbaceous perennial forms mats of herbage with some erect stems reaching about 40 centimeters in maximum height. There are several varieties which vary in morphology, some more decumbent than others, some of which are known commonly as pincushion penstemons for their matted forms. In general, the leaves are lance-shaped to oval, plentiful around the base of the plant with smaller ones arranged in opposite pairs along the stem. The inflorescence is made up of one or more clusters of tubular flowers with lipped, lobed mouths. Each flower is no more than one centimeter in length and is purple to blue in color, often with a white throat. The outside of the flower is generally hairless, while the inside may be lined with white or yellowish hairs.

== Description ==
Littleflower penstemons have a wide range of heights when mature, typically 3 to 40 centimeters (1–16 in), but occasionally as tall as 70 cm (28 in). Its stems can be hairless or be more or less covered in backwards pointing stiff hairs, but are never glaucous. The flowering stems can either grow straight upwards or lean outwards from the base of the plant before growing upwards, occasionally they may grow along the ground. The non-flowering stems are often numerous enough for form a mat at the base of the plant.

Plants can have both basal leaves, springing directly from the base of the plant, and leaves attached to the stems, but in some plants the basal leaves are not well developed. They might have a somewhat leathery texture and can have rough backwards pointing hairs, be simply hairy, or hairless. Basal leaves and the ones lowest on the stems range from 0.9 to 9 cm long, only occasionally reaching 11.5 cm.

== Taxonomy ==
Penstemon procerus was given its scientific name in 1829 by Robert Graham, crediting the work of David Douglas. It is part of the genus Penstemon which is classified in the family Plantaginaceae. It has six accepted varieties.

- Penstemon procerus var. aberrans
  Native to Utah.
- Penstemon procerus var. brachyanthus
  Native to Oregon and northwestern California.
- Penstemon procerus var. formosus
  Native to Oregon, California, and western Nevada.
- Penstemon procerus var. modestus
  Native to Nevada.
- Penstemon procerus var. procerus
  Widespread from Alaska to Colorado.
- Penstemon procerus var. tolmiei
  Native to eastern central British Columbia and eastern Washington.

Penstemon procerus has 29 synonyms of the species or one of its subspecies.

Table of Synonyms
| Name | Year | Rank | Synonym of: | Notes |
|---|---|---|---|---|
| Lepteiris parviflora Raf. | 1837 | species | var. procerus | = het. |
| Penstemon brachyanthus Pennell | 1941 | species | var. brachyanthus | ≡ hom. |
| Penstemon cacuminis Pennell | 1941 | species | var. formosus | ≡ hom. |
| Penstemon confertus var. aberrans M.E.Jones | 1895 | variety | var. aberrans | ≡ hom. |
| Penstemon confertus var. modestus (Greene) Jeps. | 1925 | variety | var. modestus | ≡ hom. |
| Penstemon confertus var. procerus (Douglas ex Graham) Coville | 1893 | variety | P. procerus | ≡ hom. |
| Penstemon formosus A.Nelson | 1904 | species | var. formosus | ≡ hom., nom. illeg. |
| Penstemon micranthus Nutt. | 1834 | species | var. procerus | = het. |
| Penstemon modestus Greene | 1906 | species | var. modestus | ≡ hom. |
| Penstemon pononii T.Moore & Mast. | 1872 | species | var. procerus | = het. |
| Penstemon procerus subsp. aberrans (M.E.Jones) D.D.Keck | 1945 | subspecies | var. aberrans | ≡ hom. |
| Penstemon procerus f. albescens B.Boivin | 1966 | form | var. procerus | = het. |
| Penstemon procerus subsp. brachyanthus (Pennell) D.D.Keck | 1957 | subspecies | var. brachyanthus | ≡ hom. |
| Penstemon procerus var. fimbriatus Regel | 1872 | variety | var. procerus | = het. |
| Penstemon procerus subsp. formosus (D.D.Keck) D.D.Keck | 1957 | subspecies | var. formosus | ≡ hom. |
| Penstemon procerus f. jenkinsii B.Boivin | 1960 | form | var. procerus | = het. |
| Penstemon procerus var. micrantus (Nutt.) M.E.Jones | 1910 | variety | var. procerus | = het. |
| Penstemon procerus subsp. modestus (Greene) D.D.Keck | 1957 | subspecies | var. modestus | ≡ hom. |
| Penstemon procerus subsp. pulvereus Pennell | 1920 | subspecies | var. procerus | = het. |
| Penstemon procerus subsp. tolmiei (Hook.) D.D.Keck | 1957 | subspecies | var. tolmiei | ≡ hom. |
| Penstemon procerus subsp. typicus D.D.Keck | 1945 | subspecies | P. procerus | ≡ hom., not validly publ. |
| Penstemon pulchellus Greene | 1898 | species | var. formosus | ≡ hom., nom. illeg. |
| Penstemon spicatus T.Moore & Mast. | 1872 | species | var. procerus | = het. |
| Penstemon tinctus Pennell | 1941 | species | var. procerus | = het. |
| Penstemon tolmiei Hook. | 1838 | species | var. tolmiei | ≡ hom. |
| Penstemon tolmiei subsp. brachyanthus (Pennell) D.D.Keck | 1945 | subspecies | var. brachyanthus | ≡ hom. |
| Penstemon tolmiei subsp. formosus D.D.Keck | 1945 | subspecies | var. formosus | ≡ hom. |
| Penstemon tolmiei subsp. modestus (Greene) D.D.Keck | 1945 | subspecies | var. modestus | ≡ hom. |
| Penstemon tolmiei subsp. typicus D.D.Keck | 1945 | subspecies | var. tolmiei | ≡ hom., not validly publ. |
Notes: ≡ homotypic synonym; = heterotypic synonym

== Names ==
The specific epithet, procerus, is Botanical Latin meaning "tall", however the alpine forms of the species are quite short. It is frequently called by the common names littleflower penstemon or little flower penstemon. It is similarly known as the small-flowered penstemon, small-flowered beardtongue, and little blue penstemon. It is also known as tall penstemon, pincushion penstemon, and slender blue penstemon.

== Cultivation ==
In cultivation in the UK the cultivar 'Roy Davidson' has won the Royal Horticultural Society's Award of Garden Merit. It copes with a range of situations, but requires a well-drained medium in full or partial sun.
