= Aven Nelson =

U.S. botanist and a founding professor of the University of Wyoming (1859–1952)

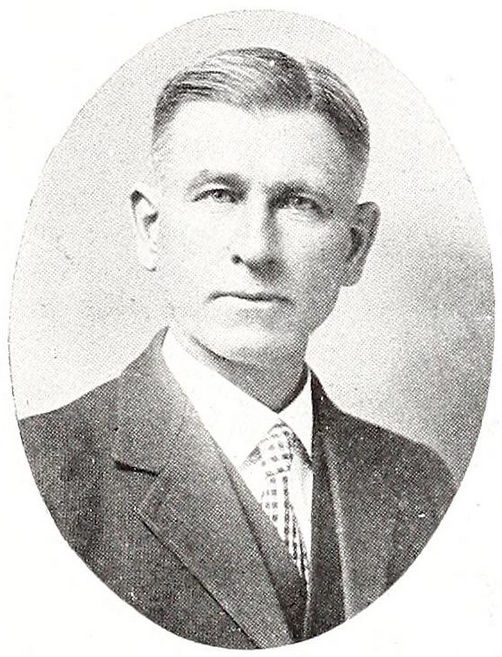
- Nelson circa 1909
- Born: 24 March 1859; Lee County, Iowa
- Died: 31 March 1952 (aged 93); Colorado Springs, Colorado
- Education: University of Denver
- Known for: President, University of Wyoming
- Spouse(s): Celia Alice Calhoun (1860-1929); Ruth E. Ashton (1896-1987)
- Scientific career
- Fields: Botany
- Workplaces: University of Wyoming
- Author abbrev. (botany): A.Nelson, A.Nels.

Aven Nelson (March 24, 1859 – March 31, 1952) was an American botanist who specialized in plants of the Rocky Mountains. He was one of the founding professors of the University of Wyoming, where he taught for 55 years as professor and served as president (1918-1922). He served as president of the American Society of Plant Taxonomists and Botanical Society of America.

== Biography ==
Nelson was born at Sugar Creek, in Lee County, Iowa to parents Christen Nelson and Anne Nelson, who had immigrated from Norway. His father was born Christen Nielssen Espevig, the second last name identifying a place near Stavanger in Norway and the first due to being the son of Niels. His name was changed on his American citizenship papers. Christen immigrated to America in 1843 and was joined by Anna Evenson Soppeland, his prospective wife in 1848. They married upon her arrival in Chicago and then set out for Christen's eighty acre farm.

Aven was the youngest of four children in a Quaker family. He attended Kirksville State Normal School in Kirksville, Missouri from which he was graduated in 1883 with his Bachelor of Arts degree, while in 1887 he received the M. S. D. degree. He further continued his education in Drury College at Springfield, Missouri, which conferred upon him a Master of Science degree in 1890. He next entered Harvard University was awarded the Master of Arts degree in 1892. In 1893, he co-founded the Rocky Mountain Herbarium. At that time he started to curate and edit large duplicate series of herbarium specimens with printed labels and fixed titles, among others Plants of Wyoming. From the Rocky Mountain Herbarium and Plants of Yellowstone National Park. From the Rocky Mountain Herbarium. These large and widely distributed collections are sometimes confused with exsiccata works.

He came to the University of Wyoming in 1887. In 1901, he was made fellow of the American Association for the Advancement of Science. In 1904, the University of Denver conferred upon him the degree of Doctor of Philosophy. In 1917, Nelson was named acting president, then president (1918) of the University of Wyoming, a position he held until 1922. In 1934, he was elected president of the Botanical Society of America. In 1927, he co-founded the Colorado-Wyoming Academy of Science. In 1935, he became president of the American Society of Plant Taxonomists.

== Personal life ==
Nelson met Celia Alice Calhoun (1860-1929) soon after she arrived in Kirksville to attend college in the Fall of 1880. They married at the home of her parents near Kilwinning, Missouri on 1 September 1885. They were the parents of two children. In 1931, he married fellow botanist Ruth Elizabeth Ashton (1896-1987) in Santa Fe, New Mexico. He died in Colorado Springs, Colorado in 1952. The Aven Nelson Memorial Building on the campus of the University of Wyoming is named in his honor.

== Selected works ==
- First report on the flora of Wyoming (1896)
- The Trees of Wyoming and How to Know Them (1899)
- The Red Desert of Wyoming and its forage resources (1898) Library of Congress Catalog #. LCCN agr09000261.
- The Flora of Montana (1900)
- The Cryptogams of Wyoming. A Preliminary Report upon those Species (1900) ASIN B00088QIUU
- The Brome-Grasses of Wyoming (1901)
- An Analytical Key to Some of the Common Flowering Plants of the Rocky Mountain Region (1902)
- Shade tree suggestions (1903)
- Spring Flora of the Intermountain States (1912) OL 14173707M LCCN 12-14157

== Other sources ==
- Knobloch, Frieda E. (2005) Botanical Companions: a Memoir of Plants and Place (University of Iowa Press) ISBN 9781587294525
