= Creeping penstemon =

List of plants with the same or similar names

Creeping penstemon is a common name of three species of plant:

- Penstemon davidsonii, also the Davidson penstemon, native to mountains in British Columbia to California
- Penstemon linarioides, also the toadflax penstemon, native to the intermountain west of the United States
- Penstemon teucrioides, also the grayleaf creeping penstemon, native to just the state of Colorado
