= USC&GS Davidson =

USC&GS Davidson was the name of two ships of the United States Coast and Geodetic Survey, and may refer to:

- USC&GS Davidson (1925), a launch in service from 1933 to 1935
- USC&GS Davidson (CSS 31), a coastal survey ship in service with the Coast and Geodetic Survey from 1967 to 1970 and, as the survey ship NOAAS Davidson (S 331), with the National Oceanic and Atmospheric Administration from 1970 to 1989
