= Penstemon xylus =

- Fishlake National Forest, Piute County, Utah

Conservation status
- Imperiled (NatureServe)

Scientific classification
- Kingdom: Plantae
- Clade: Tracheophytes
- Clade: Angiosperms
- Clade: Eudicots
- Clade: Asterids
- Order: Lamiales
- Family: Plantaginaceae
- Genus: Penstemon
- Species: P. xylus

Binomial name
- Penstemon xylus A.Nelson

Synonyms
- Penstemon tusharensis

Plant species in the veronica family

Penstemon xylus, commonly the Tushar bluemat penstemon and Tushar penstemon, is a species from the mountains of southern Utah in the western United States. It is part of the veronica family and has blue to violet flowers.

== Description ==
Tushar bluemat penstemons are small, leafy subshrubs, plants with older stems that are somewhat woody and persistent. The flowering stems can grow along the ground, spread outwards, or grow straight upwards to lengths of 6 to 12 centimeters (2.5–4.5 in) and sprout from the older, branching woody stems. They are covered in backwards pointing hairs that may lay down on the surface of the stem and/or be scale like.

The leaves are quite small, ranging in length from 6–16 millimeters and 2–4.5 mm wide. Each flowering stem will have one to five pairs attached to opposite sides of the stem with obovate to spatulate shape.

The small upwards facing blue to blue-violet flowers open in June, July, or August in their native habitat.

== Taxonomy ==
The botanist Asa Gray published the first scientific description of what is accepted as Penstemon xylus in 1878, but as a variety of Penstemon caespitosus which he named suffruticosus. When other scientists proposed changing its classification to a species the prior publication of Penstemon suffruticosus Douglas ex Benth. blocked the use of the variety name. A substitute name of Penstemon suffrutescens was published by Per Axel Rydberg in 1901, but used a different specimen that seems to be Penstemon crandallii, gave too brief a description, and wrongly marked it as a new species, rather than a new name. The botanist Aven Nelson published the first accepted scientific description of Penstemon xylus in 1902 as a new name replacing P. caespitosus var. suffruticosus. In 1979 Noel Herman Holmgren published Penstemon tusharensis as a new name for the species because he believed that Nelson's use of yet another mistaken P. crandallii specimen invalidated his publication, but the penstemon expert Craig C. Freeman published an argument in 2017 that the name Penstemon xylus was a good substitute and should stand. The species name is accepted in Plants of the World Online, World Plants, and by NatureServe, however in A Utah Flora the authors follow the original description as a variety of P. caespitosus.

In all Penstemon xylus has three homotypic synonyms.

Table of Synonyms
Name	Year	Rank	Notes
Penstemon caespitosus subsp. suffruticosus (A.Gray) D.D.Keck	1937	subspecies	
Penstemon caespitosus var. suffruticosus A.Gray	1878	variety	
Penstemon tusharensis N.H.Holmgren	1979	species	nom. illeg., superfluous

=== Names ===
The species is known by the common names Tushar bluemat penstemon, Tushar Range penstemon, Tushar penstemon, and Tushar Range beardtongue.

== Range and habitat ==
The Tushar bluemat penstemon is endemic to south-central Utah mostly in the Tushar Mountains and Fishlake National Forest, but with some documentation on the Markagunt Plateau. It is reliably recorded from Iron, Garfield, Beaver, Piute, and Sevier counties.

There it grows at higher elevations from 2,100 to 3,100 meters (6,900–10,200 ft) in sagebrush shrublands, aspen woodlands, and pine woodlands.
