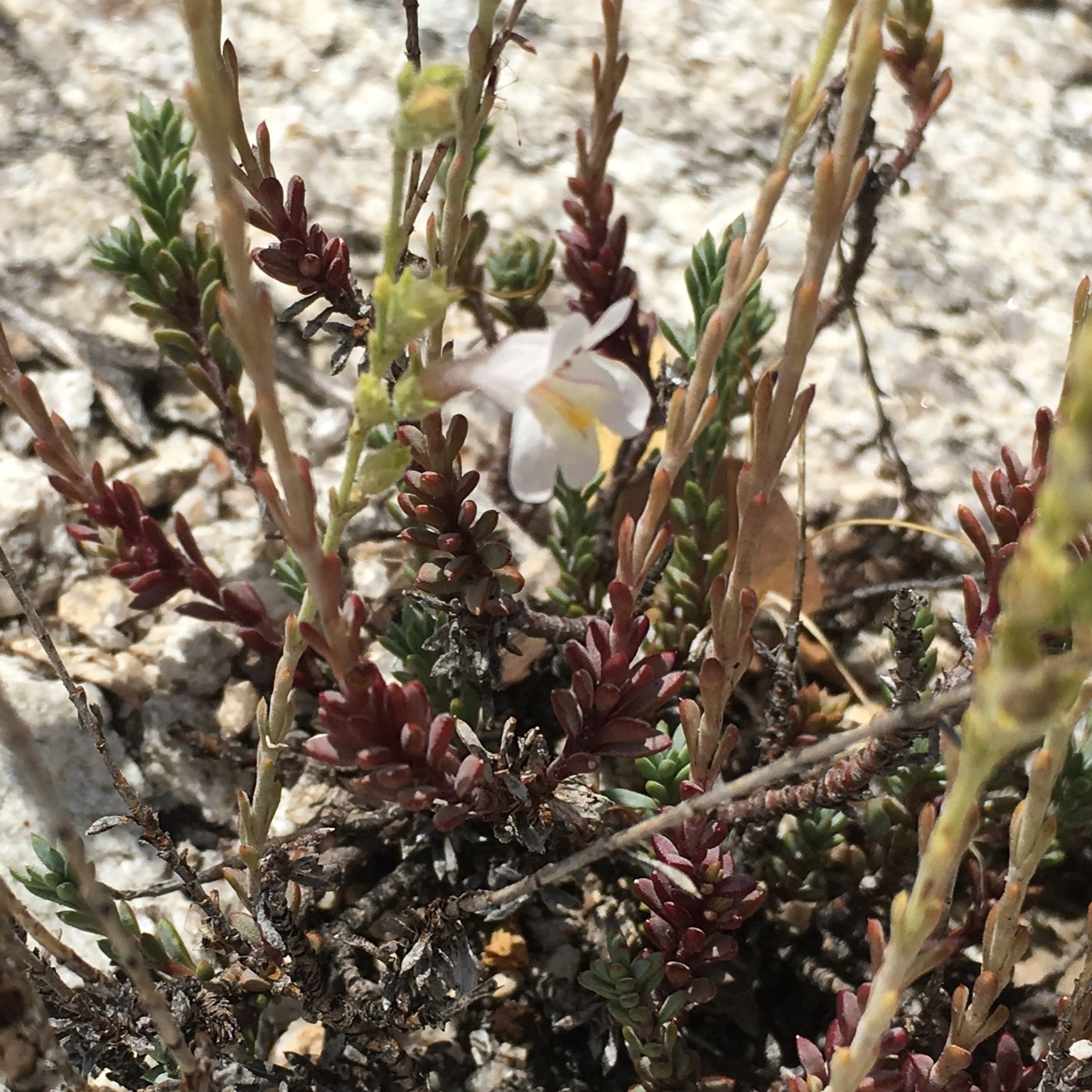
- Santa Catalina Mountains, Coronado National Forest

Conservation status
- Imperiled (NatureServe)

Scientific classification
- Kingdom: Plantae
- Clade: Tracheophytes
- Clade: Angiosperms
- Clade: Eudicots
- Clade: Asterids
- Order: Lamiales
- Family: Plantaginaceae
- Genus: Penstemon
- Species: P. discolor

Binomial name
- Penstemon discolor D.D.Keck

= Penstemon discolor =

Plant species in the veronica family

Penstemon discolor is a rare plant native to just the mountains of southeastern Arizona.

== Description ==
Penstemon discolor is a short, tuft forming subshrub with one to more than twenty branching stems. The stems are unobtrusive, resembling a clump of twigs until more closely observed. They grow 10 to 35 centimeters (3.9–13.8 in) long and grow either straight upwards or outward and then upwards. The stems are thinly to thickly covered in backwards pointing hairs with the hairs towards the ends of the stems often scale-like and white.

The leaves are thick and leathery with a length of 5–23 millimeters and a width of just 1–1.5 mm. They are narrow and grass-like to narrowly oblanceolate, like a thin reversed spearhead. Each main stem will have 10 to 30 leaf pairs attached to opposite sides by short leaf stems. The upper surface of the leaves are covered in a dense layer of scale-like hairs white the lower sides are hairless or rarely covered in backwards pointing scales. The species is very similar to toadflax penstemon (Penstemon linarioides), but toadflax penstemons have leaves that are covered on both sides by hairs that obscure less than half the surface, only rarely being hairless, and a cross section that is flat to U-shaped. Penstemon discolor has leaves that are densely covered on the upper-side only and only shallowly U-shaped. The hairs are dense enough to give the leaves a silvery cast.

The flowers are mostly almost white to pale pink in color, but can also be lavender to violet or purple. The petals are fused into a wide funnel shape with five lobes, both the two upper and three lower ones projecting forwards and spreading out. The lower lobes and interior of the tube have faint to dark reddish-purple floral guide lines. Overall the corolla is 9–14 mm long with a diameter of 3.5–5 mm. The exterior of the flower is covered in pointed, glandular hairs white the lower surface inside the flower has white to yellow woolly hairs. The staminode is covered in 1 mm long golden-yellow hairs, is 7–8 mm long and can just reach the flower's mouth or be fully contained inside the tube. Flowering can occur from June to September in its native habitat.

The fruit is a capsule 5‒8 mm long and 3‒4 mm wide containing numerous black seeds 1.2‒1.6 mm long. The seeds can be sharply angled to rounded.

== Taxonomy ==
Penstemon discolor was scientifically described and named by David D. Keck 1937. It is classified in the genus Penstemon as part of the Plantaginaceae family. It has no subspecies or synonyms.

=== Names ===
The species name, discolor, means 'of a different color' or 'variegated' in Botanical Latin, a reference to the different upper and lower sides of its leaves. It is known in English as the Catalina beardtongue.

== Range and habitat ==
Penstemon discolor is endemic to just southeastern Arizona. According to the Natural Resources Conservation Service it grows in Pinal, Graham, Pima, Santa Cruz, and Cochise counties. It is definitionally found in the Santa Teresa, Dragoon, Santa Catalina, Galiuro, and Winchester mountains and might also be present in the Atascosa Mountains in southern Arizona. It grows at elevations of 1,500 to 2,300 meters (4,900–7,500 ft). The total extent of its range is about 1,000 to 5,000 square kilometers (390–1,930 sq mi).

It is often found in crevices in granite rocks and grows in pinyon–juniper woodlands and oak woodlands.

=== Conservation ===
The conservation organization NatureServe rated the species as imperiled (G2, S2) when they evaluated it in 2015. The species was previously a candidate for protection under the US Endangered Species Act, but was removed from consideration in 1996. The species is threatened by hikers, live stock grazing, highway and road widening, and invasive species. The species is mostly found on federally owned lands and hiking and rock climbing activities could be routed away from known populations to protect the species.

== Uses ==
Though its flowers are small, Penstemon discolor is cultivated, especially in rock gardens and by penstemon enthusiasts. It is also one of just 24 species in the penstemon genus with white or nearly white flowers. The seeds require 12-weeks of cold-moist stratification for good germination.

== See also ==
List of Penstemon species
