= Thomas Davidson =

Thomas Davidson may refer to:

- Thomas Davidson (printer) (fl. early 16th century), Scottish printer in the reign of James V
- Thomas Davidson (palaeontologist) (1817–1885), Scottish palaeontologist
- Thomas Davidson (poet) (1838–1870), Anglo-Scottish poet
- Thomas Davidson (philosopher) (1840–1900), Scottish philosopher
- Thomas Davidson (painter) (1842–1919), English painter
- Thomas G. Davidson (1805–1883), U.S. Representative from Louisiana
- Thomas Scott Davidson (1858–1933), Canadian auctioneer and politician
- Thomas Davidson (naval architect) (1828–1874), naval constructor in the United States Navy
- Thomas Randall Davidson (1747–1827), Church of Scotland minister and landowner
- Thomas Whitfield Davidson (1876–1974), U.S. federal judge
- Tommy Davidson (born 1963), American actor
- Tommy Davidson (footballer) (1873–1949), Scottish footballer
- Rex Davidson (Thomas Rex Davidson, 1927–2017), Australian cricketer
- Thomas Davidson (South African cricketer) (1906–1987), South African cricketer
