= Penstemon abietinus =

- Hobble Creek Canyon, Utah

Conservation status
- Imperiled (NatureServe)

Scientific classification
- Kingdom: Plantae
- Clade: Tracheophytes
- Clade: Angiosperms
- Clade: Eudicots
- Clade: Asterids
- Order: Lamiales
- Family: Plantaginaceae
- Genus: Penstemon
- Species: P. abietinus

Binomial name
- Penstemon abietinus Pennell

Plant species in the veronica family

Penstemon abietinus, the firleaf penstemon, is a species in the veronica family that only grows in the state of Utah.

== Description ==
Firleaf penstemons are subshrubs, plants that resemble shrubs in having stems that become more woody with age and branch frequently. They will typically reach 5 to 15 centimeters (2–6 in), but occasionally can be as much as 23 cm (9 in) long. Older stems also tend to lay down on the ground or only turn up at the ends and will root at the nodes. The stems are quite covered in leaves and puberulent, covered in very short, thin hairs.

The flowers are have a funnel shaped purple tube, but have a lavender-blue throat.

== Taxonomy ==
Penstemon abietinus was scientifically described and named by Francis W. Pennell in 1920. It is classified in the Penstemon genus within the Plantaginaceae family. The species has no botanical synonyms or subspecies. It is listed as an accepted species in Plants of the World Online, World Plants, and the Flora of North America, but it was suggested by the authors of A Utah Flora that it might be better to treat it as a variety of Penstemon linarioides without actually publishing a new combination.

=== Names ===
The scientific name, abietinus, means "fir leaf" in Botanical Latin. It is similarly known as firleaf penstemon and firleaf beardtongue.

== Range and habitat ==
The firleaf penstemon is endemic to the state of Utah in the western United States. It is known to grow in Utah, Sevier, and San Juan counties. There are also historical records for the species in Wasatch, Sanpete, Emery, and Iron counties, but may or may not grow there as of 2025.

== See also ==
- List of Penstemon species
