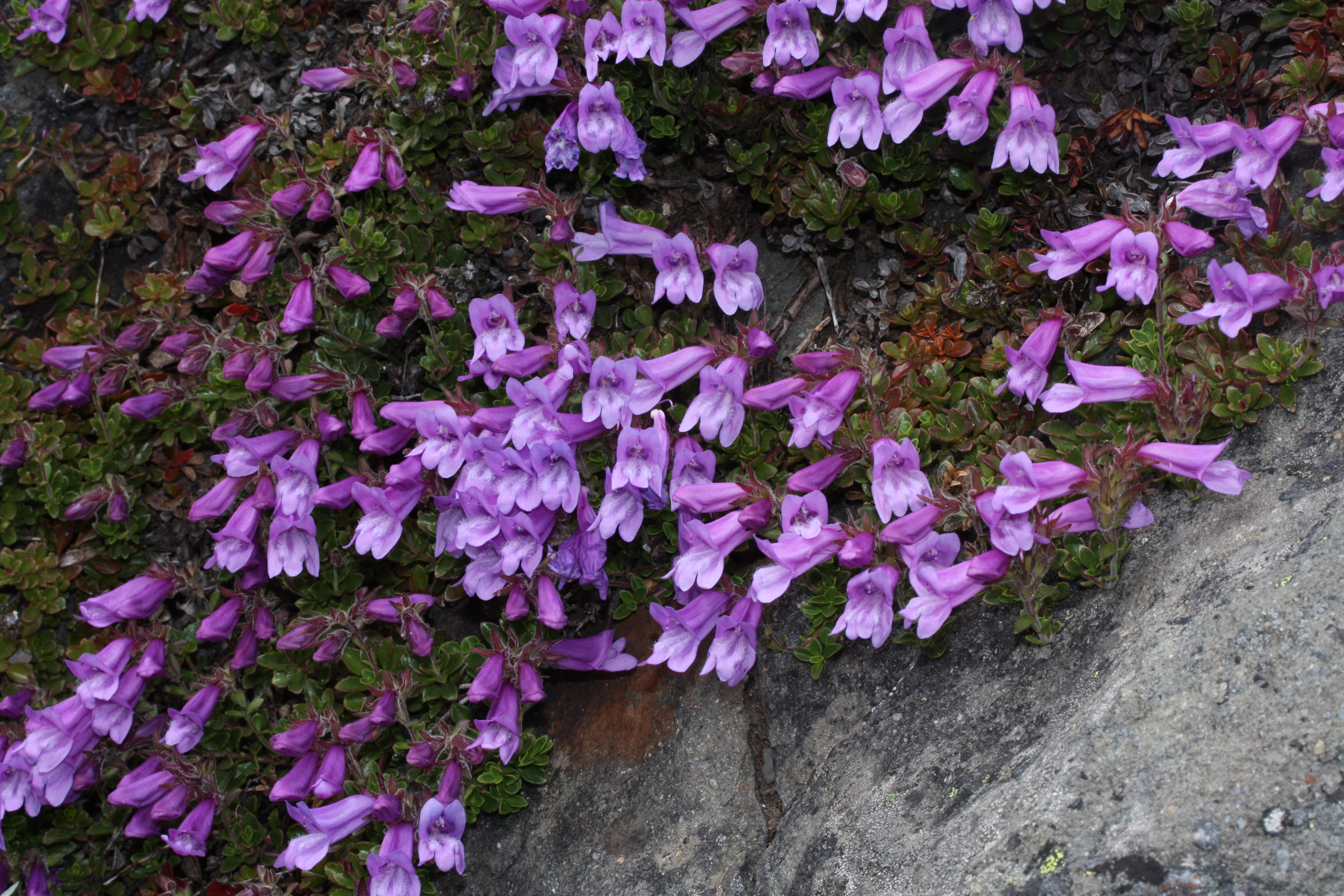
- P. davidsonii var. menziesii, Olympic National Park, Washington

Conservation status
- Apparently Secure (NatureServe)

Scientific classification
- Kingdom: Plantae
- Clade: Tracheophytes
- Clade: Angiosperms
- Clade: Eudicots
- Clade: Asterids
- Order: Lamiales
- Family: Plantaginaceae
- Genus: Penstemon
- Species: P. davidsonii

Binomial name
- Penstemon davidsonii Greene

Varieties
- P. davidsonii var. davidsonii; P. davidsonii var. menziesii (D.D.Keck) Cronquist; P. davidsonii var. praeteritus Cronquist

Synonyms
- List: Penstemon menziesii subsp. davidsonii (Greene) Piper; Penstemon menziesii f. davidsonii (Greene) G.N.Jones

= Penstemon davidsonii =

Plant species in the plantain family

Penstemon davidsonii is a species of penstemon known by the common name Davidson's penstemon, honoring Dr. George Davidson. It is native to western North America.

== Description ==
Penstemon davidsonii is a low, mat-forming subshrub up to that can be 4 to 17 centimeters (1 1/2 to 6 3/4 in) tall, but is usually no more than 10 cm (4 in) tall. Its stems are covered in fine, short hairs or in stiff backwards facing ones.

The leaves are evergreen and small. Each stem with have five to ten pairs pairs of leaves ranging in length from 0.5 to 3 centimeters, but usually between 1 and 2 cm. Their surface is hairless or faintly covered in fine hairs, but is never glaucous or waxy. The edges of the leaves may be smooth or toothed. The leaves often have a paler green, tan, or reddish edge. The flowers are tubular, blue-lavender to purple, and large relative to the short stature of the plant. The calyx is covered with short hair. Larger plants often flower abundantly, with the leaf mat nearly covered with the showy flowers.

== Taxonomy ==
The scientific description and name of Penstemon davidsonii of was published in 1892 by Edward Lee Greene. However, the first description of any part of the species was of Penstemon douglasii described by William Jackson Hooker in 1838, which is considered a heterotypic synonym of Penstemon davidsonii var. menziesii.

=== Varieties ===
Penstemon davidsonii has three accepted varieties.

==== Penstemon davidsonii var. davidsonii ====
The autonymic variety is the most widespread, growing from British Columbia to California. It grows on rock outcrops and talus slopes, the piles of rocks at the base of cliffs at elevations from 900 meters (3,000 ft) to as high as 3,700 meters (12,100 ft).

==== Penstemon davidsonii var. menziesii ====
The variety menziesii was described by David D. Keck as a subspecies in 1957 and then as a variety by Arthur J. Cronquist in 1959. Like var davidsonii it grows on rocky outcrops, slopes, and ledges, but at much lower elevations. From 30 meters (98 ft) to 2,000 meters (6,600 ft). It grows from Oregon to British Columbia.

==== Penstemon davidsonii var. praeteritus ====
Cronquist described this variety in 1964. It grow on isolated, dry peaks in the Great Basin. In the state of Nevada known populations come from the Jackson Mountains and the Santa Rosa Range in Humboldt County. In Oregon it occurs on the Pueblo Mountains and Steens Mountain in Harney County. They are quite isolated from other populations of Penstemon davidsonii.

=== Names ===
Penstemon davidsonii is known by several common names. It is occasionally called "Alpine penstemon". The variety Penstemon davidsonii var. davidsonii is commonly called the "timberline penstemon". It shares the name "creeping penstemon" with Penstemon teucrioides.

== Distribution and habitat ==
Penstemon davidsonii is native to North America from the Sierra Nevada Range in California and Nevada through the Coast and Cascade ranges of Oregon and Washington into British Columbia.

It grows on rocks or in rocky soils in sunny mountain locations.

=== Conservation ===
The conservation organization NatureServe evaluated Penstemon davidsonii in 2016 and rated it as apparently secure (G4). They also evaluated it in British Columbia and found it to be secure (S5). They have not evaluated the rest of its range.

== See also ==
- List of Penstemon species
