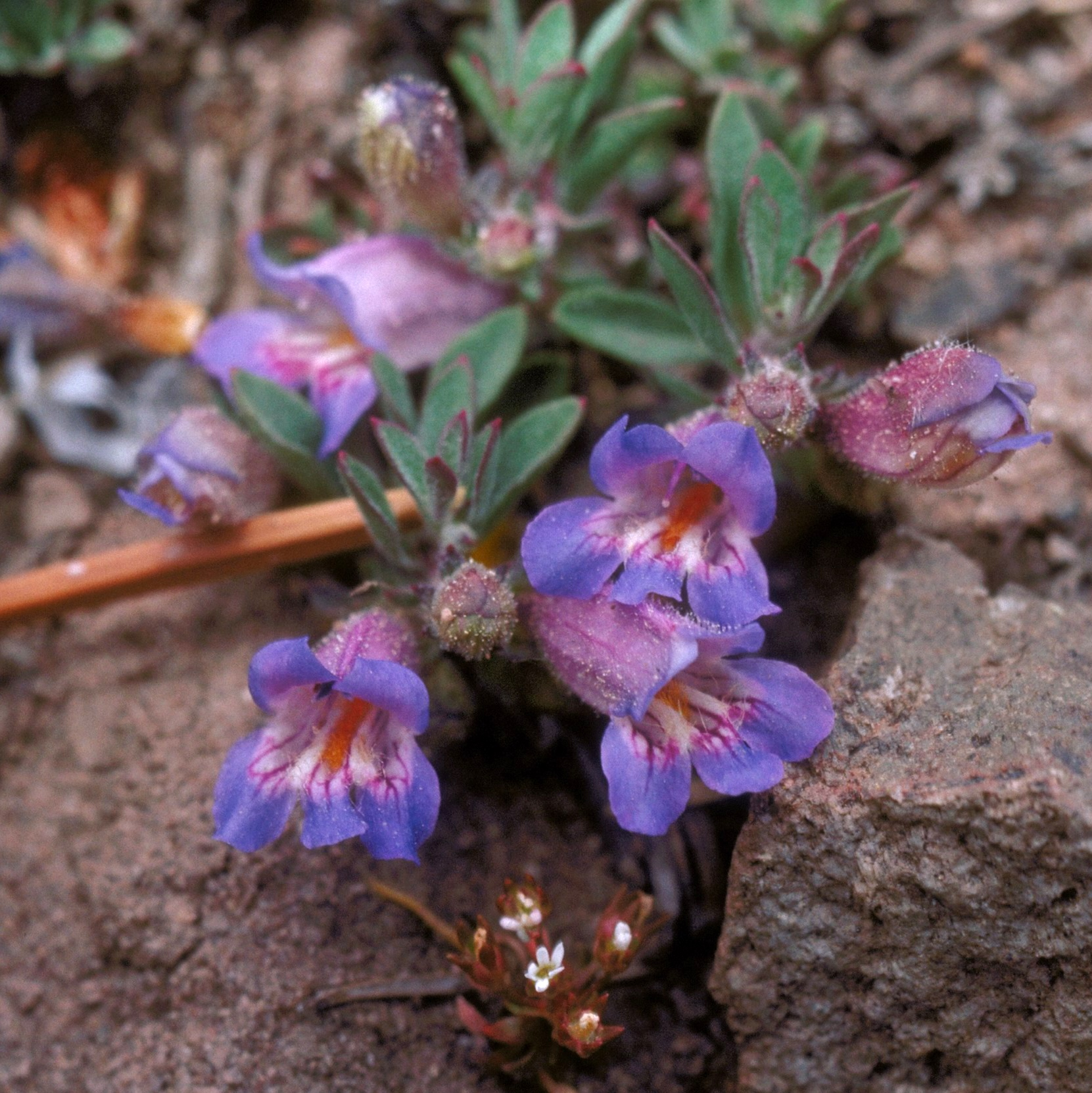
- Penstemon teucrioides, Pike National Forest, south-central Colorado

Conservation status
- Vulnerable (NatureServe)

Scientific classification
- Kingdom: Plantae
- Clade: Tracheophytes
- Clade: Angiosperms
- Clade: Eudicots
- Clade: Asterids
- Order: Lamiales
- Family: Plantaginaceae
- Genus: Penstemon
- Species: P. teucrioides

Binomial name
- Penstemon teucrioides Greene

= Penstemon teucrioides =

Colorado endemic species of penstemon

Penstemon teucrioides, commonly known as grayleaf creeping penstemon, germander penstemon and germander beardtounge, is a perennial species of plant in the large and colorful Penstemon genus. It is a ground hugging plant that is native to just five counties in the mountains of Colorado. Though it has a very limited range it is widely grown in rock gardens.

== Description ==
Penstemon teucrioides is a low growing mat forming species of perennial plant that has somewhat woody stems. Both the leaves and the stems have an somewhat ashy, gray appearance due to dense, pointed, backwards facing hairs. The stems may fully lay down on the ground (prostrate) or may curve upwards towards their ends (ascending). The height of the plant ranges from 2–10 centimeters. The plants may spread to be about 60 centimeters in diameter.

The leaves are arranged in pairs on the stems with five to nine pairs per stem. Leaves are crowded together and are very narrow. The bases of each leaf is tapered while the ends come to a sharp point, usually with the middle vein of the leaf forming an extended tip (mucronate), but sometimes tapering to the tip (acuminate). They are 4–14 millimeters long and just 0.5–1.4 millimeters wide.

=== Flowers ===
Penstemon teucrioides has showy, funnel shaped, blue or violet flowers, with a white or yellowish interior and reddish-violet nectar guides. The fused flower petals are 15–19 millimeters long, with a tube length of about 6–7 millimters and a width of 4–5.5 millimeters. The sterile staminode is covered in covered in yellow-orange hairs and 8–9 millimeters in length. Flowering may be from May to July in its native habitat, but is occasionally as late as August.

=== Chemistry ===
The major iridoids of Penstemon teucrioides are aucubin, isoscrophularioside, and trans-eurostoside. They also have minor amounts of mussaenoside, 8-epiloganin, geniposide, and methyl gardoside.

== Taxonomy ==
Penstemon teucrioides was first scientifically described by Edward Lee Greene in 1901 and given its present binomial. It has no subspecies or synonyms.

=== Names ===
The species name, teucrioides, means resembling Teucrium, a genus of plants commonly called germanders. It is known by the common name creeping penstemon, but it shares this name with at least two other species, Penstemon davidsonii and Penstemon linarioides. To distinguish it from them it is sometimes called the grayleaf creeping penstemon. It is also known as the germander penstemon, germander beardtongue, and mint penstemon.

== Distribution and habitat ==
Penstemon teucrioides is found in central and southern mountains of Colorado. It is endemic to the state of Colorado and has been found in just five counties, Park, Chaffee, Gunnison, Hinsdale, and Saguache. A reported collection of the species from Rio Arriba County, New Mexico in 1915 is generally regarded as an error. Its range is estimated to be 56,430 square kilometers (21,790 sq mi) with somewhere between 21 and 80 local populations.

Though it grows in the mountains, this species is found in the sagebrush steppe lands within the mountains such as in South Park and the upper drainage of the Gunnison River. It grows at elevations of 2200–3400 meters.

=== Conservation ===
Grayleaf creeping penstemon was evaluated by NatureServe in 2023 and rated as vulnerable globally (G3) and at the state level (S3). It is widespread in western Colorado, but is vulnerable to climate change and might have been reduced in numbers by the 2020–2023 North American drought.

== Ecology ==
Though it is not a major source of food, the eastern deer mouse has been observed to eat the seeds of Penstemon teucrioides in September. The parasitic flower orange paintbrush uses P. teucrioides as a host and takes the plant toxin aucubin (see chemistry) in addition to taking energy from it.

== Cultivation ==
Though its range is restricted, grayleaf creeping penstemon is much more widely cultivated in North America and in the United Kingdom. It is noted as being more vigorous in cultivation than the closely related mat penstemon or Thompson's beardtongue by the penstemon experts David Way and Peter James. As is typical of penstemons, they require well drained soil and prefer sand or small rock chips, but are not particular about soil pH. They are typically grown in rock gardens or troughs due to their very short height. The seeds take about eight weeks to germinate. The seeds have relatively low germination rates, only 20% after 30 days at 21°C and also 20% in six days when planted at 4.5°C and then raised to 21°C. It is winter hardy in USDA zones 4–8.

== See also ==
- List of Penstemon species
