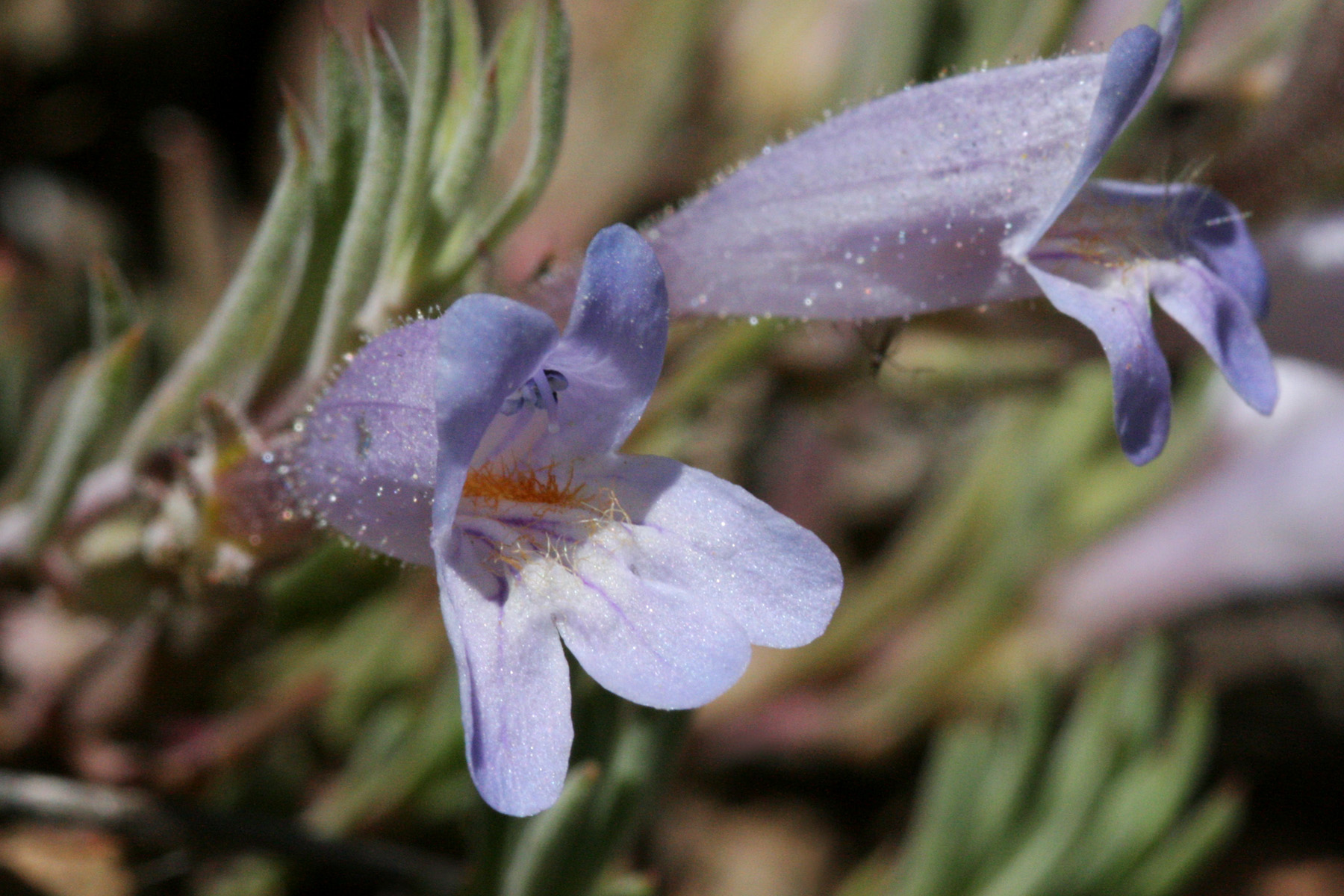
- Penstemon caespitosus in Cochetopa Canyon, southeast of Gunnison, Colorado, and north of Iris, Colorado

Conservation status
- Secure (NatureServe)

Scientific classification
- Kingdom: Plantae
- Clade: Tracheophytes
- Clade: Angiosperms
- Clade: Eudicots
- Clade: Asterids
- Order: Lamiales
- Family: Plantaginaceae
- Genus: Penstemon
- Species: P. caespitosus

Binomial name
- Penstemon caespitosus Nutt. ex A.Gray

Varieties
- Penstemon caespitosus var. caespitosus; Penstemon caespitosus var. desertipicti (A.Nelson) N.H.Holmgren; Penstemon caespitosus var. perbrevis (Pennell) N.H.Holmgren

Synonyms
- Penstemon desertipicti

= Penstemon caespitosus =

Plant species in the plantain family

Penstemon caespitosus, commonly known as mat penstemon, is a summer blooming perennial flower in the large Penstemon genus. It is a widespread plant from near timberline to the foothills in the Southern Rocky Mountains and Colorado Plateau in North America. It is noted for its ground hugging growth habit and as a plant used in xeriscape and rock gardening.

== Description ==
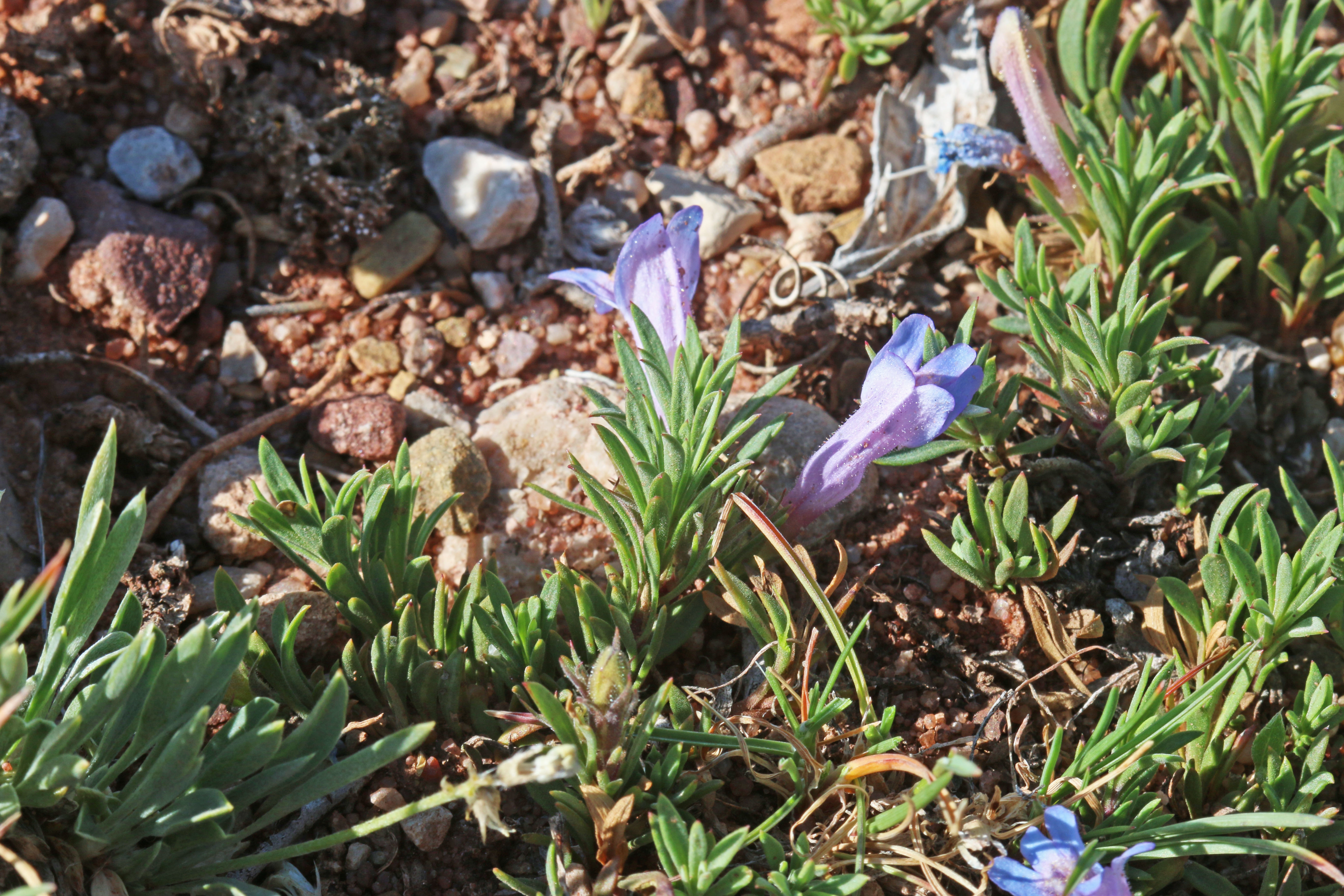
Penstemon caespitosus, photo taken 10 miles north of Vernal, Utah

Penstemon caespitosus is very low growing, usually just 4–5 centimeters (1.6–2.0 in) tall with the stems laying down and only the tips curving upright. Most often individual stems are 2–8 centimeters (0.79–3.15 in) in length, but occasionally will be 10 centimeters (3.9 in) long. Older stems will be woody and have many branches. The stems root at nodes eventually forming solid mat up to 2 meters (6 ft 7 in) in width. The stems have small backwards pointing (retrorse) hairs giving the stems a rough texture, but not giving them an ashy appearance.

The leaves of Penstemon caespitosus are attached by a short leaf stem to the main stems, rather than to the base of the plant, each stem having 3–20 pairs of leaves. Like the stems they are covered in pointed backwards facing hairs, but they do not hide the green color of the leaves. The leaves are variable in shape from being wider at the end than at the base (blade obovate to spatulate) or fairly narrow and grass like (linear) with a tapered base. Their size range from 2.5-14 millimeters long and 1–4 millimeters wide, though occasionally they may be a long as 21 millimeters. The tips of their leaves can be rounded, narrowly pointed, or even have the leaf's main rib sticking out to form a sharp tip (mucronate).

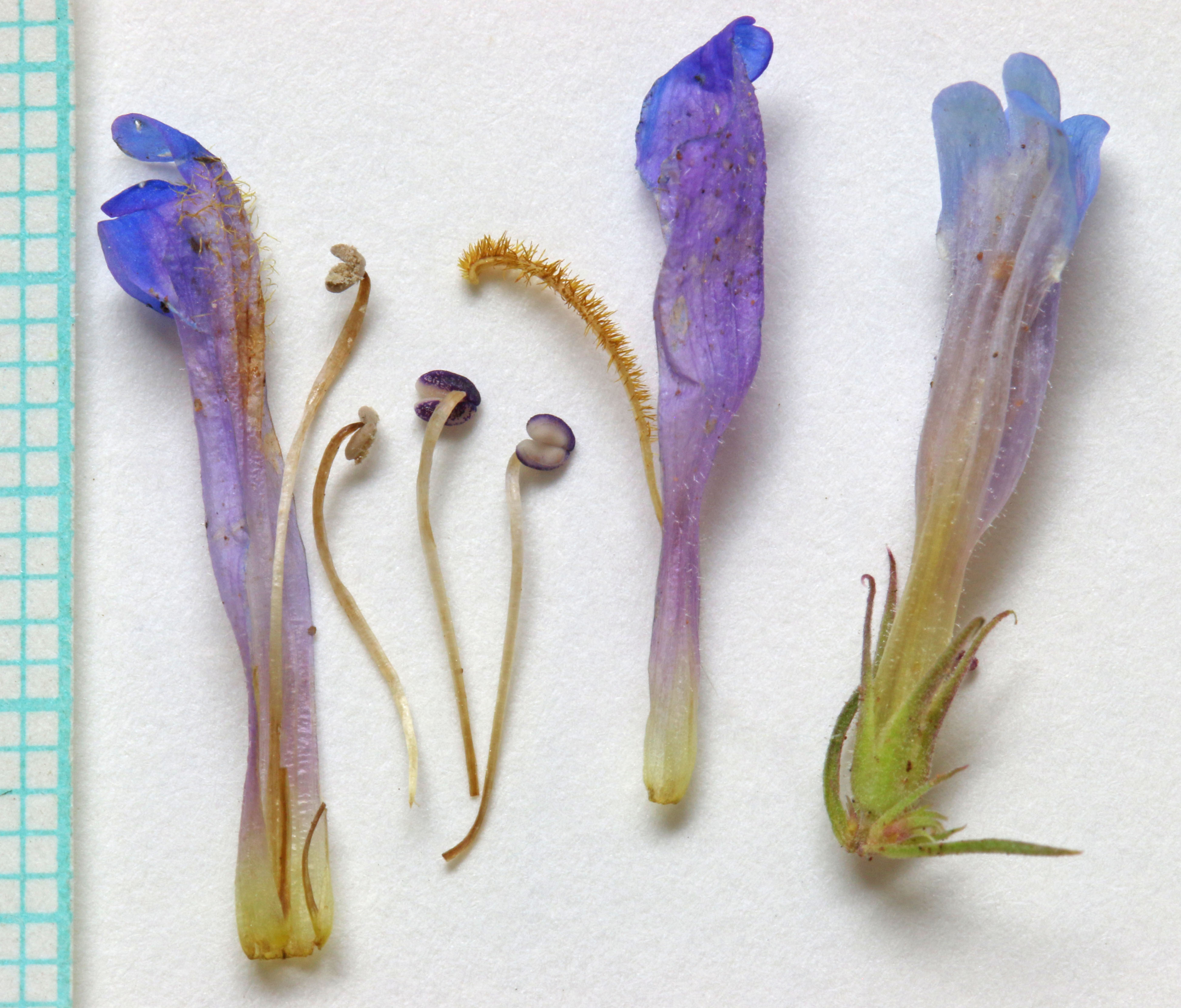
Penstemon caespitosus, dissected flower

The flowering season is as early as April and as late as July or August. The flowers are a variant on the classic penstemon structure of the petals being united into a tube, in this case with five narrow lobes with rounded ends, 4–6.5 mm in length and 1–1.5 mm wide. Overall the flowers are 10–17 millimeters long, though in exceptional cases they may be as long as 21 millimeters with a funnel to bell shape to the tube. As with the leaves and stems they flowers are retrorsely hairy, though they also will have sparse glandular hairs. The externally the flowers are a handsome blue to purplish lavender with reddish violet nectar guides on the petal lobes into the interior. On the lower surface of the flower tube there will be two ridges. The interior of the flower tube is more white-ish in color with the 5–6 millimeter long tube lined with villous hairs. Each flower has four stamens, the longer two stamens will reach or extend slightly beyond the opening of the flower tube. The pollen sacs at the end of the stamens are 0.6–1.2 millimeters in diameter. The hairy staminode for which Penstemon are known 9–12 millimeters long and covered at the end with densely pilose bright golden yellow hairs. The female style is 13–15 millimeters long.

The four lobed seed capsules are relatively small, 3.5–5 mm long by 3–4 mm wide. One widely recognized species, Penstemon crandallii, is similar enough to Penstemon caespitosus to be confused with it.

== Taxonomy ==
The first recorded scientific collection of Penstemon caespitosus was by Thomas Nuttall and is assumed to have been on his expedition to Oregon in 1834. It was named and more completely described by Asa Gray in 1862, but with the then common "correction" to the genus name to Pentstemon. It had also been collected by John C. Frémont during one of his expeditions, but the condition of the specimen when examined by Gray was, "poor". Botanist William A. Weber thought that Penstemon crandallii and its varieties not distinct enough to qualify as species and that it should be synonymized with P. caespitosus. Two subspecies of P. caepitosus have been identified and are recognized by Plants of the World Online (POWO), the USDA Natural Resources Conservation Service PLANTS database (PLANTS), and the Flora of North America (FNA) as of 2023.

- Penstemon caespitosus var. caespitosus
- Penstemon caespitosus var. desertipicti (A.Nelson) N.H.Holmgren
- Penstemon caespitosus var. perbrevis (Pennell) N.H.Holmgren

Penstemon caespitosus var. caespitosus is the nominate subspecies. Compared to the others it more consistently has stems that turn upwards at the end compared to var. perbrevis and has smaller flowers than var. desertipicti. The main differences recorded in the FNA are the leaves are sometimes linear and the pollen sacs are explanate. However, sometimes the leaves of this variety are blade oblanceolate, similar or identical to the other varieties. This variety's range overlaps with var. perbrevis, but does not with var. desertipicti and is recorded by both POWO and PLANTS as growing in Colorado, Utah, and Wyoming.

Penstemon caespitosus var. desertipicti was first described by Aven Nelson in 1926 as a separate species, Penstemon desertipicti and then as a subspecies by David D. Keck in 1937. However, a more complete and accurate description was published by Noel H. Holmgren in 1979. The physical characteristic noted by Keck as distinguishing it from var. caespitosus is having much broader flower tubes. In FNA the primary differences recorded are only having blade oblanceolate leaves and never linear, blade obovate, or spatulate leaves as well as having navicular pollen sacs. In 2011 it was found that this variety is 4n, a tetraploid. Both POWO and PLANTS record this variety of P. caespitosus as growing in Utah and Arizona and being absent from the Rocky Mountains, this geographic isolation also being an argument for being a separate subspecies despite physical similarity.

Penstemon caespitosus var. perbrevis was first described as a subspecies in 1920 by Francis W. Pennell. As with var. desertipicti it was more completely and accurately described by Noel H. Holmgren in 1979. Pennell described the difference from var. caespitosus as being mainly in that the stems do not turn upwards at the ends, but also that it has leaves that are wider at the ends with a longer and narrower base (spatulate). In this the FNA is in agreement, recording the leaves as ranging in shape from blade obovate to spatulate. In addition describes the variety as having navicular to subexplanate pollen sacs in contrast to the other varieties. Both POWO and PLANTS record this variety of P. caespitosus as growing in Utah and Colorado, with PLANTS specifically recording places of overlap in range in Utah and not having specific location information about the subspecies in Colorado.

== Habitat and distribution ==
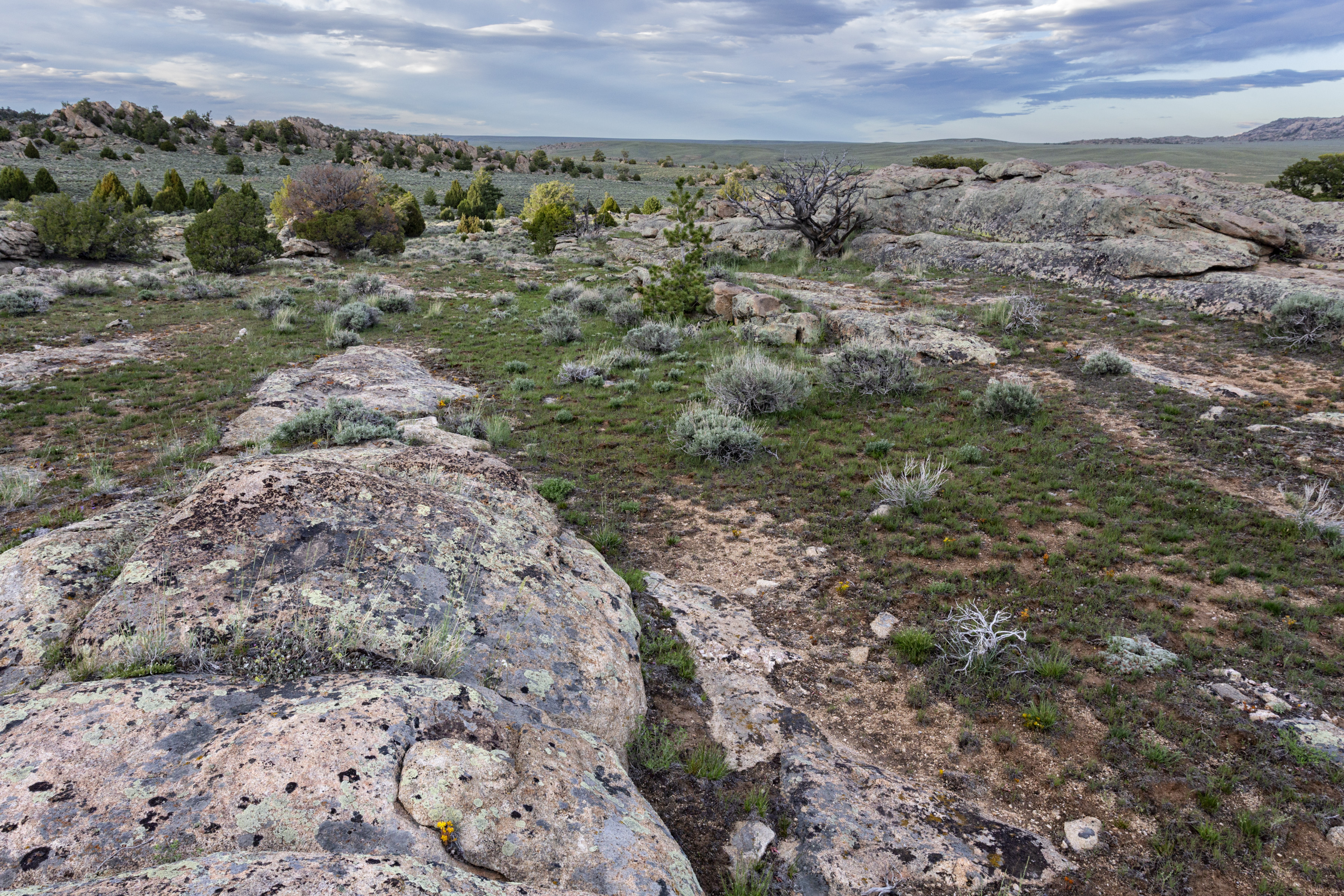
Penstemon caespitosus habitat in Wyoming, Long Creek Mountain

Penstemon caespitosus grows in sagebrush scrublands, juniper savannas, openings in pinyon-juniper woodlands, with scrub oak, ponderosa pine woodlands, forb-grass openings in aspen-conifer communities, and in alpine meadows. Their altitude range is from as low as 1,500 meters (4,900 ft) to as high as 3,500 meters (11,500 ft).

Both POWO and PLANTS record Penstemon caespitosus in four western US states, Arizona, Colorado, Utah, and Wyoming. Most of the populations in Colorado and Wyoming are located west of the continental divide, but with a few populations found to the east. NatureServe assessed P. caespitosus as globally secure (G5) in 1984. At the state level they assess populations in Colorado as apparently secure (S4), Wyoming populations as imperiled (S2), and Utah as critically imperiled (S1).

== Ecology ==
The specialist bee Osmia brevis, which is an oligolege that only visits Penstemon flowers, was observed visiting Penstemon caespitosus by A.L. McMullen. Penstemon caespitosa is considered important for supporting the pollinators of the rare species Penstemon debilis by United States Fish and Wildlife Service.

== Cultivation ==
Mat penstemon is amenable to cultivation and is widely grown in both Europe and America as a groundcover especially in rock gardens for xeriscaping. It is recommended by the Royal Horticultural Society for planting in crevice gardens. In comparison to Penstemon thompsoniae and Penstemon teucrioides, it is less sensitive to moisture because it evolved to live in less extreme environments in the Rockies. Though more tolerant of moisture than other mat forming species it is, like most penstemons, susceptible to root rot in poorly draining locations. It is especially intolerant of excess moisture immediately after its blooming period. However, it will grow on clay containing soils in dry conditions and is generally healthier on lean soils low in organic matter. They are quite suitable for a rock garden, but are too vigorously spreading for trough planting with other plants. The seeds of mat penstemon were experimentally germinated using gibberellic acid sprinkled over seeds on wet paper towels at a dosage of approximately 1000 ppm and this resulted in 30% germination after six weeks while there was no germination from cold treatment alone.

A number of named cultivars of the mat penstemon are available in the horticultural trade. 'Claude Barr', also sometimes called 'Denver Botanical Gardens' is a form with smaller rounded leaves. 'Bruce Alexander' is a cultivar with white flowers and yellow-green leaves. 'Waggon wheel' introduced in 2022 by the Plant Select cooperative sponsored by Colorado State University and Denver Botanic Gardens. Mat penstemon is hardy in USDA zones 4–7.

== See also ==
List of Penstemon species
