= USS Monongahela (1862) =

Cargo ship of the United States Navy

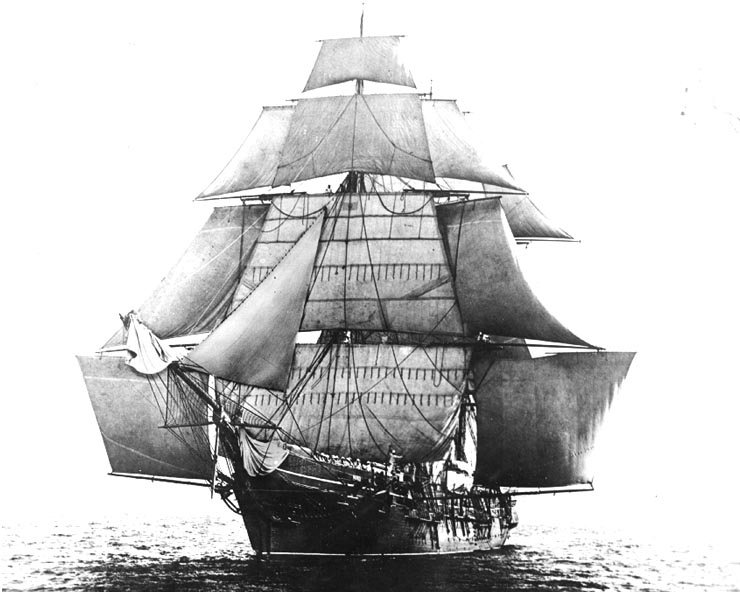
- USS Monongahela under full sail.

History

United States
- Name: USS Monongahela
- Namesake: Monongahela River
- Builder: Philadelphia Navy Yard
- Launched: July 10, 1862
- Commissioned: January 15, 1863
- Fate: Destroyed by fire on March 17, 1908

General characteristics
- Type: Sloop-of-war
- Displacement: 2,078 long tons (2,111 t)
- Length: 227 ft (69 m)
- Beam: 38 ft (12 m)
- Draft: 17 ft 6 in (5.33 m)
- Propulsion: Steam engine
- Sail plan: barkentine
- Speed: 8.5 kn (9.8 mph; 15.7 km/h)
- Armament: 1 × 200-pounder Parrott rifle, 2 × 11" guns, 2 × 24-pounder guns, 2 × 12-pounder guns

USS Monongahela was a barkentine–rigged screw sloop-of-war that served in the Union Navy during the American Civil War. Her task was to participate in the Union blockade of the Confederate States of America. Post-war, she continued serving her country in various roles, such as that of a storeship and schoolship.

== Service history ==
=== American Civil War ===
Monongahela—the first United States Navy ship to bear that name—was built by the Philadelphia Navy Yard and was launched on July 10, 1862; sponsored by Ms. Emily V. Hoover, daughter of Naval Constructor Hoover who superintended the ship's construction; and commissioned on January 15, 1863, Captain James P. McKinstry in command. Initially assigned to the North Atlantic Squadron, Monongahela sailed instead to reinforce Rear Admiral David G. Farragut's West Gulf Blockading Squadron off Mobile, Alabama, remaining on duty off that port until ordered to attempt to run past Confederate batteries on the Mississippi River at Port Hudson, Louisiana on the night of March 14–15, 1863. As Army forces ashore conducted a mortar bombardment, the squadron got underway about 22:00, heavier ships USS Hartford, USS Richmond, and Monongahela screening the smaller USS Albatross, USS Genesee, and USS Kineo from the forts, with steam frigate USS Mississippi bringing up the rear.

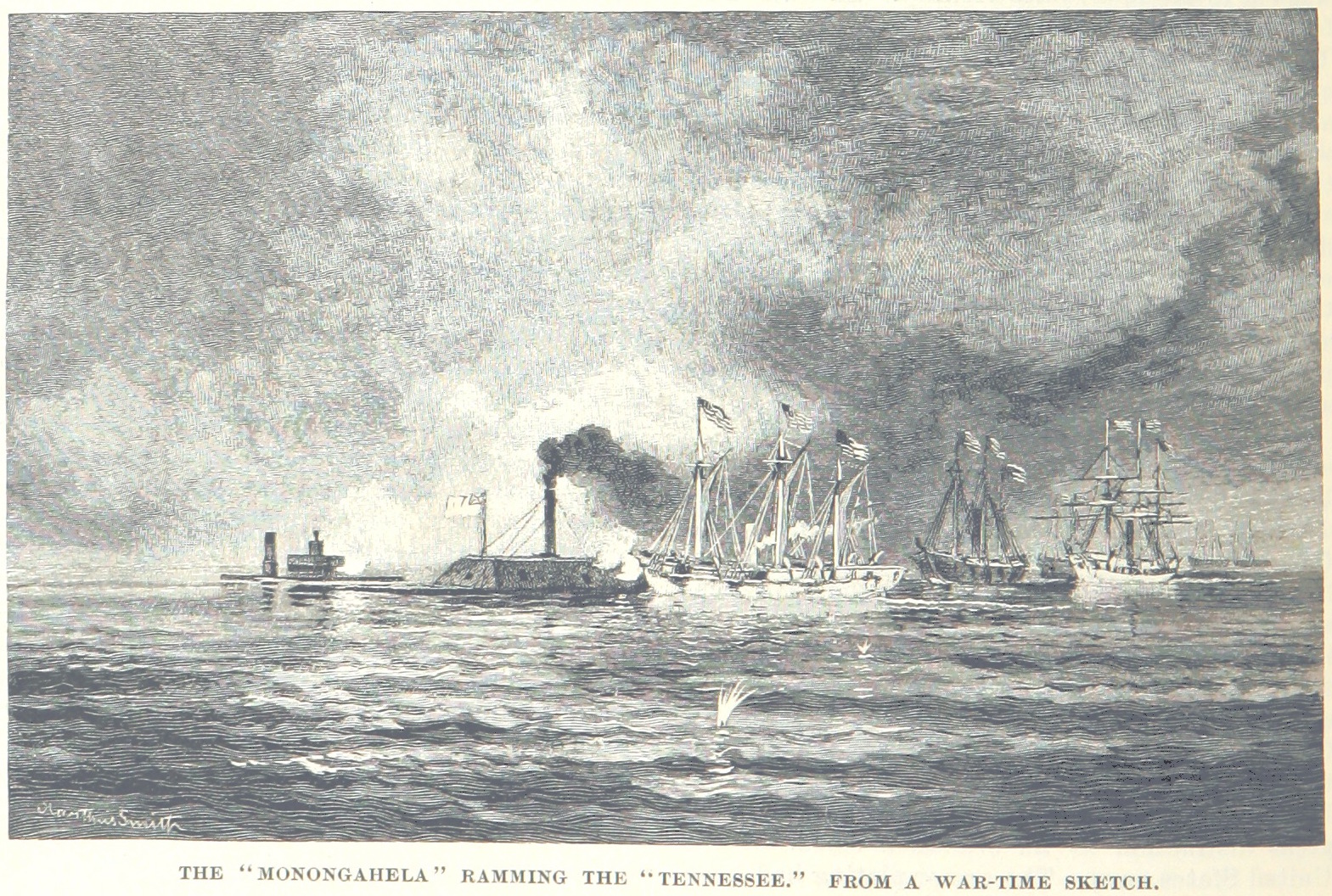
Monongahela rams CSS Tennessee

In the course of the ensuing furious engagement, only Hartford and Albatross succeeded in passing upriver, Richmond losing her steam power early in the battle and drifting downstream out of range with Genesee lashed alongside. Monongahela grounded under the guns of a heavy battery, taking a pounding and losing six men killed and 21 wounded, including the captain, until she worked loose with Kineo's aid. While attempting to continue upriver, her overloaded engine broke down, and the sloop was forced to drift downstream with Kineo. Mississippi—grounding at high speed—was hit repeatedly and set afire, eventually blowing up and ending the engagement.

On 27 May, Confederate defenders turned back a major assault on Port Hudson following constant bombardment by Monongahela, serving as temporary flagship of Admiral Farragut, and other ships of the squadron. On July 7, the ship, in company with USS New London, engaged southern field batteries behind the levee, 12 mi (19 km) below Donaldsonville, Louisiana, Monongahela's new skipper Commander Abner Read being killed in this action. She then departed on October 26 for Brazos Santiago, Texas, to support General Nathaniel Banks' troops in the capture of that town and Brownsville from November 2–4, in addition capturing several blockade runners. Monongahela continued her duty off Texas, covering the landing of 1,000 Union troops on Mustang Island, Aransas Pass, Texas on November 16–17 and supporting a Union reconnaissance at Pass Cavallo on the gulf shore of Matagorda Peninsula from December 31, 1863, to January 1, 1864. She returned to blockade off Mobile, soon after, stopping numerous blockade runners throughout the spring and summer of 1864.

On July 15, the warship's boats conducted a reconnaissance of the Mobile Bay area to determine the Confederate torpedo (naval mines) defenses; and then on August 3, Admiral Farragut took his stripped-for-action squadron of 18 ships, including four monitors, against those defenses. In the fierce fight and great victory that followed, Monongahela bombarded Confederate forts and then rammed the heavy Confederate ram Tennessee. The sloop succeeded only in damaging herself in the full speed drive into the armored enemy ship, but combined heavy gunfire from the other Union ships forced the Confederate warship to surrender, ending the battle and closing the last major gulf port to the South. Monongahela remained on duty with the West Gulf squadron until the end of the Civil War.

=== Post-war career ===
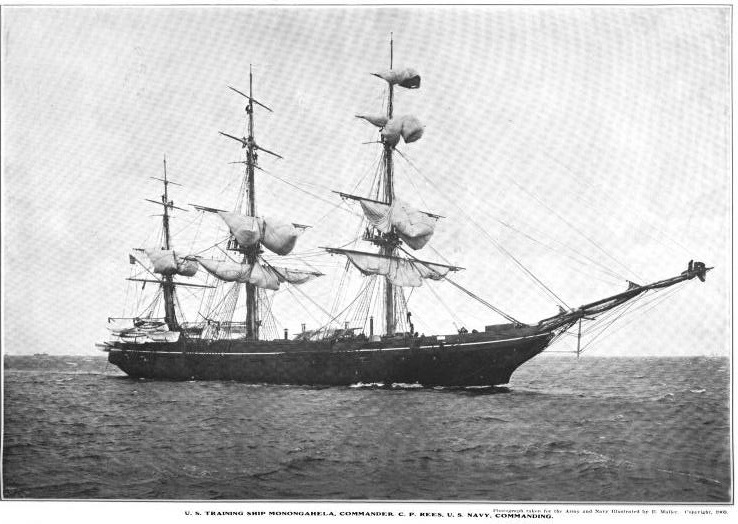
United States training ship Monongahela, around 1903

Post-war, Monongahela was assigned to the West Indies Squadron. While on service with the West Indies Squadron, the warship had the unique experience of being landed high and dry 91 meters inland from the shoreline when a tsunami struck Frederiksted, St. Croix on November 18, 1867. Following an earthquake, and probable submarine landslide from the 15,000' deep trench to the North, she was hit by a wall of water 25 to 30 ft (7.6 to 9.1 m) high and carried over the beach and warehouses to come to rest on an even keel some distance from the water. A working party of mechanics from New York Navy Yard under Naval Constructor Thomas Davidson succeeded in refloating the ship on May 11, 1868, following a four-month endeavor. Monongahela was towed to New York City and thence to Portsmouth where she was slowly repaired, finally departing in 1873 to join the South Atlantic Station.

Following a three-year cruise on that duty, the steam sloop served as a training ship off the east coast and then departed for the Asiatic Station, serving in the Far East until the need of repairs took her to Mare Island Navy Yard in 1879 where she decommissioned. In 1883, the veteran warship was converted to a supply ship, with all her machinery being removed that fall to make additional room for supplies. During the conversion, her rig was changed to bark to allow her handling by a smaller crew. Monongahela continued her duty in the Pacific Squadron as storeship at Callao, Peru in 1890, and then sailed around Cape Horn to Portsmouth Navy Yard to be fitted out as an apprentice training ship. Emerging from the refit a full-rigged ship, the old converted sloop joined the Training Squadron in 1891, serving in that capacity until relieving USS Constellation on May 15, 1894, as U.S. Naval Academy Practice Ship. Making annual cruises each year except for 1898, when the war with Spain intervened, the ship conducted her last Academy cruise from June 6 – September 4, 1899, sailing to England and Portugal.

Upon completion of this cruise, the Monongahela became a training ship for apprentices at the Naval Training Station in Newport, Rhode Island. She served for three years in that capacity and cruised to ports throughout Europe's Atlantic coast and the Caribbean. Finally detached from the Atlantic Training Squadron on May 9, 1904, the old warship served as a storeship at Guantanamo Bay, Cuba until totally destroyed by fire on March 17, 1908. A 4-inch breech-loading gun was salvaged from Monongahela's wreck and put on display at the Naval Station. Since the gun was slightly deformed by the heat from the fire, it was nicknamed "Ole Droopy". This gun is now on display on Deer Point near the Bay Club.

== See also ==
- List of sloops of war of the United States Navy
