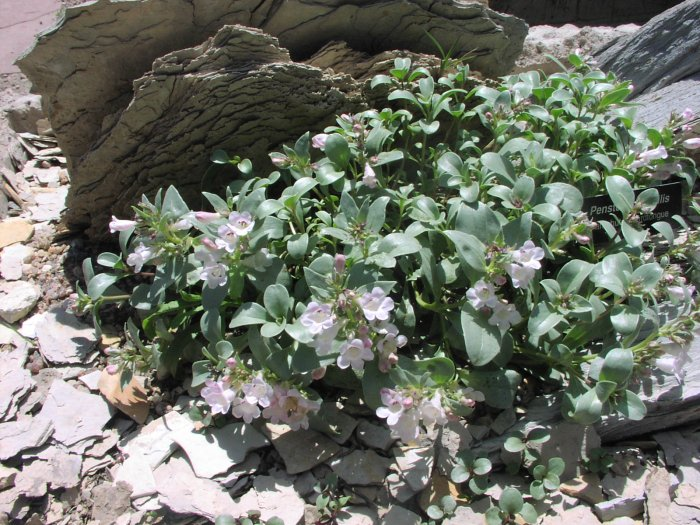

Conservation status
- Threatened (ESA)

Scientific classification
- Kingdom: Plantae
- Clade: Tracheophytes
- Clade: Angiosperms
- Clade: Eudicots
- Clade: Asterids
- Order: Lamiales
- Family: Plantaginaceae
- Genus: Penstemon
- Species: P. debilis

Binomial name
- Penstemon debilis O'Kane & J.L.Anderson

= Penstemon debilis =

Species of flowering plant

Penstemon debilis, the Parachute penstemon or Parachute beardtongue, is one of the rarest plants in North America, found only 5 places in the world, all of them located on the Roan Plateau in Garfield County, of Western Colorado. The Denver Botanic Gardens has the Parachute penstemon on display with other native plants of the Roan Plateau. The name Parachute comes from the small town in Colorado, Parachute, Colorado, close to where the plant can be found.

The plant is small and low to the ground. It has small green leaves and pale light-lavender flowers. It grows in steep slopes on shale, where little vegetation grows. The area is very arid and has sparse vegetation, containing sages, grasses and bushes.

The Parachute penstemon has been identified to qualify for protection under the Endangered Species Act by the United States Fish and Wildlife Service, but failed to be protected, due to large amounts of natural gas in the area. In 2004, the Center for Native Ecosystems, along with the Colorado Native Plant Society and two independent botanists formally requested protection. On July 27, 2011, the plant was federally listed as a threatened species of the United States, a ruling which took effect on August 26, 2011.

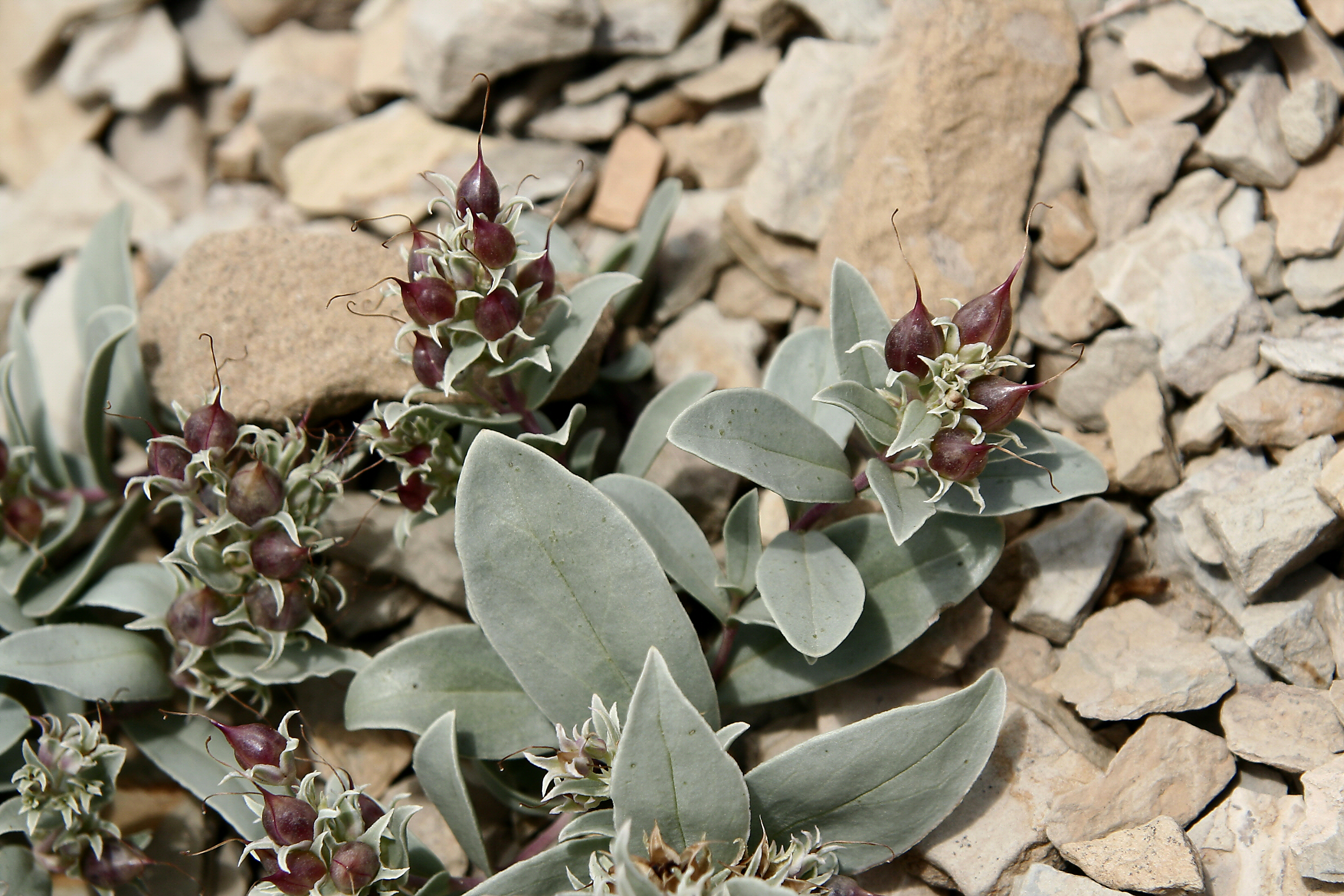
Penstemon debilis with fruits

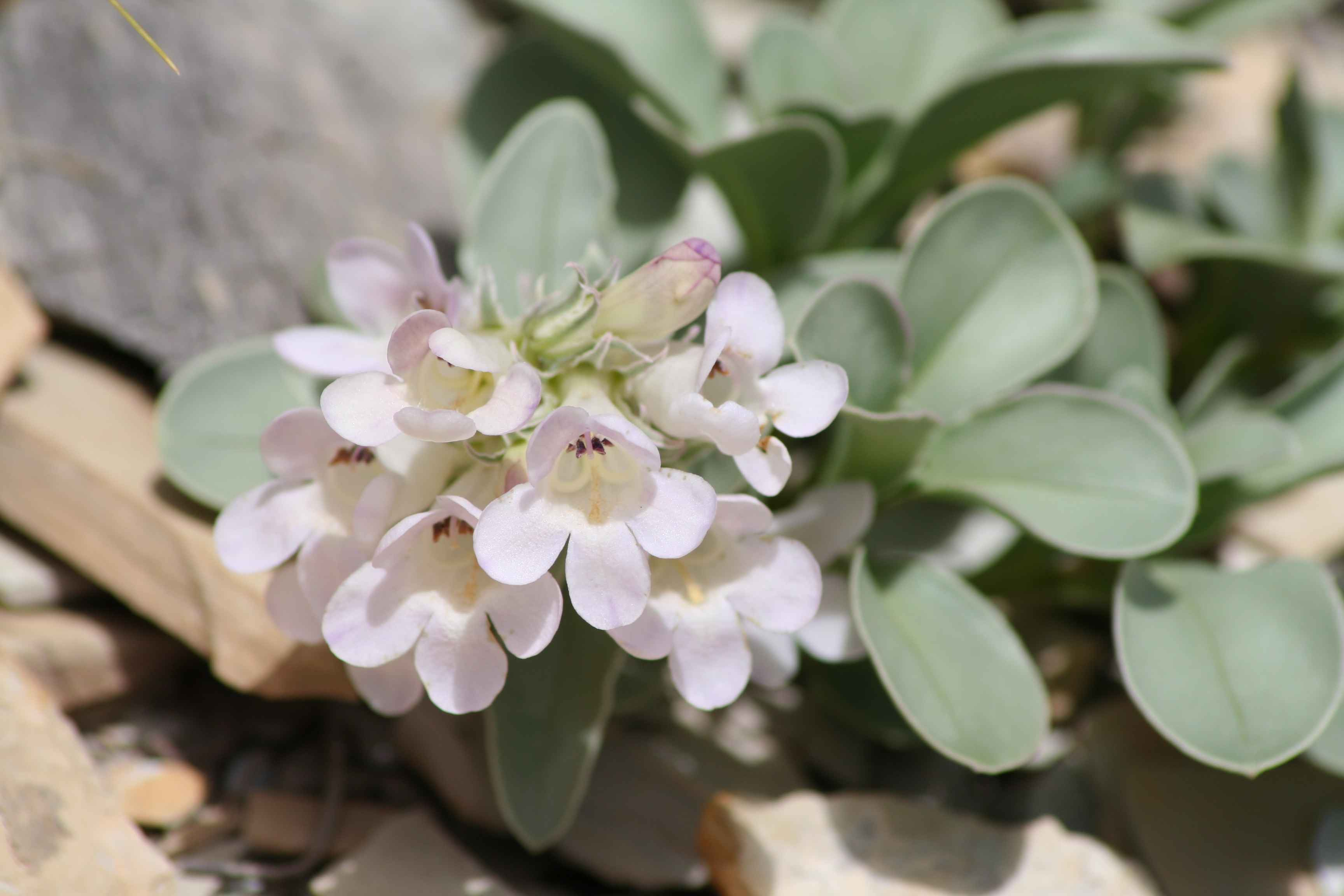
Flowering specimen

== See also ==
- List of Penstemon species
