= Thomas Davidson (naval architect) =

American (1828–1874)

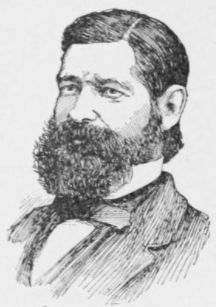
- Born: 28 August 1828; Nottingham, England
- Died: 18 February 1874 (aged 45); Philadelphia, Pennsylvania, United States
- Occupation: Naval architect

Thomas Davidson (28 August 1828 – 18 February 1874) was a naval constructor for the United States Navy.

== Biography ==
Davidson was born in Nottingham, England on 28 August 1828. He came to the United States at the age of four with his parents, and settled in Philadelphia. Early on, he developed a talent for mechanical invention and construction, following which he was apprenticed to the trade of ship building with Matthew Van Dusen, while also studying mathematics with his brother George Davidson. His capabilities soon attracted the attention of John Lenthall, then chief constructor of the U. S. Navy.

In 1850, at the age of 22, he built his first vessel "from the stumps" on the banks of the James River, and soon after entered into business in Philadelphia. In 1861, he was appointed quartermaster over the ship carpenters in the Philadelphia Navy Yard, and in 1863 was promoted to assistant naval constructor. He attained the full grade in 1866 with the relative rank of commander, the office which he held until his death. At one time during the Civil War he conducted repairs of 42 vessels, both large and small, at the Philadelphia Navy Yard, and also built several new ships. The Tuscarora, sister ship of the Kearsarge, was built under his direction in 58 working days, and the Miami in 27 days. His greatest feat was the building, in 70 days, of the Juniata (1,240 tons, 7 guns) from the frame of a Florida live-oak frigate that had been seasoned for 23 years.

Davidson displayed his engineering abilities in the floating of the Monongahela, which had been driven inland on Santa Cruz Island during the earthquake of 18 November 1867, and left stranded 40 feet (12 m) high. With a body of skilled men selected from different navy yards, in a little over three months he succeeded in moving the ship sideways to the water's edge, and thence for 2,500 feet (760 m) over a bed of coral to deep water.

Subsequently, he was ordered on duty at the bureau of construction in Washington, and was busy with plans for developing a navy of armored vessels, torpedo boats, and fast cruisers. The models and drawings for the first large torpedo boats built in New York were executed by him. Davidson was about to be sent to Europe for an exhaustive study of foreign navies and navy yards when his health failed, leading to his death at the age of 45, in Philadelphia.

== See also ==
- USS Monongahela (1862)
