= George Davidson (geographer) =

British geodesist, astronomer, geographer, surveyor & engineer (1825-1911)

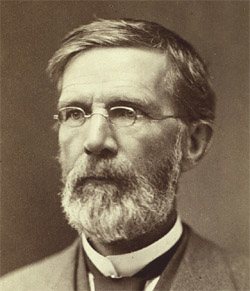
- Born: May 9, 1825; Nottingham, England, United Kingdom
- Died: December 1, 1911 (aged 86); San Francisco, California, United States
- Scientific career
- Fields: Geography

George Davidson (May 9, 1825 – December 1, 1911) was a geodesist, astronomer, geographer, surveyor and engineer in the United States.

== Biography ==
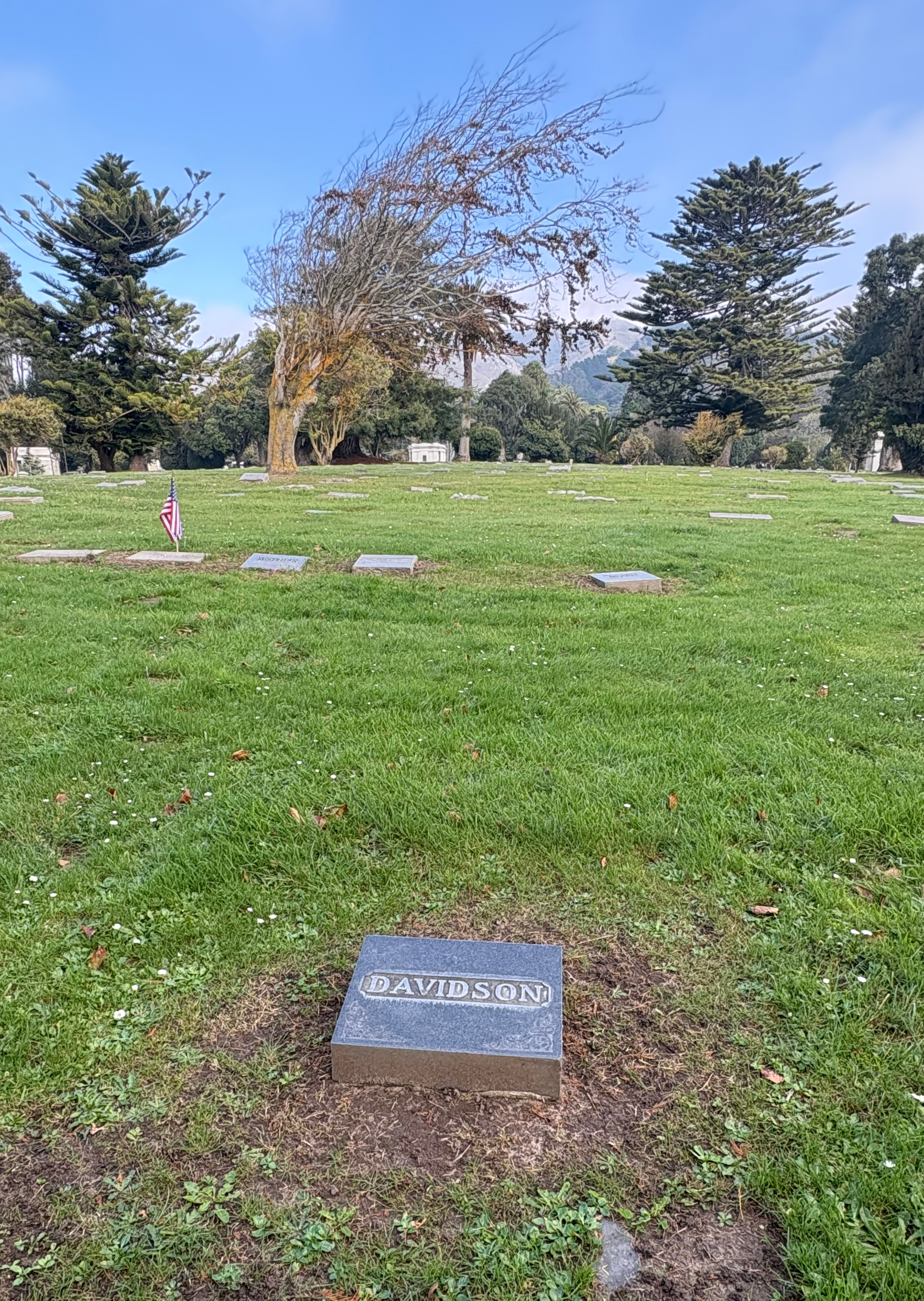
Davidson's grave at Cypress Lawn Memorial Park

Born on May 9, 1825, in England, he went to the U.S. in 1832 with his parents, who settled in Pennsylvania. He graduated at the Central High School in Philadelphia in 1845, standing first in his class. While a student, he had shown interest in scientific work, and had assisted Alexander D. Bache in his observations of the magnetic elements at Girard College. Upon his graduation in 1845, he began his career as clerk to Bache who was superintendent of the United States Coast Survey.

From 1846 to 1850, Davidson was occupied in geodesy, and in astronomy, serving in the different states on the east coast of the United States. In 1850, Bache sent him to California at the rank of Coast Survey assistant. For the next decade, Davidson engaged in field work to determine the exact latitude and longitude of prominent capes, bays, etc., and of the magnetic elements of the Pacific Coast, reporting also upon the proper locations for lighthouses. His work included a survey of Washington, Cape Flattery, and Puget sounds, and he had charge of the main triangulation of the coast in the region of San Francisco. Davidson also initiated triangulation of the Channel Islands between San Pedro Bay and Point Conception. In 1853, he named a number of mountains in the Olympic Mountains: he named Mount Ellinor for Ellinor Fauntleroy, who later became his wife, Mount Constance for Ellinor's older sister and The Brothers for her two brothers.

From 1861 until 1867, he was again on the Atlantic seaboard, principally engaged in engineering work on coast and river defences. At one time, he was in command of the Coast Survey steamer Vixen, and later performed astronomical work along the eastern coast.

In 1866, he became chief engineer of an expedition for the survey of a ship canal across the Isthmus of Darien. That same year, he was elected as a member to the American Philosophical Society. In 1867, he was appointed to make a special examination and report upon the geography and resources of Alaska, pending its purchase; his published report and conferences with congressional committees influenced the passage of the bill. He was placed in charge, during 1867, of the work of the Coast Survey on the Pacific, planned work for the land parties from 1868 until 1875, and inspected all the fields of work. He traveled extensively in Egypt, China, India and Europe, for purposes of scientific study.

From 1876 to 1886, he had charge of the main triangulation and astronomical work on the west coast; the records of the computing division showed that the results of his observations stood higher than any ever executed in America, Europe, or India, and they were characterized as "unique in the history of geodesy." In 1881, Davidson twice measured the Yolo base line, one of the geodesic base lines that formed the foundation of triangulating distances in California. At that time, it was the longest base line yet attempted in trigonometrical operations, and the system of triangulation directly connected therewith was called in his honor the "Davidson quadrilaterals". He also measured the Los Angeles base line three times in 1888–1889. He retired from what by then had been renamed the United States Coast and Geodetic Survey in 1895, after 50 years of service.

He founded the Davidson Observatory in San Francisco, which was the first astronomical observatory on the Pacific coast of North America, and in 1869 brought the Pacific geodetic of the coast survey in telegraphic longitude connection with Greenwich. His astronomical work includes the observation of the total solar eclipse under the 60th parallel, in 1869; determination of the 120th meridian, in 1873; charge of the U. S. transit of Venus expedition, in 1874; recovery of the transit of Venus station of 1709 in Lower California occupied by Auteroche de la Chappe; observation of the total solar eclipse of January 7, 1880; and in 1882 charge of the party to observe the transit of Venus in New Mexico.

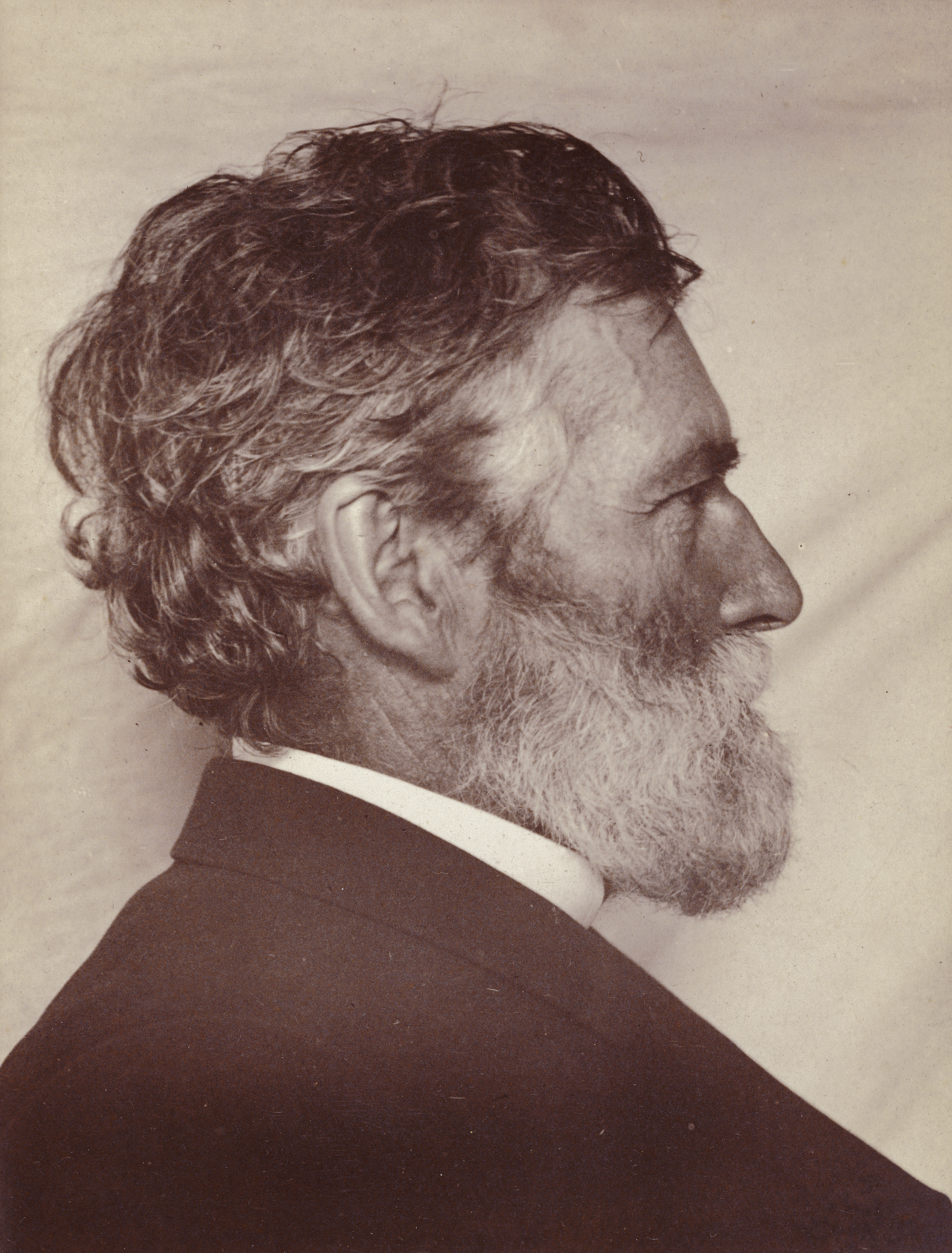
Portrait of George Davidson by Carleton Watkins

Other positions held by Davidson include president of the California Academy of Sciences from 1871 to 1887, Honorary Professor of Geodesy and Astronomy, and Regent of the University of California from 1877 to 1885. After his forced retirement from the Coast Survey in 1895, he became the first professor of geography at the University of California, Berkeley, and chaired that department from 1898 until his retirement in 1905, and remained an emeritus professor until his death. He was succeeded by Ruliff S. Holway. In 1906 he was one of the Founders of Seismological Society of America and its first elected President (1906–1909). Davidson was one of 182 charter members of the Sierra Club in 1892 and served as a member of its board of directors from 1894 to 1910.

He died in San Francisco on December 1, 1911, and was buried at Cypress Lawn Memorial Park in Colma.

== Works ==
- Coast Pilot of California, Oregon and Washington (1857–1887)
- Voyages of Discovery and Exploration on the Northwest Coast of America, 1539-1603 (1887)
- Coast Pilot of Alaska (Part I, 1868)
- The Alaska Boundary (1903)
- The Glaciers of Alaska (1904)
- The Discovery of San Francisco Bay (1907)
- Francis Drake on the Northwest Coast of America (1908)
- Origin and Meaning of the Name California (1910)

He contributed numerous papers to the California Academy of Sciences, and published a quantity of special reports contained in government publications.

== Honors ==
He was awarded the Daly Medal by the American Geographical Society in 1908.

=== Namesakes ===
The Davidson Seamount off the coast of California, Davidson Current, Mount Davidson and Davidson Street in San Francisco are named for George Davidson. The Davidson Glacier south of Haines, Alaska was also named for him.

The United States Coast and Geodetic Survey named two ships for him, the launch USC&GS Davidson, in service from 1933 to 1935, and the coastal hydrographic survey ship USC&GS Davidson (CSS 31), which entered service in the Coast and Geodetic Survey in 1967 and then served in the National Oceanic and Atmospheric Administration fleet as NOAAS Davidson (S 331) from 1970 to 1989.

In 1946, Davidson's daughter Ellinor established the George Davidson Medal, along with the American Geographical Society, to honor her father.

== Family ==
Davidson's brother Thomas Davidson was a naval architect with the United States Navy.
