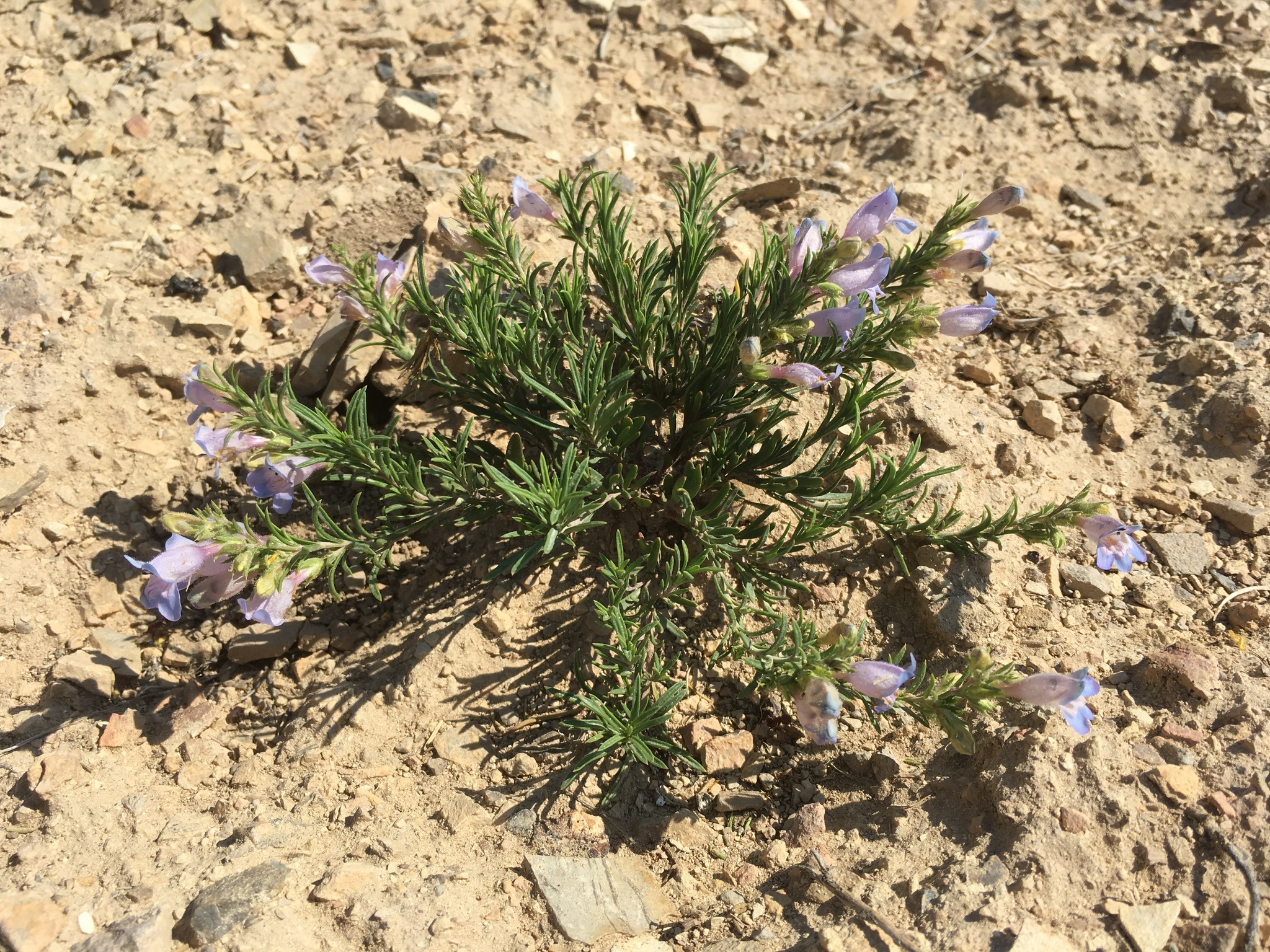
- Penstemon crandallii var. glabrescens

Conservation status
- Apparently Secure (NatureServe)

Scientific classification
- Kingdom: Plantae
- Clade: Tracheophytes
- Clade: Angiosperms
- Clade: Eudicots
- Clade: Asterids
- Order: Lamiales
- Family: Plantaginaceae
- Genus: Penstemon
- Species: P. crandallii

Binomial name
- Penstemon crandallii A.Nelson, 1899

Varieties
- P. crandallii var. atratus (D.D.Keck) N.H.Holmgren; P. crandallii var. crandallii; P. crandallii var. glabrescens (Pennell) C.C.Freeman; P. crandallii var. procumbens (Greene) C.C.Freeman; P. crandallii var. ramaleyi (A.Nelson) C.C.Freeman

Synonyms
- Penstemon crandallii subsp. typicus D.D.Keck

= Penstemon crandallii =

Plant species in the family

Penstemon crandallii, also known as Crandall's penstemon, is a species of penstemon that grows in western Colorado and small parts of New Mexico and Utah. It is a low growing plant with blue to purple flowers.

== Description ==
Penstemon crandallii has stems covered in fine or stiff hairs that point backwards and grow 2 to 28 centimeters long. Their direction of growth ranges all the way from fully upright to prostrate, growing along the ground. Older, more woody stems, often root where they touch the soil.

The leaves are in pairs on the stems attached by petioles, smaller leaf stems, to the main stem. Each leaf ranges from 2 to 47 millimeters long, though usually more than 4 mm, and 0.5 to 8 mm wide. The tips of the leaves are narrowly pointed or are mucronate, having a leaf vein that extends beyond the leaf blade in an extended tip.

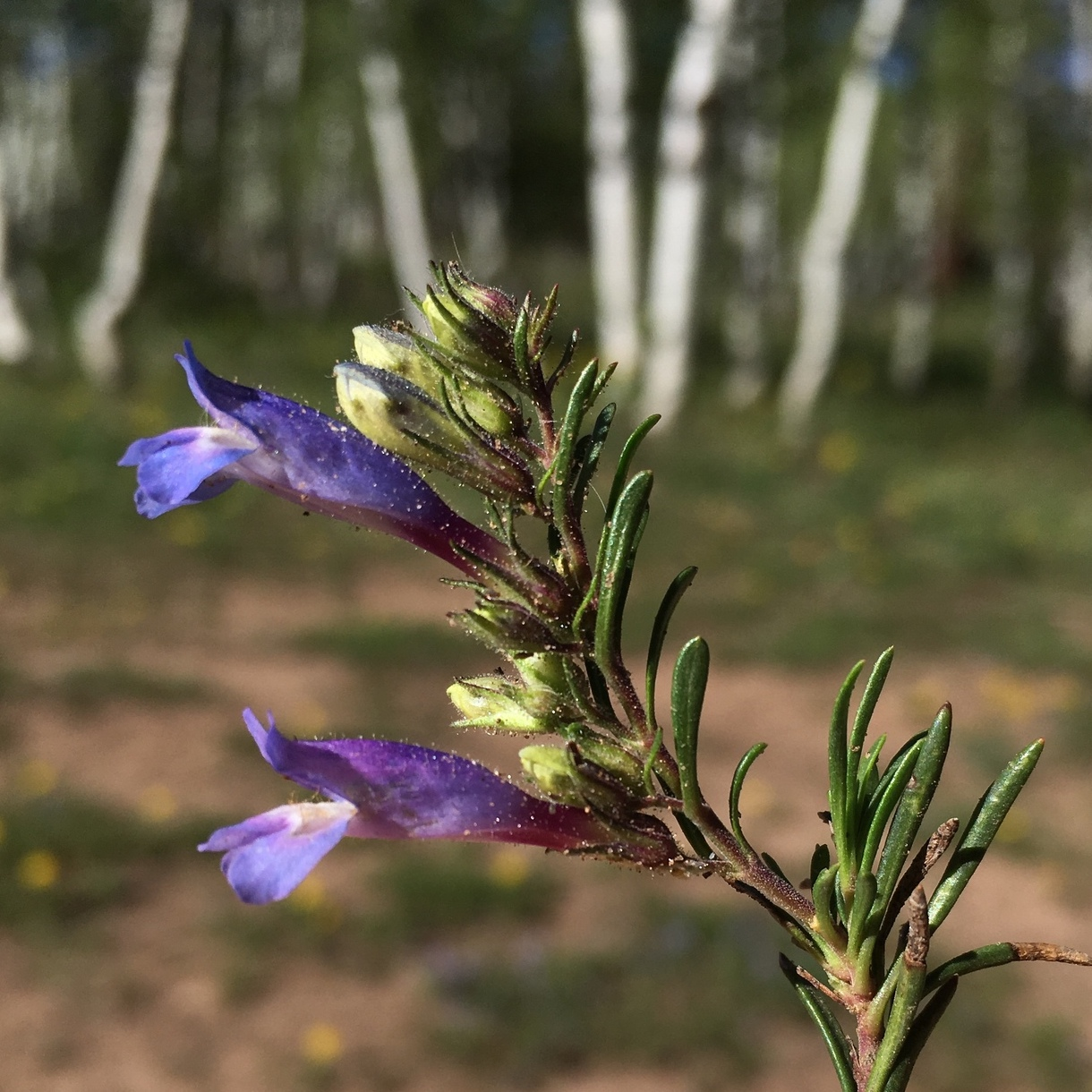
Isolated sprig with flowers showing structure

The inflorescences are secund, having all the flowers on one side of the stem. In addition to being retrorsely hairy, having the same backwards facing hairs as the rest of the stems, the inflorescences are usually sparsely covered in glandular hairs. The flowers are funnel shaped and 14 to 23 mm long. They range in color from blue to blue-purple or red-purple and are covered in glandular hairs.

=== Phytochemistry ===
The largest proportion of the iridoid glycoside in Penstemon crandallii is one named plantarenaloside. The species also does not have any aucubin or its derivatives, making it chemically distinct from Penstemon teucrioides. Three well known phenylethanoid glycosides are found in its leaves, verbascoside (acteoside), leucosceptoside, and echinacoside. Two chemicals derived from verbascoside were first described from it in 1995, 2-O-acetyl-3'"-O-methylverbascoside and 2,4"-di-O-acetyl-3'"-O-methylverbascoside.

== Taxonomy ==
Penstemon crandallii was scientifically described and named by Aven Nelson in 1899.

=== Varieties ===
There are five accepted varieties of Penstemon crandallii.

==== Penstemon crandallii var. atratus ====
This variety was initially describe as a subspecies by the penstemon expert David D. Keck in 1937. It was reclassified as a variety by Noel H. Holmgren in 1979. It grows in the La Sal Mountains in Grand County, Utah.

==== Penstemon crandallii var. crandallii ====
The autonymic variety of the species is only known from the states of Utah and Colorado. In Colorado it grows in the central mountains and western portions of the state. Towards the north central parts of the state it grows in Routt County and then south into the central mountains in Grand, Gilpin, Park, Teller, and Chaffee counties. To the west it grows from Garfield and Eagle counties in the north south through Mesa, Delta, Gunnison, and Montrose counties. In the southwest corner of the state it grows in Montezuma, Dolores, Archuleta, Ouray, and Hinsdale counties. Across the boarder it is only found in San Juan County, Utah.

==== Penstemon crandallii var. glabrescens ====
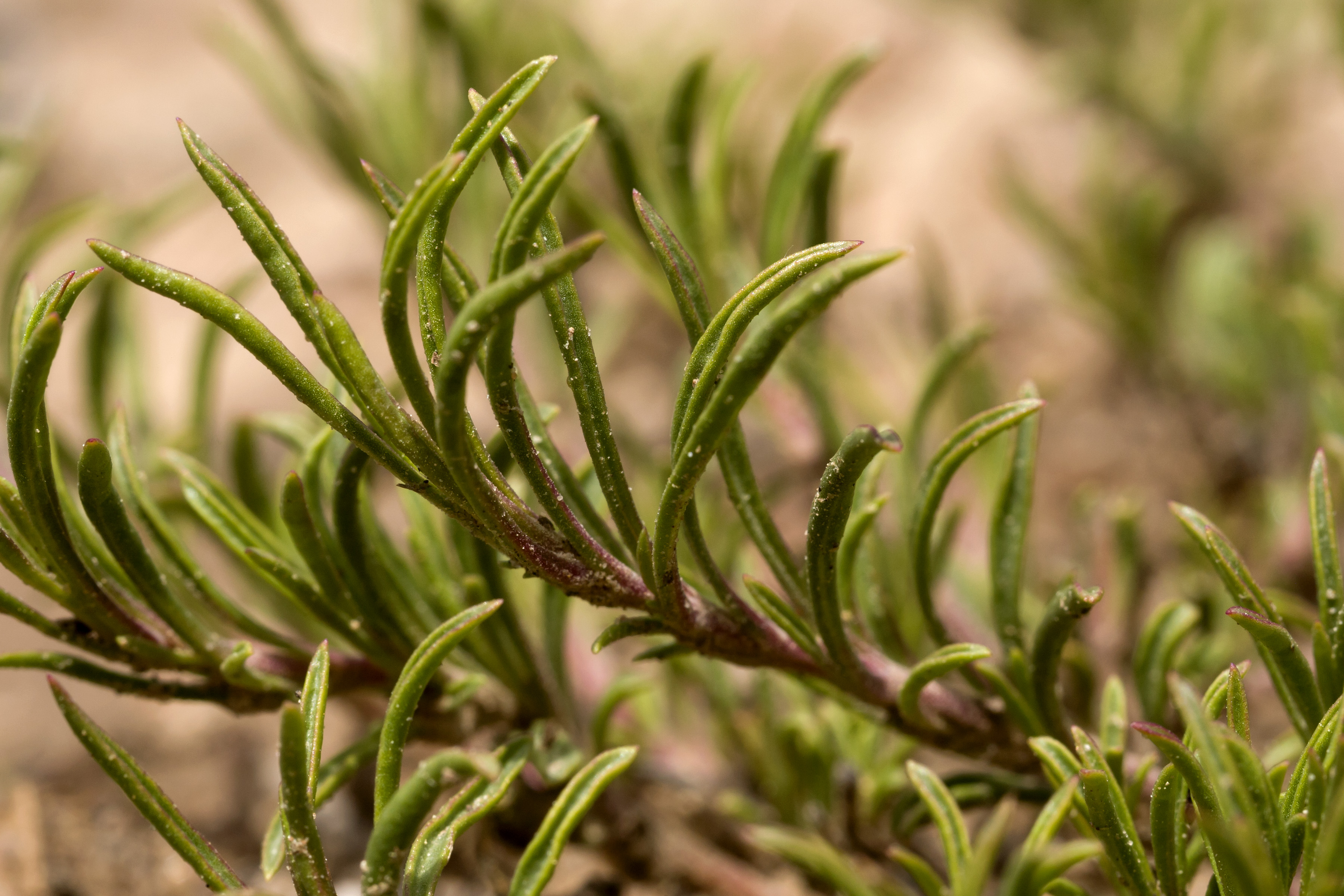
Leaves of P. crandallii var. glabrescens

The botanist Francis W. Pennell described a species in 1920 which he named Penstemon glabrescens. This was reevaluated as a variety by Craig Carl Freeman in 2017 after having been described as Penstemon coloradoensis var. glabrescens and as Penstemon crandallii subsp. glabrescens in 1937. Though accepted, it is only very slightly different than var. crandallii. It grows in two states with most of its documented range in Colorado and a smaller portion in New Mexico. In Colorado it grows as far north as Delta and Fremont counties and then south into Custer, Saguache, Mineral, Dolores, Conejos, Archuleta, La Plata, and Montezuma counties. It is only found in Rio Arriba and Taos counties in New Mexico.

==== Penstemon crandallii var. procumbens ====
This variety was described as Penstemon procumbens by the botanist Edward Lee Greene in 1901. It was described as a subspecies by Keck in 1937 and then as a variety in 2017 by Craig Freeman. It only grows in the state of Colorado and is definitely known only from Carbon Peak and Kebler Pass in the West Elk Mountains.

==== Penstemon crandallii var. ramaleyi ====
In 1937 Aven Nelson described a species which he named Penstemon ramaleyi. In 2017 this was also described as a variety by Freeman. It is only know from three Colorado counties in the southwest of the state, Hinsdale, Mineral, and Saguache. It is very much like var. glabrescens, but has long spreading hairs on the stems and very often on the leaves as well.

Between the species and its five varieties it has twelve synonyms, including four species names.

Table of Synonyms
Name	Year	Rank	Synonym of:	Notes
Penstemon coloradoensis var. glabrescens (Pennell) A.Nelson	1937	variety	var. glabrescens	≡ hom.
Penstemon crandallii subsp. atratus D.D.Keck	1937	subspecies	var. atratus	≡ hom.
Penstemon crandallii subsp. glabrescens (Pennell) D.D.Keck	1937	subspecies	var. glabrescens	≡ hom.
Penstemon crandallii subsp. procumbens (Greene) D.D.Keck	1937	subspecies	var. procumbens	≡ hom.
Penstemon crandallii subsp. taosensis (D.D.Keck) J.T.Kartesz & Gandhi	1992	subspecies	var. glabrescens	= het.
Penstemon crandallii var. taosensis (D.D.Keck) G.T.Nisbet & R.C.Jacks.	1960	variety	var. glabrescens	= het.
Penstemon crandallii subsp. typicus D.D.Keck	1937	subspecies	P. crandallii	≡ hom., not validly publ.
Penstemon glabrescens Pennell	1920	species	var. glabrescens	≡ hom.
Penstemon linarioides subsp. taosensis D.D.Keck	1937	subspecies	var. glabrescens	= het.
Penstemon procumbens Greene	1901	species	var. procumbens	≡ hom.
Penstemon ramaleyi A.Nelson	1937	species	var. ramaleyi	≡ hom.
Penstemon suffrutescens Rydb.	1901	species	var. crandallii	= het.
Notes: ≡ homotypic synonym ; = heterotypic synonym

=== Names ===
The species name of crandallii was selected to honor Charles Spencer Crandall, a professor at what eventually became Colorado State University. Similarly, in English it is known by the common name Crandall's penstemon.

== Range and habitat ==
The range of Penstemon crandallii extends over much of western Colorado into portions of New Mexico and Utah. In Colorado it grows as far north as Routt County and south through the central mountains and west. The native range in Utah is just two eastern counties, Grand County and San Juan County. Likewise it grows in just Rio Arriba and Taos counties in New Mexico. The variety glabrescens has the widest elevation range, from 1700 to as high as 3400 meters.

It is associated with sagebrush steppe, rocky scree, pinyon–juniper woodlands, ponderosa pine forests, and with scrub oak.

=== Conservation ===
In 1992 NatureServe evaluated Penstemon crandallii and rated it as apparently secure (G4). It did not rate the species at the state level.

== Cultivation ==
The penstemon cultivar 'Blue Lips' was created by crossing Penstemon crandallii with Penstemon linariodes var. coloradensis.

== See also ==
- List of Penstemon species
