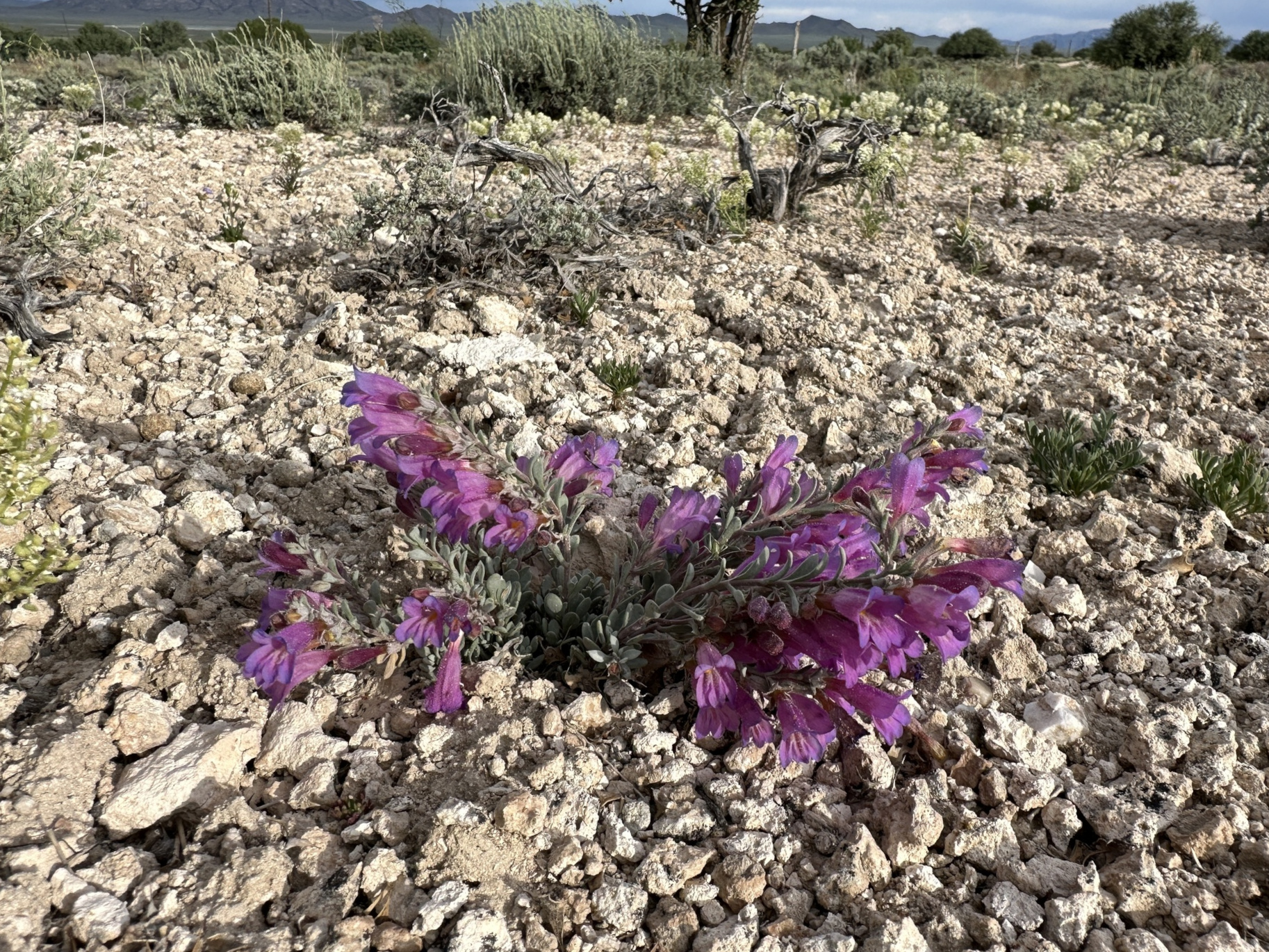
- Penstemon thompsoniae blooming in Wayne E. Kirch Wildlife Management Area, Nevada

Conservation status
- Apparently Secure (NatureServe)

Scientific classification
- Kingdom: Plantae
- Clade: Tracheophytes
- Clade: Angiosperms
- Clade: Eudicots
- Clade: Asterids
- Order: Lamiales
- Family: Plantaginaceae
- Genus: Penstemon
- Species: P. thompsoniae

Binomial name
- Penstemon thompsoniae (A.Gray) Rydb.

= Penstemon thompsoniae =

Species of shrub

Penstemon thompsoniae, Thompson's beardtongue, is a low perennial plant endemic to the southwestern United States, where it grows in dry shrublands, woodlands and forests. It is considered a species of conservation concern in California.

== Taxonomy ==
Penstemon thompsoniae originally was considered a variety of Penstemon pumilis, as published by Asa Gray in 1878. It was later reclassified as Penstemon caespitosus var. thompsoniae by Aven Nelson, and then elevated to full species by Per Axel Rydberg.

In 1937, David D. Keck recognized two subspecies of Penstemon thompsoniae: ssp. jaegeri, restricted to mountains of Clark County, Nevada, which he distinguished by its few, remote stems and open inflorescence, and ssp. thompsoniae in Arizona, Nevada, and Utah, which he distinguished by its tufted stems and compact inflorescences. These subspecies are no longer recognized due to the morphologic continuum that exists between them.

== Description ==
Penstemon thompsoniae is a mat-forming perennial herb or subshrub, less than 15 cm high, with a woody base. It is ashy gray-green with a thick coating of hairs. The leaves are oval or spoon-shaped, to 2 cm long. The short inflorescence bears wide-mouthed tubular purple flowers to 2 cm long, glandular hairy on the outer surface, and somewhat hairy on the inner. The tip of the staminode is covered in yellow to orange hairs.

== Distribution ==
Penstemon thompsoniae is endemic to the southwestern United States, occurring in Nevada, southwest Utah, Arizona and southeastern California. Habitat includes sandy to gravelly soils, sagebrush shrublands, pine-juniper woodlands and pine forests, at 1500–3400 m elevation. It typically blooms May–Aug.

The limited range of Penstemon thompsoniae in California has made it of state conservation concern.

== History ==
Penstemon thompsoniae was first collected by Ellen Powell Thompson in 1872 in the vicinity of Kanab, Utah, during the US Topographical and Geological Survey of the Colorado River (led by John Wesley Powell). Her specimen, the holotype, is deposited at the Gray Herbarium.

== Cultivation ==
Although it is sometimes grown in rock gardens, Penstemon thompsoniae is more sensitive to moisture than Penstemon caespitosus and outside its native habitat it is better in specialized cultivation situations like an Alpine house.
