= NOAAS Davidson =

NOAA survey ship

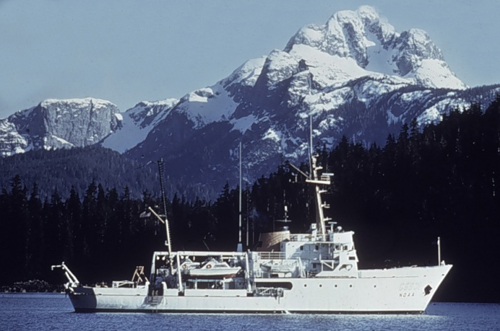
- NOAAS Davidson (S 331)

History

United States
- Name: USC&GS Davidson (CSS 31)
- Namesake: George Davidson (1825-1911), an accomplished geodesist and United States Coast Survey official
- Operator: U.S. Coast and Geodetic Survey
- Builder: Norfolk Shipbuilding and Drydock Company, Norfolk, Virginia
- Launched: 7 May 1966
- Sponsored by: Mrs. George P. Miller
- Commissioned: 10 March 1967
- Fate: Transferred to National Oceanic and Atmospheric Administration 3 October 1970

United States
- Name: NOAAS Davidson (S 331)
- Namesake: Previous name retained
- Operator: National Oceanic and Atmospheric Administration
- Acquired: Transferred from U.S. Coast and Geodetic Survey 3 October 1970
- Out of service: 1989
- Stricken: 1997
- Home port: Seattle, Washington
- Identification: IMO number: 6613914; MMSI number: 657262000; Callsign: WTEK (Whiskey Tango Echo Kilo)
- Fate: Sold; Became private American research vessel; Later became a Nigerian oilfield security vessel
- Status: Active as oilfield security vessel in Nigeria

General characteristics
- Class & type: McArthur-class hydrographic survey ship
- Tonnage: 854 gross register tons; 207 net register tons
- Displacement: 995 tons (full load)
- Length: 175 ft (53 m)
- Beam: 38 ft (12 m)
- Draft: 12.1 ft (3.7 m)
- Installed power: 1,600 horsepower (2.1 megawatts)
- Propulsion: Two General Motors diesel engines, twin controllable-pitch propellers, 186 tons fuel
- Speed: 12 knots (22 km/h; 14 mph)
- Range: 6,000 nautical miles (11,000 km; 6,900 mi) at 12 knots (22 km/h; 14 mph)
- Endurance: 17 days
- Complement: Either 23 (6 officers and 17 crew) plus up to 13 scientists or 38 (8 NOAA Corps officers, 3 licensed engineers, and 27 other crew, plus up to 2 scientists
- Notes: 440 kilowatts electrical power; Hydroplot data-recording system

NOAAS Davidson (S 331) was a survey ship in commission in the National Oceanic and Atmospheric Administration (NOAA) from 1970 to 1989. Prior to her NOAA service, she was in commission in the United States Coast and Geodetic Survey from 1967 to 1970 as USC&GS Davidson (CSS 31), the second Coast and Geodetic Survey ship of the name. She was the only sister ship of NOAAS McArthur (S 330).

== Construction and commissioning ==
Davidson was built for the U.S. Coast and Geodetic Survey as a "coastal survey ship" (CSS) and was launched by the Norfolk Shipbuilding and Drydock Company at Norfolk, Virginia, on 7 May 1966, sponsored by Mrs. George P. Miller. The Coast and Geodetic Survey commissioned her on 10 March 1967 as USC&GS Davidson (CSS 31), the second Coast and Geodetic Survey ship to bear the name. When the Coast and Geodetic Survey merged with other agencies to form NOAA on 3 October 1970, she became part of the NOAA fleet as NOAAS Davidson (S 331).

== Operations ==
With her home port at the Pacific Marine Center, Seattle, Washington, Davidson, along with her only sister ship, McArthur, spent her career conducting hydrographic surveys along the United States West Coast; in Alaskan waters, including in Prince William Sound in 1974, Tracy Arm, Endicott Arm, and Skagway Harbor; in San Diego Bay in 1975; and in the Pacific Ocean. She had a Bathymetric Swath Survey System (a stabilized deep-mapping sonar) and a Hydroplot data-recording system.

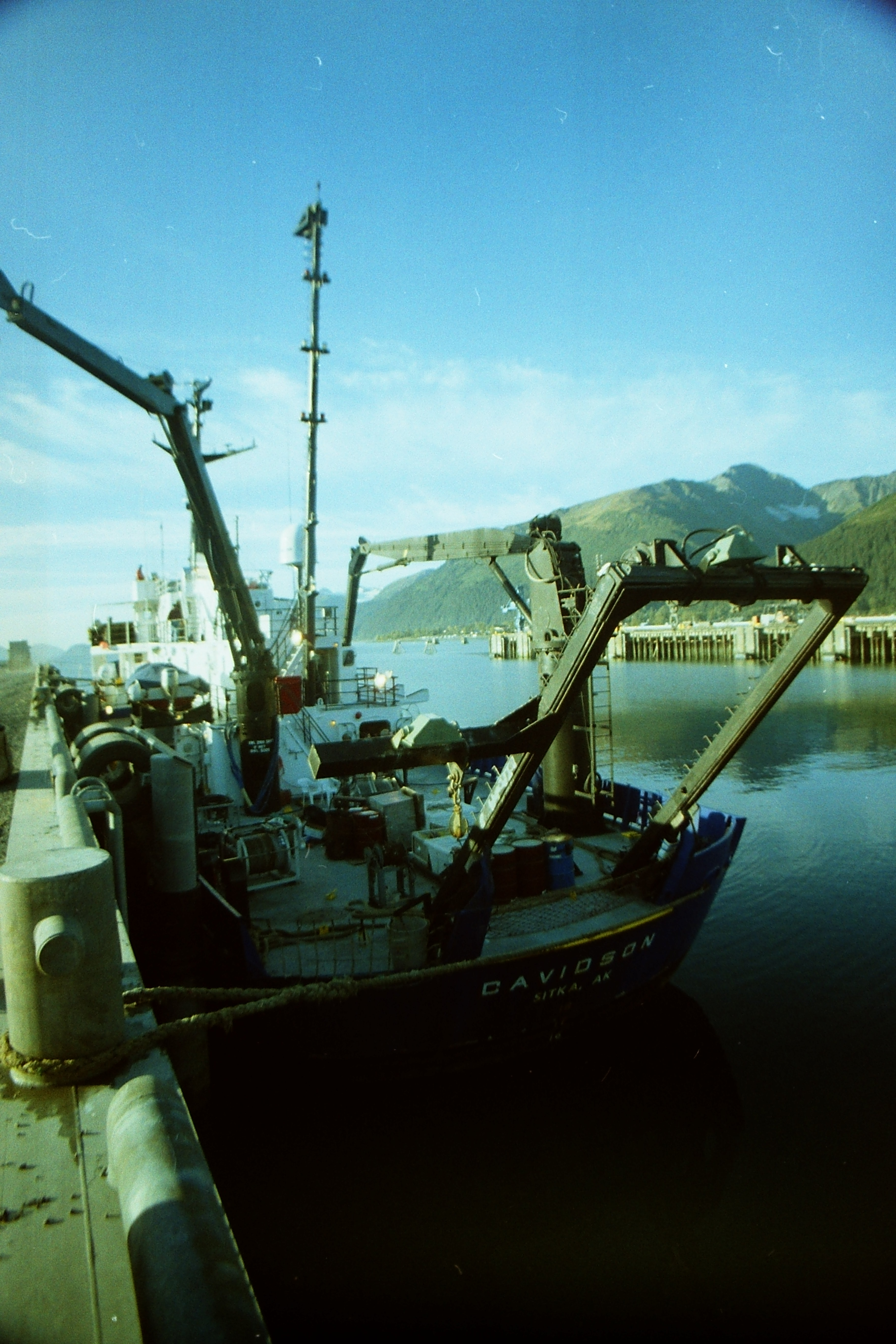
R/V Davidson in Seward, Alaska in Ocean Services colors

Taken out of service in 1989, Davidson was stricken in 1997 without ever having been formally decommissioned. After her disposal by NOAA, Davidson was operated for many years by Ocean Services Inc. a company in Seattle and with her home port in Sitka, Alaska. She was used as a survey and research vessel in the Gulf of Mexico, the Caribbean, South America, Alaska, and various locations in the Pacific. In 2002 from Feb 28th through May 11 she was chartered by Nauticos to search for Amelia Earhart's Lockheed 10E Electra. She was eventually sold to interests in Nigeria and operates there as a security vessel in the Nigerian offshore oilfields.

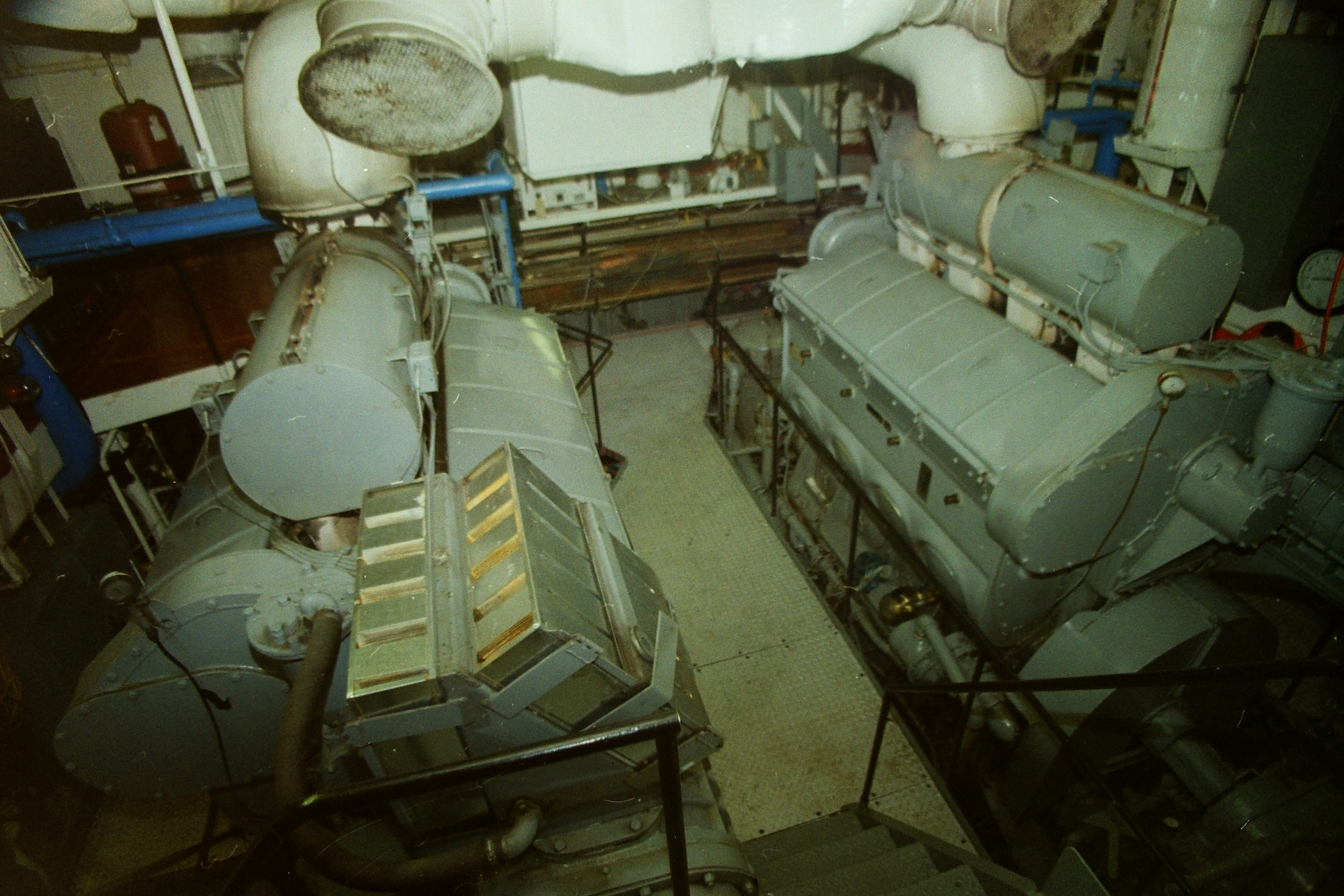
R/V Davidson engineroom
