= USC&GS Davidson (1925) =

History

United States
- Name: Davidson
- Namesake: George Davidson (1825-1911), an accomplished geodesist and United States Coast Survey official
- Builder: Luders
- Completed: 1925
- Acquired: 1933 (from U.S. Coast Guard)
- Commissioned: 1933
- Decommissioned: 1935
- Fate: Returned to U.S. Coast Guard 1935

General characteristics
- Type: Launch
- Length: 75 ft (23 m)
- Beam: 13.6 ft (4.1 m)
- Draft: 4 ft (1.2 m)
- Propulsion: Twin gasoline engines

The first USC&GS Davidson was a launch in service with the United States Coast and Geodetic Survey from 1933 to 1935.

Davidson was built by Luders in Stamford, Connecticut in 1925 for the United States Coast Guard. The Coast and Geodetic Survey acquired her in 1933, named her Davidson, and placed her in service that year. The Survey returned her to the Coast Guard in 1935.
