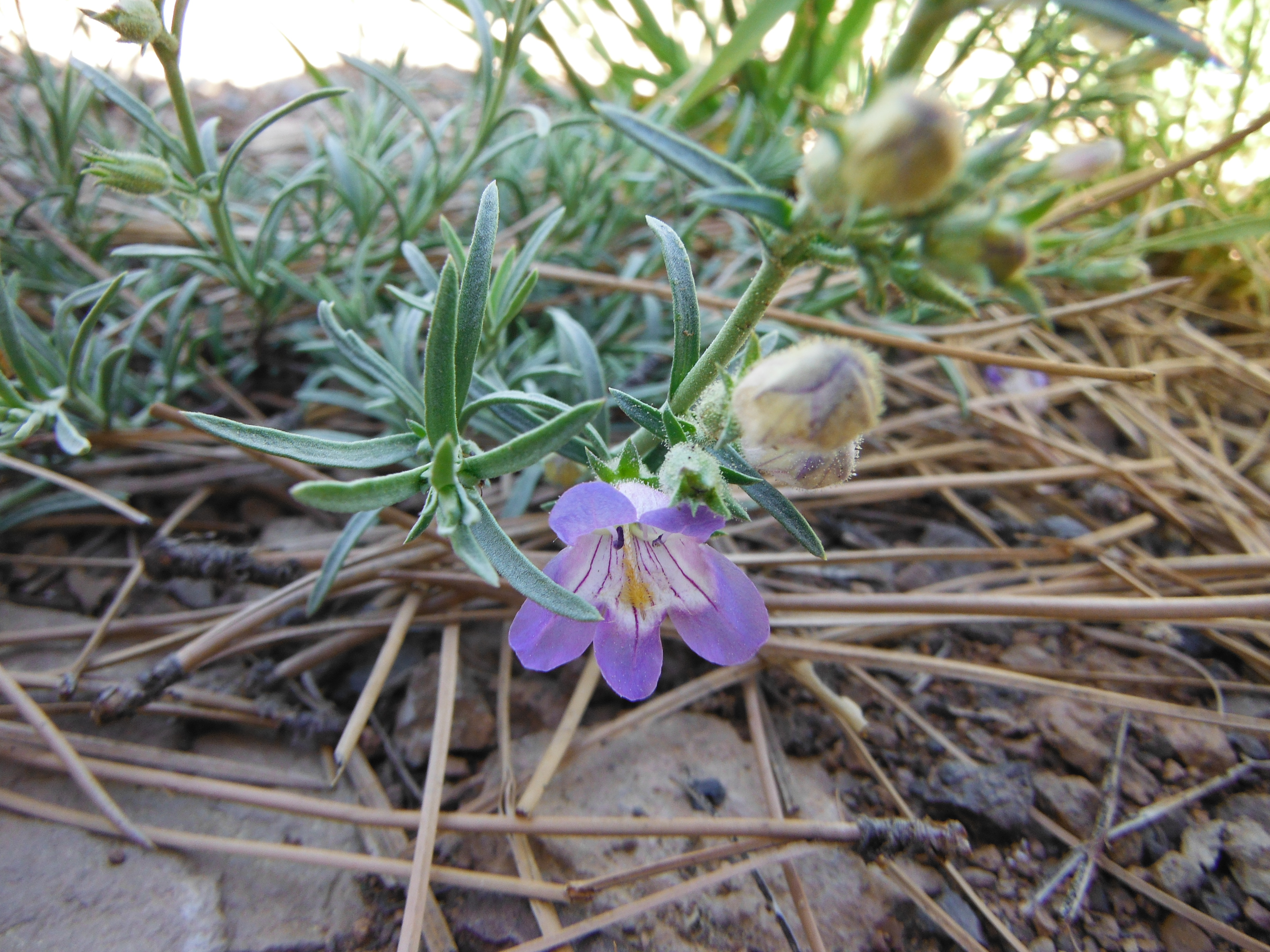

Conservation status
- Secure (NatureServe)

Scientific classification
- Kingdom: Plantae
- Clade: Tracheophytes
- Clade: Angiosperms
- Clade: Eudicots
- Clade: Asterids
- Order: Lamiales
- Family: Plantaginaceae
- Genus: Penstemon
- Species: P. linarioides

Binomial name
- Penstemon linarioides A.Gray

Varieties
- P. l. var. coloradoensis; P. l. var. linarioides; P. l. var. maguirei; P. l. var. sileri

Synonyms
- Penstemon coloradoensis

= Penstemon linarioides =

Plant species in the veronica family

Penstemon linarioides is a plant species in the genus Penstemon. Its common names include toadflax penstemon, toadflax beardtongue and Colorado narrowleaf beardtongue. It grows in Nevada, Arizona, Utah, Colorado, and New Mexico.

== Taxonomy ==
Penstemon linarioides was scientifically described in 1859 by Asa Gray. He placed the species in the genus Penstemon which is part of the Plantaginaceae family. It has four accepted varieties.

- Penstemon linarioides var. coloradoensis – Arizona, Colorado, and New Mexico
- Penstemon linarioides var. linarioides – Baja California, Arizona, New Mexico, and Sonora
- Penstemon linarioides var. maguirei – Arizona and New Mexico
- Penstemon linarioides var. sileri – Arizona, Nevada, and Utah

It has eight synonyms of the species or one of its four varieties.

Table of Synonyms
Name	Year	Rank	Synonym of:	Notes
Penstemon coloradoensis A.Nelson	1899	species	var. coloradoensis	≡ hom.
Penstemon coloradoensis subsp. sileri Pennell	1920	subspecies	var. coloradoensis	= het.
Penstemon linarioides subsp. coloradoensis (A.Nelson) D.D.Keck	1937	subspecies	var. coloradoensis	≡ hom.
Penstemon linarioides subsp. compactifolius D.D.Keck	1937	subspecies	var. linarioides	= het.
Penstemon linarioides subsp. maguirei D.D.Keck	1937	subspecies	var. maguirei	≡ hom.
Penstemon linarioides subsp. sileri (A.Gray) D.D.Keck	1937	subspecies	var. sileri	≡ hom.
Penstemon linarioides subsp. typicus D.D.Keck	1937	subspecies	P. linarioides	≡ hom., not validly publ.
Penstemon linarioides var. viridis D.D.Keck	1937	variety	var. sileri	= het.
Notes: ≡ homotypic synonym; = heterotypic synonym

=== Names ===
The species name, linarioides, means 'like toadflax' in Botanical Latin due to the similar leaf shape to some species in the genus Linaria. Penstemon linarioides is known by the common names toadflax penstemon, linarialeaf penstemon, and narrowleaf penstemon. It is also known as Colorado toadflax beardtongue and toadflax beardtongue. It is sometimes called mat penstemon, however Penstemon caespitosus is more typically known by this name.

== See also ==
- List of Penstemon species
