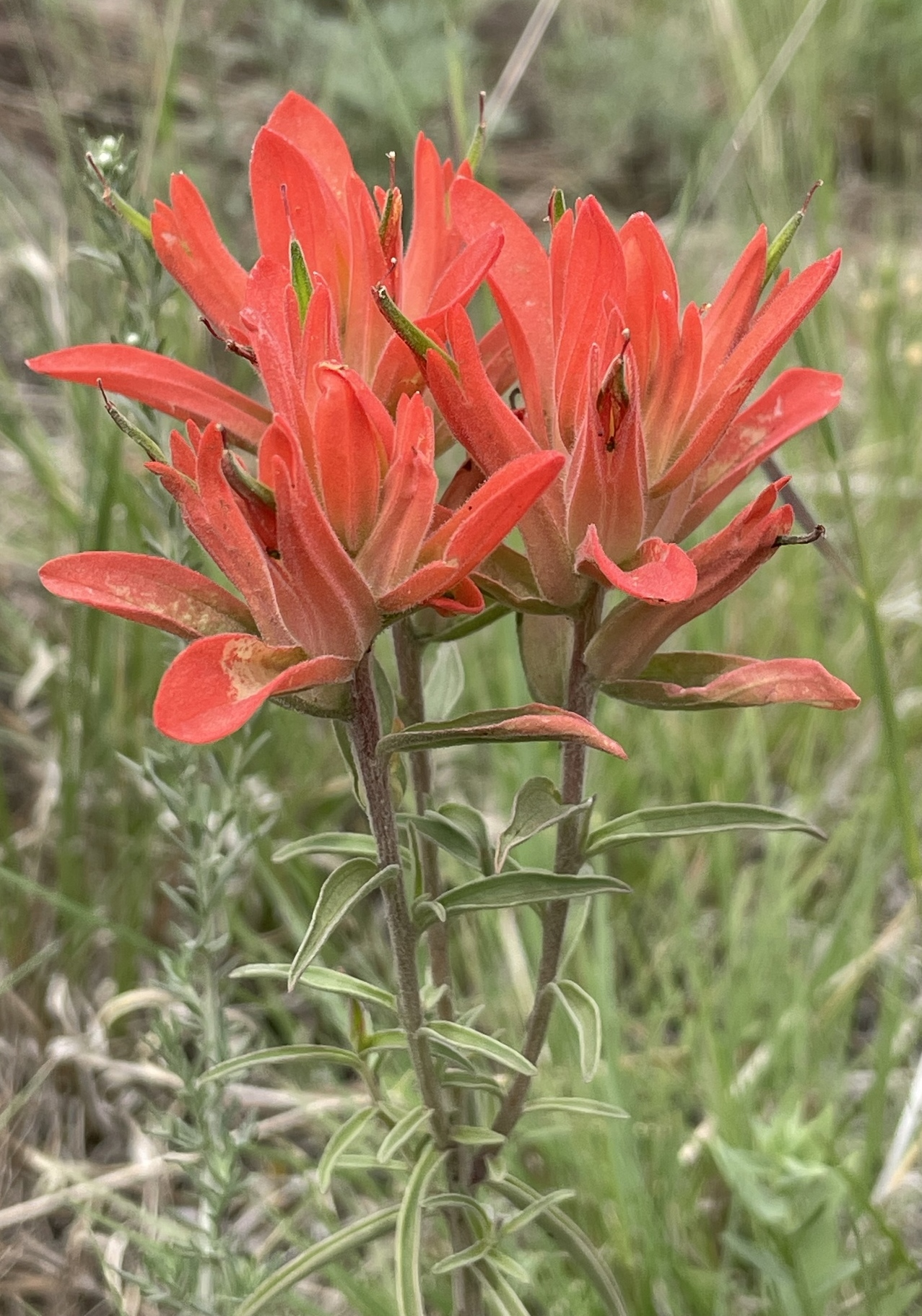
- Coconino National Forest, Arizona, US

Conservation status
- Apparently Secure (NatureServe)

Scientific classification
- Kingdom: Plantae
- Clade: Tracheophytes
- Clade: Angiosperms
- Clade: Eudicots
- Clade: Asterids
- Order: Lamiales
- Family: Orobanchaceae
- Genus: Castilleja
- Species: C. integra

Binomial name
- Castilleja integra A.Gray
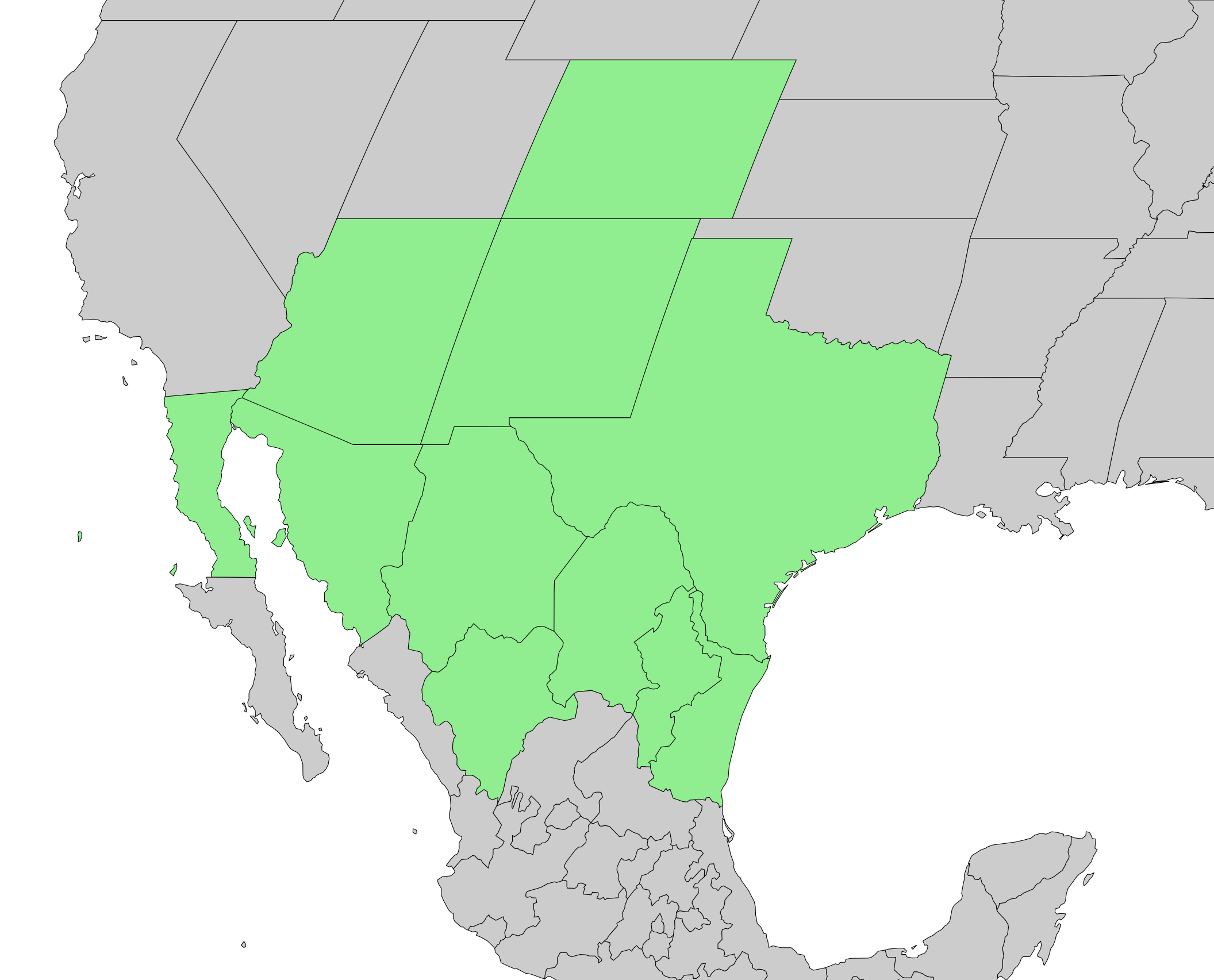
- The range of Castilleja integra in western North America

Synonyms
- Castilleja angustifolia A.Gray; Castilleja elongata Pennell; Castilleja gloriosa Britton

= Castilleja integra =

Species of flowering plant

Castilleja integra, with the common names orange paintbrush, Southwestern paintbrush, and wholeleaf paintbrush, is a partially parasitic herbaceous perennial plant native to the Southwestern United States and Northern Mexico. The species produces a relatively large amount of nectar and is attractive to hummingbirds. It is better suited to cultivation than most other species in the paintbrush genus (Castilleja) and is therefore used in xeriscape gardens and naturalistic meadows, even outside its native range.

== Description ==
Mature individuals of Castilleja integra are typically 9–50 centimeters (3.5–20 in) in size, though they have been reported to grow as tall as 100 centimeters (39 in). All above ground parts of the plants, the leaves, bracts, stems, and flowers, are covered in light coating of soft down, called tomentum by botanists. The herbaceous stems regrow each season from a hard, woody structure called a caudex that is atop a substantial taproot or stout branched roots. The stems either grow straight up from the ground (erect stems) or have a curved bend at their base to grow outwards a short distance then upwards (ascending stems). C. integra may have just one solitary stem or several, they are always unbranched near the base, but may have short branches near the end of the stems.

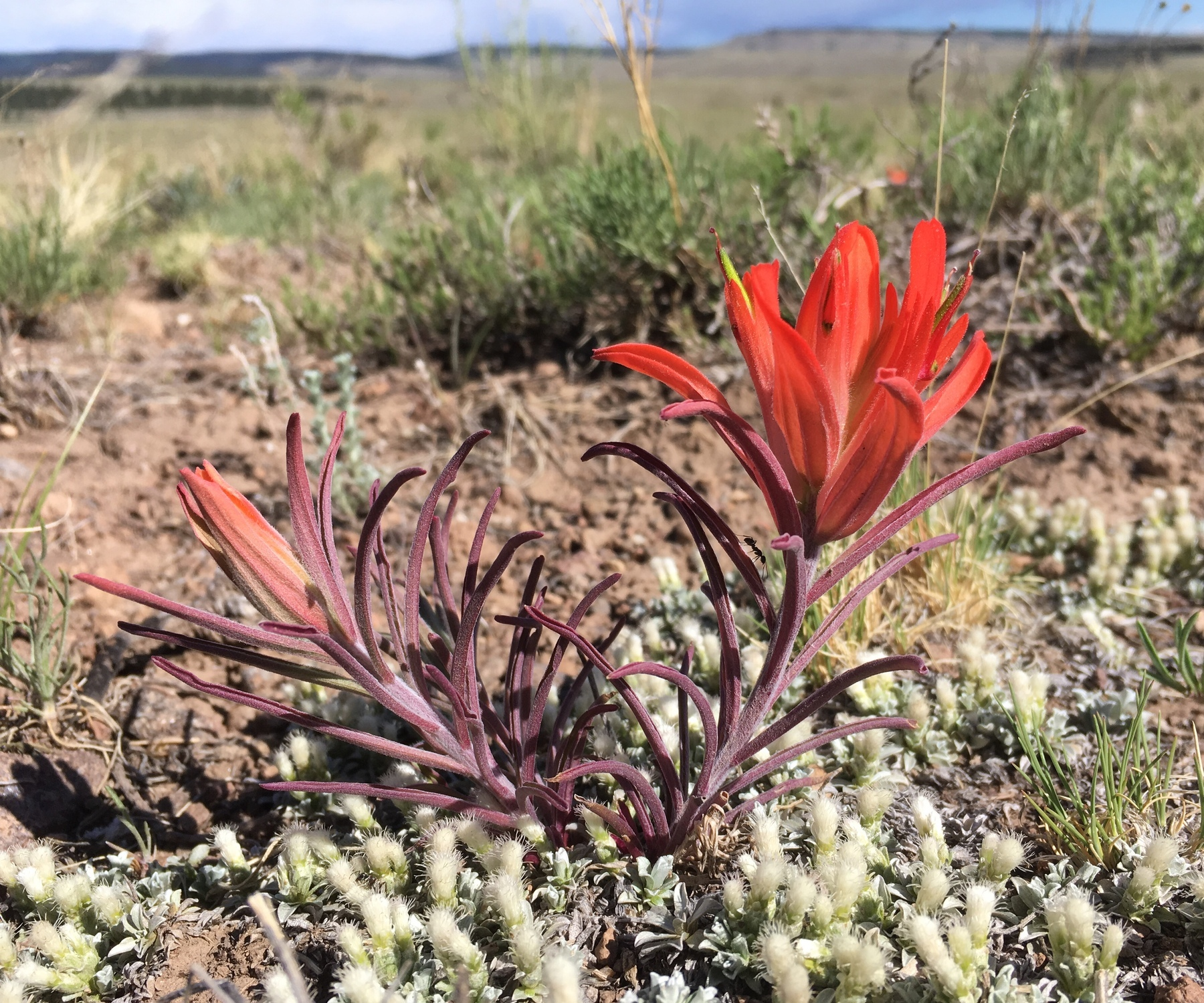
Castilleja integra with purple leaves near Carson National Forest, Rio Arriba County, New Mexico

Castilleja integra has leaves that may range in color from purplish to fully green, but will usually be pale or dusty looking because of the fine, unbranched hairs on the surface. The leaves are always narrow, but vary from being very narrow and thin like a blade of grass (linear leaves) to being almost rectangular, but still not very wide (narrowly oblong leaves). The leaves are usually whole without divisions or toothed edges (entire), but will occasionally have two shallow divisions near the end of the leaf, giving it three lobes. The edges of the leaves can be wavy, but are never thick or fleshy. Often the edges roll inward towards the center of the leaf (involute). The end of the leaves have a narrow point or slightly rounded tip. The length of the leaves can be 1–9 centimeters (0.39–3.5 in), but usually between 2–7 centimeters (0.79–2.8 in).

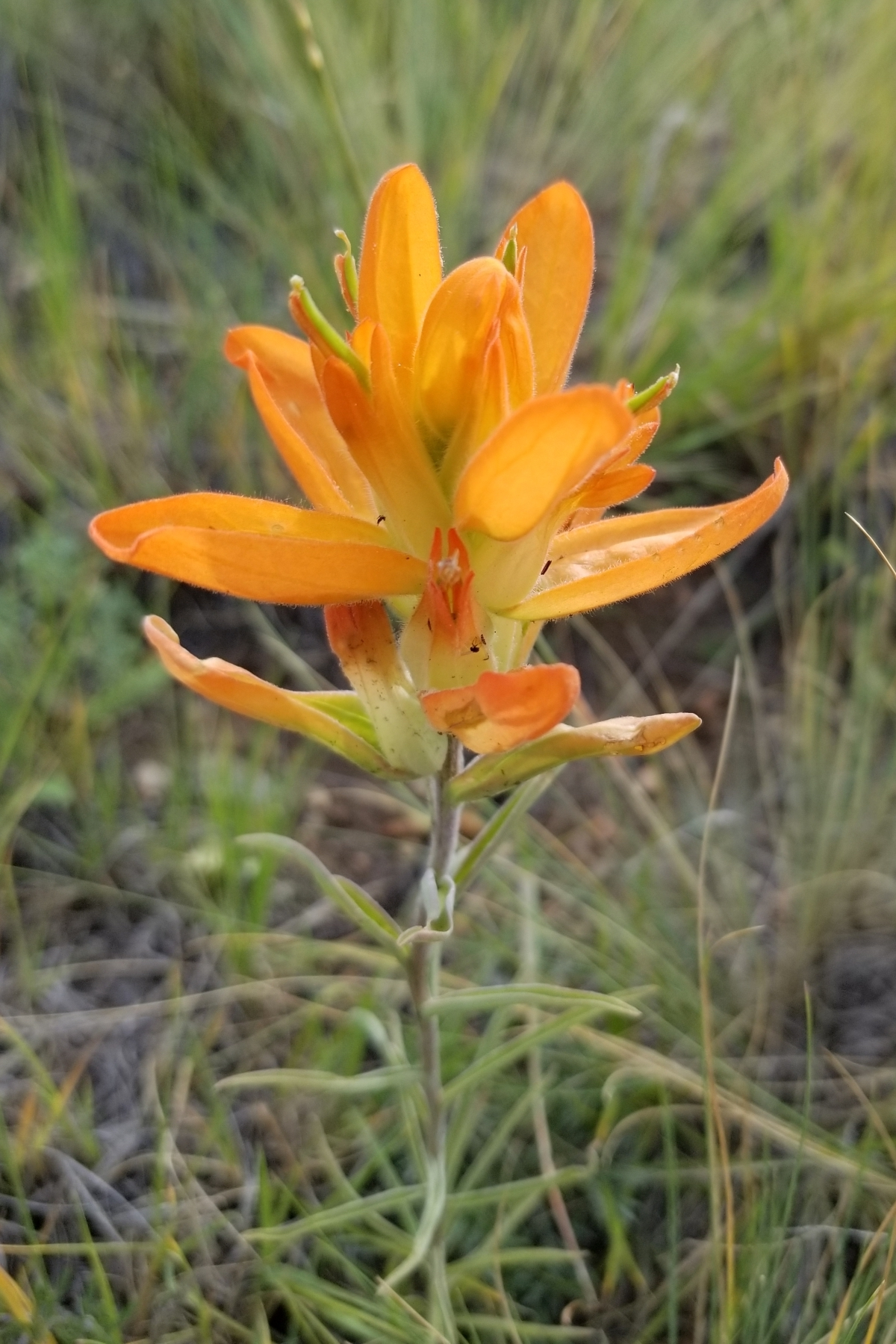
Castilleja integra flower, lighter color form, Lost Creek Wilderness, Park County, Colorado

The cluster of flowers and the surrounding bracts (the inflorescence) can be 2 to 15 centimeters long, though usually less than 10 centimeters. The width is 1.5–4 centimeters (0.59–1.6 in). The showy bracts are variable in color with occasional instances of rose, crimson, cerise, pale salmon, or pale yellow individuals, but most often an intense red-orange or orange flame color. Very often they are the same color on the whole of the bract, but sometimes they are green or a pale straw color at the base. The bracts may be shaped like a skinny spear point (lanceolate), oblong like the leaves, egg shaped (obovate), or intermediate between any of these shapes. The ends of the bracts can be undivided or have three or (rarely) five lobes. The middle or lone end of the bract is always blunt while when side lobes are present their ends are narrow (acute). The total length of the bracts is 20 to 40 millimeters.

The sepals (calyx) have the same color and texture as the bracts and may be 18–38 millimeters long, but are more often between 21 and 35 millimeters in length. The sepals are united into a tube for most of their length with splits towards the end. The splits on the top and bottom are 25–35% of the length, as much as 6–18 millimeters long, but more often 9–16 millimeters in length. The splits towards the sides are shorter, 10–15% of the tube's length. The lobes formed by the splits are lanceolate or triangular in shape with a rounded or narrow point.

Castilleja integra has true petals that are fused into a tube for much of their length. The overall length of the petals is usually 25–45 millimeters, but may be as little as 21 mm or as much as 50 mm in exceptional cases. The length of the tube portion of the flower petals is 17–33 millimeters. The beak, the pointed end of the flower petals, is green in color on the upper surface and either only slightly shorter than the sepals to projecting well beyond them. The beak ranges in size from 8–18 millimeters, but is most often in the range of 10–17 millimeters. The lower lip is always dark green and 20% as long as the beak.

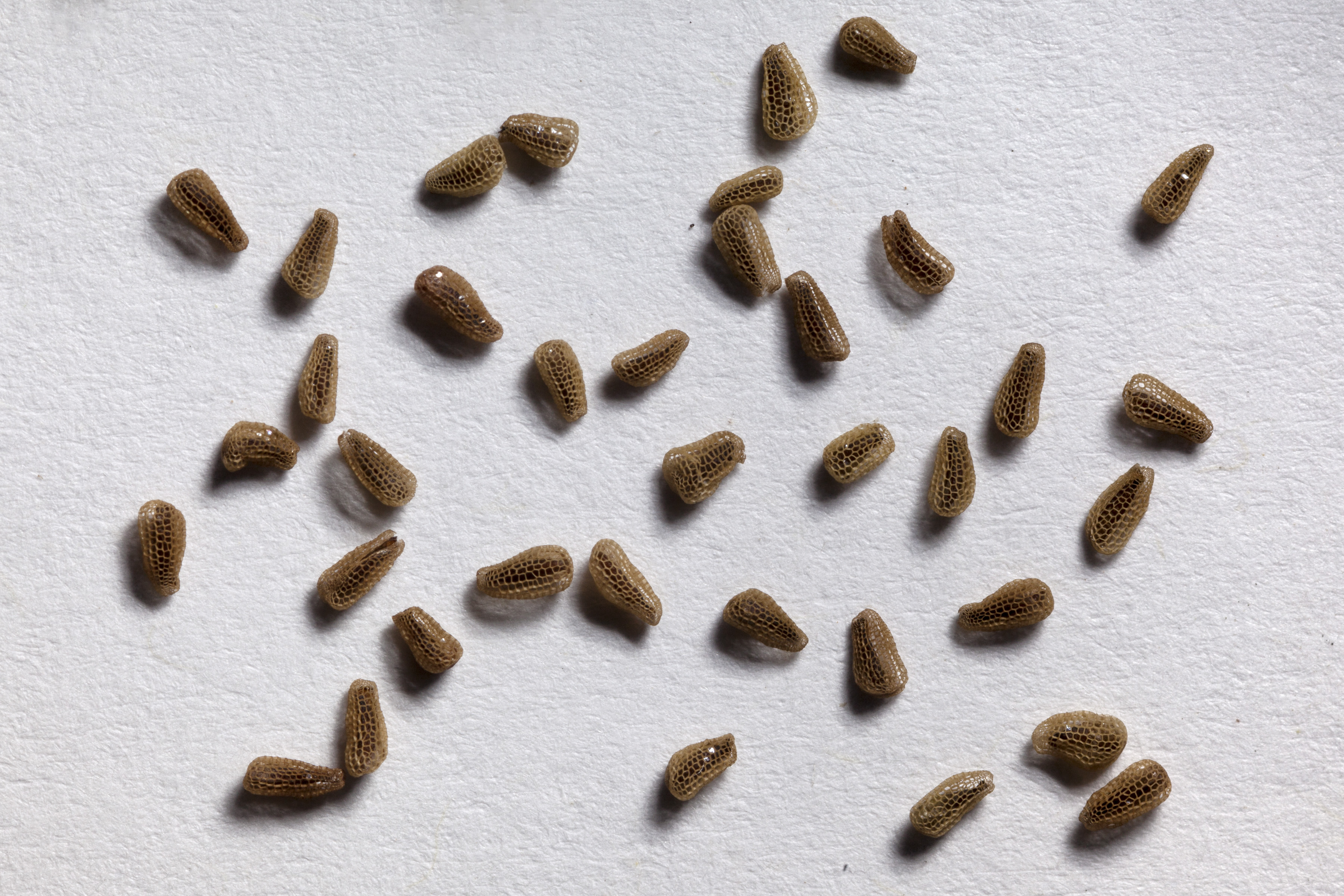
Castilleja integra seeds

The flowering season is very extended due to the wide range of elevations where the flowers are found, most often in March to October, but occasionally as early as January. In Colorado the blooming season starts in June and continues through August. The seeds are contained within a capsule 12–16 millimeters long.

Similar species that it may be confused with include Castilleja lanata and Castilleja miniata. The combination of undivided leaves that strongly roll inward (involute), the soft unbranched downy hairs, and usually undivided bracts help to distinguish Castilleja integra from its relatives.

=== Chemistry ===
Castilleja integra plants contain iridoids bound as glycosides at different concentrations in different parts of the plant. Macfadienoside is found in all parts of the plants, but at especially high levels in the leaves. Similarly, methyl shanziside is much more common in leaves and found at very low levels in bracts or flowers. On the other hand, catalpol is mainly or only found in the flowers. These differences influence what parts of the plants are consumed by herbivores.

Castilleja integra will also transfer certain alkaloids from host plants to its own tissues. For example senecionine, a pyrrolizidine alkaloid, is transferred from Liatris punctata (dotted gayfeathers) and Senecio species to itself. Similarly lupanine, one of the quinolizidine alkaloids, is transferred from Lupinus (lupins). The transfer of senecionine to itself appears to have some benefit in reducing the growth rate of herbivores such as leanira checkerspot caterpillars (Chlosyne leanira). In other cases, like that of Oxytropis sericea, C. integra will parasitize the host plant, but does not transfer the alkaloid swainsonine to itself.

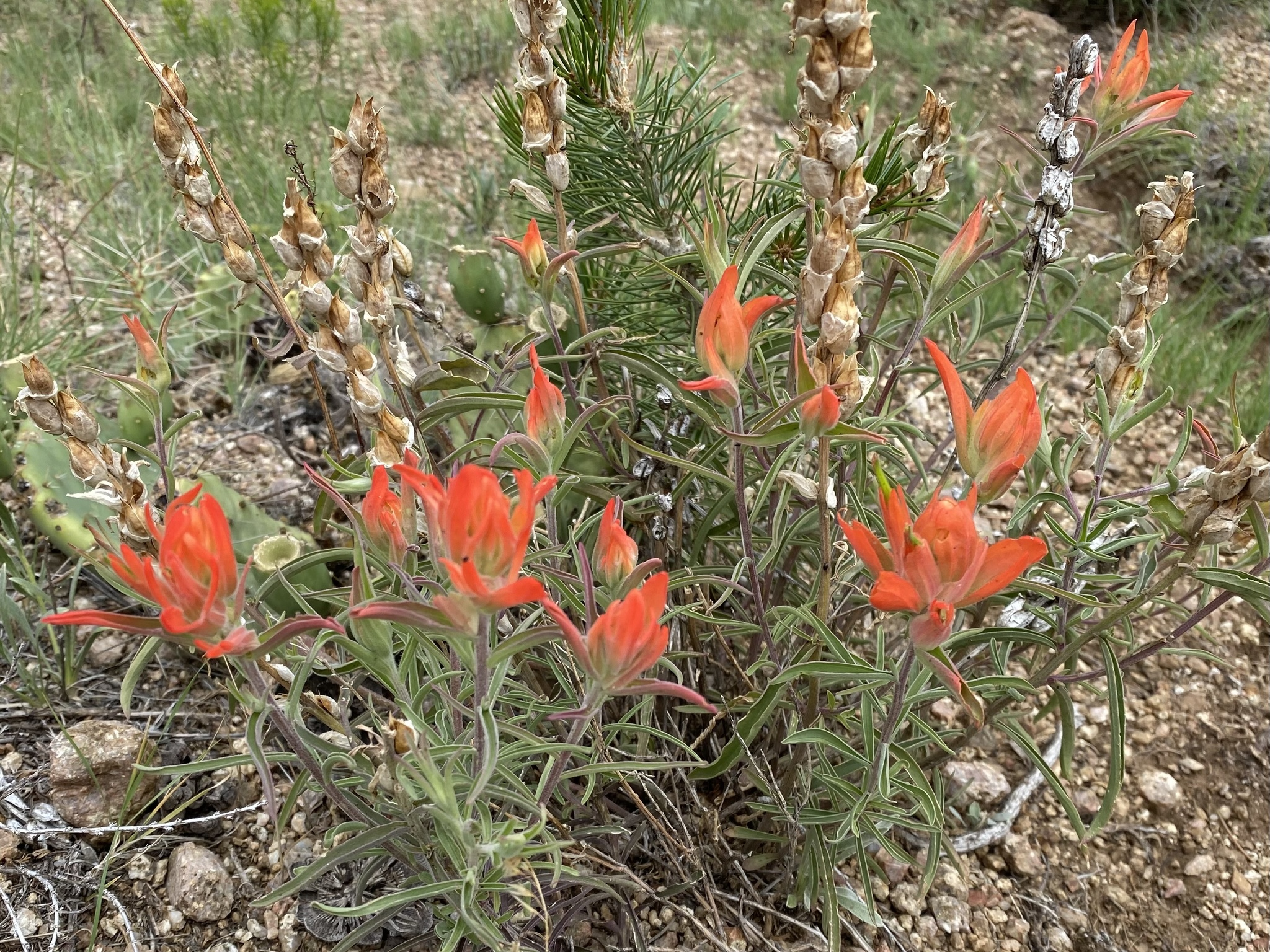
Castilleja integra seed capsules, Sandia Mountain Wilderness, New Mexico

== Taxonomy ==
Castilleja integra was first scientifically observed in the Organ Mountains of Southern New Mexico near El Paso, Texas, by Charles Wright. Its first published description was in 1858 by Asa Gray. Two different chromosome numbers have been observed in Castilleja integra, 2n = 24 and 48.

Though its naming and classification have never been challenged, a number species or subspecies have previously been described that are now either regarded as illegitimate (nomen illegitimum) or as synonyms of Castilleja integra. These include Castilleja angustifolia described by Asa Gray in 1859, the mistaken Castilleja elongata described by Francis W. Pennell in 1941, and Castilleja gloriosa described by James Britten in 1889. Theodore Dru Alison Cockerell recognized that the description of Castilleja gloriosa was incorrect, but thought it may be a subspecies and described it as Castilleja integra var. gloriosa in 1900 along with another subspecies Castilleja integra var. intermedia. He had previously described another subspecies as Castilleja integra var. gracilis in 1890.

As of 2023 Plants of the World Online (POWO), World Flora Online (WFO), and Flora of North America list Castilleja integra as the correct classification and Castilleja gloriosa as a synonym. It has six heterotypic synonyms in total.

Table of Synonyms
Name	Year	Rank	Notes
Castilleja angustifolia A.Gray	1859	species	nom. illeg.
Castilleja elongata Pennell	1941	species	
Castilleja gloriosa Britton	1889	species	
Castilleja integra var. gloriosa (Britton) Cockerell	1900	variety	
Castilleja integra var. gracilis Cockerell	1890	variety	
Castilleja integra var. intermedia Cockerell	1900	variety	

=== Subspecies ===
The status of the subspecies of Castilleja integra is questionable. In 2023 only Castilleja integra var. gloriosa and the autonym Castilleja integra var. integra are still regarded as a legitimate by some botanists. The USDA Natural Resources Conservation Service PLANTS database (PLANTS) and NatureServe continue to list var. gloriosa as a legitimate subspecies, while POWO, WFO, and the Flora of North America regard it as part of the normal variation of the species.

=== Names ===
The species name, integra, refers to the leaves being undivided or entire in botanical terminology. The species has a variety of common names including orange paintbrush, Southwestern paintbrush, scarlet paintbrush, grassland paintbrush, foothills paintbrush, broadbract paintbrush, wholeleaf painted cup, and wholeleaf paintbrush.

An older common name is painter's brush, recorded by Alice Eastwood in 1893. The Zuni people call Castilleja integra Tsu'yaa'wa tsi'sinakĭa in their own language, a compound word which means "hummingbird all sucking-food".

== Distribution and habitat ==
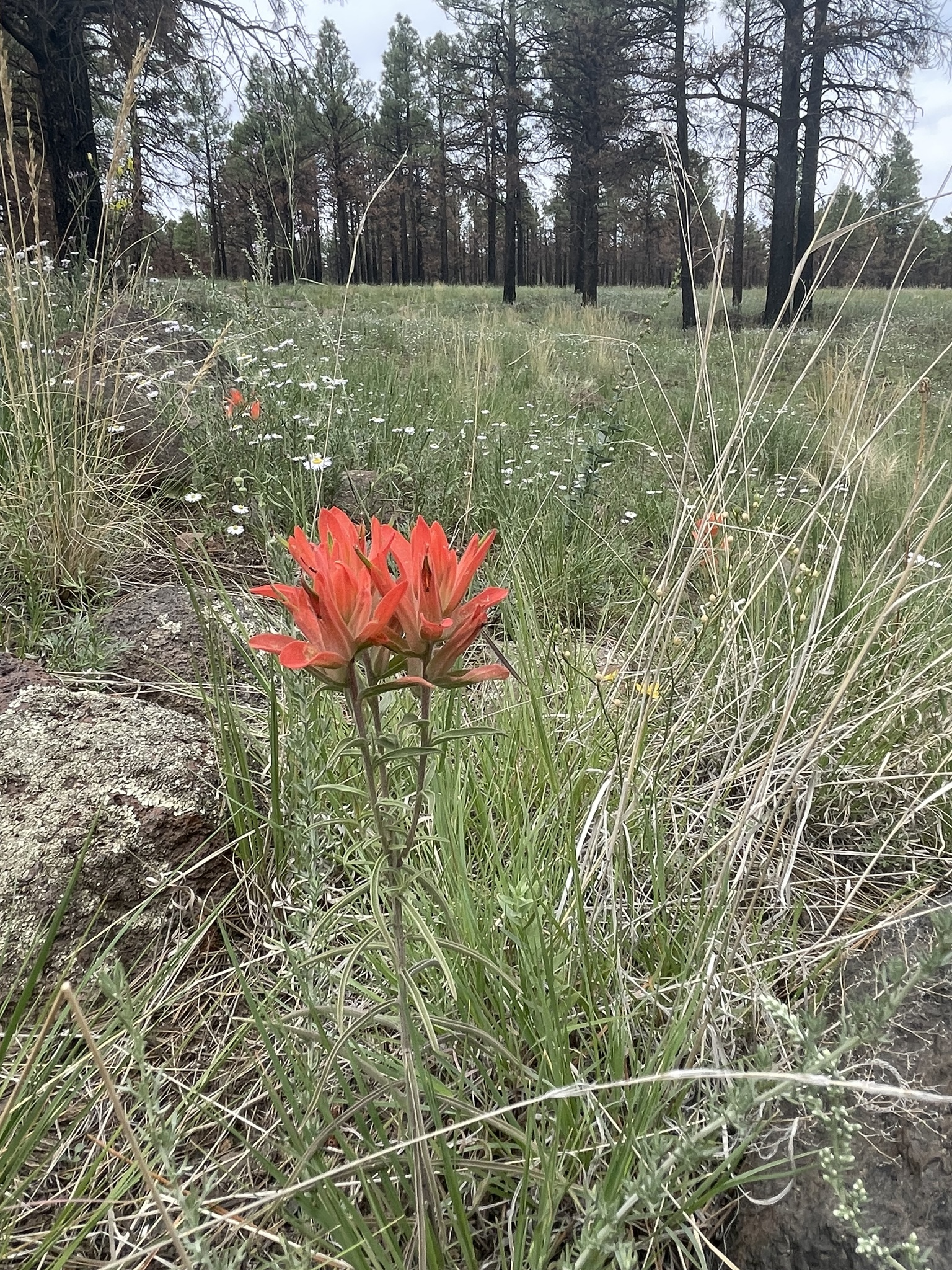
Castilleja integra flowering in Coconino National Forest, Arizona

The natural range of Castilleja integra can be broadly defined as northern Mexico and the southwestern United States. In the United States its range includes Arizona, Colorado, New Mexico, and Texas, but it not found in California or Nevada. It also grows in much of northern Mexico including the states of Baja California, Sonora, Chihuahua, Coahuila, Nuevo León, Tamaulipas, and Durango. The distribution of elevations is quite wide for this species, most often 1,000 to 3,300 meters (3,300 to 10,800 ft) and they may be occasionally be found all the way down to 600 meters (2,000 ft).

Castilleja integra can be found in a variety of wild habitats including open grasslands, dry meadows, Madrean pine–oak woodlands, open pinyon–juniper woodlands, and subalpine meadows. They are not typically found in cooler or moist habitats like aspen woodlands. They are at least somewhat fire adapted, a study finding no extirpation in low intensity wildfires and only small amount in moderate intensity fires.

=== Conservation ===
NatureServe last evaluated Castilleja integra in 1986, listing it as apparently secure (G4) at that time. They similarly found it to be apparently secure (S4) at the state level in Arizona, but they did not evaluate the rest of its range.

== Ecology ==
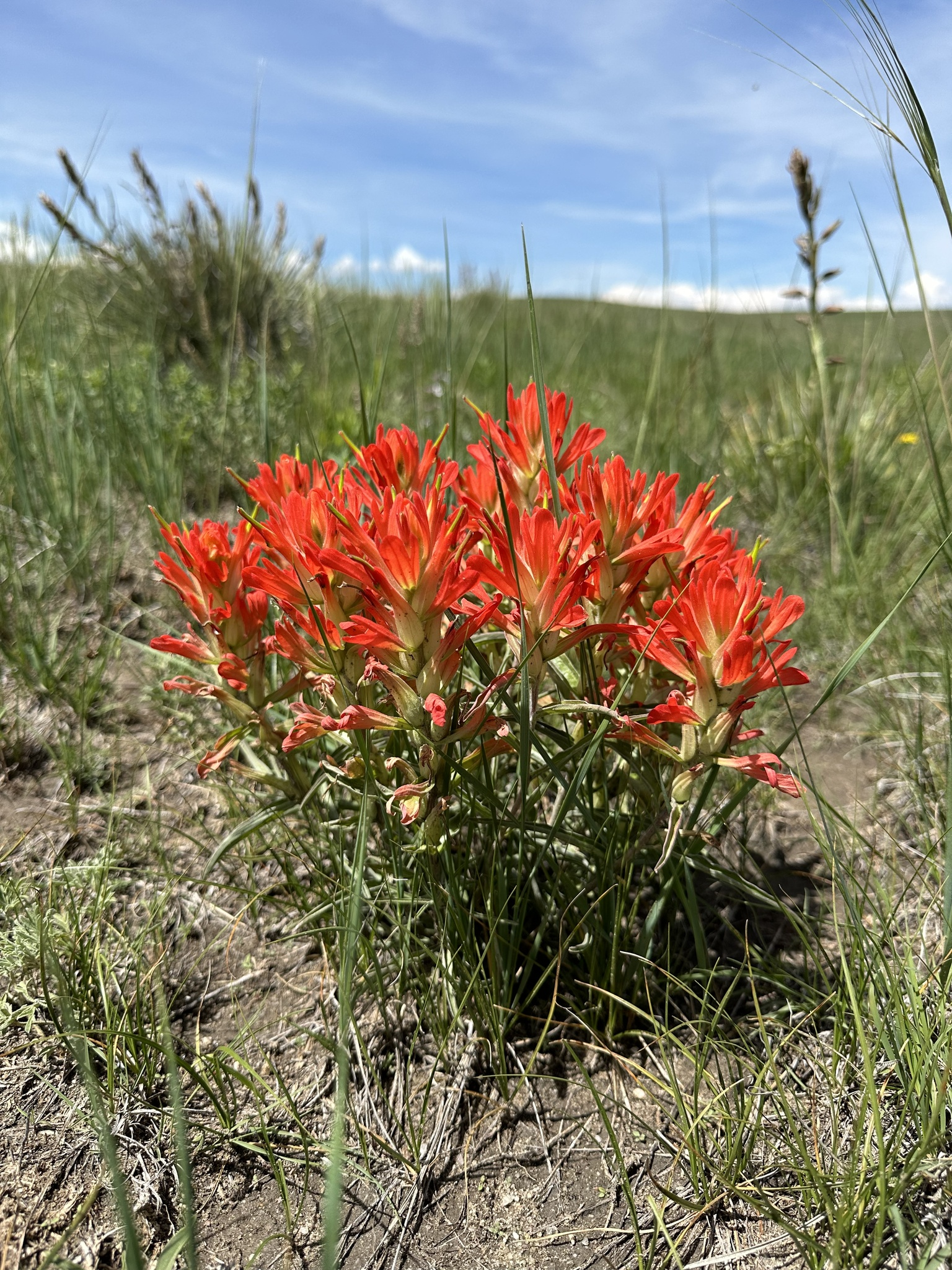
Castilleja integra blooming shortgrass prairie, Elbert County, Colorado

The variable checkerspot butterfly (Euphydryas chalcedona) feeds upon various species in both the Orobanchaceae and Scrophulariaceae families as a caterpillar, including Castilleja integra. The somewhat similar looking leanira checkerspot (Chlosyne leanira) is more selective. It is only recorded as eating the paintbrush genus, very often Castilleja integra in southern Colorado.

Hummingbirds are a frequent pollinator of Castilleja integra including the rufous hummingbird, broad-tailed hummingbird, and black-chinned hummingbird, due to the good nectar flow, each flower producing about 2 milligrams of sugar in its nectar each day. Pollen is deposited by the plants on the bill and crown of the hummingbirds, who are attracted by the nectar reward concealed in the long tube of the flower. Rufous hummingbirds of both sexes fiercely defend a territory or try to steal a territory of blooming flowers including the orange paintbrush. They try to keep approximately the same number of flowers within the territory and only abandon a territory due to aggression or as the number of flowers decrease.

Castailleja integra is considered to be a hemi-parasite, because a host plant is not required for seedlings to sprout and they can photosynthesize to produce at least some of their own energy. It is partially dependent on a host plant for healthy growth and in potted tests has been found to not survive longer than three months without one. Both the size and the survival of plants is improved when they have a host plant. Known host plants include Artemisia frigida, Artemisia michauxiana, Calylophus serrulatus, Ericameria nauseosa, Liatris punctata, Oxytropis sericea, Penstemon pinifolius, Penstemon attenuatus, Penstemon strictus, Penstemon teucrioides, Calylophus serrulatus, Eriogonum strictum, and Eriogonum jamesii.

When Castailleja integra was tested with Campanula petiolata, Erigeron elatior, Penstemon virens, Tetraneuris scaposa, or Liatris spicata as host plants it had no survival in field plantings after 14 months. When planted with Antennaria media the rate was 3% and with Zinnia grandiflora and Penstemon crandallii it had 17% survival at 14 months. When planted with a host plant in a pot there was 10% or less survival of C. integra after three months when paired with Eriogonum umbellatum var. dichrocephalum, Gaillardia spathulata or Geum triflorum. Likewise, silvery lupine (Lupinus argenteus) does not support Castailleja integra very readily, with only one out of forty pairings blooming in a one year test in 2004.

== Uses ==
=== Cultivation ===
Paintbrush flowers are a desirable species in gardens for their showy flowers and attraction of hummingbirds, but can be difficult to grow because of their dependence upon a host species and dislike of being transplanted. This means that plants grown for sale by nurseries must be grown with a compatible host plant in the same pot that will also be desirable to buyers. Orange paintbrush and desert paintbrush (Castilleja chromosa) are two of the most tolerant species of garden conditions and being transplanted. The best survival rates for orange paintbrush when planted in pots are with fringed sagebrush, lemon sagewort, rubber rabbitbrush, pine-leaved penstemon, yellow sundrops, Blue Mountain buckwheat, or antelope sage. Among penstemon species, Penstemon strictus has some of the best survival rates. Distance from the host plant is also a factor, with the survival rate falling by more than 80% when placed at a distance of 4 centimeters instead of just 2 centimeters. Gardening sources often mention grasses as a host species for paintbrush flowers and Bouteloua gracilis is recommended by gardening books. Plants rarely survive being transplanted once established, and for this reason they are generally not moved in gardens or transplanted from the wild.

Orange paintbrush is best suited to unproductive soils, ones without much organic material, that drain very well. They also have proven adaptable to parasitizing species from outside their native range, such as sheep fescue. Orange paintbrush will grow in areas as cold as USDA zone 4, minimum temperatures of −34.5 to −29 °C (−30 to −20 °F) and as warm as zone 8.

=== Traditional uses ===
The Zuni people used the root's bark, mixed with minerals, to dye deerskin black.
