= Dunnville Barrens State Natural Area =

State-protected natural area in Dunn County, Wisconsin

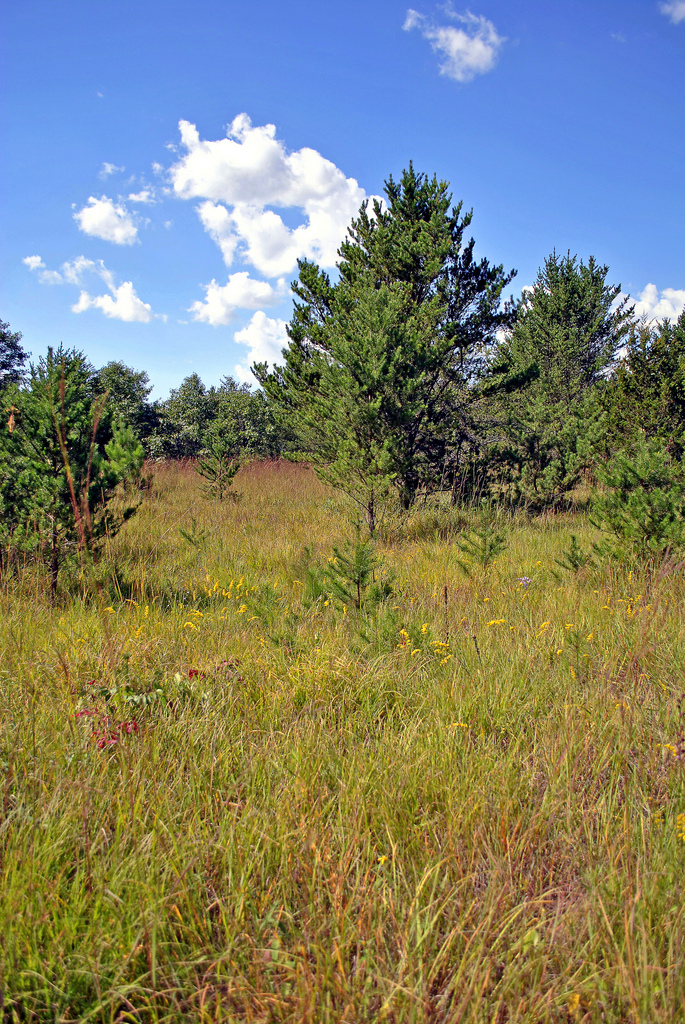

- Location within Wisconsin Location within the United States
- Location: Dunn County, Wisconsin
- Coordinates: 44°44′2.37″N 91°51′43.07″W
- Area: 633 acres (256 ha)
- Established: 2010
- Owner: Wisconsin Department of Natural Resources
- Website: Official website
- Wisconsin State Natural Areas

Dunnville Barrens is a Wisconsin Department of Natural Resources-designated State Natural Area featuring a jack pine barrens plant community on a wide, sandy Chippewa River terrace. Open areas in the barrens contain scattered shrubs, such as beaked hazelnut, with a ground layer composed of dry sand prairie species, including little bluestem, purple prairie clover, and fameflower. The eastern portion of the site contains an open area of swale topography, with areas of both wet and dry prairie. Plant composition in this area is diverse and includes species such as big bluestem, cream baptisia (Baptisia bracteata), Michigan lily, downy gentian (Gentiana puberulenta), prairie alum-root (Heuchera richarsonii), and Culver's root. Uncommon animal species include gorgone checkerspot, Leonard's skipper, and five-lined skink.

== Location and access ==
Dunnville Barrens is located within the Dunnville Wildlife Area, in south-central Dunn County, approximately 2 miles (3.2 km) northeast of Dunnville. Access is via 580th St., which meanders through the western portion of the site containing the jack pine barrens. The eastern portion of the site, containing the swale topography, can be accessed via 640th St.

== Gallery ==
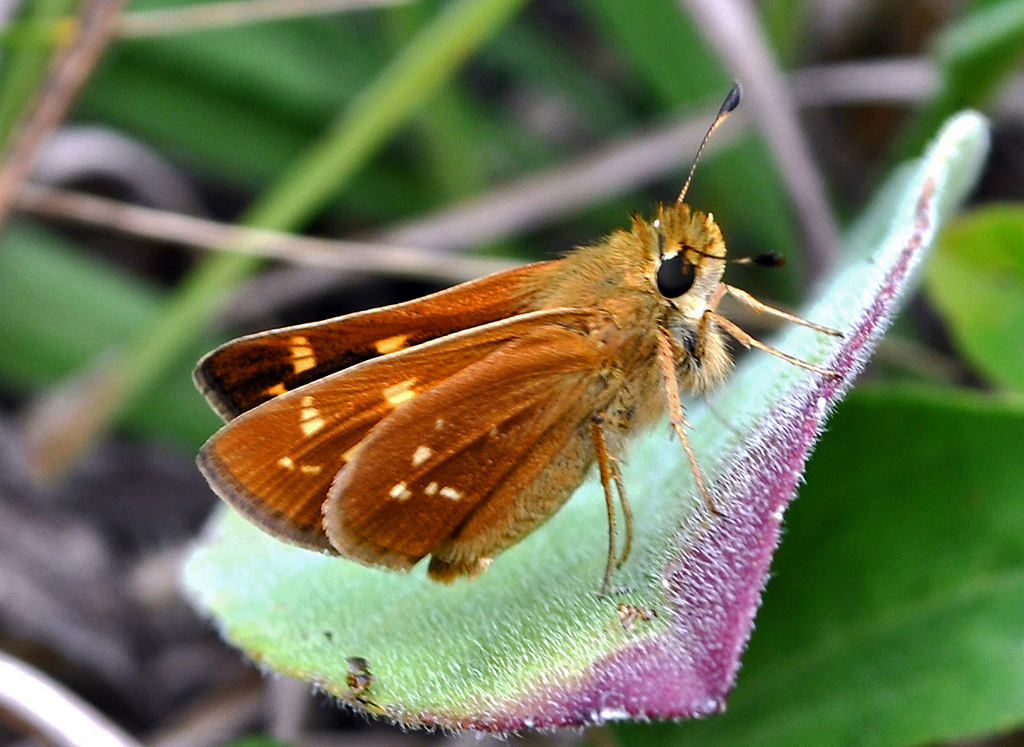
Leonard's skipper photographed at Dunnville Barrens

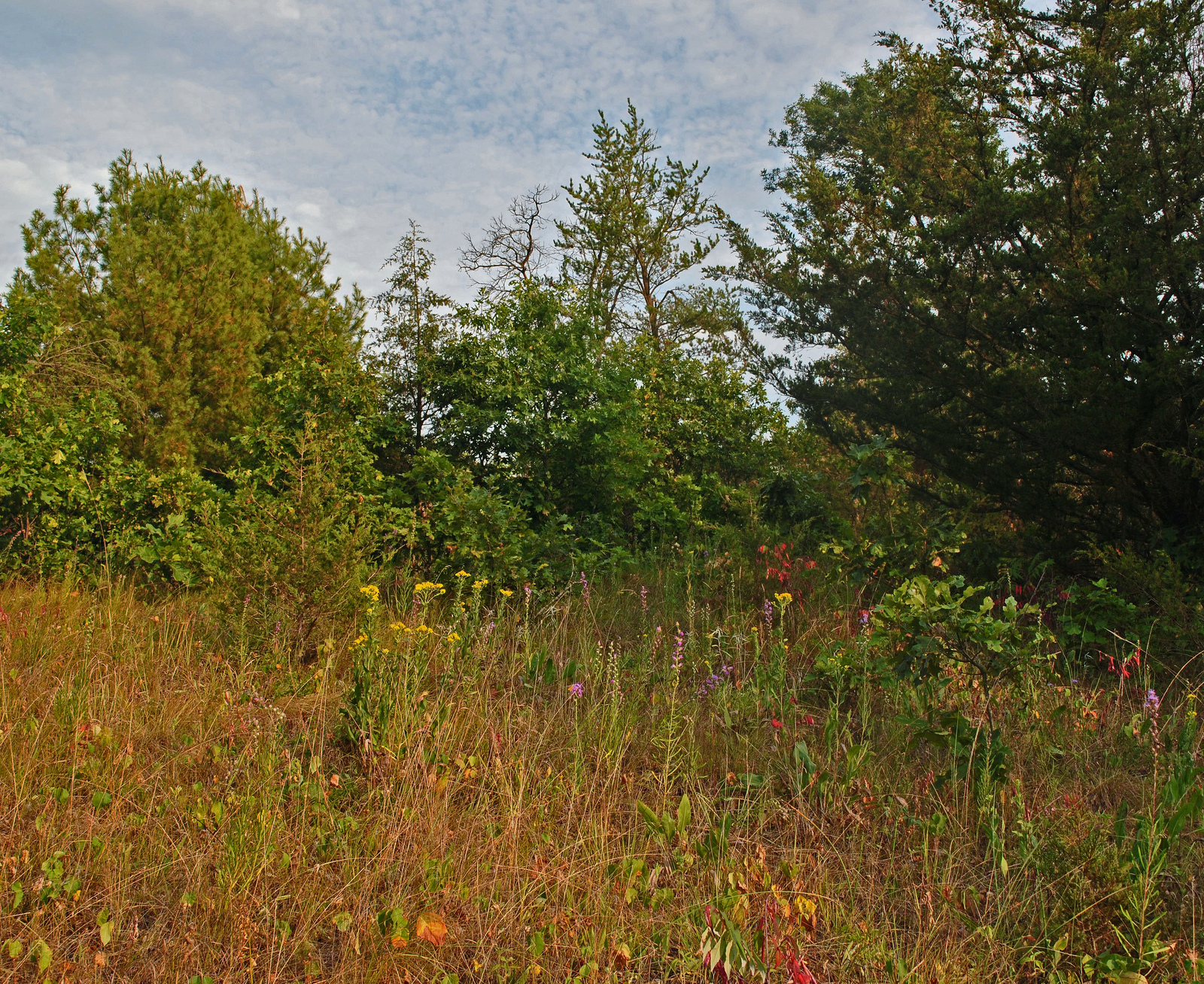
Jack pine barrens found in the northwest portion of the site

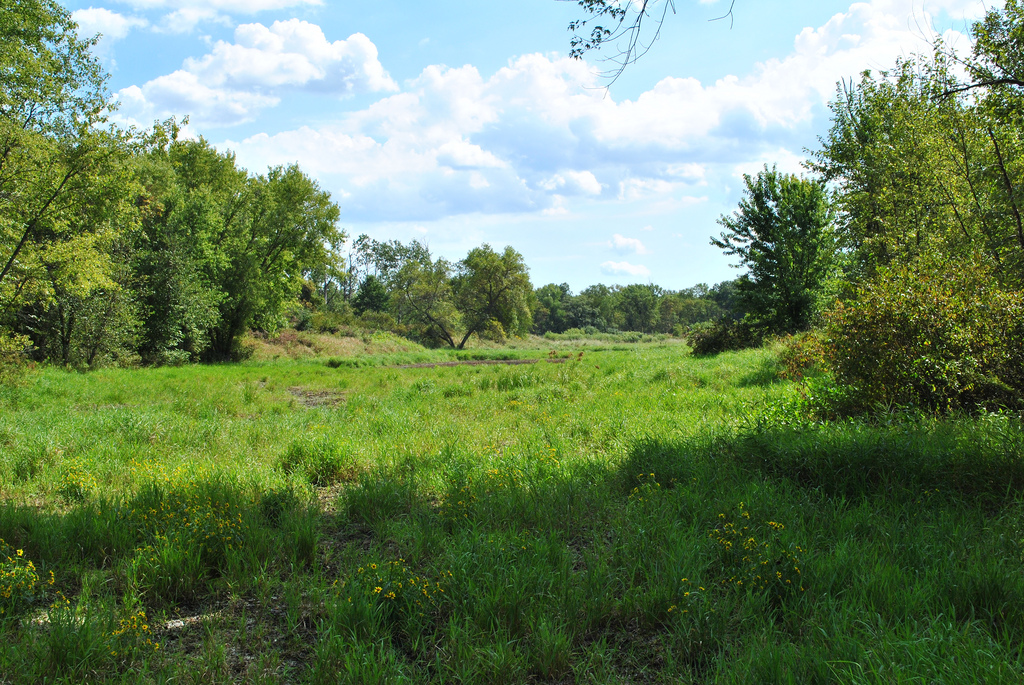
Wetland lying in a former Chippewa River channel, in the southwest corner of the site
