= Eriogonum sericeum =

Eriogonum sericeum is a botanical synonym of two species of plant:

- Eriogonum flavum var. flavum, Eriogonum sericeum published by Frederick Traugott Pursh in 1813
- Eriogonum jamesii var. jamesii, Eriogonum sericeum published by John Torrey and Asa Gray in 1870
