= Narrow-leaved blazingstar =

Narrow-leaved blazingstar is a common name for several plants and may refer to:

- Liatris punctata
- Mentzelia linearifolia
