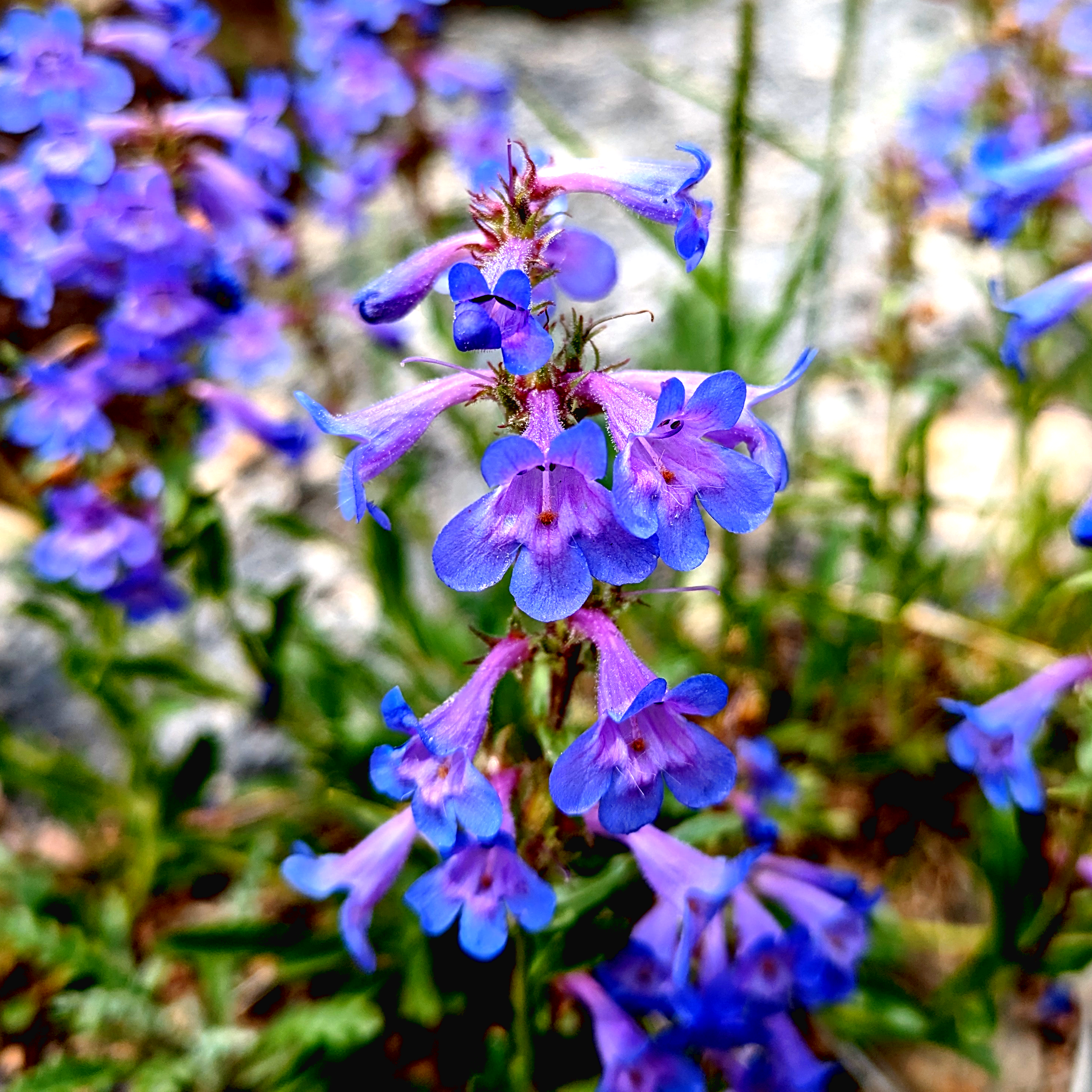
- Penstemon virens

Conservation status
- Vulnerable (NatureServe)

Scientific classification
- Kingdom: Plantae
- Clade: Tracheophytes
- Clade: Angiosperms
- Clade: Eudicots
- Clade: Asterids
- Order: Lamiales
- Family: Plantaginaceae
- Genus: Penstemon
- Species: P. virens

Binomial name
- Penstemon virens Pennell ex Rydb.
- Penstemon virens range map, estimated with the iNaturalist Geomodel, 2025

= Penstemon virens =

Species of flowering plant

Penstemon virens, commonly known as blue mist penstemon, Front Range penstemon, or Green beardtongue, is a common Penstemon in the Front Range foothills in Colorado and Wyoming. The dainty flowers are an ornament to many rocky or sandy area within its range. It is confusingly similar to Penstemon humilis and Penstemon albertinus though the ranges of these plants do not overlap in the wild. The origin of calling it the "blue mist penstemon" is not precisely known, but is thought to relate to the large number of blue flowers the plant can produce reminding observers of a blue mist.

== Description ==
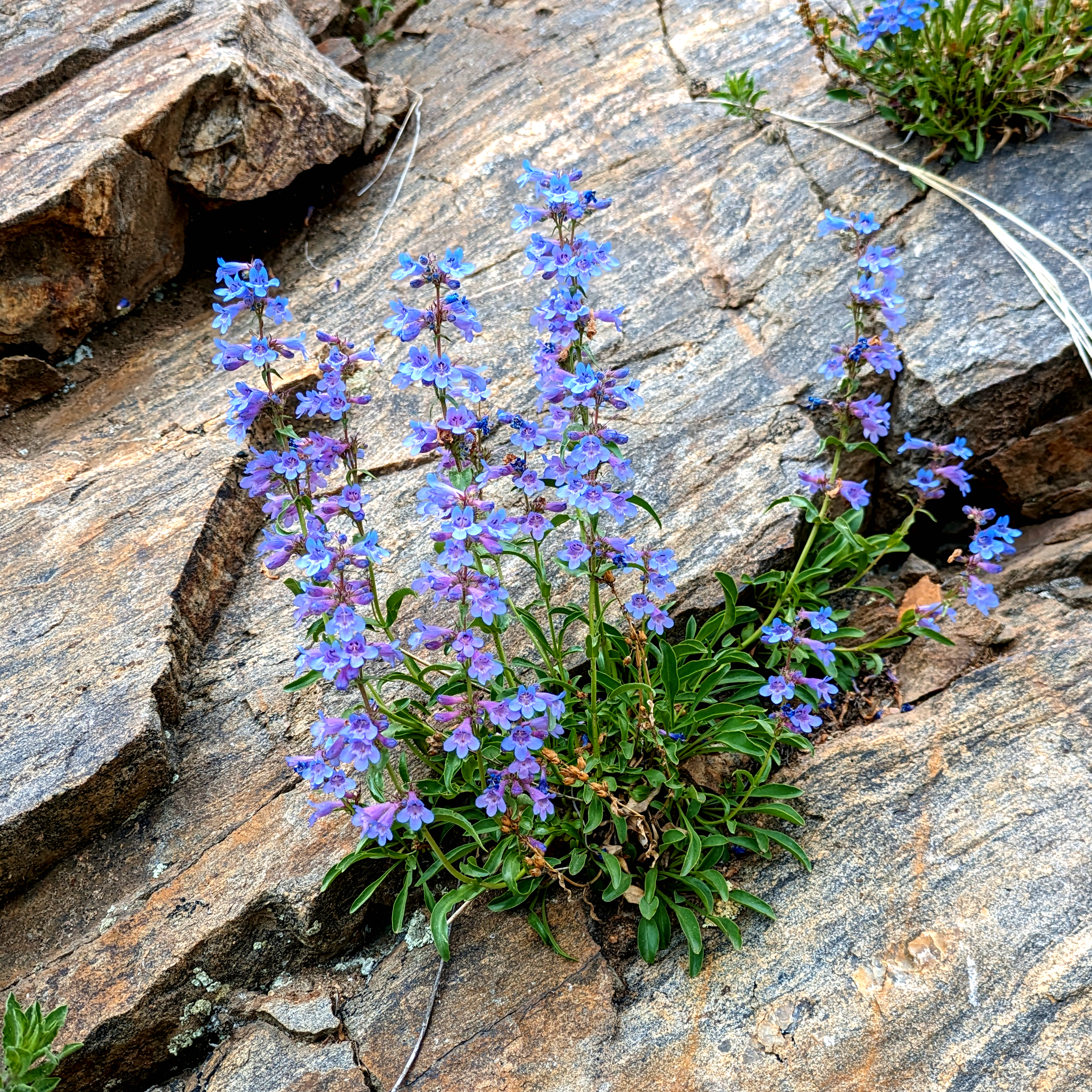
Penstemon Virens growing from a rockface, Clear Creek County.

Penstemon virens has flowering stems are typically 10–40 cm in height and stand upright with very little curve. The stems are covered in extremely fine and short hairs that increase to being glandular and hairy closer to the buds and flowers, but are rarely almost or completely hairless.

Most of the leaves are at the base of the plant and relatively short, 2–10.2 cm long. These basal leaves are bright green, smooth, shiny, and have smooth or very finely toothed edges (denticulate margins). Though smooth, the leaves are not leathery or thick, and are oblanceolate to spatulate with a tapered base and 4–15 mm in width. The end of the leaves are mildly pointed, ranging from obtuse to acute. The leaves attached to the flowering stems are also hairless, have smooth leaf edges, lancelolate to slightly ovate in shape, and shorter than the basal leaves, 1.8–5 cm in length and 3–14 mm wide. The form of the plant is a low, spreading mat that enlarges each year, with leaves that persist over the winter in most locations.

The flowering stem is a thyrse, it grows without a genetically determined limit, but instead stops due to environmental conditions. It will typically have 3-6 clusters of flowers on the stem just above each leaf pair. Close examination will show that the flower clusters are actually paired groups on opposite sides of the stem (a verticillaster), but they will face in every direction. The flowers of Penstemon virens have five green, glandular-pubescent sepals at the base of the flower that are ovate to lanceolate, 2–4.5 mm long and 1.5-2.5 mm wide at the base. The edge of each sepal is edged with red. The flower is a tapered funnel 10–16 mm long and pale sky blue to light purple or violet. The flower divides into five rounded petals at its front and has purple-blue to reddish-purple nectar guides from the center of each petal leading down into the flower. The outside of the flower is glandular-pubescent and on the inside has moderate amount of fine white fuzz on the inside of the flower. The throat of the flower tube has an inside diameter of 3–5 mm, about 4–5 mm on the outside.

The lower lip and just inside the tube will have a few white longer hairs. The infertile fifth stamen, the staminode for which the genus is named, is a hairy golden-brown, and 8–10 mm long. It will almost reach the end of the flower tube. The four fertile stamens are paired above, curve inwards and upwards, and are purple to pink-white. The style is 8–11 mm long.

The seed capsules are small tear drop shapes about 5–7 mm long and 2–3 mm wide and are ripe towards the end of July or the beginning of August at lower elevations.

== Taxonomy ==
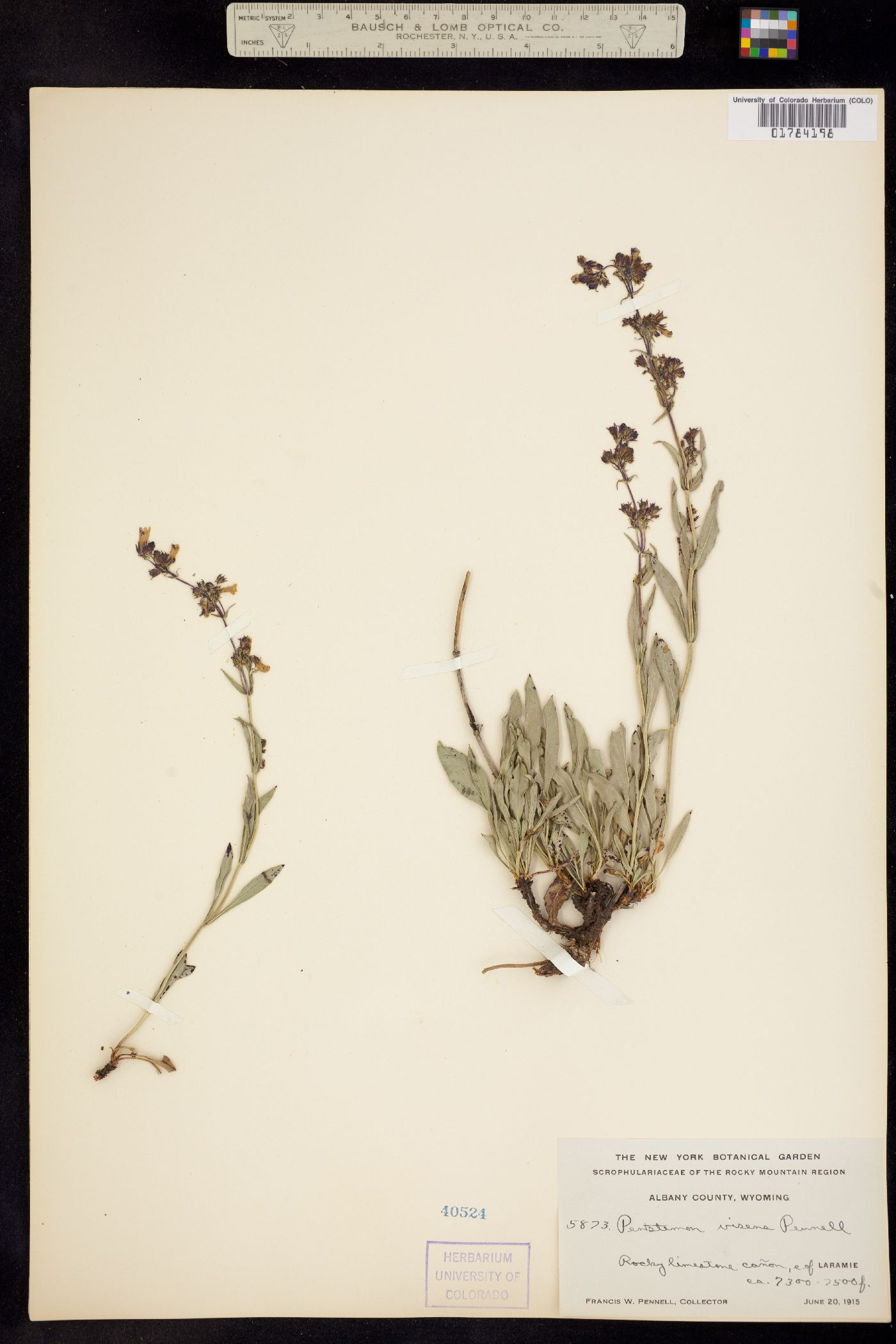
Herbarium specimen, collected near Laramie, Wyoming

The first recorded collection of Penstemon virens was by Francis W. Pennell on 9 June 1915 on Ute Creek north of Manitou Springs, CO. On the same trip he collected at least two more specimens from Colorado and two from locations in Wyoming, with the type specimen collected 13 June on a hillside west of Morrison, CO. The famous Swedish-American botanist Per Axel Rydberg published a description that credited Pennell for the description in his book Flora of the Rocky Mountains and Adjacent Plains in 1917. However, Rydberg is now credited with making formal description.

=== Names ===
The name of the species, "virens", is the present active participle of the Latin word vireō ("I am green"). Three of its common names relate to its appearance. A variation on its scientific name is the name "green beardtounge", a description of the particularly green and shiny leaves of the species. The common name, "blue mist penstemon", may either refer to the cloud of flowers on multiple stems facing every direction or the occasionally spectacular displays of hillsides covered with a low blue mist of flowers. They are additionally called the "low penstemon" for their relatively short stature, but this name is shared with Penstemon humilis, a similar species from elsewhere in the western US. Another of the common names relates to its native habitat, in and near the Front Range of Colorado and southern Wyoming.

== Habitat and distribution ==
Penstemon virens is commonly found growing on rocky slopes, on rock outcrops, in forest openings, along road cuts, and other disturbed areas. They grow from 1600 to 3000 m in elevation.

Penstemon virens is common in its habitat, but not widely distributed. Plants are found on the Medicine Bow Range in southeastern Wyoming south to Culebra Range in southeastern Colorado. It is common in the mountains and foothills of the Front Range in between and also on the Palmer Divide in Colorado. It is recorded by the USDA Natural Resources Conservation Service PLANTS database (PLANTS) with county level records in Colorado and Wyoming. NatureServe assessed P. virens as globally vulnerable (G3) in 1993. At the state level they did not assess populations in Colorado and evaluated Wyoming populations as "imperiled" (S2).

== Ecology ==
Penstemon virens tend to grow together in large numbers rather than singly or scattered throughout the landscape, rarely fewer than 10 plants in a population. Most species observed visiting and entering the flowers of P. virens are bees. The most frequent visitors are members of genus Lasioglossum, but genus Osmia, genus Bombus, and honeybees also frequently visit them. Specific species observed include Apis mellifera, Augochlorella aurata, Bombus huntii, Bombus rufocinctus, Bombus centralis, Halictus tripartitus, Hoplitis truncata, Lasioglossum sisymbrii, and Lasioglossum trizonatum. They are also sometimes visited by beeflies (Bombyliidae) and butterflies, but they have not been observed contacting reproductive parts and are thought to be necatar robbers. Hummingbirds, though present in the range, have not yet been scientifically observed visiting P. virens.

A study of plant responses to wildfire found that Penstemon virens was found in similar number of areas before and after five years of recovery from fires. Though it does recover from fires an earlier study found that P. virens is significantly associated with areas of historic low-intensity fires in ponderosa pine forests.

Penstemon virens was evaluated as a potential host for Castilleja integra and was found by the researchers to not support this partially parasitic plant for more than a few weeks.

== Cultivation ==
Blue mist penstemons are recommended as garden plants by local governments, water providers, and extension services for areas in or near the Front Range. They are prized for their low water usage, adaptation to local climate, handsome blooms, long lifespan, and ease of cultivation. They are drought tolerant once established, but not adapted to constantly dry conditions.

In garden settings they are adapted to full sun to partial shade conditions in the west and full sun in the east of the United States. They are quite adaptable to different garden soil conditions, but like all penstemons are healthier with good drainage. Dr. Dale Lindgren of the University of Nebraska writes that their seeds require cold and moist stratification of six weeks at 4.5 °C for good germination rates or to be planted outside over the winter. However, experiments by Dr. Norman C. Deno indicate that period of dry warm storage of around 21 °C (70 °F) for six months before cool moist stratification is critical. His research also showed that seeds left in the dry stems after ripening accomplish the same effect in natural settings. The coldest USDA hardiness zones where this plant is known to survive is zone 4.

== See also ==
- List of Penstemon species
