= Tall fleabane =

Tall fleabane is a common name for several plants and may refer to:

- Erigeron annuus, native to North and Central America and naturalized in Europe and Asia
- Erigeron bonariensis, native to South and Central America and widely naturalized
- Erigeron elatior, native to the southern Rocky Mountains of the United States
- Erigeron sumatrensis, native to South and Central America and widely naturalized
