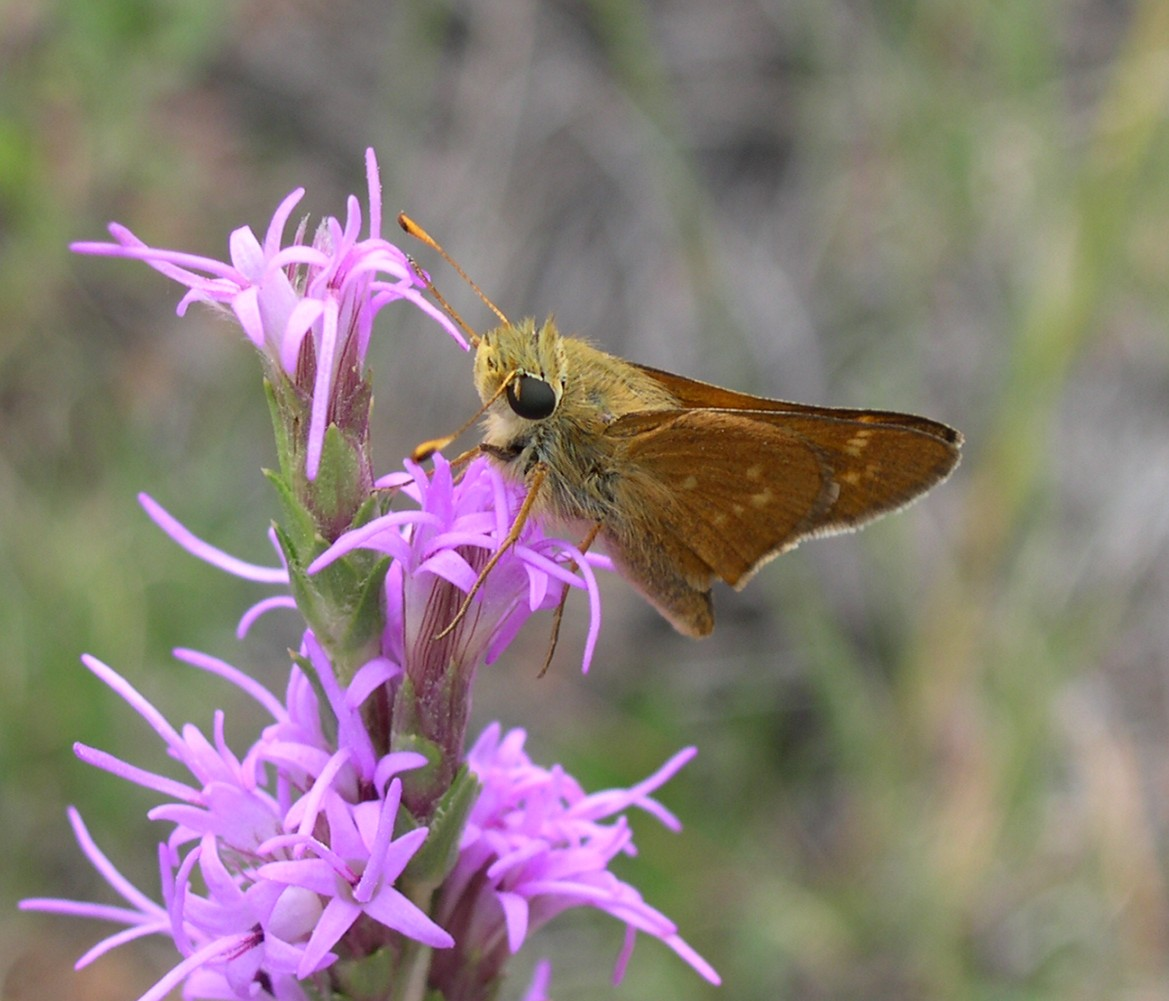
- H. l. montana

Conservation status
- Apparently Secure (NatureServe)

Scientific classification
- Kingdom: Animalia
- Phylum: Arthropoda
- Class: Insecta
- Order: Lepidoptera
- Family: Hesperiidae
- Genus: Hesperia
- Species: H. leonardus

Binomial name
- Hesperia leonardus Harris, 1862

Synonyms
- Anthomaster leonardus; Hesperia stallingsi (HA Freeman, 1943); Hesperia ogallala (Leussler, 1921)

= Hesperia leonardus =

Leonard's skipper

Species of butterfly

Hesperia leonardus, the Leonard's skipper, is a butterfly of the family Hesperiidae. There are three subspecies. Next to the nominate species, these are the Pawnee skipper (ssp. pawnee), which is found in North America from western Montana and south-eastern Saskatchewan east to Minnesota, south to central Colorado and Kansas. Leonard's skipper ranges from Nova Scotia and Maine west through southern Ontario and the Great Lakes region to Minnesota, south to North Carolina, Louisiana and Missouri and the Pawnee montane skipper (ssp. montana) is endemic to the South Platte River drainage of Colorado.

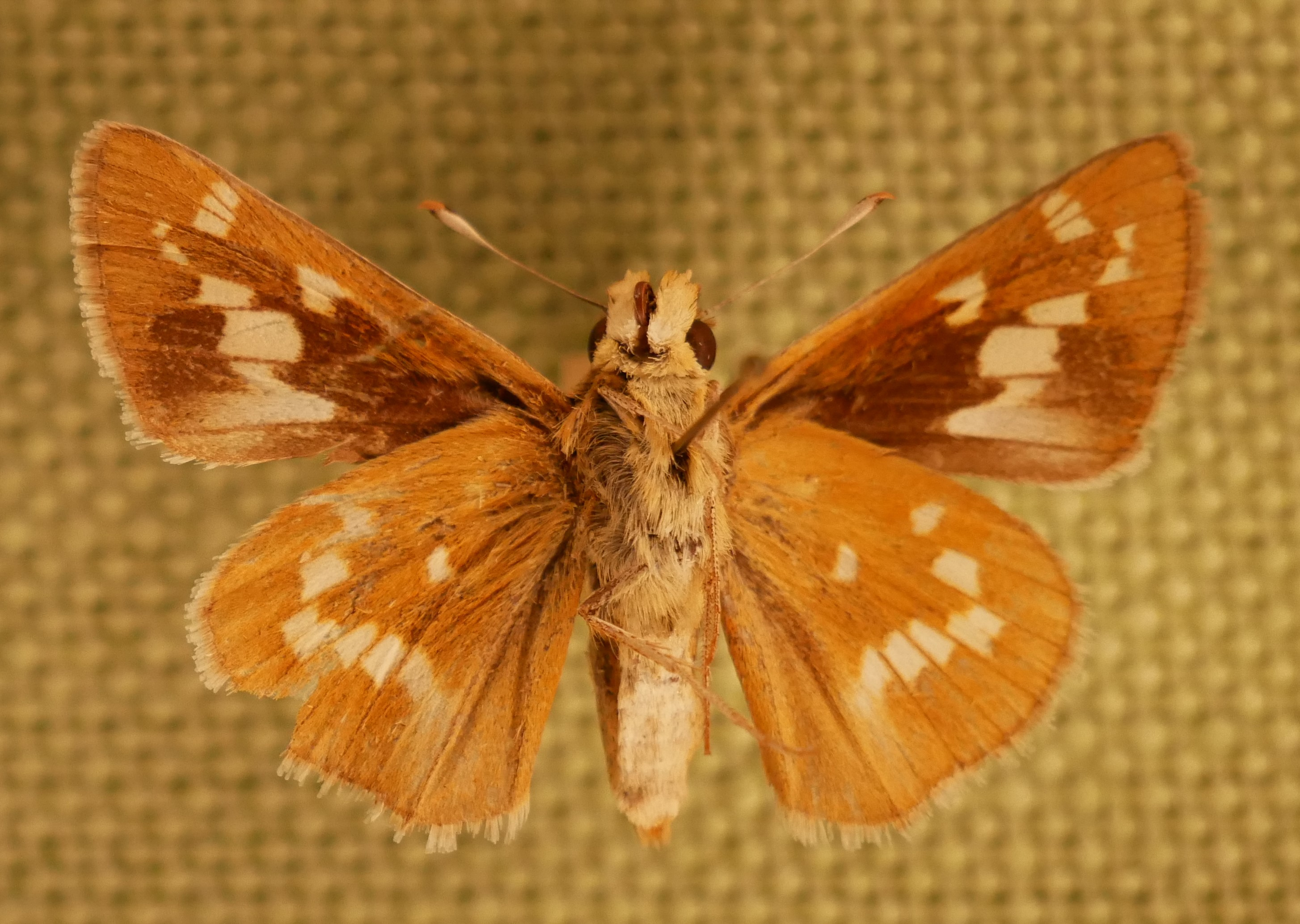
Hesperia leonardus museum specimen

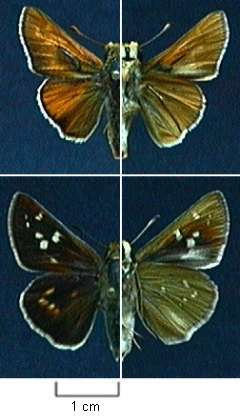
H. l. pawnee

The wingspan is 32–45 mm. There is one generation with adults on wing from August to October.

The larvae feed on various grasses, including Andropogon scoparius, Bouteloua gracilis, and Agrostis. Adults feed on flower nectar from various flowers, including Liatris punctata, thistles, asters, and teasel.

== Subspecies ==
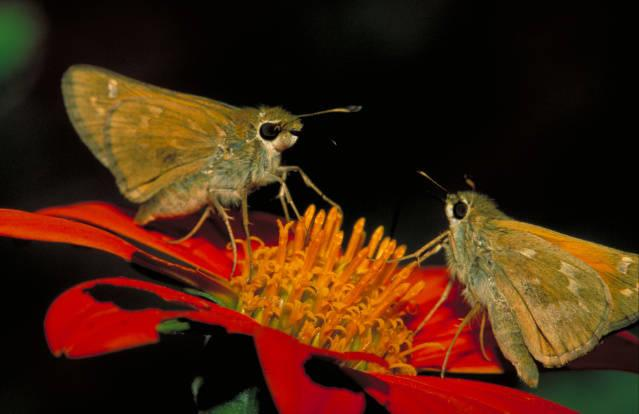
Hesperia leonardus leonardus on Tithonia diversifolia

- Hesperia leonardus leonardus Harris, 1862
- Hesperia leonardus montana (Skinner, 1911) – Pawnee montane skipper or mountain skipper
- Hesperia leonardus pawnee Dodge, 1874 – Pawnee skipper
