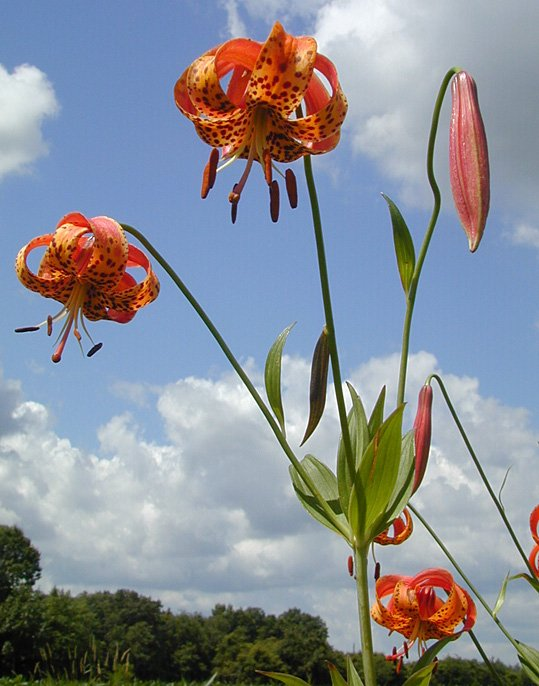

Conservation status
- Secure (NatureServe)

Scientific classification
- Kingdom: Plantae
- Clade: Tracheophytes
- Clade: Angiosperms
- Clade: Monocots
- Order: Liliales
- Family: Liliaceae
- Subfamily: Lilioideae
- Tribe: Lilieae
- Genus: Lilium
- Species: L. michiganense

Binomial name
- Lilium michiganense Farw.

Synonyms
- Synonymy: Lilium canadense subsp. michiganense (Farw.) B.Boivin & Cody; Lilium michiganense var. umbelliferum Farw.; Lilium michiganense var. uniflorum Farw.; Lilium michiganense f. umbelliferum (Farw.) Wherry; Lilium michiganense f. uniflorum (Farw.) Wherry; Lilium canadense f. uniflorum (Farw.) B.Boivin & Cody; Lilium canadense var. umbelliferum (Farw.) B.Boivin

= Lilium michiganense =

Species of lily

Lilium michiganense is a species of true lily commonly referred to as the Michigan lily. It is a wildflower present in prairie habitats in the Great Lakes and Upper Mississippi Valley regions of the United States and Canada, from South Dakota through Ontario to New York, south to Georgia and Oklahoma.

Growing to 5 ft (1.5 m) tall by 2 ft (0.61 m) broad, Lilium michiganense is a bulbous herbaceous perennial with showy flowers in summer. The flowers are orange with dark brown spots and acutely recurved petals. This plant is widely cultivated as an ornamental.

The Michigan lily is often confused with the Turk's cap lily (Lilium superbum) and with a naturalized Asian "tiger lily" Lilium lancifolium. The leaf arrangement is typically whorled, but sometimes alternate just below the inflorescence and at the very base of stem.

== Endangered status ==
The Michigan lily is an endangered species in the state of New York, where it occurs in Monroe, Jefferson and St. Lawrence counties. It is listed as threatened in Tennessee.
