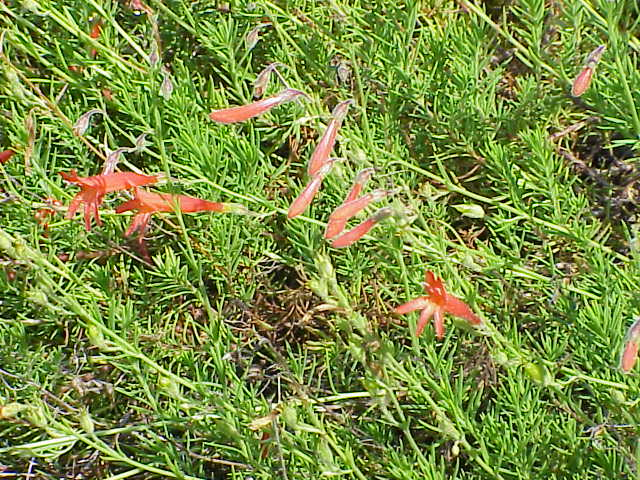

Conservation status
- Apparently Secure (NatureServe)

Scientific classification
- Kingdom: Plantae
- Clade: Tracheophytes
- Clade: Angiosperms
- Clade: Eudicots
- Clade: Asterids
- Order: Lamiales
- Family: Plantaginaceae
- Genus: Penstemon
- Species: P. pinifolius

Binomial name
- Penstemon pinifolius Greene

= Penstemon pinifolius =

Plant species in the veronica family

Penstemon pinifolius, the pineleaf penstemon or pine needle penstemon, is a species of flowering plant in the veronica family that is native to the southwestern USA and northern Mexico. It is a spreading evergreen often found in rocky habitats.

== Description ==
Penstemon pinifolius is a short plant with erect stems, ones that grow straight upwards, usually 10 to 50 centimeters (4 to 20 in) tall, but occasionally just 5 cm (2 in) when full grown. The stems can be hairless or covered in retrorse, backward pointing, hairs with sharp points. Its habit is evergreen and it spreads outwards as a subshrub.

Each stem will have 10 to 30 pairs of leaves. The leaves are narrow and needle-like. The surface of the leaves can be hairless or sparsely covered in retrorse hairs, especially on their edges. They measure 4 to 32 millimeters long and just 0.5 to 1.2 mm wide.

The flowers are usually showy and bright scarlet red, but yellow flowers are sometimes found wild in parts of the Magdalena Mountains. They are salverform, trumpet shaped, and measure 2.5 to 3.2 centimeters (1.0 to 1.3 in) long. The inside of the flower's throat does not have any nectar guidelines, but may be yellow to orange spotted. The stamens extend beyond the mouth of the flower, but are usually hidden by floral lobes. The fuzzy, yellow staminode is 1.2–1.7 cm and does not extend out of the flower.

== Taxonomy ==
Penstemon pinifolius was scientifically described by the botanist Edward Lee Greene in 1881. It has no subspecies or botanical synonyms and is classified in the genus Penstemon in the family Plantaginaceae.

=== Names ===
Penstemon pinifolius is known by several similar common names including pineleaf penstemon, pine needle penstemon, and pine-leaved penstemon. It is also called the pineneedle beardtongue and pine-leaf beardtongue.

== Range and habitat ==
Pineleaf penstemon is native to the southwestern US and northern Mexico. In Mexico its range includes five states, Chihuahua, Hidalgo, Querétaro, Sonora, and Tamaulipas. In Chihuahua and Sonora it grows in Sierra Madre Occidental mountains.

In the United States it grows in Cochise and Greenlee counties in the southeastern corner of Arizona. The principle range where they are found is the Chiricahua Mountains, but also the Mogollon Mountains crossing over into New Mexico. It grows more extensively in New Mexico being found in Catron, Socorro, Luna, Grant and Hidalgo counties in the southwestern part of the state. It is found in the Black Range, Cookes Range, Pinos Altos Mountains, Animas Mountains, San Mateo Mountains, and Magdalena Mountains.

It grows frequently on rocky slopes and cliffs. Plants often grow on limestone in the mountains of New Mexico.

=== Conservation ===
When reviewed by NatureServe in 2018 they rated the species as apparently secure (G4) due to its large range, although the larger portion in Mexico is not well documented.

== Cultivation ==
The species and the cultivar 'Wisley Flame' have both gained the Royal Horticultural Society's Award of Garden Merit. 'Mersea Yellow' is another notable cultivar, with brilliant lemon-yellow flowers.

Though moderately hardy to −10 °C (14 °F) it requires an extremely well-drained, sunny position with some protection from hard frosts in winter.
