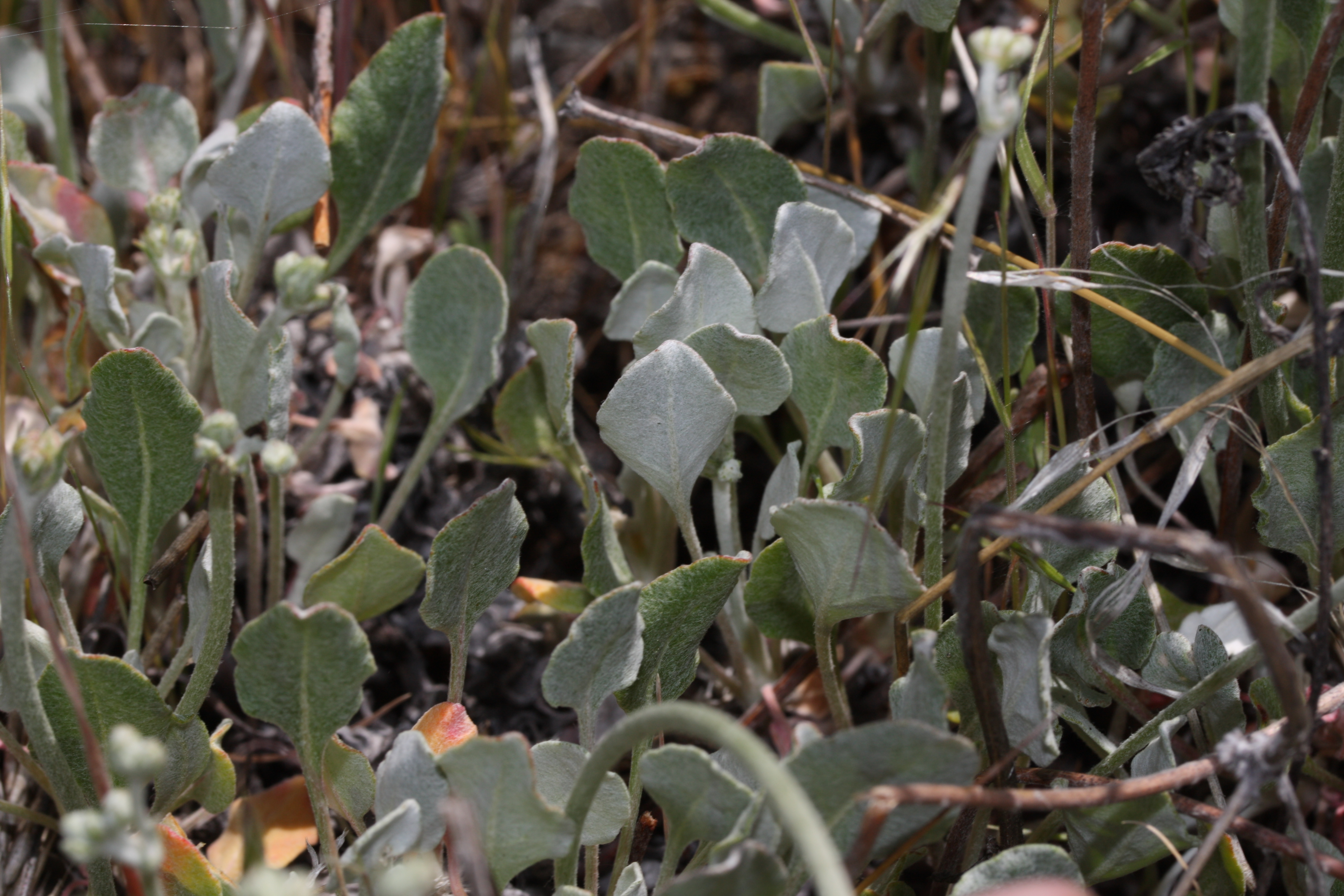
- Eriogonum strictum in Wenas Wildlife Area

Scientific classification
- Kingdom: Plantae
- Clade: Tracheophytes
- Clade: Angiosperms
- Clade: Eudicots
- Order: Caryophyllales
- Family: Polygonaceae
- Genus: Eriogonum
- Species: E. strictum

Binomial name
- Eriogonum strictum Benth.

= Eriogonum strictum =

Species of plant

Eriogonum strictum is a species of wild buckwheat known by the common name Blue Mountain buckwheat. It is a common plant of western North America from northern California to British Columbia where it is found along rocky slopes and scrubland. It flowers early in the summer.

== Description ==
A perennial herb, the plant forms leaf mats up to 40 centimeters wide and many branches with erect inflorescences on stems ranging from 10 to 35 centimetres (3 7/8 to 13 3/4 in) in height. The woolly, oval-shaped leaves grow from near the base and are one to four centimeters long. They are usually held vertically on a long petiole and often appear silvery in color due to the dense woolly hairs.

The slender inflorescence stalks are woolly and produce flower clusters at the top. The flowers are cream to pale yellow, and darken to reddish or orange.
