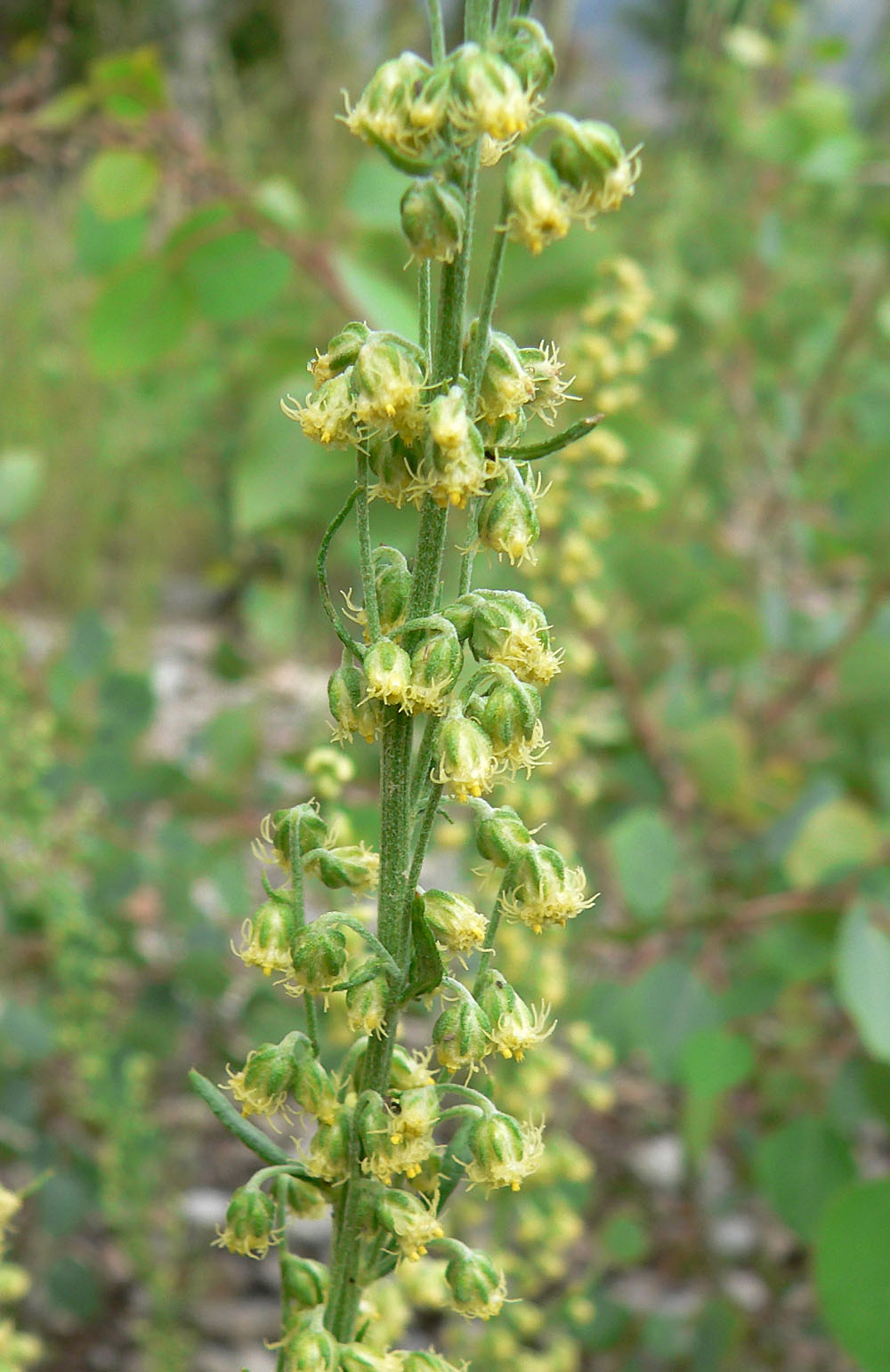
- In the Spring Mountains of Nevada at elev. 2500 meters

Conservation status
- Secure (NatureServe)

Scientific classification
- Kingdom: Plantae
- Clade: Tracheophytes
- Clade: Angiosperms
- Clade: Eudicots
- Clade: Asterids
- Order: Asterales
- Family: Asteraceae
- Genus: Artemisia
- Species: A. michauxiana

Binomial name
- Artemisia michauxiana Besser

Synonyms
- Artemisia discolor Douglas ex Besser 1836, rejected name not Douglas ex DC. 1838; Artemisia vulgaris subsp. michauxiana (Besser) H.St.John

= Artemisia michauxiana =

Species of flowering plant

Artemisia michauxiana is a North American species of wormwood in the sunflower family. It is known by the common names Michaux's wormwood and lemon sagewort. It is native to the western United States and Canada. It grows in mountain talus habitats in subalpine to alpine climates.

Artemisia michauxiana is a rhizomatous perennial herb with green, lemon-scented foliage. The plant grows up to 100 cm (40 inches) tall with several erect branches. The leaves are divided into many narrow segments which are hairless or lightly hairy and bear yellowish resin glands. The inflorescence is a spike up to 15 centimeters long full of clusters of small flower heads. Each head is lined with rough purplish green, glandular phyllaries and generally contains pale pistillate and disc florets. The fruit is a tiny hairless achene.
