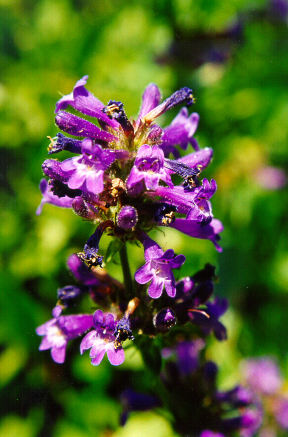

Conservation status
- Apparently Secure (NatureServe)

Scientific classification
- Kingdom: Plantae
- Clade: Tracheophytes
- Clade: Angiosperms
- Clade: Eudicots
- Clade: Asterids
- Order: Lamiales
- Family: Plantaginaceae
- Genus: Penstemon
- Species: P. attenuatus

Binomial name
- Penstemon attenuatus Douglas ex Lindl.

= Penstemon attenuatus =

Species of flowering plant

Penstemon attenuatus is a species of flowering plant in the plantain family known by the common names sulphur penstemon and taperleaf beardtongue. It is native to the northwestern United States.

This species is a perennial herb growing up to 90 centimeters. The dark green, oppositely arranged leaves generally have smooth edges, except for var. attenuatus, which may have slightly toothed edges on its leaves. The basal leaves are up to 17 centimeters long and have petioles. Leaves higher on the stem are smaller and may clasp the stem at their bases. The tubular flowers vary in color from blue and purple to pink, yellow, or white. Each is up to 2 centimeters long. The flowers are attractive to many insects, such as bees. This species may be very similar to other Penstemon, and difficult to distinguish.

There are four ecotypes or varieties. The var. militaris, the South Idaho penstemon, is found in Idaho and Montana. The var. palustris is endemic to Oregon, only occurring in the Blue Mountains. The var. pseudoprocerus, native to Idaho, Montana, and Wyoming, is called small penstemon.

This species grows in dry meadows and moist woods. It can be found up to 3000 meters in elevation in areas receiving 30 to 64 centimeters (12 to 25 inches) of precipitation per year.

This plant may be used in landscaping and added to seed mixes used in the revegetation of rangeland.

== See also ==
List of Penstemon species
