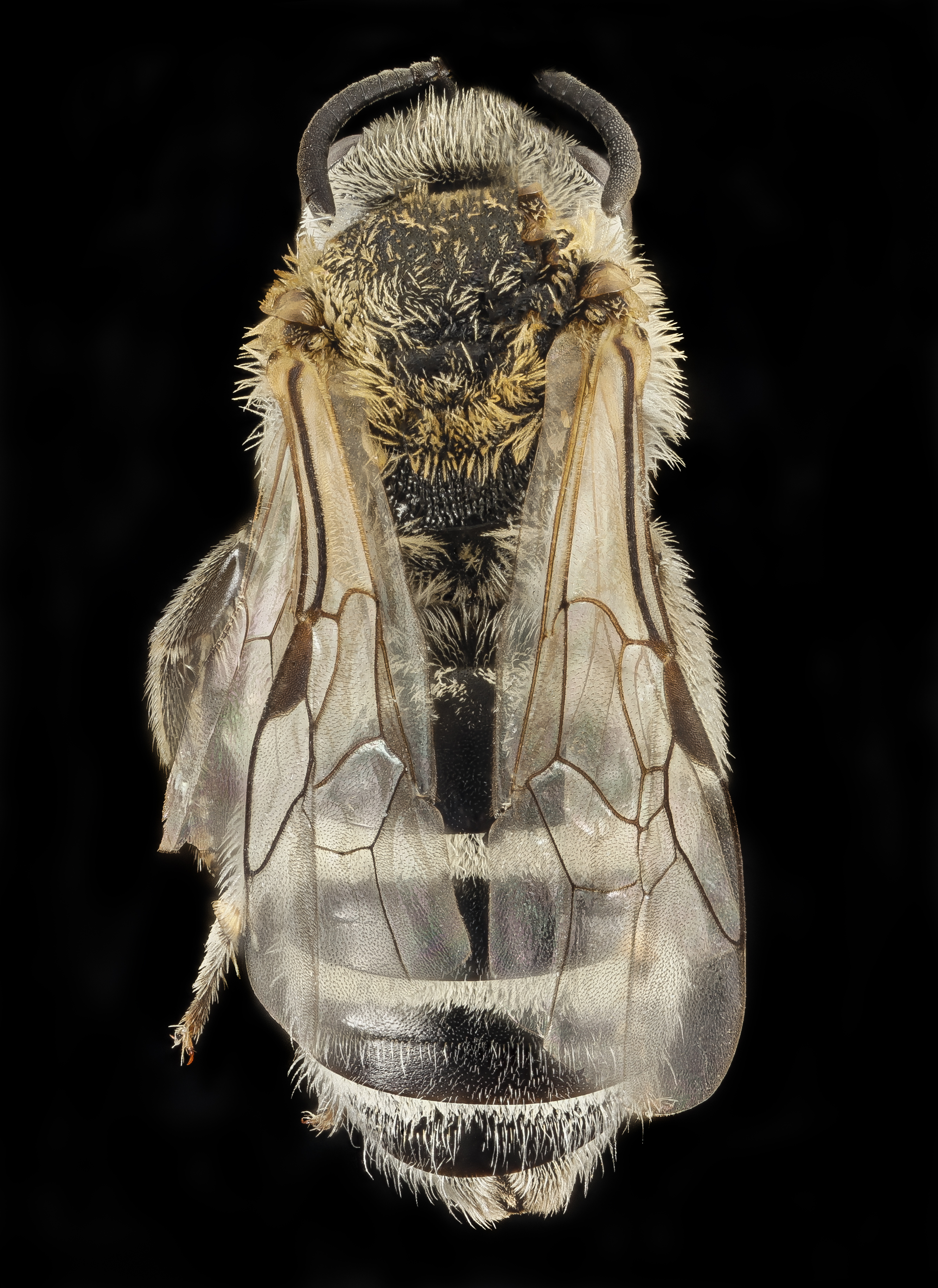

Scientific classification
- Kingdom: Animalia
- Phylum: Arthropoda
- Class: Insecta
- Order: Hymenoptera
- Family: Halictidae
- Genus: Lasioglossum
- Species: L. sisymbrii

Binomial name
- Lasioglossum sisymbrii (Cockerell, 1895)

= Lasioglossum sisymbrii =

Species of bee

Lasioglossum sisymbrii is a species of sweat bee in the family Halictidae.
