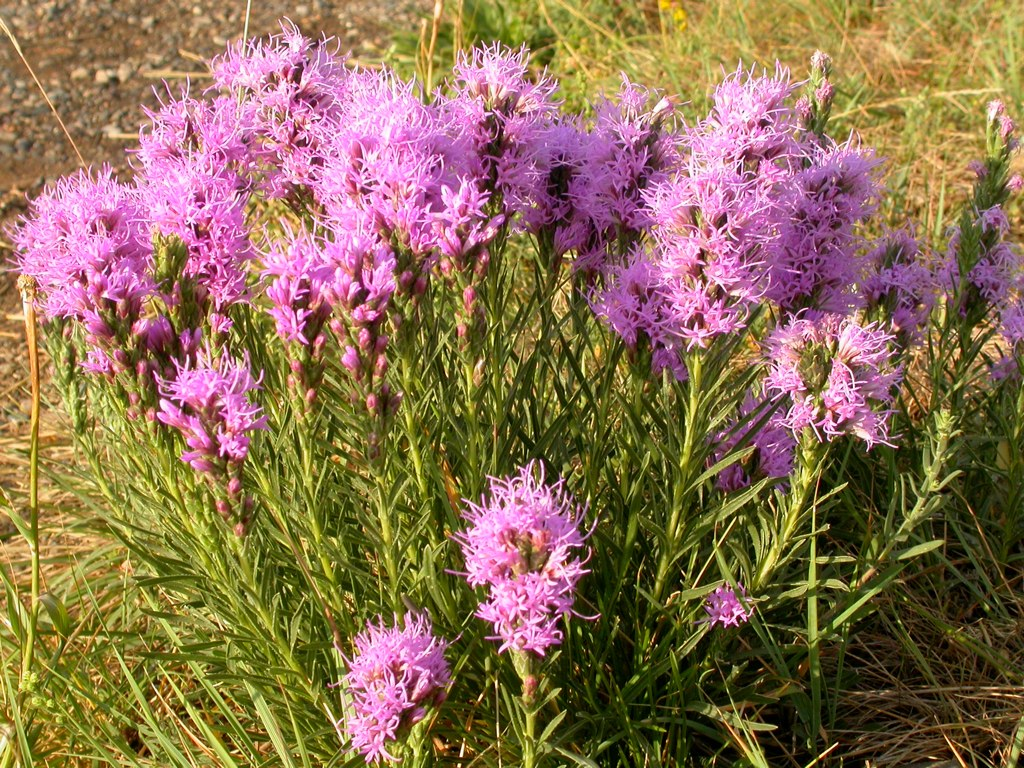

Conservation status
- Secure (NatureServe)

Scientific classification
- Kingdom: Plantae
- Clade: Tracheophytes
- Clade: Angiosperms
- Clade: Eudicots
- Clade: Asterids
- Order: Asterales
- Family: Asteraceae
- Genus: Liatris
- Species: L. punctata

Binomial name
- Liatris punctata Hook.

= Liatris punctata =

Species of flowering plant

Liatris punctata is a species of flowering plant in the family Asteraceae known by the common names dotted gayfeather, dotted blazingstar, and narrow-leaved blazingstar. It is native to North America, where it occurs throughout the plains of central Canada, the central United States, and northern Mexico.

== Description ==
L. punctata is a perennial herb producing one or more erect stems 14 to 85 centimetres (1/2 to 3 feet) tall. They grow from a thick taproot 1.3 to 5 metres (4 1/2 to 16 1/2 ft) deep that produces rhizomes. The leaves are 7.5–15 cm (3–6 in) long. Appearing from August to September, the inflorescence is a spike of several flower heads which are each about 2 cm (3/4 in) across. The heads contain several flowers which are usually purple, but sometimes white. The fruit is an achene tipped with a long pappus of feathery bristles. The plant reproduces sexually by seed and vegetatively by sprouting from its rhizome. This species is slow-growing and long-lived, with specimens estimated to be over 35 years old.

== Distribution and habitat ==
This plant occurs in Canada from Alberta to Manitoba, in most of the central United States and part of Mexico. There are three varieties, with var. punctata in western areas, var. nebraskana more common to the east, and var. mexicana in Oklahoma and Texas.

This species grows in a wide variety of habitat types, including ponderosa pine forests, sagebrush, chaparral, pinyon–juniper woodland, and many types of grassland and prairie. It is drought-tolerant because of its deep roots, but is less abundant with less water. It is also fire-tolerant, able to resprout from its rhizome and disperse its seeds via wind to soil cleared of litter by fire. On plains and prairies it grows with many types of grasses, such as Scribner's panic grass (Panicum scribnerianum) and tumble grass (Schedonnardus paniculatus), and wildflowers such as heath aster (Symphyotrichum ericoides), tick-trefoil (Desmodium sessilifolium), and oldfield goldenrod (Solidago nemoralis). It is a host plant for the hemiparasitic wholeleaf Indian paintbrush (Castilleja integra).

== Ecology ==
This plant is palatable to livestock and wild ungulates such as elk, white-tailed deer, and pronghorn. Its nectar is favored by lepidopterans, such as the rare butterfly Pawnee montane skipper (Hesperia leonardus montana), which is known to occur wherever the plant does.

== Cultivation ==
This species is listed in the U.S. Forest Service Fire Effects Information System (FEIS) as being good for revegetating prairie habitats and reclaiming mining spoil. Dotted gayfeather is highly recommended by wildflower writers such as Claude A. Barr as ornamental plant for its clear spires of purple blooms even in dry years due to its substantial water storing taproot. In climates with more moisture than its native range, it needs lime or potash additions to soil to maintain stiff, upright stems.
