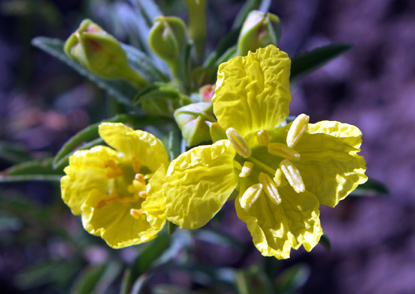

Conservation status
- Secure (NatureServe)

Scientific classification
- Kingdom: Plantae
- Clade: Tracheophytes
- Clade: Angiosperms
- Clade: Eudicots
- Clade: Rosids
- Order: Myrtales
- Family: Onagraceae
- Genus: Oenothera
- Species: O. serrulata

Binomial name
- Oenothera serrulata Nutt.

Synonyms
- List: Calylophus australis; Calylophus drummondiana; Calylophus nuttallii; Calylophus serrulata; Meriolix drummondiana; Meriolix intermedia; Meriolix oblanceolata; Meriolix serrulata; Meriolix spinulosa; Oenothera leucocarpa; Oenothera spinulosa

= Oenothera serrulata =

Plant species in the evening primrose family

Oenothera serrulata is a species of flowering plant in the Onagraceae known by the common name yellow sundrops. Other common names include halfshrub sundrop, serrate-leaved evening primrose, shrubby evening primrose, plains yellow primrose, and halfleaf sundrop. It is native to central North America, including central Canada and the central United States.

This plant is a subshrub that branches and forms a bushy clump up to 46 centimetres (18 inches) tall. The toothed leaves are up to 8.9 centimetres (3.5 inches) long. The yellow flowers bloom between March and November and have four petals. They open in the morning and close in the afternoon. They fade orange or pink with age. The fruit is a cylindrical capsule. It grows in dry, open plains and prairies.

This drought- and heat-tolerant species grows in many types of substrate, including caliche, limestone, and gypsum. The leaves turn so that their edges face the sun, an adaptation to hot conditions.

== Taxonomy ==
Oenothera serrulata was scientifically described and named by Thomas Nuttall in 1818. It is classified in the genus Oenothera within the Onagraceae family. It has no accepted subspecies or varieties, but it has 27 synonyms according to Plants of the World Online.

Table of Synonyms
Name	Year	Rank	Notes
Calylophus australis Towner & Raven	1970	species	= het.
Calylophus drummondiana Spach	1835	species	= het.
Calylophus nuttallii Spach	1835	species	≡ hom., nom. superfl.
Calylophus serrulata (Nutt.) P.H.Raven	1964	species	≡ hom.
Calylophus serrulata var. arizonicus Shinners	1964	variety	= het.
Calylophus serrulata var. spinulosus (Torr. & A.Gray) Shinners	1964	variety	= het.
Meriolix drummondiana (Spach) Small	1903	species	= het.
Meriolix intermedia Rydb.	1903	species	= het.
Meriolix oblanceolata Rydb.	1931	species	= het.
Meriolix serrulata (Nutt.) Raf.	1819	species	≡ hom.
Meriolix serrulata var. douglasii (Torr. & A.Gray) Walp.	1843	variety	= het.
Meriolix serrulata var. drummondii (Torr. & A.Gray) Walp.	1843	variety	= het.
Meriolix serrulata var. nuttallii Walp.	1843	variety	≡ hom., not validly publ.
Meriolix serrulata var. spinulosa (Torr. & A.Gray) Small	1896	variety	= het.
Meriolix spinulosa (Nutt.) A.Heller	1895	species	= het.
Oenothera leucocarpa Comien	1830	species	= het.
Oenothera serrulata var. douglasii H.Lév.	1908	variety	= het., nom. illeg.
Oenothera serrulata var. douglasii Torr. & A.Gray	1840	variety	= het.
Oenothera serrulata subsp. drummondii (Torr. & A.Gray) Munz	1965	subspecies	= het.
Oenothera serrulata var. drummondii Torr. & A.Gray	1840	variety	= het.
Oenothera serrulata f. flava Munz	1929	form	= het.
Oenothera serrulata var. integrifolia H.Lév.	1908	variety	= het.
Oenothera serrulata var. nuttallii Torr. & A.Gray	1840	variety	= het.
Oenothera serrulata var. oblanceolata (Rydb.) F.C.Gates	1939	variety	= het.
Oenothera serrulata var. spinulosa Torr. & A.Gray	1840	variety	= het.
Oenothera serrulata var. typica Munz	1929	variety	≡ hom., not validly publ.
Oenothera spinulosa Nutt.	1840	species	= het.
Notes: ≡ homotypic synonym; = heterotypic synonym
