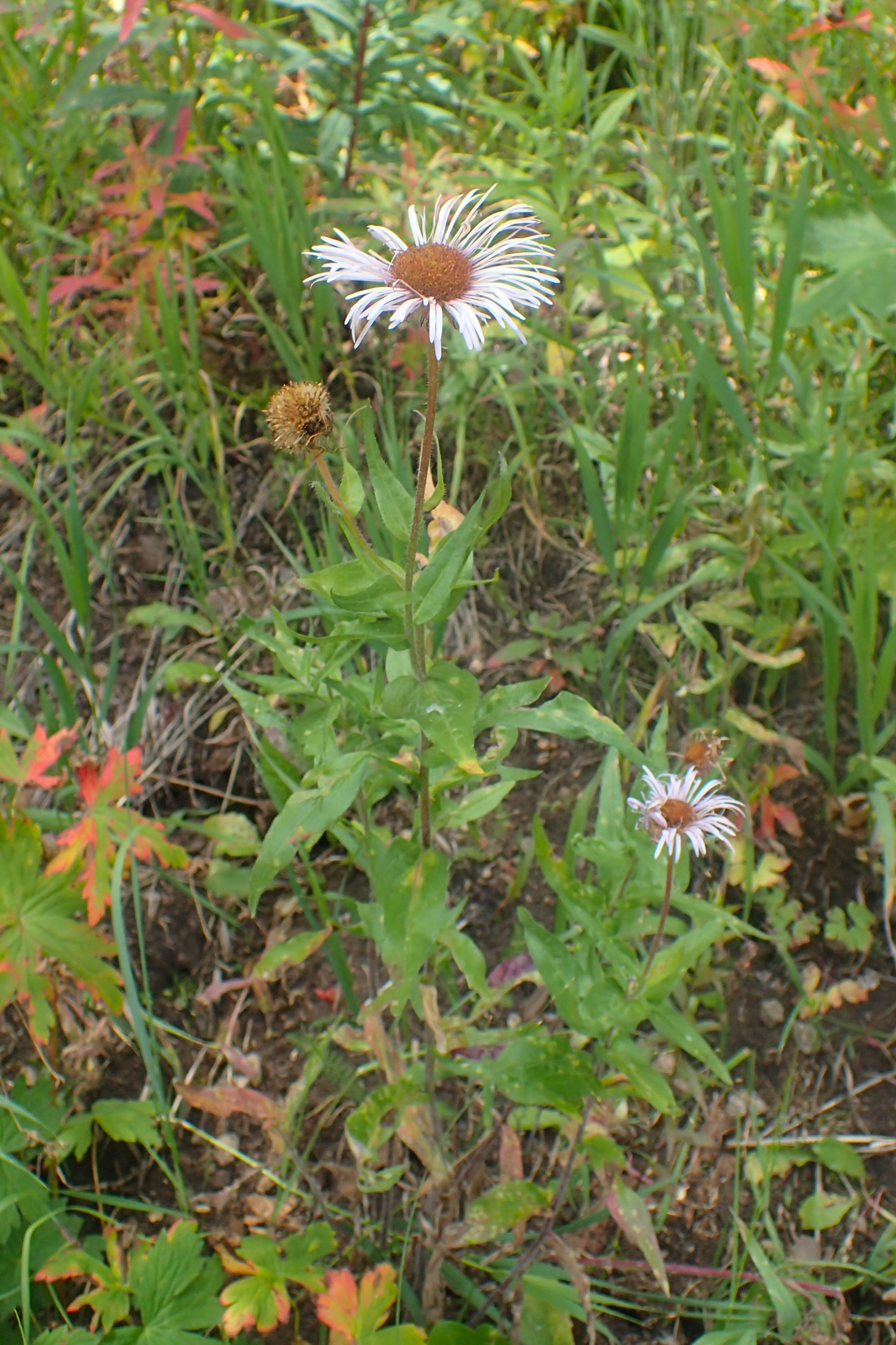
- In Colorado

Conservation status
- Apparently Secure (NatureServe)

Scientific classification
- Kingdom: Plantae
- Clade: Tracheophytes
- Clade: Angiosperms
- Clade: Eudicots
- Clade: Asterids
- Order: Asterales
- Family: Asteraceae
- Genus: Erigeron
- Species: E. elatior

Binomial name
- Erigeron elatior (A.Gray) Greene

Synonyms
- Erigeron grandiflorus var. elatior A.Gray; Erigeron grandiflorum var. elatius A.Gray

= Erigeron elatior =

Species of flowering plant

Erigeron elatior is a North American species of flowering plants in the family Asteraceae known by the common name tall fleabane.

Erigeron elatior is native to the western United States, in the states of New Mexico, Colorado, Utah, and Wyoming. It grows in subalpine brush, mountain meadows, and openings in coniferous forests.

Erigeron elatior is a perennial herb up to 60 centimeters (2 feet) in height, spreading by means of woody underground rhizomes. It produces 1-6 flower heads per stem, each head with 75–150 pink, white, or rose-purple ray florets surrounding numerous yellow disc florets.
