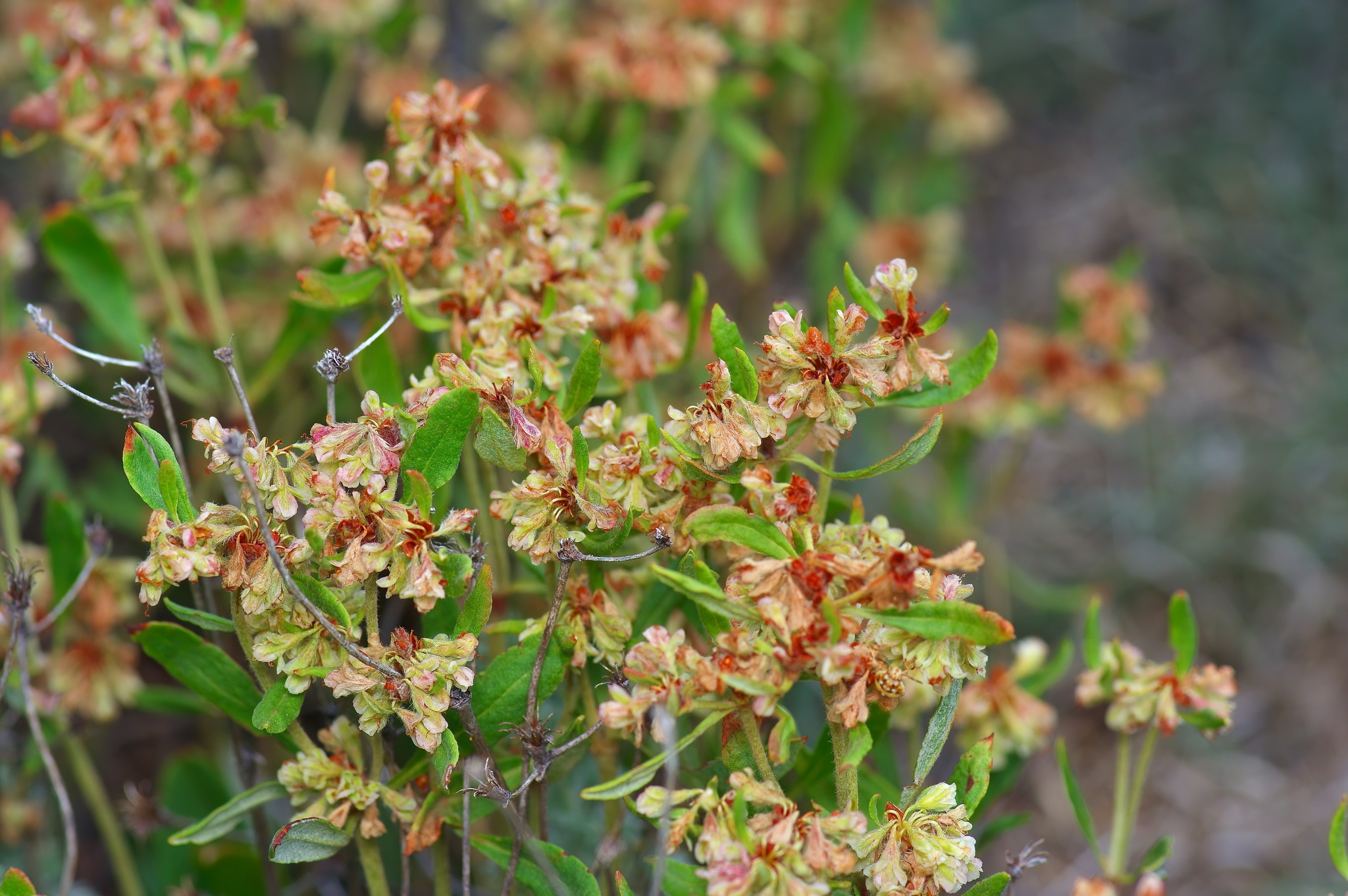

Conservation status
- Secure (NatureServe)

Scientific classification
- Kingdom: Plantae
- Clade: Embryophytes
- Clade: Tracheophytes
- Clade: Angiosperms
- Clade: Eudicots
- Order: Caryophyllales
- Family: Polygonaceae
- Genus: Eriogonum
- Species: E. jamesii

Binomial name
- Eriogonum jamesii Benth.

Varieties
- E. j. var. higginsii; E. j. var. jamesii; E. j. var. simplex; E. j. var. undulatum

Synonyms
- Eriogonum jamiesonii; Eriogonum sericeum; Eriogonum undulatum

= Eriogonum jamesii =

Species of wild buckwheat

Eriogonum jamesii is a species of wild buckwheat known by the common name James' buckwheat and antelope sage. It is native to the southwestern United States, being found in: Colorado, Utah, Arizona, Texas, New Mexico, Oklahoma, and Nebraska.

== Taxonomy ==
Eriogonum jamesii was scientifically described and named by George Bentham in 1856. It is classified in the Eriogonum as part of the Polygonaceae family. It has four accepted varieties according to Plants of the World Online.

- Eriogonum jamesii var. higginsii – Endemic to Utah
- Eriogonum jamesii var. jamesii – Native to Arizona, Colorado, New Mexico, Oklahoma, Texas, and Sonora
- Eriogonum jamesii var. simplex – Endemic to Kansas
- Eriogonum jamesii var. undulatum – Native to southwestern US and northern Mexico

Eriogonum jamesii has a total of six synonyms between the species and varieties jamesii and undulatum.

Table of Synonyms
Name	Year	Rank	Synonym of:	Notes
Eriogonum jamesii var. neomexicanum Gand.	1906	variety	var. jamesii	= het.
Eriogonum jamesii subsp. typicum S.Stokes	1936	subspecies	E. jamesii	≡ hom., not validly publ.
Eriogonum jamesii subsp. undulatum (Benth.) S.Stokes	1936	subspecies	var. undulatum	≡ hom.
Eriogonum jamiesonii Ingw.	1934	species	var. jamesii	= het.
Eriogonum sericeum Torr. & A.Gray	1870	species	var. jamesii	= het.
Eriogonum undulatum Benth.	1856	species	var. undulatum	≡ hom.
Notes: ≡ homotypic synonym; = heterotypic synonym

== Uses ==
The Navajo people have used Eriogonum jamesii as an oral contraceptive. Among the Zuni people, the root is soaked in water and used as a wash for sore eyes. The fresh or dried root is also eaten for stomachaches. The root is carried in the mouth for a sore tongue and then buried in a river bottom. The ground blossom powder is given to ceremonial dancers impersonating anthropic gods to bring rain.
