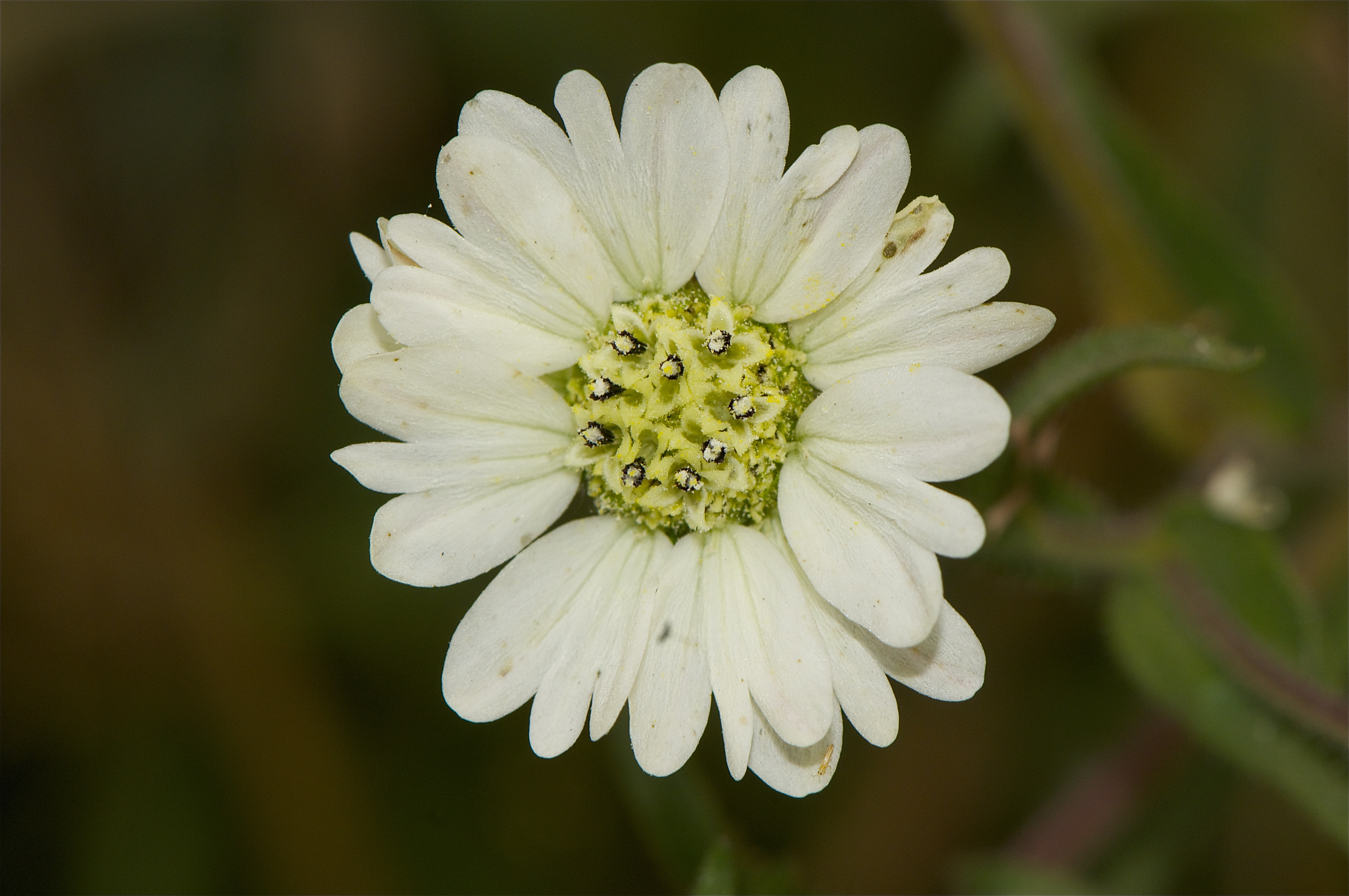
- Hemizonia congesta

Scientific classification
- Kingdom: Plantae
- Clade: Tracheophytes
- Clade: Angiosperms
- Clade: Eudicots
- Clade: Asterids
- Order: Asterales
- Family: Asteraceae
- Subfamily: Asteroideae
- Tribe: Madieae
- Subtribe: Madiinae
- Genus: Hemizonia; DC

Species
- About 25, see text

= Hemizonia =

Genus of flowering plants

Hemizonia is a genus of plants in the family Asteraceae. They are known generally as tarweeds, although some tarweeds belong to other genera, such as Madia and Deinandra. Furthermore, Hemizonia is currently being revised; some species may be segregated into new genera.

== Range ==
The Hemizonia tarweeds are native to southwestern North America, especially California.

== Description ==
Hemizonia are usually sticky, aromatic, yellow-flowered annual plants which are hardy and competitive, especially in the dry Mediterranean climate of California.

== Selected species ==
- Hemizonia arida — Red Rock tarweed
- Hemizonia clementina — Catalina tarweed; Santa Catalina Island, Channel Islands
- Hemizonia congesta — hayfield tarweed; Central Valley (California), California Coast Ranges, SW Oregon
- Hemizonia conjugens—Deinandra conjugens — Otay tarweed; Otay Mesa area, San Diego.
- Hemizonia fasciculata—Deinandra fasciculata — clustered tarweed; Santa Monica Mountains.
- Hemizonia fitchii — Fitch's tarweed
- Hemizonia floribunda — Tecate tarweed
- Hemizonia frutescens
- Hemizonia greeneana
- Hemizonia increscens—Deinandra increscens — grassland tarweed; coastal California and & Channel Islands
- Hemizonia kelloggii — Kellogg's tarweed
- Hemizonia lobbii — threeray tarweed
- Hemizonia minthornii—Deinandra minthornii — Santa Susana tarweed; Simi Hills, Santa Susana Mountains, and Santa Monica Mountains chaparral. State and CNPS listed vulnerable species.
- Hemizonia mohavensis—Deinandra mohavensis — Mojave tarweed; west Mojave Desert, Transverse Ranges, northern Peninsular Ranges
- Hemizonia palmeri
- Hemizonia paniculata — San Diego tarweed
- Hemizonia pungens — common tarweed
- Hemizonia streetsii
