= Slender tarweed =

Slender tarweed is a common name for several plants and may refer to:

- Deinandra fasciculata, native to western North America
- Madia gracilis
- Madia subspicata
