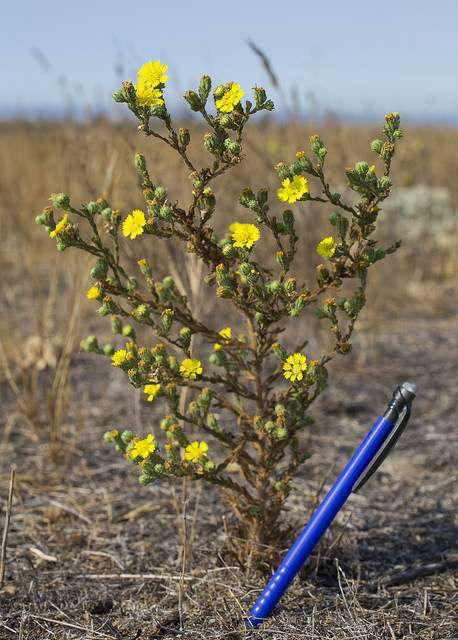

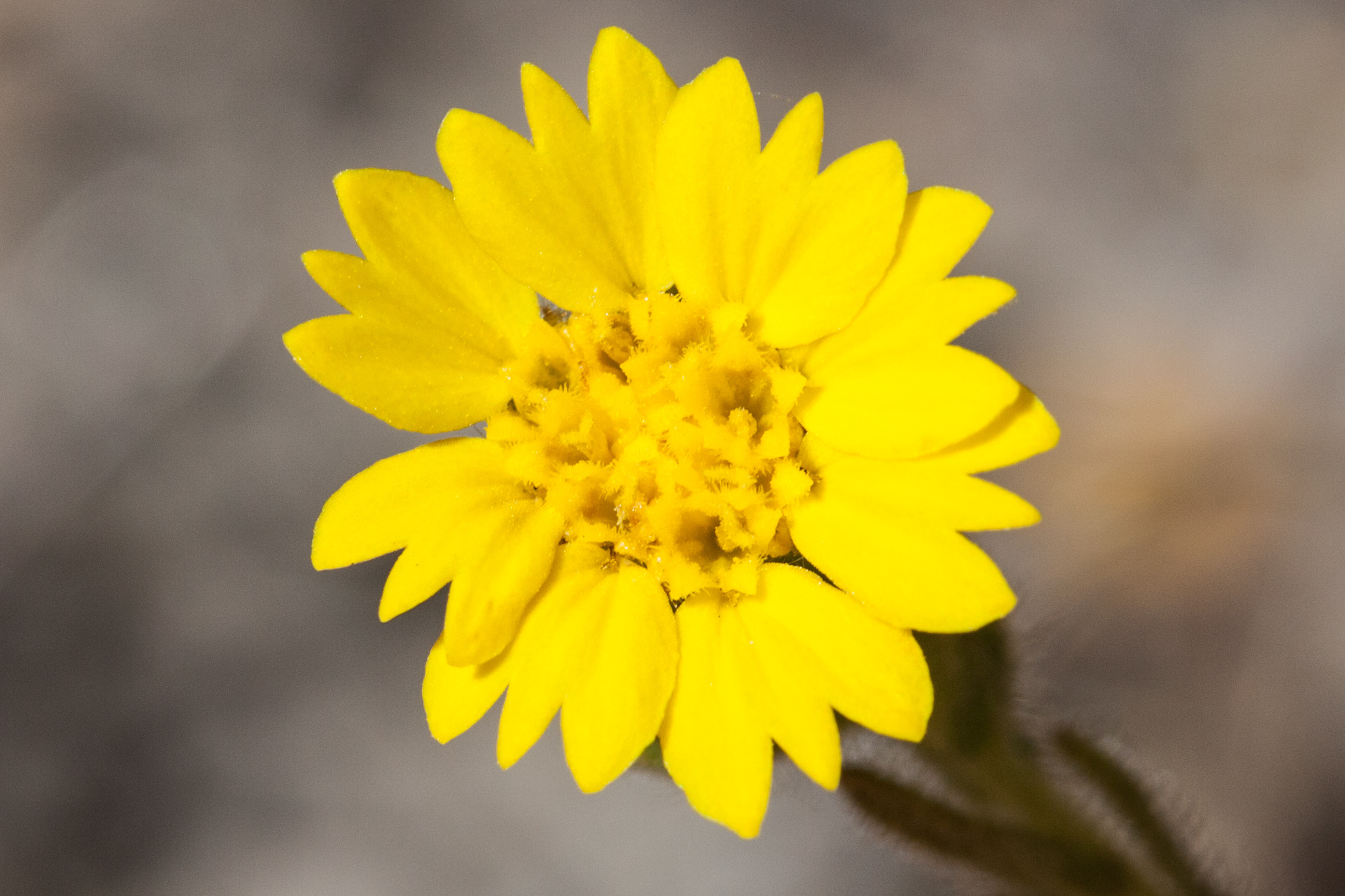

Conservation status
- Critically Imperiled (NatureServe)

Scientific classification
- Kingdom: Plantae
- Clade: Embryophytes
- Clade: Tracheophytes
- Clade: Spermatophytes
- Clade: Angiosperms
- Clade: Eudicots
- Clade: Asterids
- Order: Asterales
- Family: Asteraceae
- Genus: Deinandra
- Species: D. bacigalupii

Binomial name
- Deinandra bacigalupii B.G.Baldwin

= Deinandra bacigalupii =

Species of flowering plant

Deinandra bacigalupii is a rare species of flowering plant in the family Asteraceae, known by the common names Livermore tarplant and Livermore moonshine. It is endemic to Alameda County, California, and is only found within a half-mile of the city limits of Livermore, in the eastern portion of the Livermore Valley. The plant is considered endangered under the California Endangered Species Act, and there are only four known populations; a fifth was destroyed by a landscaping business in 2014. The majority is located on city property near the Springtown neighborhood. It grows in open areas with alkali soils, in alkali meadows and on the edges of alkali sinks, and appears to be restricted to a soil called Solano fine sandy loam. This plant was previously included within Deinandra increscens ssp. increscens, but it was separated and elevated to species level in 1999.

This is an annual herb producing a solid stem 10 to 40 centimetres (4 to 16 in) tall. The hairy, glandular leaves have narrow linear or lance-shaped blades with smooth or lobed edges. The inflorescence is a cluster of flower heads each surrounded by the upper bracts on the stem branches. The head contains 6 to 9 lobed yellow ray florets, each a few millimeters long, and several yellow disc florets with yellow or brown anthers. The plant has sticky glands, giving it a strong odor, which has been described as that of paint thinner. It blooms between June and October, after most other plants in the area have died.

Scientists think the plant diverged from its most recent ancestor in the more recent Pliocene, in the same valley it occupies today. It is likely the host for an unidentified species of moth in the genus Heliothodes.

== Discovery and etymology ==
The species was proposed by Bruce G. Baldwin in 1999. The plant's Latin name is for the American botanist Rimo Bacigalupi (1901–1996), first curator of the Jepson herbarium, who annotated the holotype of the species in 1967 with the note "Does not seem to match any thus far published species of Hemizonia."

== Endangered species listing ==
The plant was petitioned to be listed under the California Endangered Species Act in 2014 by Heath Bartosh: at the time, California had not listed an endangered plant since 2007, and had only listed six total in the 21st century. This was critical because the federal Endangered Species Act, unlike the California act, provides much weaker protection for plants than animals: federally endangered plants are only protected on federal property. Supporters considered it to be a template for the listing of many more similarly rare plants in California. The plant was listed as an endangered species by the California Fish and Game Commission on 25 August 2016, and six months later Livermore declared it to be the official city flower.

== Gallery ==
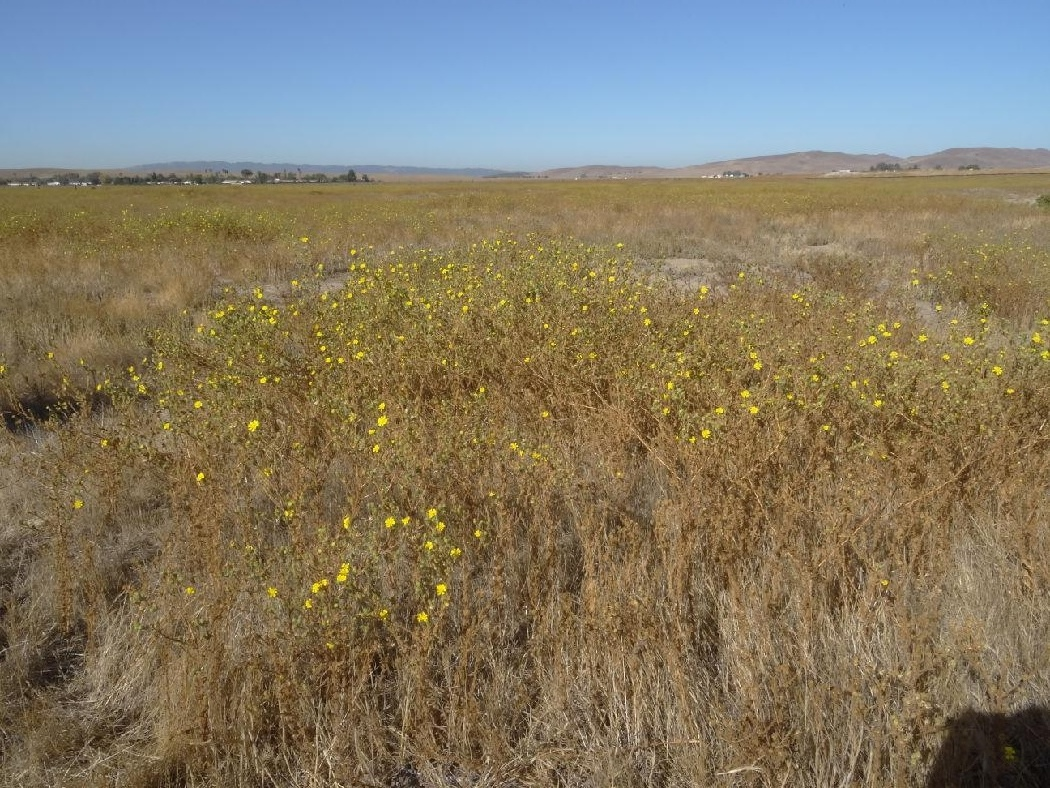
Deinandra bacigalupii near Springtown, Livermore

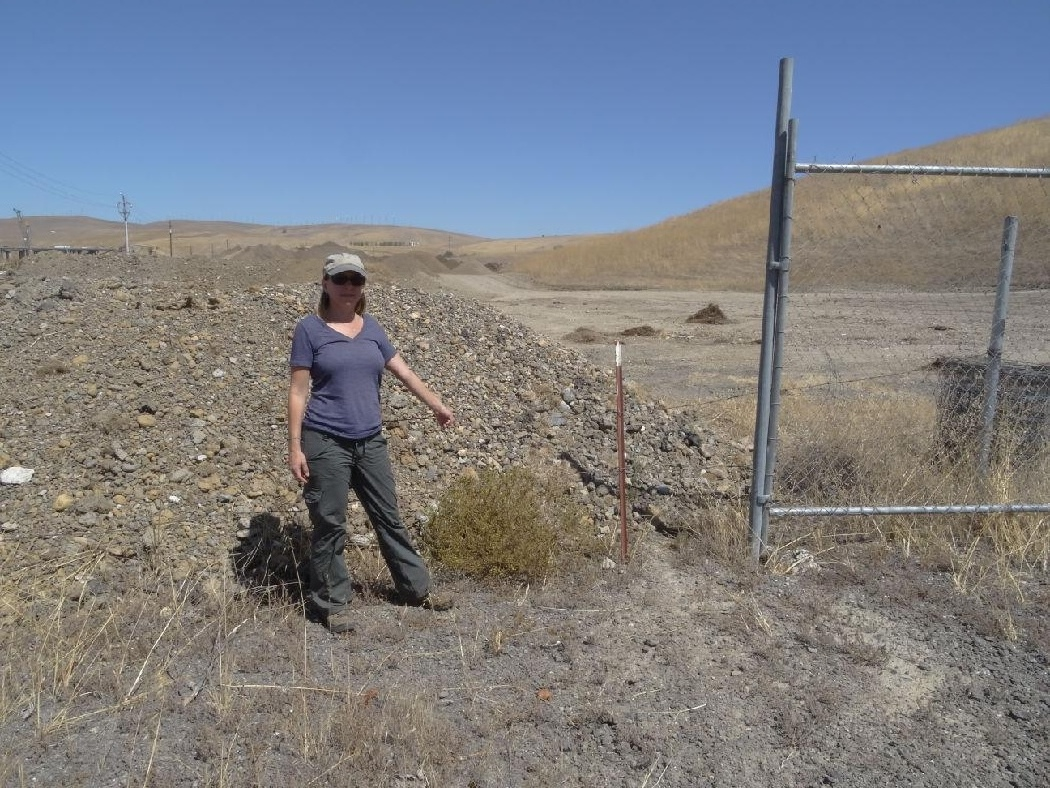
Smaller example of a Livermore tarplant near Greenville Road, Livermore

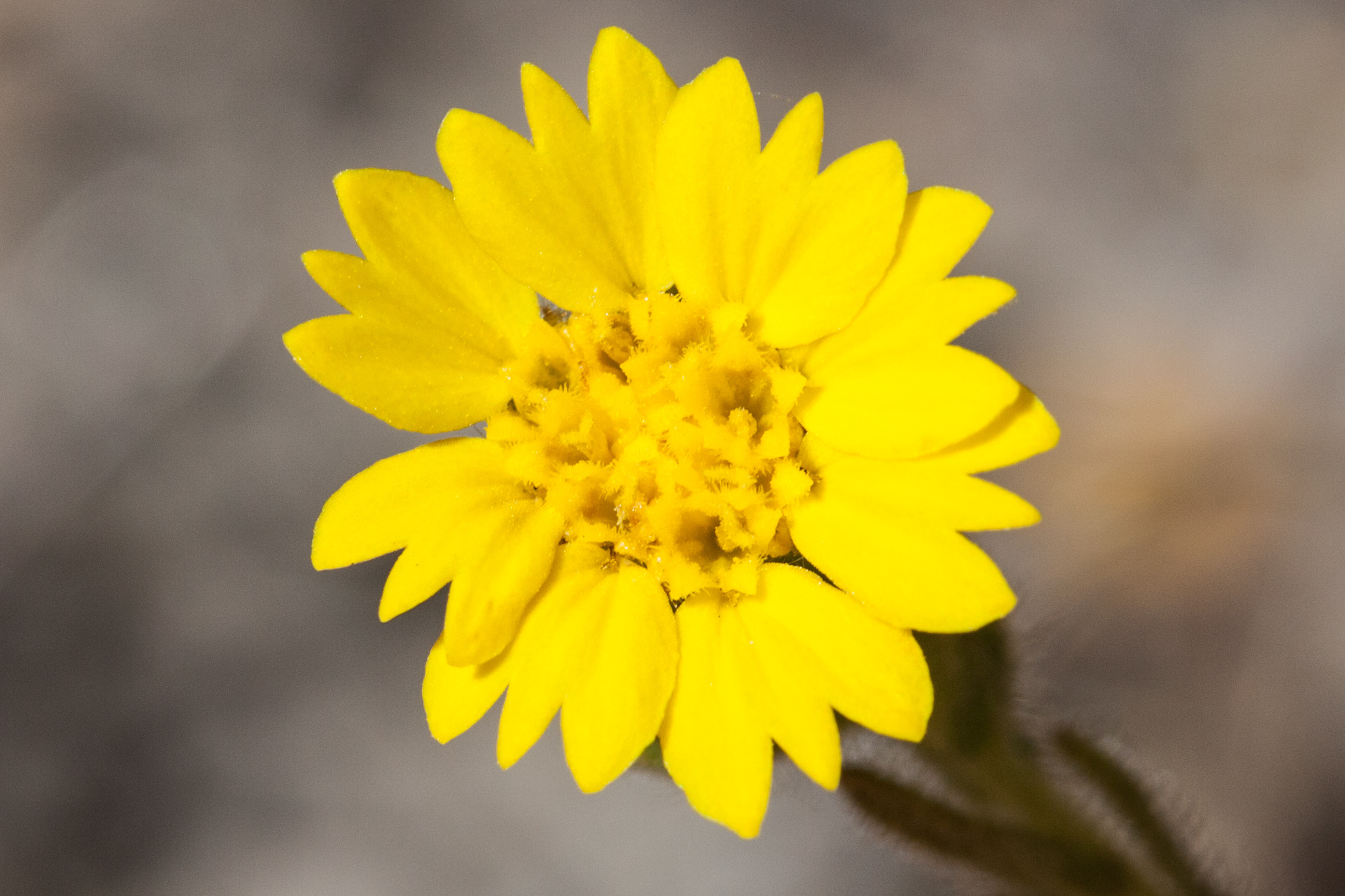
Closeup of flower
