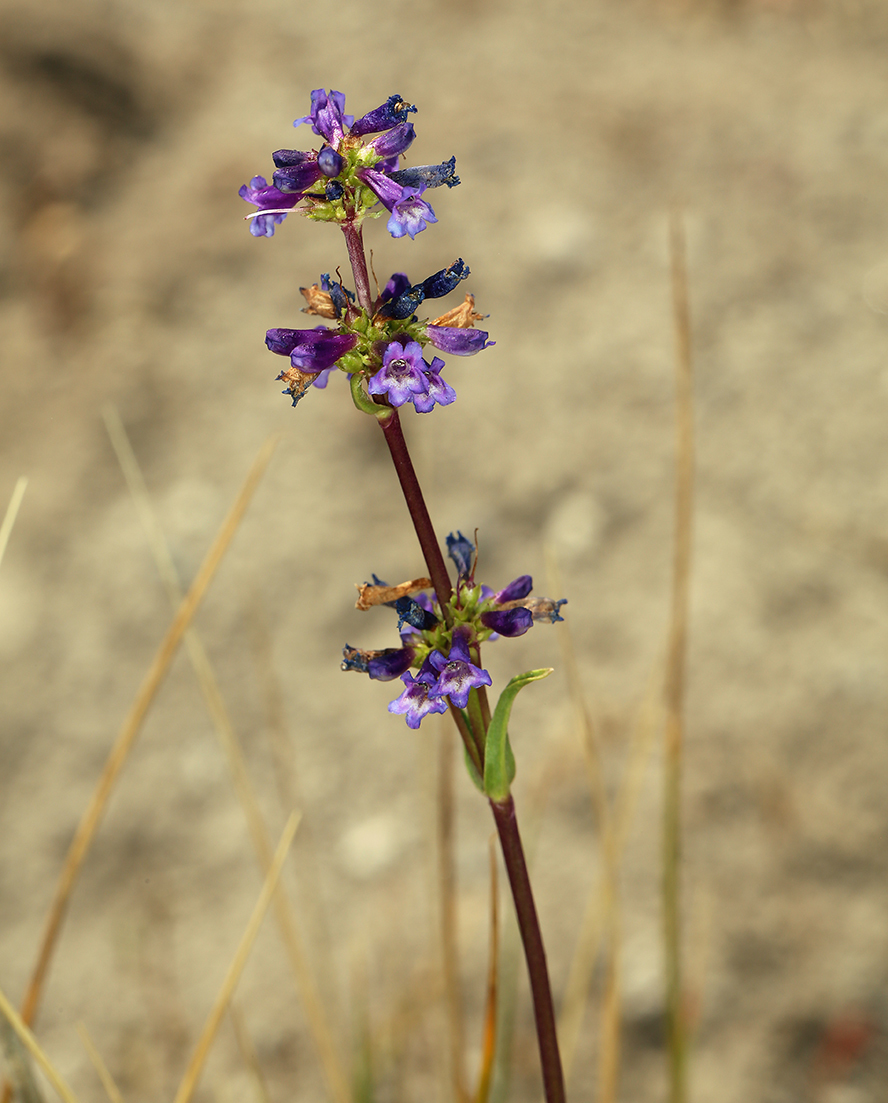
- Flowering in Mono County, California

Conservation status
- Apparently Secure (NatureServe)

Scientific classification
- Kingdom: Plantae
- Clade: Tracheophytes
- Clade: Angiosperms
- Clade: Eudicots
- Clade: Asterids
- Order: Lamiales
- Family: Plantaginaceae
- Genus: Penstemon
- Species: P. cinicola

Binomial name
- Penstemon cinicola D.D.Keck

Synonyms
- List: Penstemon truncatus Pennell; Penstemon truncatus f. puberulus Pennell

= Penstemon cinicola =

Plant species in the plantain family

Penstemon cinicola is a species of penstemon known by the common name ash penstemon. It is native to northeastern California and southern Oregon, where it grows in forests and plateau habitat.

== Description ==
Penstemon cinicola is a herbaceous plant with ascending stems, ones that curve from their base to grow upwards, that usually are 10 to 40 centimeters (4 to 16 in) tall at maturity, but occasionally may be just 8 cm (3 in). The stems may be covered in backwards facing hairs or be smooth, but are not waxy.

Generally all the leaves are cauline, attached to the stems rather than to the base of the plant. When present the basal leaves vary in length from 1 to 6.5 centimeters (1/2 to 2 1/2 in), but are usually shorter than 4 cm (1 1/2 in), and just 1 to 6 millimeters wide. They are linear, skinny with parallel sides like a grass blade, with smooth edges and folded along the length, and curved backwards towards the stems.

The inflorescence produces tubular flowers with wide lipped mouths. The inflorecnce is at the top of each stem and may be 1 to 14 centimeters (1/2 to 5 1/2 in) long. Usually it will be hairless, but may lightly hairy where the bracts and flowers attach to the main stem. It may just have one group of flowers, but more often has two to six groups with paired cymes. Each cyme will have one to seven flowers, though usually at least three. The flowers are blue-purple in color and hairless other than the bottom inside the floral tube. The length of the flower most often is 7–9 millimeters, but may occasionally be as long as 11 mm. The staminode is covered in yellow hairs, is 4–6 mm long and does not extend out of the flower opening.

== Taxonomy ==
The botanist David D. Keck published the first scientific description and named Penstemon cinicola in 1940. It has two heterotypic synonyms.

=== Names ===
In English Penstemon cinicola is known by the common name ash penstemon.

== Range and habitat ==
The native range of Penstemon cinicola is in northern California and Oregon. In Oregon it grows on the eastern side of the Cascades in Crook, Deschutes, Douglas, Klamath, and Lake counties. In California it may be found in the Warner Mountains and Modoc Plateau in Modoc, Shasta, Lassen, Siskiyou, and Tehama counties. The area of its range is uncertain, 250–20,000 square kilometers.

Its habitat is dry volcanic soils. It is associated with breaks and openings in Ponderosa pine forests and lodgepole pine forests. They also are found in the sagebrush steppe. The estimated number of populations within its range is 21 to 80.

=== Conservation ===
Penstemon cinicola was evaluated by NatureServe in 1994 and rated as apparently secure (G4). At the state level they also rate it as apparently secure (S4) in Oregon, but vulnerable (S3) in California. It is impacted by the conversion of wild areas to settlements and by logging.

== See also ==
- List of Penstemon species
