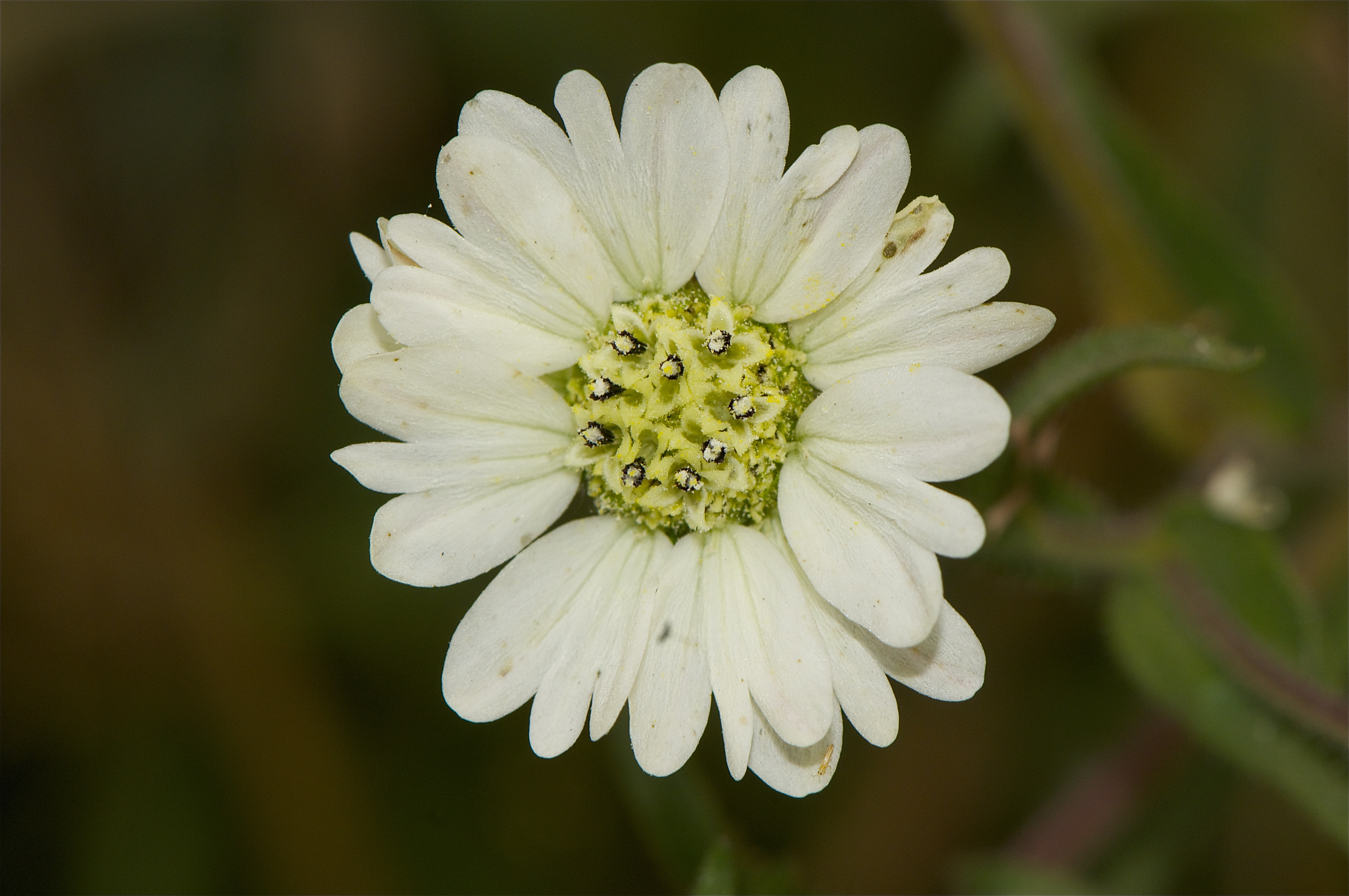

Conservation status
- Secure (NatureServe)

Scientific classification
- Kingdom: Plantae
- Clade: Tracheophytes
- Clade: Angiosperms
- Clade: Eudicots
- Clade: Asterids
- Order: Asterales
- Family: Asteraceae
- Genus: Hemizonia
- Species: H. congesta

Binomial name
- Hemizonia congesta DC.

= Hemizonia congesta =

Species of flowering plant

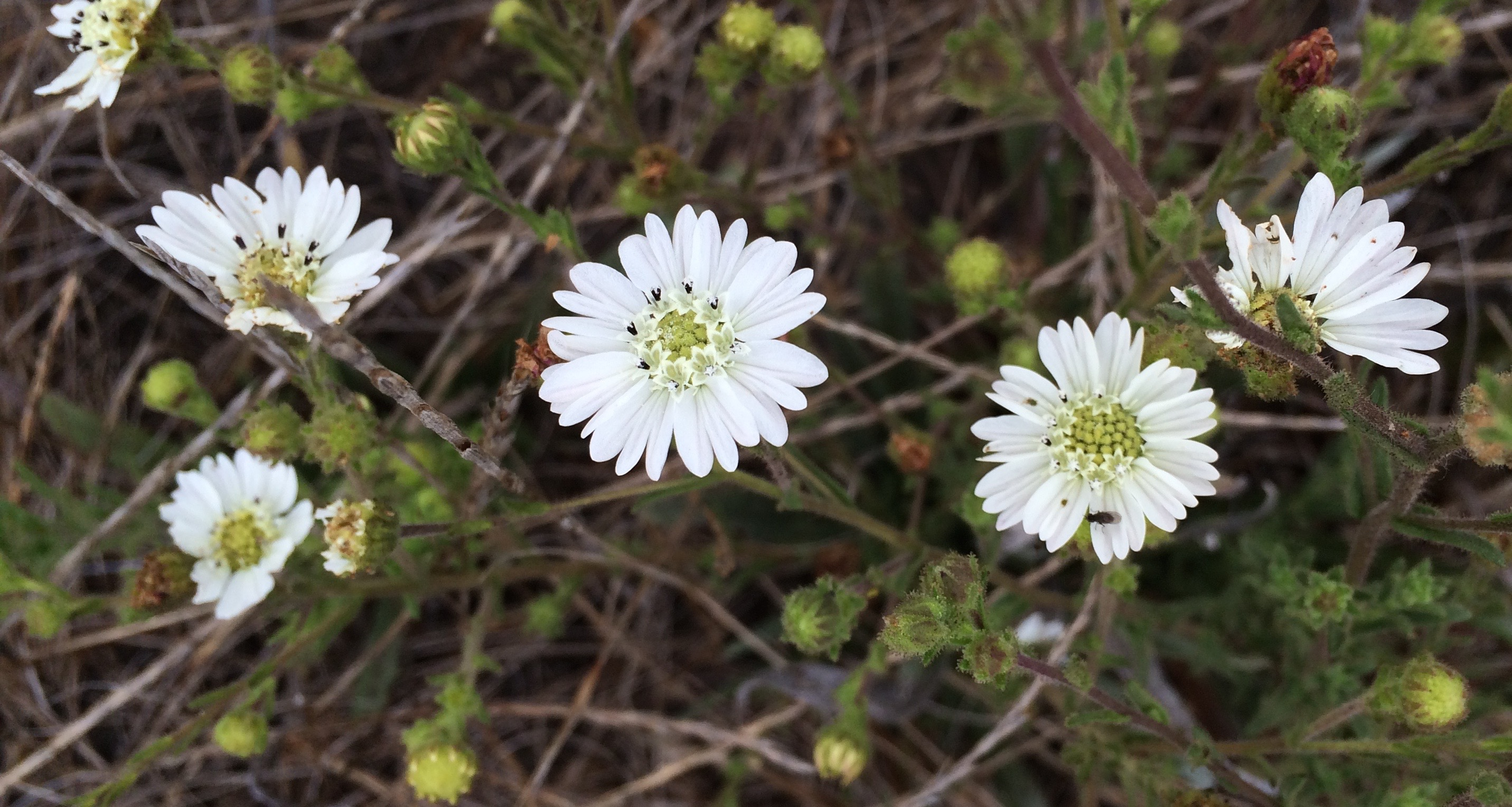
Hemizonia congesta ssp. luzulifolia, Estero Bluffs State Park.

Hemizonia congesta, known by the common name hayfield tarweed, is a species of flowering plant in the family Asteraceae, native to western North America.

== Description ==
Hemizonia congesta is a spindly, thin-stemmed annual herb growing erect to 10–80 centimetres (3.9–31.5 in) in height. Like other tarweeds the stem and foliage are glandular and have an odor reminiscent of tar. Most of the long, narrow, pointed leaves are located on the lower portion of the stem below the branching flower stalks.

The inflorescences are covered in glandular hairs and hold daisy-like flower heads. Each head has a center of yellowish dark-tipped disc florets and a fringe of bright yellow to white ray florets, often with purplish striping on the undersides. The ray florets are toothed or lobed on the tips, with the middle tooth thinner than the others.

=== Subspecies ===
There are many Hemizonia congesta subspecies, which can vary in appearance. They include:

- Hemizonia congesta subsp. calyculata — Mendocino tarplant
- Hemizonia congesta subsp. clevelandii
- Hemizonia congesta subsp. congesta
- Hemizonia congesta subsp. leucocephala — hayfield tarplant
- Hemizonia congesta subsp. luzulifolia
- Hemizonia congesta subsp. tracyi — Tracy's tarplant

== Distribution and habitat ==
Hemizonia congesta is native to California and Oregon, where it is a common member of the flora of a number of habitats, particularly in grasslands and fields. It is a native plant in the Central Valley (California), and the California Coast Ranges.

== See also ==
- Deinandra — the genus many other Hemizonia species were reclassified within.
