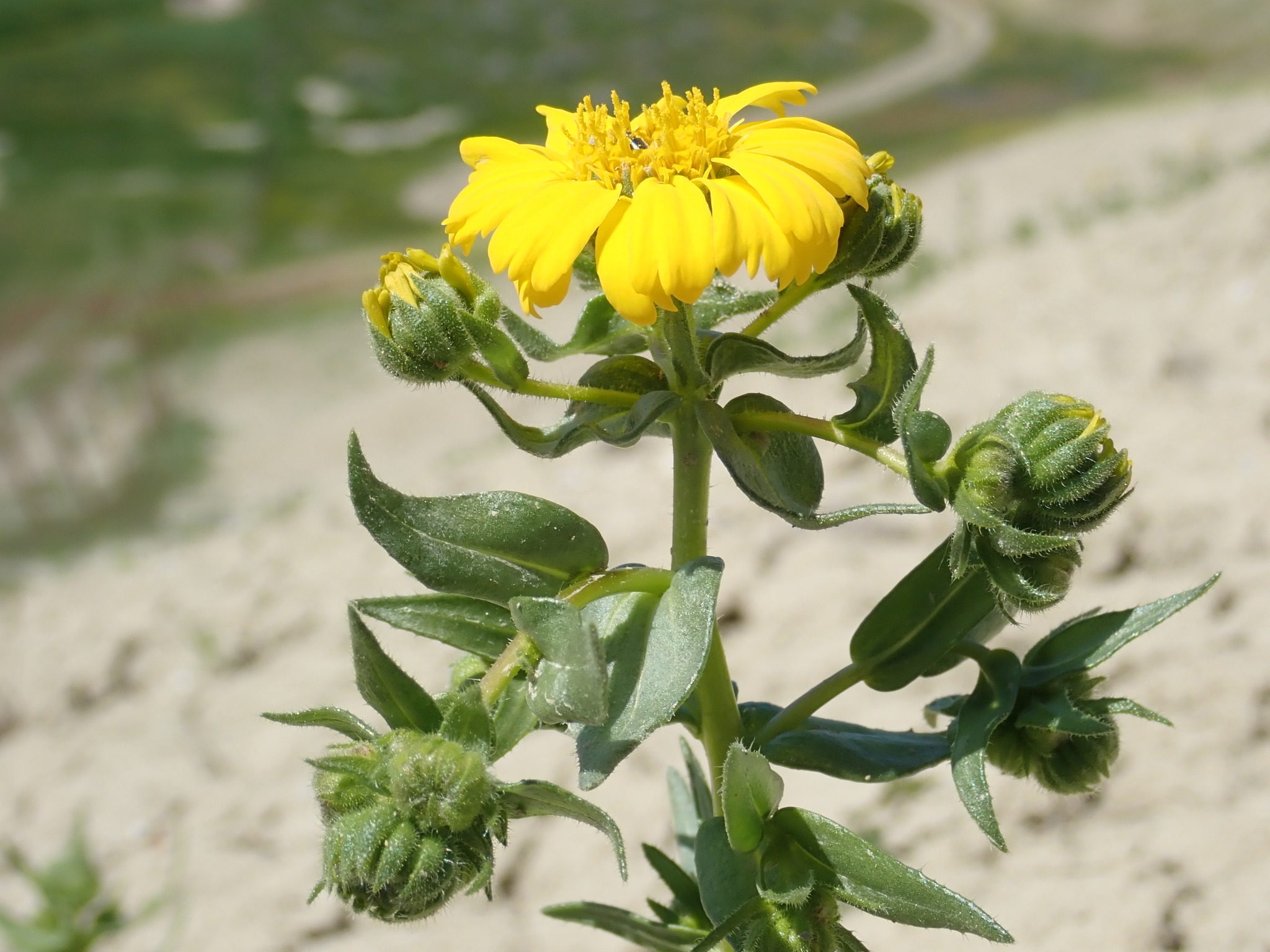

Scientific classification
- Kingdom: Plantae
- Clade: Tracheophytes
- Clade: Angiosperms
- Clade: Eudicots
- Clade: Asterids
- Order: Asterales
- Family: Asteraceae
- Genus: Deinandra
- Species: D. halliana

Binomial name
- Deinandra halliana (D.D.Keck) B.G.Baldwin

Synonyms
- Hemizonia halliana D.D.Keck

= Deinandra halliana =

Species of flowering plant

Deinandra halliana, Hall's tarplant, is a California species of plants in the tribe Madieae within the family Asteraceae. It has been found in the Coast Ranges of Central California, in Monterey, Fresno, San Benito, and San Luis Obispo Counties.

Deinandra halliana is an annual herb up to 120 cm (4 feet) tall. It produces numerous flower heads in an open array, each head containing 8-14 yellow ray florets and as many as 60 disc florets with yellow corollas but yellow or brown anthers.
