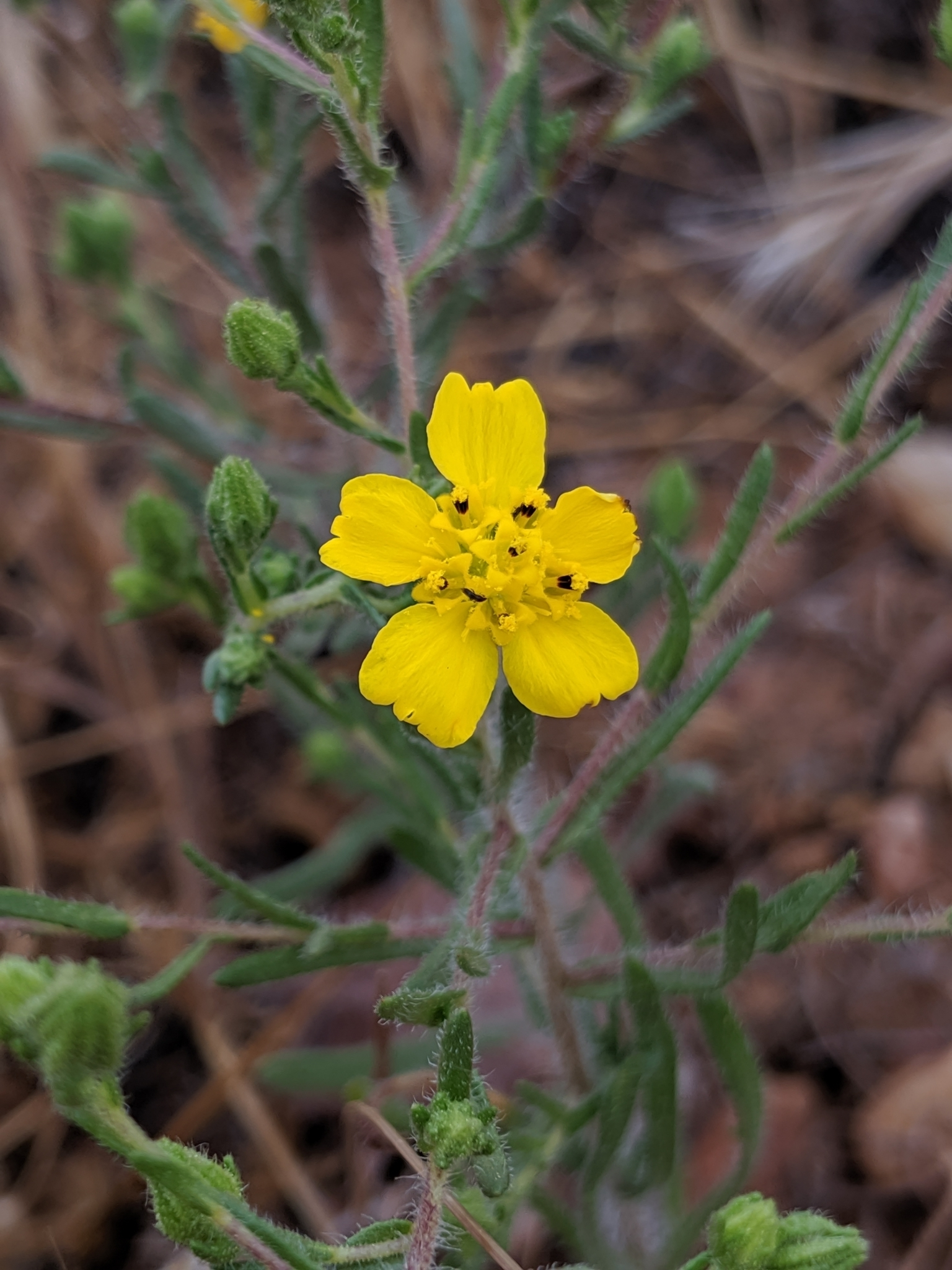

Scientific classification
- Kingdom: Plantae
- Clade: Tracheophytes
- Clade: Angiosperms
- Clade: Eudicots
- Clade: Asterids
- Order: Asterales
- Family: Asteraceae
- Genus: Deinandra
- Species: D. pentactis

Binomial name
- Deinandra pentactis (D.D.Keck) B.G.Baldwin

Synonyms
- Hemizonia lobbii subsp. pentactis D.D.Keck; Hemizonia pentactis (D.D.Keck) D.D.Keck

= Deinandra pentactis =

Species of flowering plant in California

Deinandra pentactis, the Salinas River tarweed, is a North American species of plants in the tribe Madieae within the family Asteraceae. It is endemic to California, found in the Coast Ranges of San Benito, Monterey, San Luis Obispo, and northern Santa Barbara Counties.

Deinandra pentactis is an annual herb up to 75 cm (30 inches) tall. It produces numerous flower heads in an open array. Each head has 5 yellow ray florets and 6 disc florets with yellow corollas but red or purple anthers.
