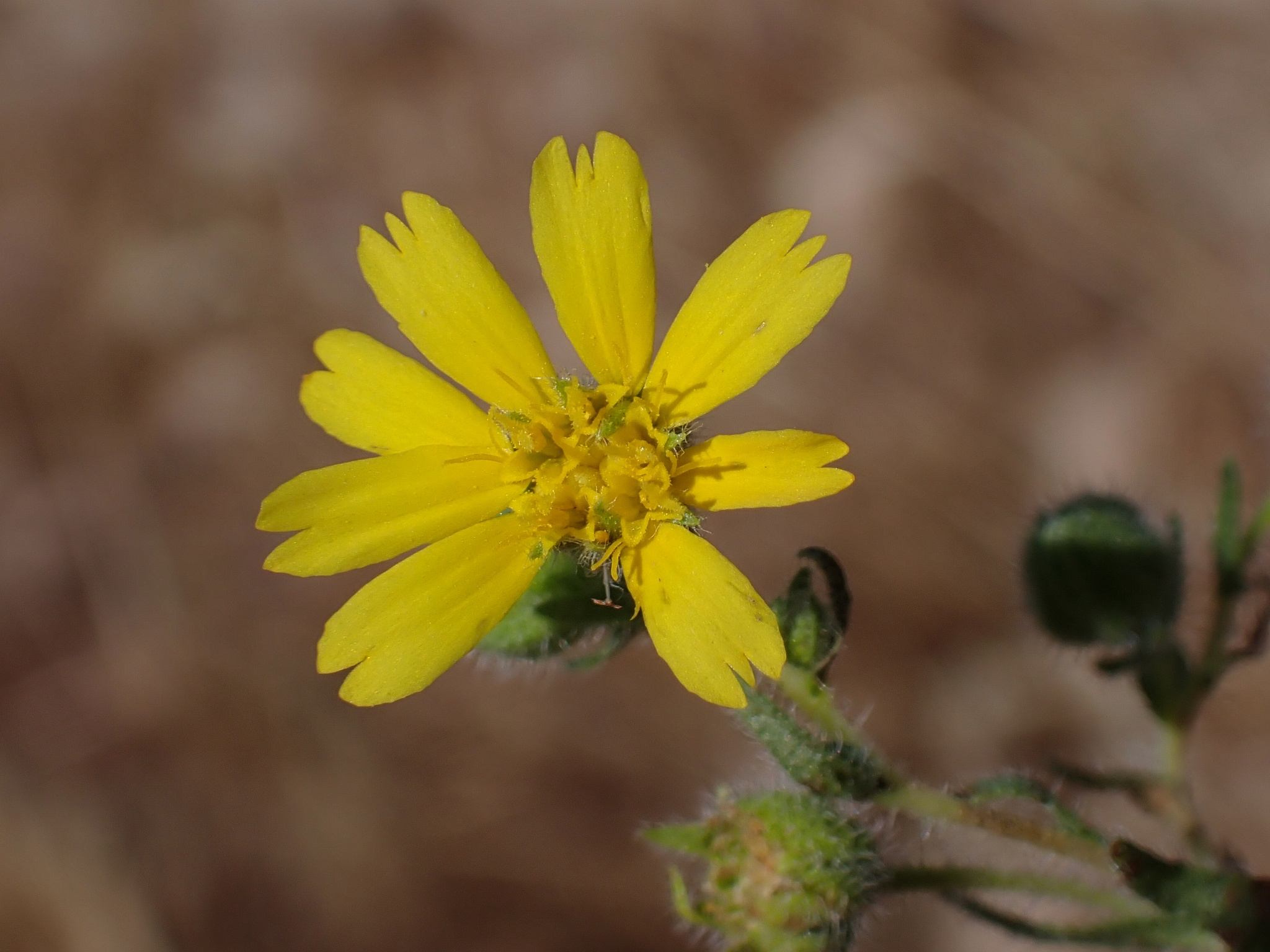

Scientific classification
- Kingdom: Plantae
- Clade: Tracheophytes
- Clade: Angiosperms
- Clade: Eudicots
- Clade: Asterids
- Order: Asterales
- Family: Asteraceae
- Genus: Deinandra
- Species: D. pallida

Binomial name
- Deinandra pallida (D.D.Keck) B.G.Baldwin

Synonyms
- Hemizonia pallida D.D.Keck

= Deinandra pallida =

Species of flowering plant

Deinandra pallida, the Kern tarweed, is a California species of plants in the tribe Madieae within the family Asteraceae. It has been found in the Coast Ranges, southern San Joaquin Valley, and Sierra Nevada foothills in Kern, Los Angeles, Santa Barbara, San Luis Obispo, Tulare, and Kings Counties. Isolated populations have been reported from further north in Tuolumne County and northwestern Fresno County.

Deinandra pallida is an annual herb up to 100 cm (40 inches) tall. It produces numerous flower heads in showy arrays, each head with 7-12 yellow ray florets and as many as 21 disc florets with yellow corollas and yellow or brown anthers.
