= Deinandra martirensis =

Scientific classification
- Kingdom: Plantae
- Clade: Tracheophytes
- Clade: Angiosperms
- Clade: Eudicots
- Clade: Asterids
- Order: Asterales
- Family: Asteraceae
- Genus: Deinandra
- Species: D. martirensis

Binomial name
- Deinandra martirensis (D.D.Keck) B.G.Baldwin

Synonyms
- Hemizonia martirensis D.D.Keck

Species of flowering plant

Deinandra martirensis is a rare North American species of plants in the tribe Madieae within the family Asteraceae.

Deinandra martirensis is native to the Baja California peninsula in northwestern Mexico. The species has been found in both of the states on the peninsula, the northern state called Baja California, and the southern state named Baja California Sur.
