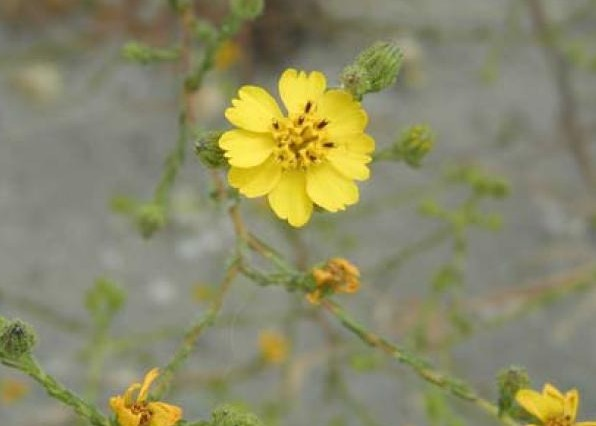

Conservation status
- Critically Imperiled (NatureServe)

Scientific classification
- Kingdom: Plantae
- Clade: Tracheophytes
- Clade: Angiosperms
- Clade: Eudicots
- Clade: Asterids
- Order: Asterales
- Family: Asteraceae
- Genus: Deinandra
- Species: D. conjugens

Binomial name
- Deinandra conjugens (D.D.Keck) B.G.Baldw.

Synonyms
- Hemizonia conjugens D.D.Keck

= Deinandra conjugens =

Species of flowering plant

Deinandra conjugens (syn. Hemizonia conjugens) is a rare species of flowering plant in the family Asteraceae known by the common names Otay tarplant and Otay tarweed. It is native to a small section of far northern Baja California in Mexico, its range extending north into San Diego County, California, in the United States. One isolated population has been reported from the hills east of Cayucos in San Luis Obispo County.

Deinandra conjugens is threatened by habitat destruction and degradation. It was federally listed as a threatened species in 1998.

== Description ==
Deinandra conjugens is an annual herb growing up to about 0.5 metres (1.6 ft) in height with a solid, bristly, gland-dotted stem. The lower leaves are hairy and lobed or toothed, and measure up to about 4.5 centimeters long.

The inflorescence is made up of one or more flower heads, sometimes with many heads in clusters. The underside of the head is covered in phyllaries with many glands. Each head has 7 to 10 yellow ray florets no more than 6 millimeters long. Most ray florets have three tiny lobes at the tips. The center of the head is filled with yellow disc florets tipped with black, dark purple or red anthers. The flowers are most often pollinated by bees.

The fruit is an achene. The achenes arising from the disc florets have pappi of white scales. Disc achenes germinate sooner than those from ray florets. Many achenes drop into the soil seed bank.

== Distribution ==
Deinandra conjugens grows in clay soils in several types of habitat, including grassland and maritime and inland coastal sage scrub. It tolerates some disturbance in its habitat, and low levels of grazing and road maintenance activities such as mowing are probably beneficial.

Most of the known occurrences of Deinandra conjugens are in San Diego County in the United States. Most of them are located in the southern part of the county in areas such as Otay Mesa and Proctor Valley. The city of San Diego has a conservation plan for this species and monitors it. There are about 34 to 37 occurrences remaining; some known occurrences are thought to have been extirpated since the plant was federally listed.

== Conservation ==
The region in which the plant lives is heavily impacted by development and other processes and exists now in a fragmented state. 70% of the plant's habitat within its range has been destroyed. Much of the territory previously threatened by development has been conserved within a number of nature reserves. Many are protected under a San Diego county ordinance. The San Diego National Wildlife Refuge created the Otay Tarplant Preserve, and Caltrans reserved a section of land for the plant near a busy highway. While many California populations are now protected, there are still many that are in danger of destruction. The status and distribution of this plant within Mexico are unknown.

Besides outright habitat destruction, the plant is affected by several processes of habitat degradation. Introduced weeds have invaded the habitat, including brome grasses (Bromus spp.), wild oats (Avena spp.), and ryegrass (Lolium perenne). Off-road vehicles are used on some land that contains the plant, and trash dumping has been known to occur. The maintenance of rural roads that lead to utility outposts may affect the land. Many occurrences are near the international border, and Border Patrol activities affect the habitat there.
