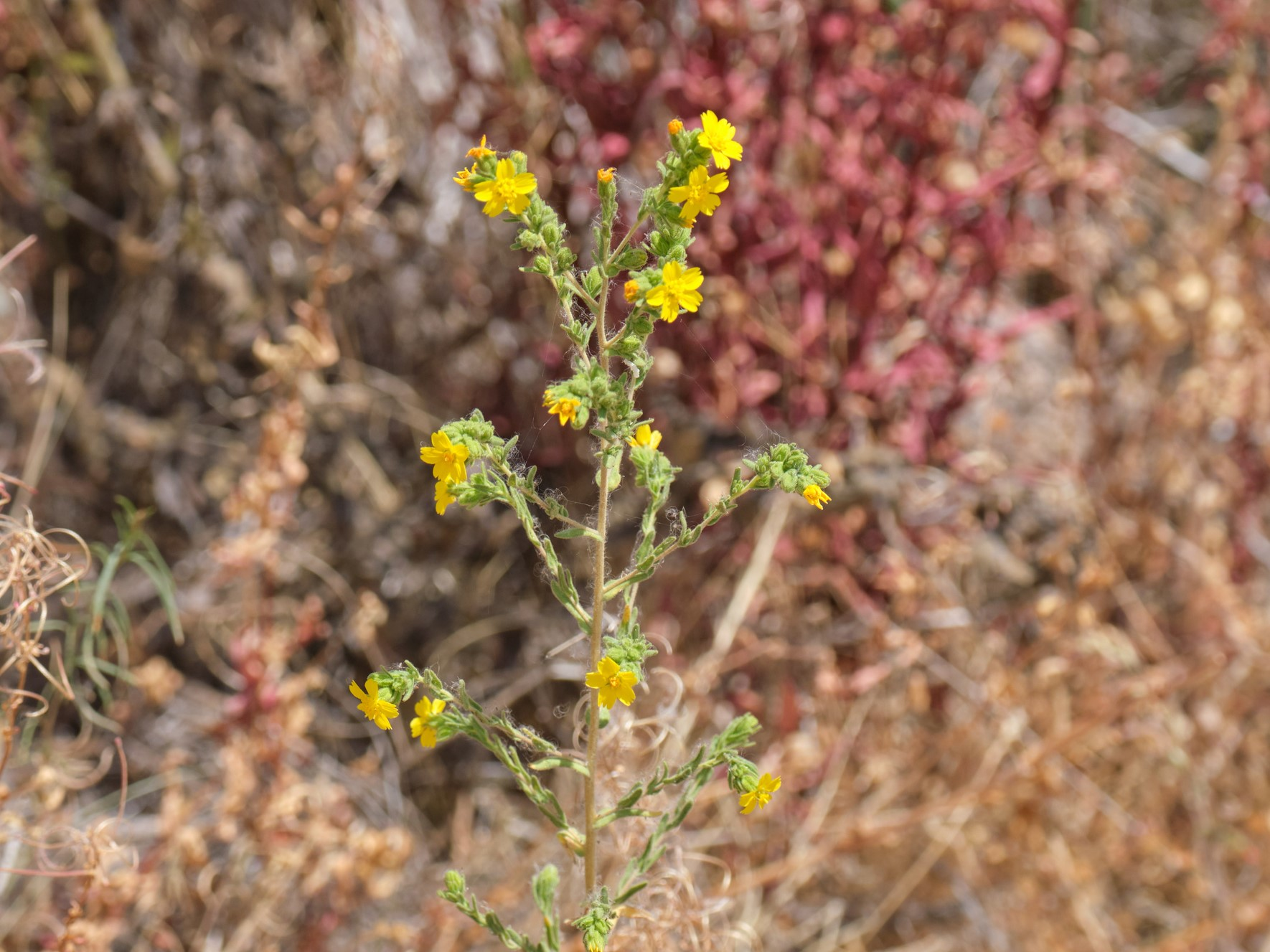

Conservation status
- Vulnerable (NatureServe)

Scientific classification
- Kingdom: Plantae
- Clade: Tracheophytes
- Clade: Angiosperms
- Clade: Eudicots
- Clade: Asterids
- Order: Asterales
- Family: Asteraceae
- Genus: Deinandra
- Species: D. mohavensis

Binomial name
- Deinandra mohavensis (D.D.Keck) B.G.Baldwin

Synonyms
- Hemizonia mohavensis D.D.Keck

= Deinandra mohavensis =

Species of flowering plant

Deinandra mohavensis, commonly known as Mojave tarplant or Mojave tarweed, is a species of flowering plant in the family Asteraceae.

== Description ==
Deinandra mohavensis is an annual herb growing 10-100 centimeters (4-40 inches) tall. The stems are hairy and glandular. The leaves are bristly and glandular and smooth-edged or serrated on the edges.

The flower heads are borne in clusters or somewhat open arrangements. The heads are lined with very glandular phyllaries. Each contains five yellow ray florets, each about half a centimeter long, and six yellow disc florets.

== Distribution and habitat ==
The plant is endemic to California. It has a disjunct distribution, occurring in the southernmost Sierra Nevada, the Mojave Desert, the Peninsular Ranges, and possibly the San Bernardino Mountains. It grows in moist areas in chaparral and riparian zone habitat.

== Conservation ==
This plant was considered extinct for over 50 years because its historical populations had disappeared. It was rediscovered in 1994 in the San Jacinto Mountains.
