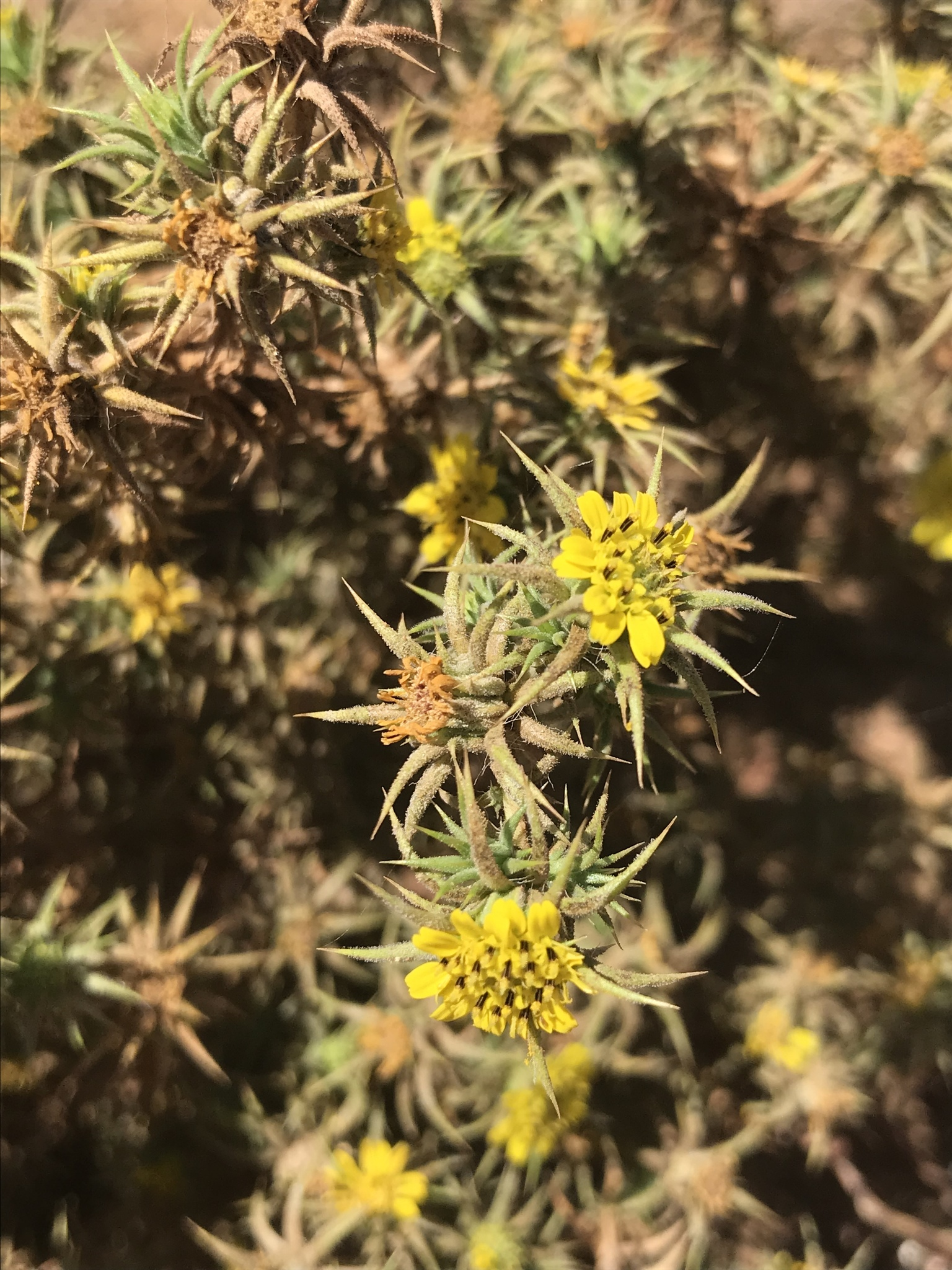

Scientific classification
- Kingdom: Plantae
- Clade: Tracheophytes
- Clade: Angiosperms
- Clade: Eudicots
- Clade: Asterids
- Order: Asterales
- Family: Asteraceae
- Genus: Centromadia
- Species: C. perennis

Binomial name
- Centromadia perennis Greene

Synonyms
- Hemizonia perennis (Greene) D.D.Keck

= Centromadia perennis =

Species of flowering plant

Centromadia perennis is a species of Mexican plant in the tribe Madieae within the family Asteraceae. It is native to the State of Baja California Sur in western Mexico. The initial discovery of the species was near Boca del Salado in the East Cape Region near the south end of the peninsula.
