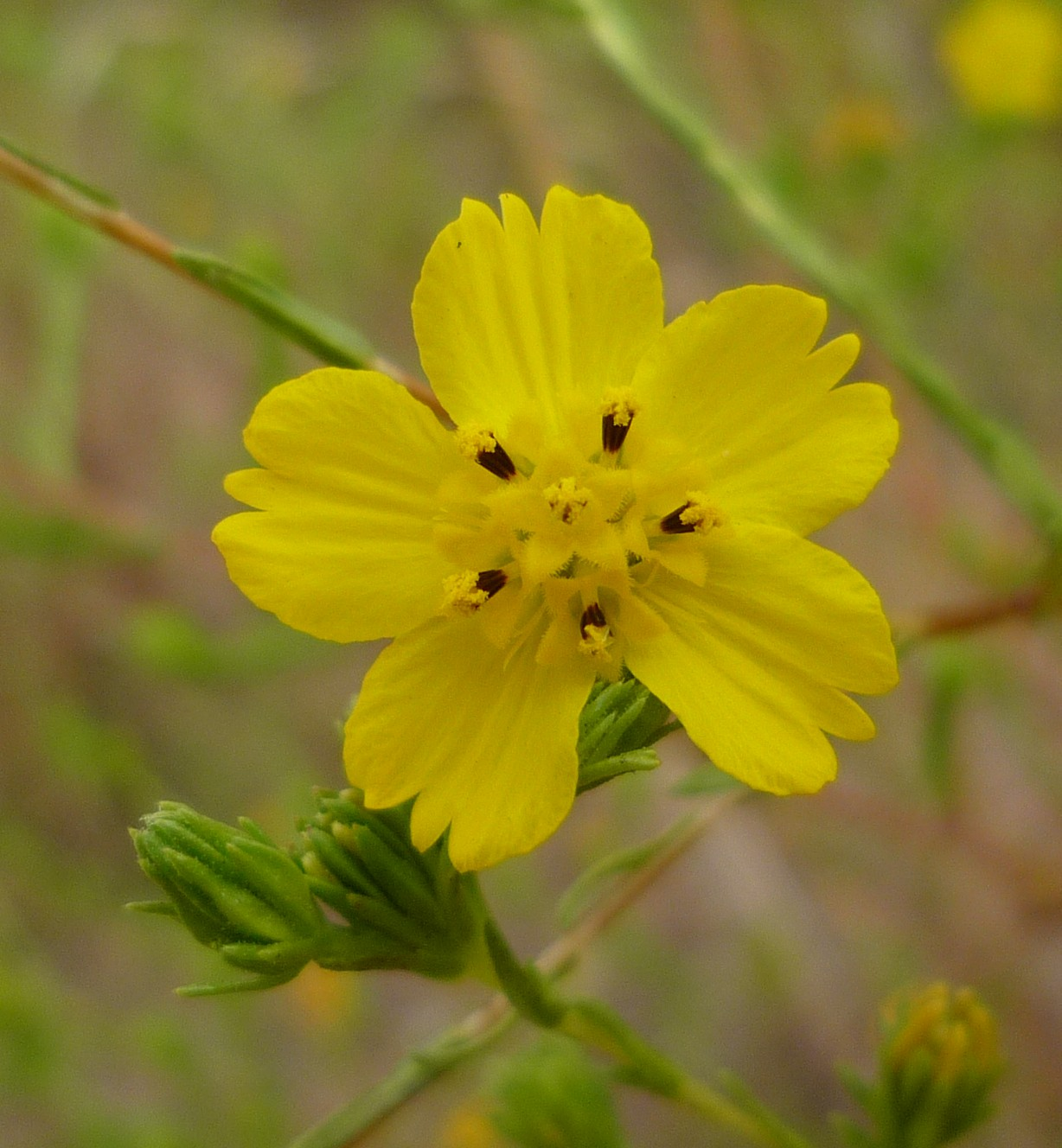

Scientific classification
- Kingdom: Plantae
- Clade: Tracheophytes
- Clade: Angiosperms
- Clade: Eudicots
- Clade: Asterids
- Order: Asterales
- Family: Asteraceae
- Genus: Deinandra
- Species: D. fasciculata

Binomial name
- Deinandra fasciculata DC.

Synonyms
- Hemizonia fasciculata DC.; Deinandra fasciculata var. ramosissima (Benth.) Davidson & Moxley; Deinandra simplex Elmer; Hartmannia fasciculata DC.; Hemizonia ramosissima Benth.

= Deinandra fasciculata =

Species of flowering plant

Deinandra fasciculata (syn: Hemizonia fasciculata), known by the common names clustered tarweed and fascicled spikeweed, is a species of flowering plant in the family Asteraceae native to western North America.

== Range ==
Deinandra fasciculata is native to Baja California and California (primarily from San Diego County to Monterey County, including several of the Channel Islands; Calflora reports a few collections from the San Francisco Bay area, but these are from urban areas and probably represent cultivated specimens). It is a common member of coastal grassland habitats in the California chaparral and woodlands ecoregion and other habitats.

== Description ==
Deinandra fasciculata is a thin-stemmed branched annual herb growing erect up to 100 cm (40 inches) in height. The upper leaves are narrow, about 1 centimeter long nested against the stem (more like short needles than leaves). The lower leaves are much bigger, up to 15 centimeters (6 inches) long.

Each flower head has a center of six yellowish disc florets with black stamens surrounded by five yellow ray florets. The ray florets generally have three teeth, the central tooth being the smallest. Plants flower in May through October.

In this genus the disk flowers are actually big enough to be seen as tiny flowers to the naked eye.

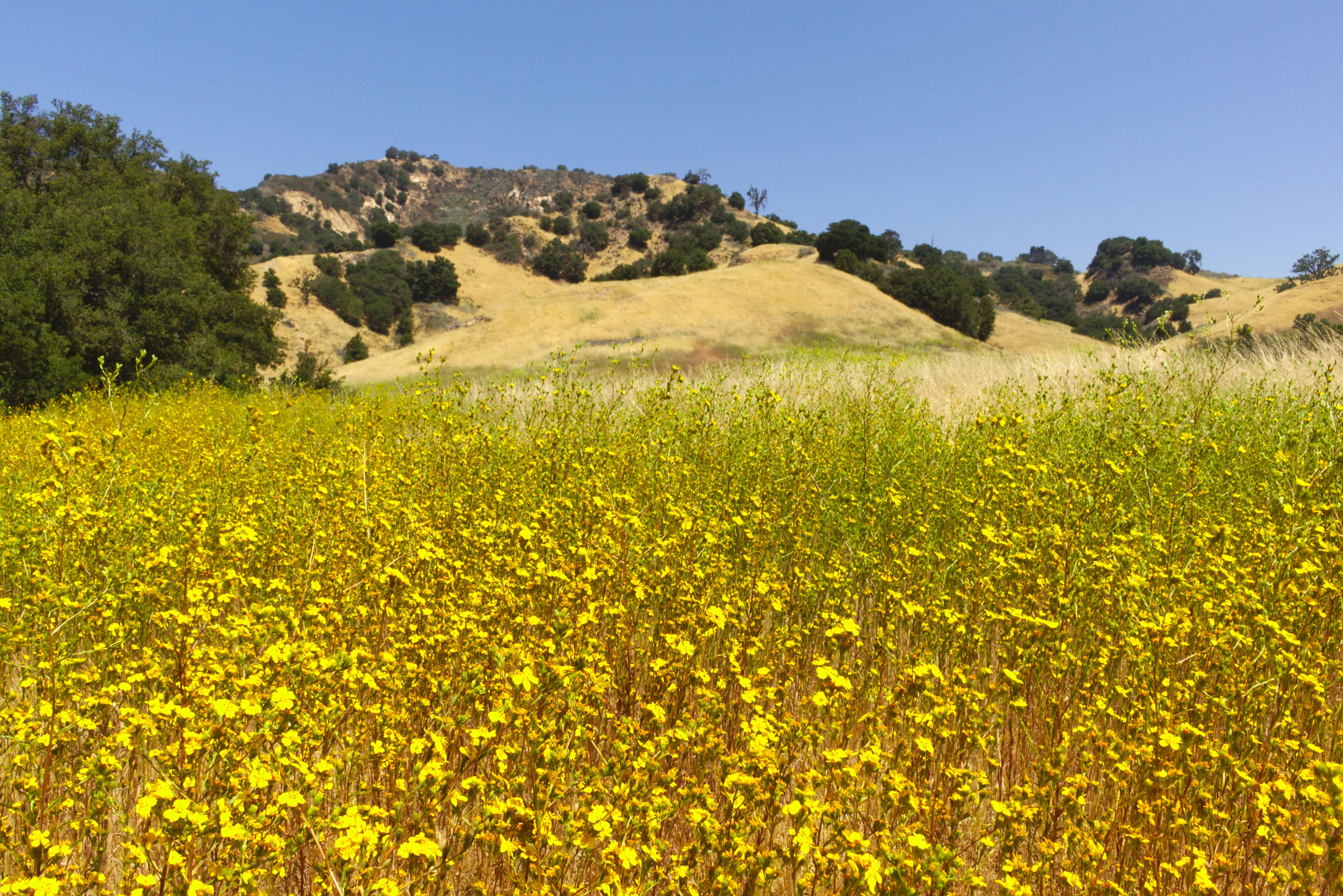
Flowering Deinandra fasciculata plants in Malibu Creek State Park, California.

The plant has a tar-like smell.

== Ecology ==
Deinandra fasciculata is pollinated by bees, and the seeds are primarily gravity-dispersed (they fall from the seed heads when mature). Seeds may also be dispersed by the many bird and small mammal species which eat them.

This species may hybridize with other members of its genus, as well as with Hemizonia and Centromadia species.
