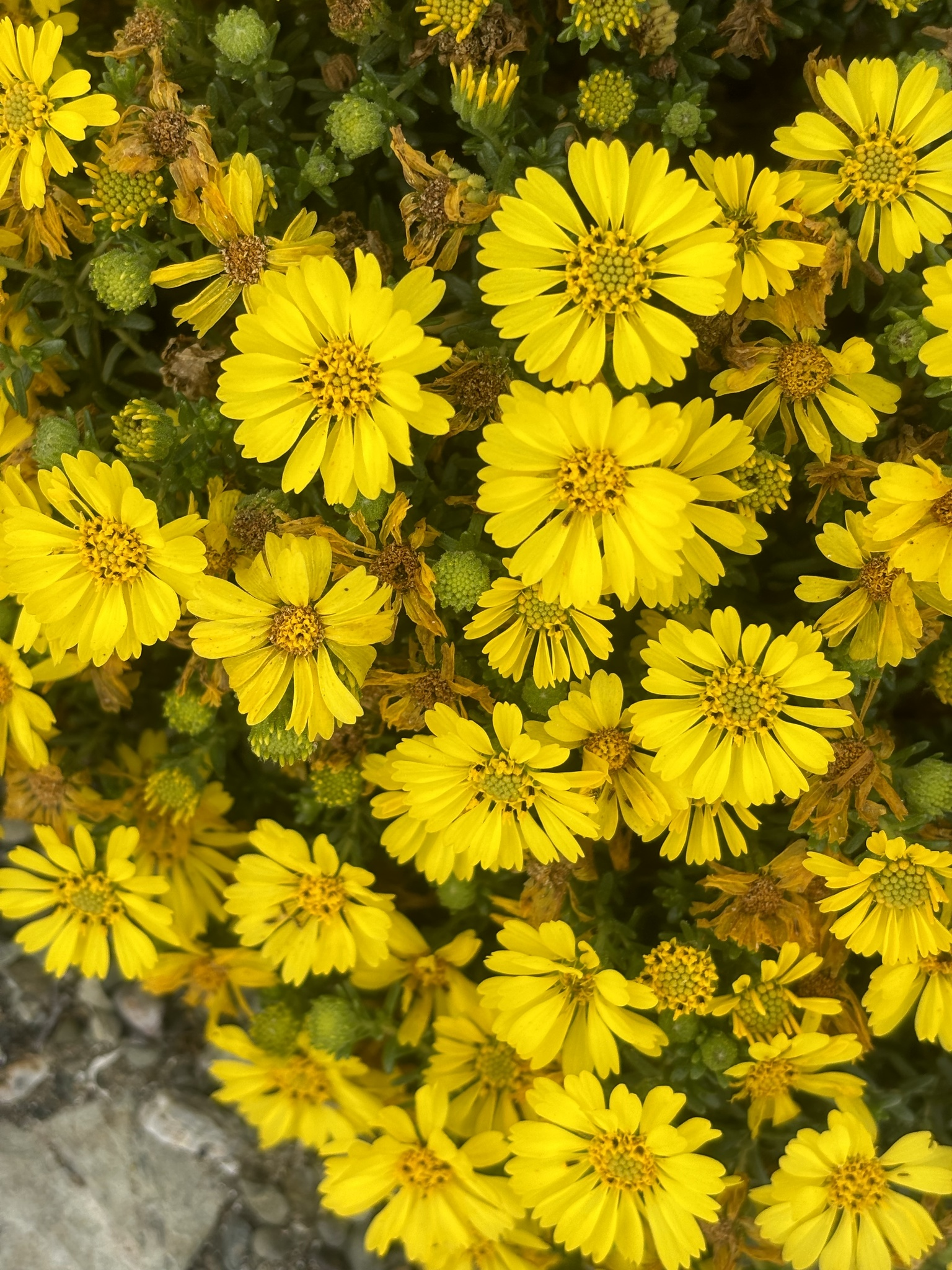

Scientific classification
- Kingdom: Plantae
- Clade: Tracheophytes
- Clade: Angiosperms
- Clade: Eudicots
- Clade: Asterids
- Order: Asterales
- Family: Asteraceae
- Genus: Deinandra
- Species: D. streetsii

Binomial name
- Deinandra streetsii (A.Gray) B.G.Baldwin

Synonyms
- Hemizonia streetsii A.Gray

= Deinandra streetsii =

Species of flowering plant

Deinandra streetsii is a rare North American species of plant in the tribe Madieae within the family Asteraceae.

Deinandra streetsii has is native to the state of Baja California in northwestern Mexico. The species has been found only on San Benito Island, 25 km (16 miles) west of Cedros Island, both parts of the state of Baja California.

Deinandra streetsii is closely related to D. corymbosa, with narrow linear leaves. It produces many yellow flower heads, each with both disc florets and ray florets.
