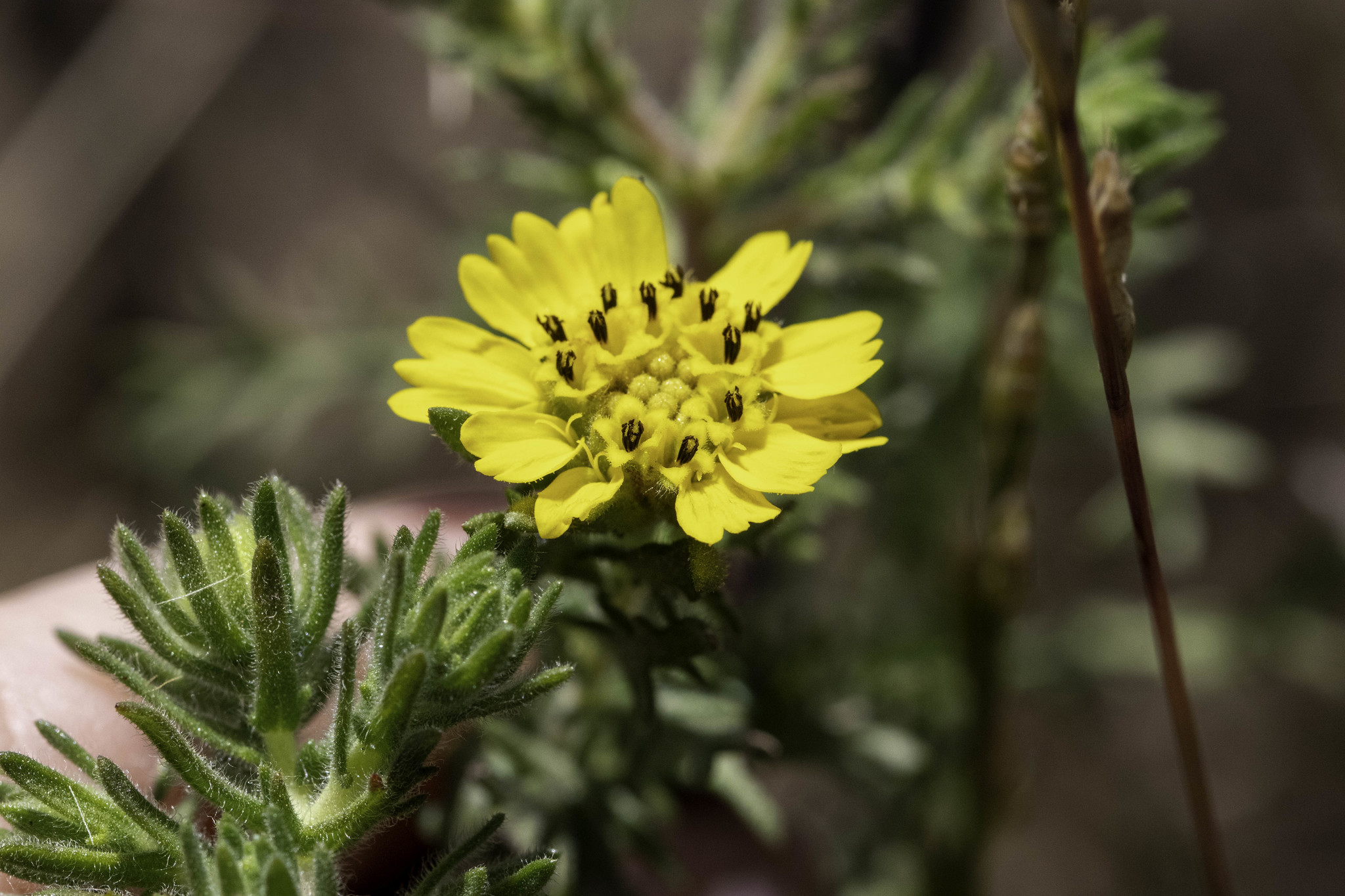
- Deinandra increscens var. villosa

Scientific classification
- Kingdom: Plantae
- Clade: Tracheophytes
- Clade: Angiosperms
- Clade: Eudicots
- Clade: Asterids
- Order: Asterales
- Family: Asteraceae
- Genus: Deinandra
- Species: D. increscens

Binomial name
- Deinandra increscens (H.M.Hall ex D.D.Keck) B.G.Baldwin

Synonyms
- Hemizonia increscens (H.M.Hall ex D.D.Keck) Tanowitz; Hemizonia paniculata subsp. increscens H.M.Hall ex D.D.Keck; Hemizonia increscens subsp. villosa Tanowitz, syn of subsp. villosa

= Deinandra increscens =

Species of flowering plant in California

Deinandra increscens is a species of flowering plant in the family Asteraceae known by the common name grassland tarweed. It is endemic to California, where it has been found primarily in Monterey, San Luis Obispo and Santa Barbara Counties (including Santa Cruz and Santa Rosa Islands). A few isolated populations have been reported from Kern and Merced Counties, but these are from urban areas (Cities of Merced and Bakersfield) and probably represent cultivated specimens.

Deinandra increscens is an annual up to 100 cm (40 inches) tall. It has numerous flower heads, often tightly clumped together, each with yellow ray florets and disc florets with yellow corollas but red or purple anthers.

Deinandra bacigalupii, the Livermore tarplant, was previously included under Deinandra increscens ssp. increscens before being separated and elevated to species level in 1999.

== Subspecies ==
Subspecies include:

- Deinandra increscens subsp. increscens grows along the California Central Coast and the coastal mountain ranges.
- Deinandra increscens subsp. villosa (Gaviota tarweed) is a rare and endangered subspecies endemic to Santa Barbara County, where it is known only from an area on the Gaviota Coast.
