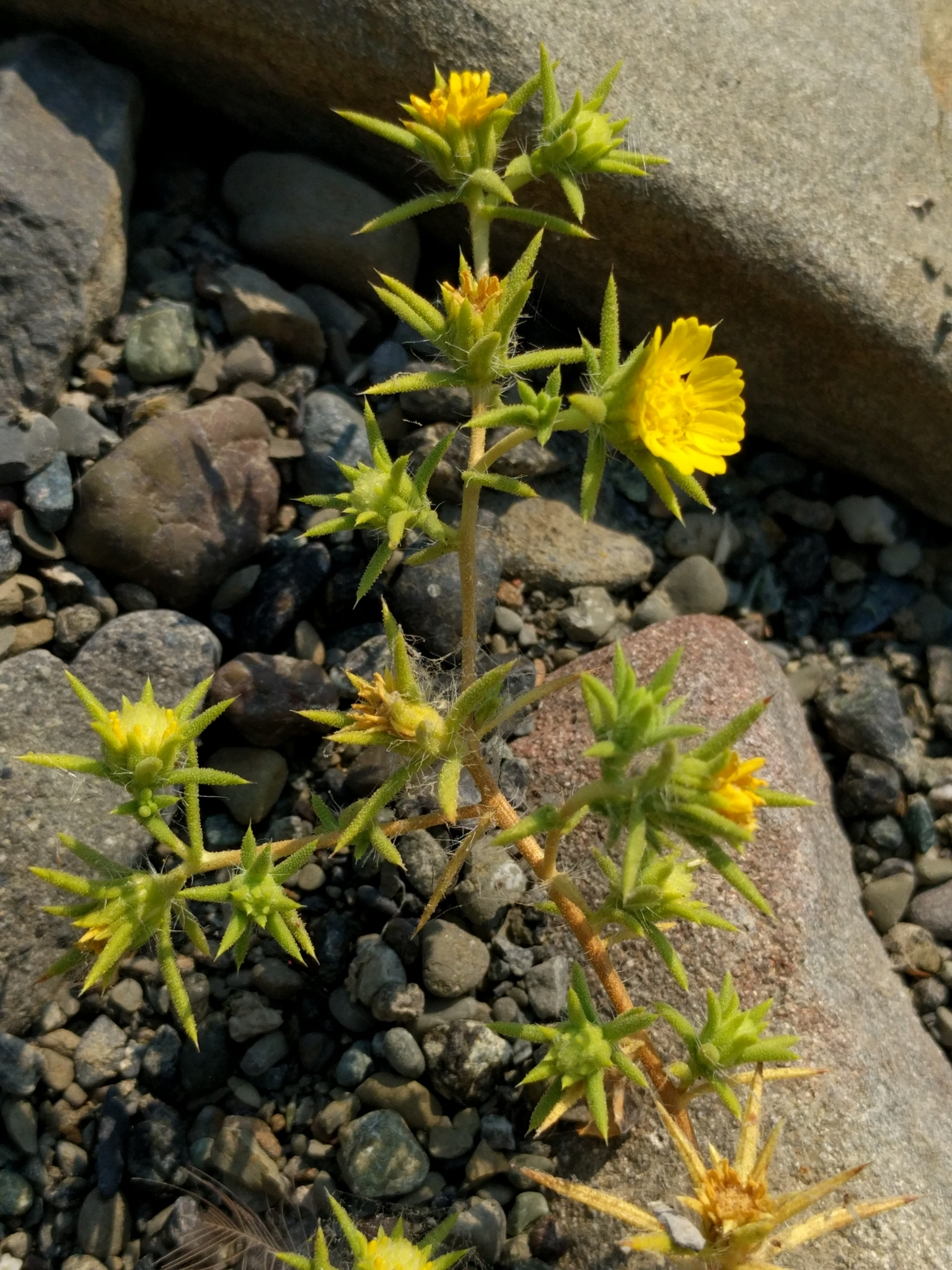

Scientific classification
- Kingdom: Plantae
- Clade: Tracheophytes
- Clade: Angiosperms
- Clade: Eudicots
- Clade: Asterids
- Order: Asterales
- Family: Asteraceae
- Genus: Centromadia
- Species: C. parryi

Binomial name
- Centromadia parryi (Greene) Greene

Synonyms
- Hemizonia parryi Greene; Hemizonia australis (D.D.Keck) D.D.Keck, syn of subsp. australis; Centromadia congdonii (B.L.Rob. & Greenm.) C.P.Sm., syn of subsp. congdonii; Hemizonia congdonii B.L.Rob. & Greenm., syn of subsp. congdonii; Centromadia rudis Greene, syn of subsp. rudis

= Centromadia parryi =

Species of flowering plant

Centromadia parryi, the pappose tarweed, is a species of plant in the tribe Madieae within the family Asteraceae. It is found in North America where it is native to California and, northern Baja California.

Centromadia parryi is an herb up to 70 cm (28 inches) tall. It produces arrays of numerous yellow flower heads with both ray florets and disc florets.

Subspecies

- Centromadia parryi subsp. australis (D.D.Keck) B.G.Baldwin - from Santa Barbara Co to Baja California
- Centromadia parryi subsp. congdonii (B.L.Rob. & Greenm.) B.G.Baldwin - from Solano Co to San Luis Obispo Co
- Centromadia parryi subsp. parryi - from Glenn Co to Santa Clara Co
- Centromadia parryi subsp. rudis (Greene) B.G.Baldwin - from Butte Co + Mendocino Co to Merced Co; also Modoc Co
