= California Endangered Species Act =

State-level species conservation law

In 1970 California became one of the first states in the U.S. to implement an act that conserves and protects endangered species and their environments. The California Endangered Species Act (CESA) declares that "all native species of fishes, amphibians, reptiles, birds, mammals, and plants, and their habitats, threatened with extinction and those experiencing a significant decline which, if not halted, would lead to a threatened or endangered designation, will be protected or preserved."

The California Fish and Game Commission holds designation over the process of adding species to the CESA based on the state human impact has left them in and how significant of a role they play in their local environment. The California Department of Fish and Wildlife (CDFW) oversees CESA and makes sure that citizens are following laws/regulations that are in place. Violators of the CESA will be faced with fines of up to $50,000 and/or one year imprisonment for crimes involving endangered species, and fines of up to $25,000 and/or six months imprisonment for crimes involving threatened species.

== History ==
In 1970, California was one of the first states to officially create statutory schemes for protecting endangered wildlife and environments. This was completed earlier than the Federal Government's Endangered Species Act (ESA), which was mandated in 1973. However, according to the chronologies listed by the Department of Fish and Wildlife, California began preservation and protection statutes in 1909 when non-game birds were first protected. In 1957, rules were devised to prevent the "taking" of animals or plants under protection. The term "to take" is basically defined as removing, harming, or killing the protected species. However, the California Endangered Species Act (CESA) explicitly defines "take" as not including the terms "harm" or "harass", while these terms do appear in the federal ESA definition of "take". This has been interpreted to mean that in California, "take" of a listed species must involve mortality, as opposed to habitat alteration that adversely impacts the listed species.

The year 1970 brought about two major California enactments: the California Species Preservation Act, and the California Endangered Species Act. The Species Preservation Act tasked the Department with creating an inventory of all fish and wildlife that could be considered rare or endangered. The list was to be reported to the Legislature along with suggestions on methods for protection. The California Endangered Species Act put into effect the Department's authority to determine the designation under which wildlife was labeled as "rare" or "endangered" and provided restrictions on the importing and moving of those species except by permit. At the time, this Act did not include plants or invertebrates.

In 1984, CESA was amended and became a more complex Act that determined it the state’s responsibility to preserve and protect endangered species. The amendment to CESA now included plant and invertebrate species and also announced the intention to purchase lands for preservation of protected species. Mitigation and enhancement methods were also introduced. In 1997, CESA was amended again to allow the "incidental taking" of protected species beyond the original ruling of scientific and educational purposes only. This has been cause for some controversy.

== CESA process overview ==
While CESA is considered effective, the multitude of agencies working within the framework of CESA can lead to poor communication and effectiveness due to entities working at cross purposes, which ultimately leads to less protection and poorer use of time and resources for conservation programming. Such ineffectiveness is in part due to the wide range of diversity in California’s ecosystems, with there being a great difference in species and traits from biome to biome. As a result, there are debates between agencies on what would be the most effective course of action in certain ecosystems, which species are going to be affected, and what aftershocks their intervention will have for the area as a whole later down the line. The program understands that there is room for improvement, and there have been suggestions of ways to streamline such debates. However, as with the previous issues, there is inner contention that raises difficulties in having them passed in the first place.

== Listing ==
The listing process includes procedures for individuals, organizations or the California Department of Fish and Wildlife. Petitions can be submitted to the Department for a species, subspecies, or variety of any plant or animal to add, delete, or note a change in status on the list of endangered or threatened species. The petitions will be handled by the Habitat Conservation Planning Branch. The process includes reviewing a region where the species is in habitation, conducting a visit to where the species is, and presenting a report. After 90 days of the petition, the Habitat Conservation Planning Branch sends the report to the director for approval. If the petition is approved the species becomes a candidate species.

As of 2014 it was very difficult to convince the CESA to list a plant as an endangered species: the agency had listed no plants at all since 2007, and had only listed six since 2000. The successful listing of the Livermore tarplant in 2014 was hoped by supporters to serve as a template for listing more endangered plants under the act.

At the state level, as of April 2023 CESA lists 54 animals as Endangered and another 43 as Threatened, together with 89 federally listed Endangered animals and 46 federally listed Threatened animals. As of the same date, there are 137 state-listed Endangered plants and 21 state-listed Threatened plants, in addition to 131 federally listed Endangered Species and 51 federally listed Threatened plants.

== Comparison to similar laws ==
California's endangered species act is considered superior to similar acts enacted in other states due to its comprehensive design, its involvement in the pursuit of prevention, and for its cooperative relationships with programs such as Natural Community Conservation Planning (NCCP).

It is also considered to be significantly more effective than the federal Endangered Species Act because of its protection of plants on private property: the federal act solely protects plants present on federal property.

== Litigation ==
In 2018, public interest groups petitioned to list four species of bumblebee as endangered in California, and this was initially approved; however, in 2019 this decision was challenged by a petition filed in trial court, and the trial court granted the petition, agreeing with the plaintiffs that the law did not grant authority to list insects as endangered. This decision was then appealed, and the California Court of Appeal in May of 2022 upheld that bumblebees (and all other invertebrates) are protected under the CESA, because (1) the statute has since 1984 explicitly listed invertebrates under the law's definition of fish ("a wild fish, mollusk, crustacean, invertebrate, amphibian, or part, spawn, or ovum of any of those animals"), and the legal definition overrides any other definition, even for a common colloquial term like "fish", and (2) the Act originally included one terrestrial invertebrate, and therefore it was demonstrably intentional that terrestrial invertebrates (including bees) are meant to be granted protection; the trial court's decision was therefore summarily reversed. In September of 2022, California’s Supreme Court denied review of a further petition filed to appeal the Court of Appeal's May decision; the Supreme Court’s decision not to review the petition for appeal allows the Court of Appeal’s earlier ruling to stand.

== Protected species ==
For a complete list of the threatened or endangered animals (as of 2025) see the Threatened or Endangered Animal Species List provided by the CDFW. To see threatened or endangered plants see the Threatened or Endangered Plant Species List. To see what species have been granted fully protected status, meaning they cannot be possessed under any circumstance unless the very rare exception is made by the CDFW for a specimen's relocation or study, see the Fully Protected Animals List.

== Public involvement ==
For those wanting to help in the efforts of these conservation efforts, the CDFW provides a collection of Volunteer Opportunities open to the general public to take part in, in the effort of drawing connections between communities and their surrounding natural environment. Such volunteer work opportunities appeal to the range of conservation efforts, research, or educating others.
