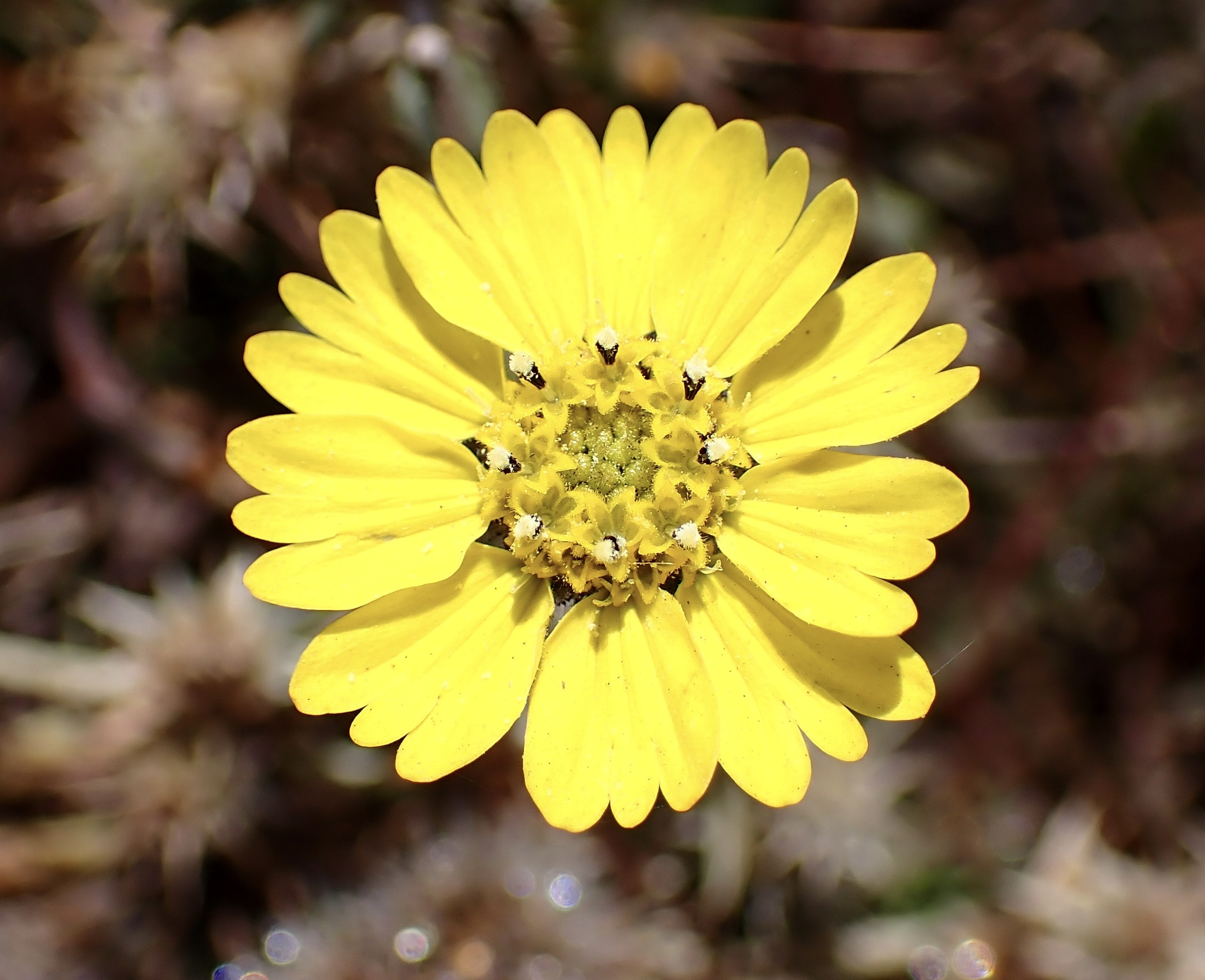

Scientific classification
- Kingdom: Plantae
- Clade: Tracheophytes
- Clade: Angiosperms
- Clade: Eudicots
- Clade: Asterids
- Order: Asterales
- Family: Asteraceae
- Genus: Deinandra
- Species: D. corymbosa

Binomial name
- Deinandra corymbosa (DC.) B.G.Baldwin

Synonyms
- Hartmannia corymbosa DC.; Hemizonia corymbosa (DC.) Torr. & A.Gray; Hemizonia macrocephala Nutt.; Zonanthemis corymbosa (DC.) Greene

= Deinandra corymbosa =

Species of flowering plant

Deinandra corymbosa is a rare North American species of plants in the tribe Madieae within the family Asteraceae. A common name is coastal tarweed.

Deinandra corymbosa is native to California, found in the Coast Ranges from Humboldt County to Santa Barbara County. Isolated populations have been reported further inland in Shasta and Kern Counties, the latter in an urban area within the City of Mariposa.

Deinandra corymbosa is an annual herb up to 100 cm (40 inches) tall. It produces many yellow flower heads, each with both disc florets and ray florets.
