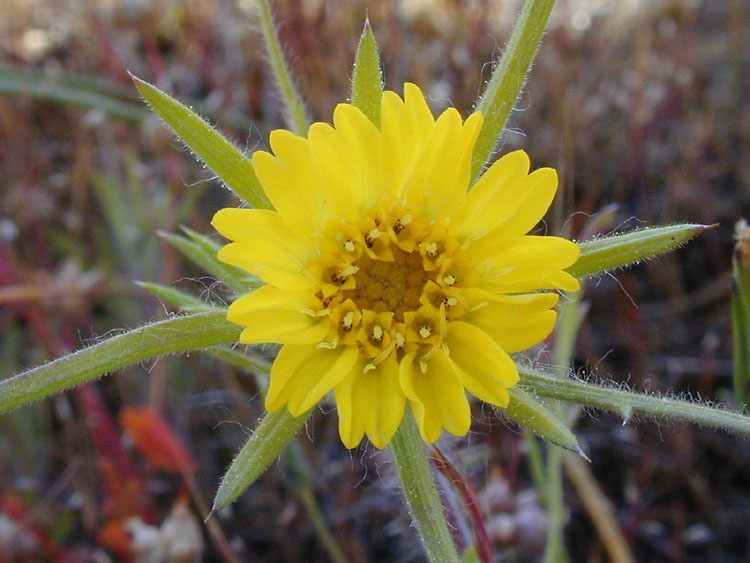
- Centromadia fitchii

Scientific classification
- Kingdom: Plantae
- Clade: Tracheophytes
- Clade: Angiosperms
- Clade: Eudicots
- Clade: Asterids
- Order: Asterales
- Family: Asteraceae
- Subfamily: Asteroideae
- Tribe: Madieae
- Subtribe: Madiinae
- Genus: Centromadia; Greene

Synonyms
- Hemizonia section Centromadia

= Centromadia =

Genus of flowering plants

Centromadia is a genus of North American plants in the tribe Madieae within the family Asteraceae.

Species

- Centromadia fitchii (A.Gray) Greene - California, southwestern Oregon
- Centromadia parryi (Greene) Greene - California, Baja California
- Centromadia perennis Greene - Baja California Sur
- Centromadia pungens (Hook. & Arn.) Greene - Baja California, western United States
