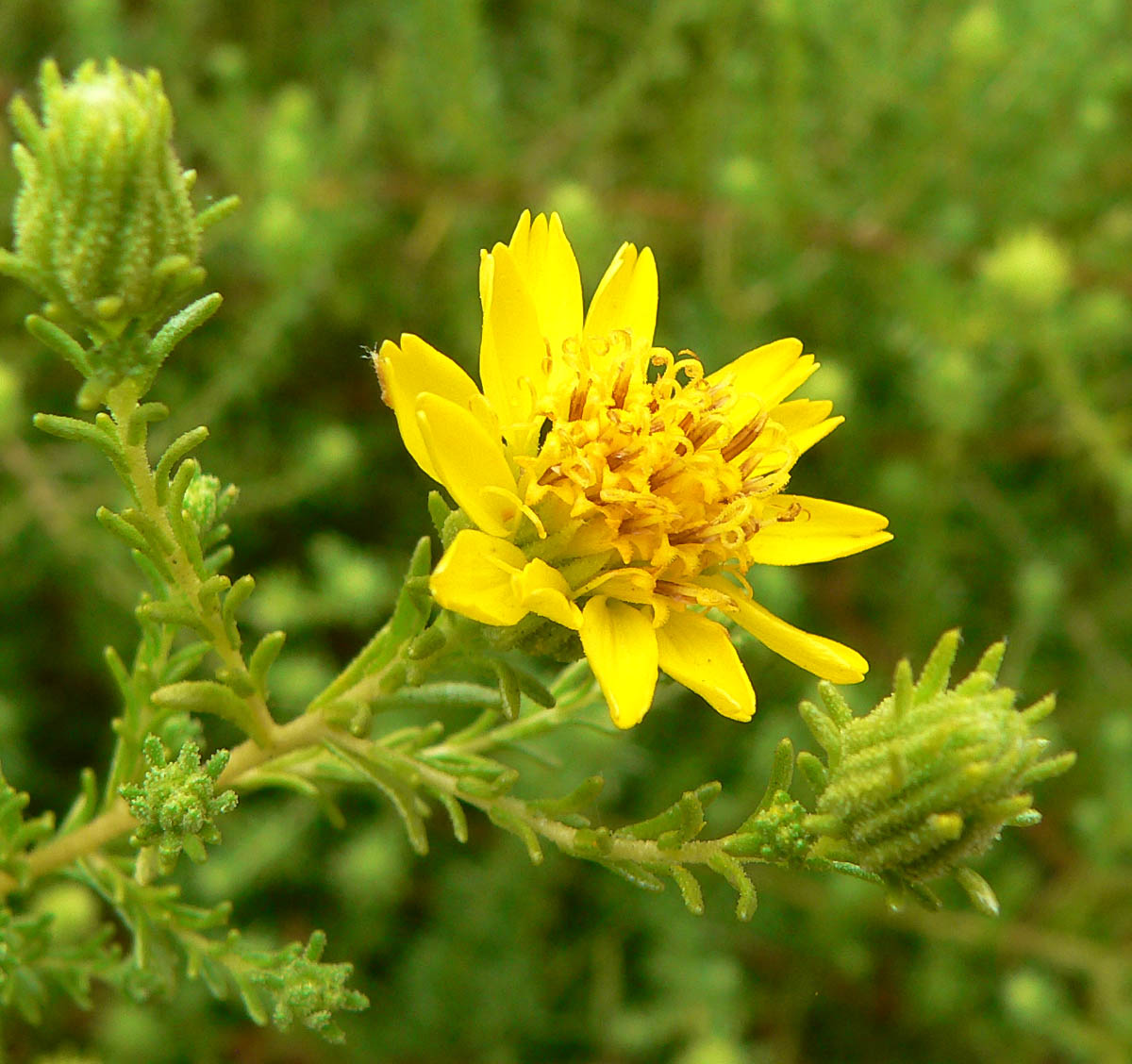

Conservation status
- Imperiled (NatureServe)

Scientific classification
- Kingdom: Plantae
- Clade: Tracheophytes
- Clade: Angiosperms
- Clade: Eudicots
- Clade: Asterids
- Order: Asterales
- Family: Asteraceae
- Genus: Deinandra
- Species: D. minthornii

Binomial name
- Deinandra minthornii (Jeps.) B.G.Baldwin

Synonyms
- Hemizonia minthornii Jeps.

= Deinandra minthornii =

Species of flowering plant

Deinandra minthornii — (syn. Hemizonia minthornii) — is a rare California species of flowering plant in the family Asteraceae known by the common name Santa Susana tarplant, or Santa Susana tarweed. It is listed as a rare species by the California Department of Fish and Wildlife and on the California Native Plant Society Inventory of Rare and Endangered Plants of California.

== Description ==
Deinandra minthornii is a shrub or subshrub growing 15 centimetres (5.9 in) to 1 metre (3.3 ft) in height. The stems are grow mainly from the base of the plant and are puberulent (hairy) to short-bristly, minutely glandular, and densely leafy. The leaves are often deciduous, 2–3 centimetres (0.79–1.18 in) long blades that are thick, linear, proximal and pinnatifid or pinnately lobed to toothed; they are hirtellous (short-coarse-hairy), sometimes stipitate-glandular (stalked-glandular).

The inflorescence is a singly borne head in loose, racemiform to paniculiform clusters; bracts subtend (stand beneath the base of) the head and generally overlap none or half of the involucre; the phyllaries lining the heads are evenly stipitate-glandular, often with some glandless hairs with slender, non-pustular bases. Paleae subtend most or all disk flowers. The flower heads contain four to eight 5.5–6.5-millimetre (0.22–0.26 in) long deep yellow corolla or laminae in the ray florets; within the ray florets are eighteen to twenty-three 1–3-millimetre (0.039–0.118 in) disc florets which are completely or mostly functionally staminate with yellow or brownish anthers. There are eight to twelve 1–3-millimetre (0.039–0.118 in) linear to lance-linear pappi with entire to fringed scales. Fruits are 2.5–3 millimetres (0.098–0.118 in) in size and short-beaked. The plant flowers from June to November.

== Taxonomy ==
D. minthornii was described as Hemizonia minthornii by Willis Linn Jepson in his 1925 Manual of the Flowering Plants of California. Its botanical name honors botanist Theodore Wilson Minthorn and his sister Maud Minthorn who collected plants in Southern California in the beginning of the 20th century.

== Distribution and habitat ==
D. minthornii is endemic from the Santa Susana Mountains, through the Simi Hills, to the Santa Monica Mountains of the southwestern Transverse Ranges, in Los Angeles and Ventura Counties, Southern California.

This plant grows in the coastal sage scrub and chaparral habitats of the coastal sage and chaparral, and the chaparral habitat of the adjacent inland the montane chaparral and woodlands. It can be found on rocky outcroppings and in sandstone crevices, from 300–500 metres (980–1,640 ft) in elevation. There are about 20 occurrences of the plant, but several have not been observed recently.

== Ecology ==
Pollinators are vital in the reproduction of the plant because it does not self-pollinate.
