= Deinandra palmeri =

Scientific classification
- Kingdom: Plantae
- Clade: Tracheophytes
- Clade: Angiosperms
- Clade: Eudicots
- Clade: Asterids
- Order: Asterales
- Family: Asteraceae
- Genus: Deinandra
- Species: D. palmeri

Binomial name
- Deinandra palmeri (Rose) B.G.Baldwin

Synonyms
- Hemizonia palmeri Rose

Species of flowering plant

Deinandra palmeri is a rare North American species of plants in the tribe Madieae within the family Asteraceae.

== Location ==
Deinandra palmeri is native to the state of Baja California in northwestern Mexico. The species has been found only on Guadalupe Island, 400 km (150 miles) west of the mainland of the Baja California Peninsula, part of the State of Baja California.

== Characteristics ==
Deinandra palmeri is a perennial shrub with a thick woody base. It produces many yellow flower heads, each with both disc florets and ray florets.
