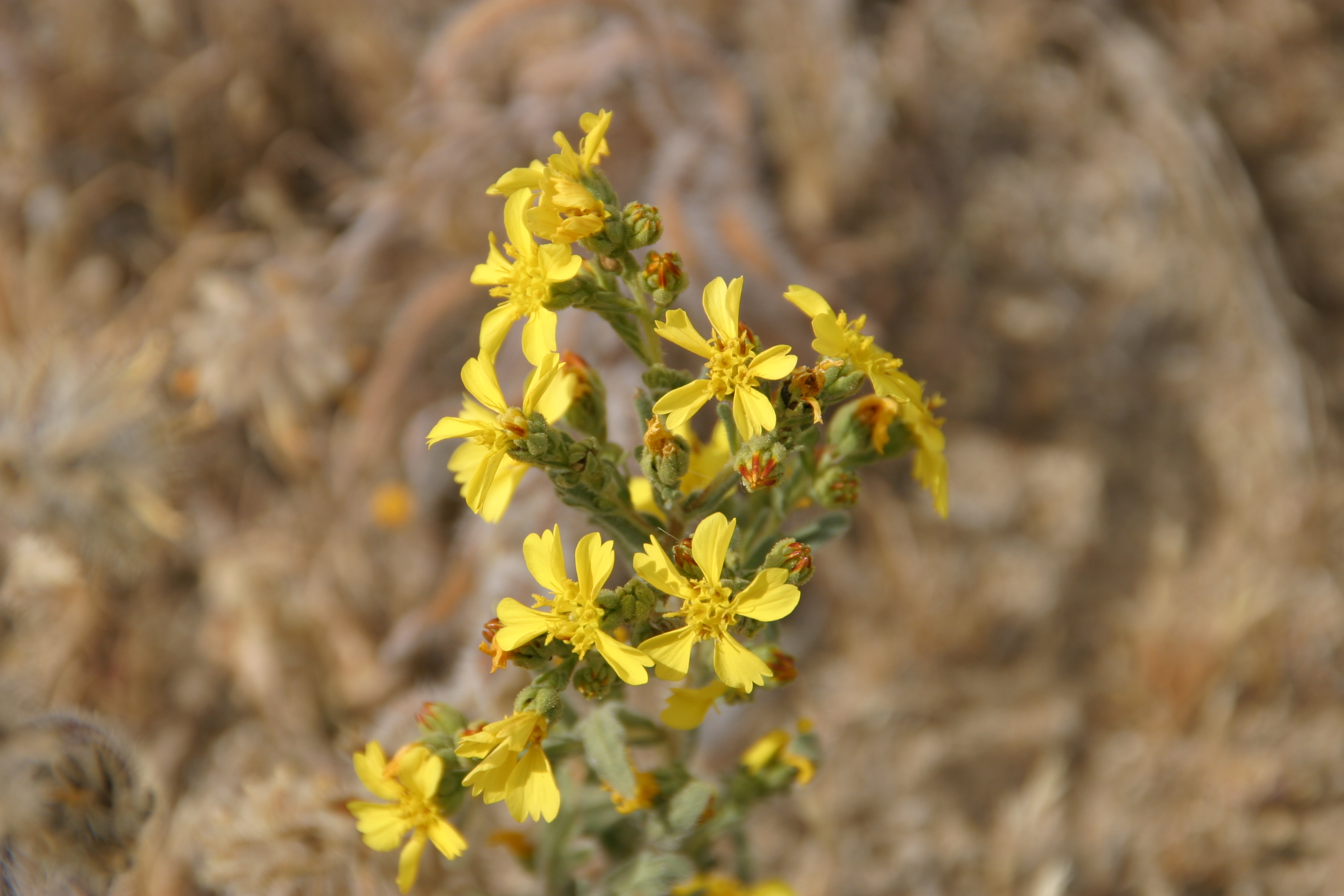

Conservation status
- Secure (NatureServe)

Scientific classification
- Kingdom: Plantae
- Clade: Tracheophytes
- Clade: Angiosperms
- Clade: Eudicots
- Clade: Asterids
- Order: Asterales
- Family: Asteraceae
- Genus: Deinandra
- Species: D. kelloggii

Binomial name
- Deinandra kelloggii (Greene) Greene

Synonyms
- Deinandra kellogii Greene; Deinandra wrightii (A.Gray) Greene; Hemizonia kellogii Greene; Hemizonia kelloggii Greene

= Deinandra kelloggii =

Species of flowering plant

Deinandra kelloggii, Kellogg's spikeweed or Kellogg's tarweed, is a North American species of plant in the tribe Madieae within the family Asteraceae. It is native to Baja California, southern and central California (from Sonoma and Calaveras Counties south to San Diego County), and Arizona (Pima County).

Deinandra kelloggii is an annual herb, sometimes growing to a height of 150 cm (5 feet). The plant produces numerous flower heads, each with 5 yellow ray florets and 6 disc florets with yellow corollas but with yellow, red, brown, or maroon anthers.
