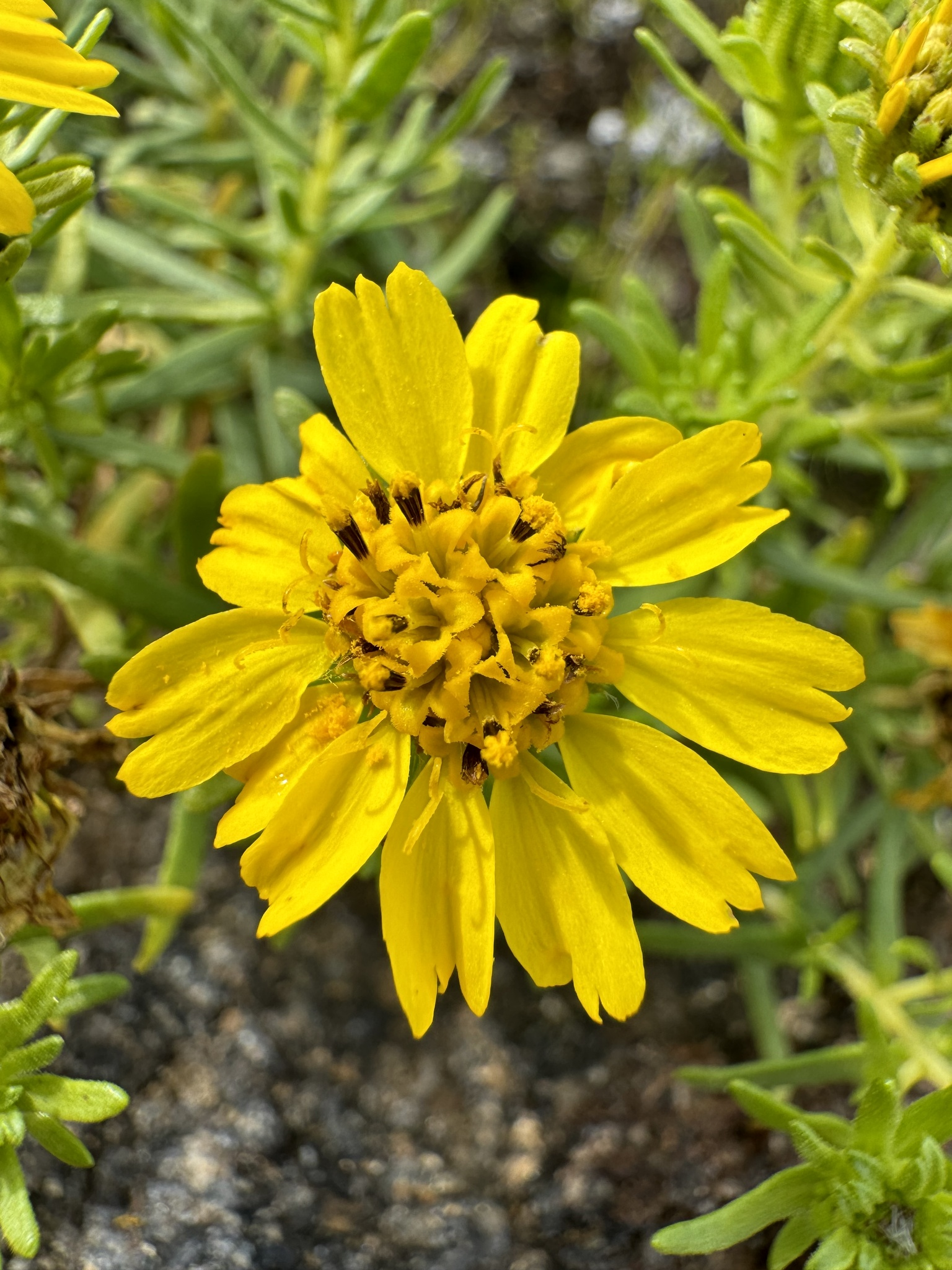

Scientific classification
- Kingdom: Plantae
- Clade: Tracheophytes
- Clade: Angiosperms
- Clade: Eudicots
- Clade: Asterids
- Order: Asterales
- Family: Asteraceae
- Genus: Deinandra
- Species: D. clementina

Binomial name
- Deinandra clementina (Brandegee) B.G.Baldwin

Synonyms
- Hemizonia clementina Brandegee; Zonanthemis clementina Davidson & Moxley

= Deinandra clementina =

Species of flowering plant

Deinandra clementina, known by the common name island tarplant, is a species of flowering plant in the family Asteraceae, endemic to the Channel Islands of California.

== Range ==
Deinandra clementina is found in all of the Channel Islands except San Miguel and Santa Rosa.

== Description ==
Deinandra clementina is a sprawling shrub with a woody base, thick leaves and small yellow flowers. It forms thick mats scattered in coastal sage shrub on east and middle Anacapa Island where its acid-green foliage is conspicuous from a distance.
