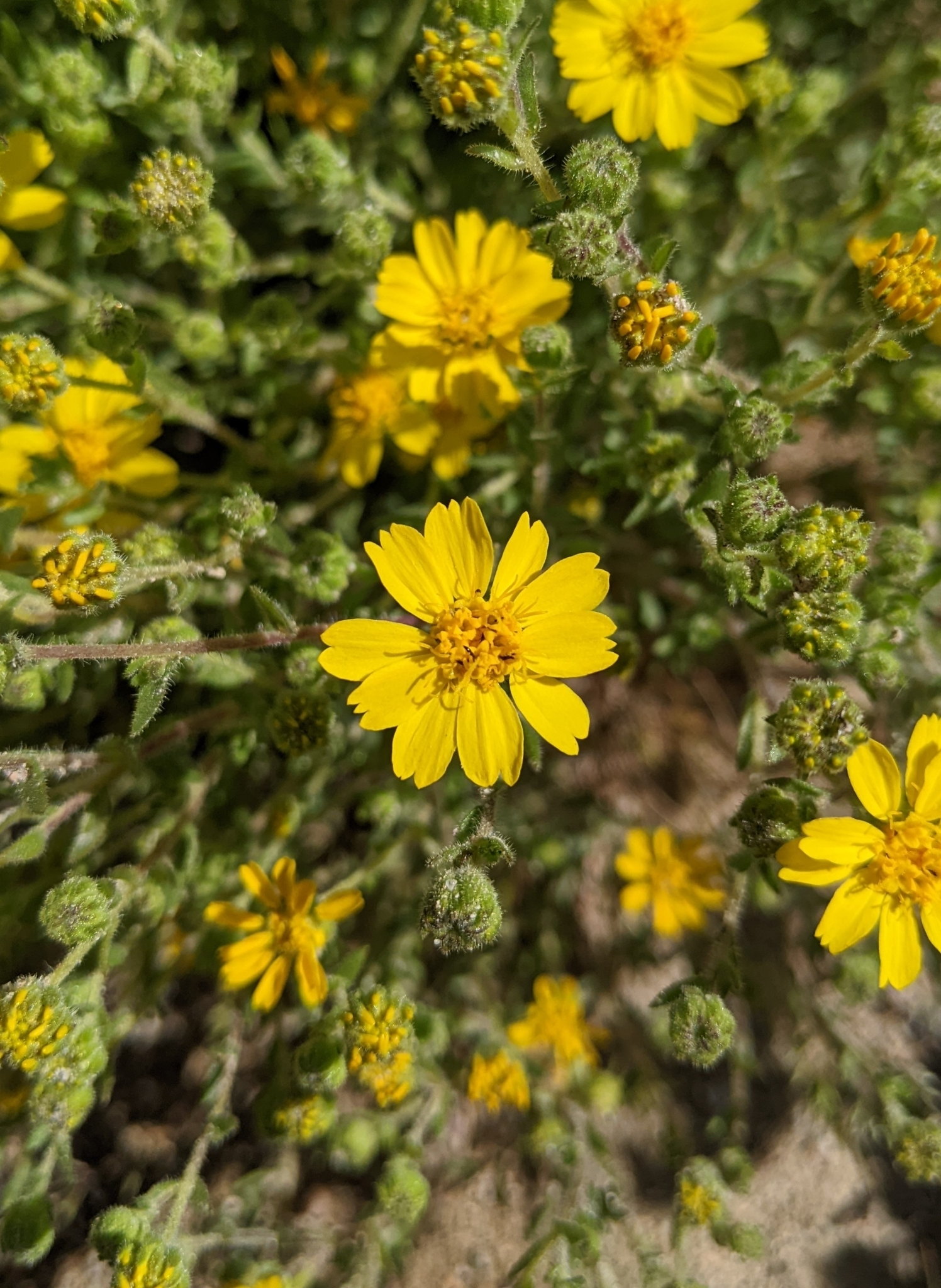

Conservation status
- Critically Imperiled (NatureServe)

Scientific classification
- Kingdom: Plantae
- Clade: Tracheophytes
- Clade: Angiosperms
- Clade: Eudicots
- Clade: Asterids
- Order: Asterales
- Family: Asteraceae
- Genus: Deinandra
- Species: D. arida

Binomial name
- Deinandra arida (D.D.Keck) B.G.Baldwin

Synonyms
- Hemizonia arida D.D.Keck

= Deinandra arida =

Species of flowering plant

Deiandra arida (formerly Hemizonia arida), also called Red Rock tarplant, is a rare California annual plant in the family Asteraceae.

== Habitat and range ==
Deiandra arida occurs on clay and volcanic soils and in desert dry wash from 1,000-3,000 feet (300–900 m) in elevation. It is known from only 10 sites in the Red Rock Canyon State Park area of the Mojave Desert in Kern County, California.

== Growth pattern ==
It is a branched annual growing from 1' to 3' (30–90 cm) tall.

== Leaves and stems ==
Lower leaves are inversely lanceolate and hairless, with toothed margins. Upper leaves are without teeth (entire) at the outside edge, and are covered in sparse, short, stiff hairs, giving it a bristly feel.

== Flowers and fruits ==
Flower heads grow in flat-topped clusters at the tops of stems. Flower heads have 18-25 yellow disk flowers, with 5-10 yellow ray flowers. Bristly phyllaries halfway enclose the akenes.
