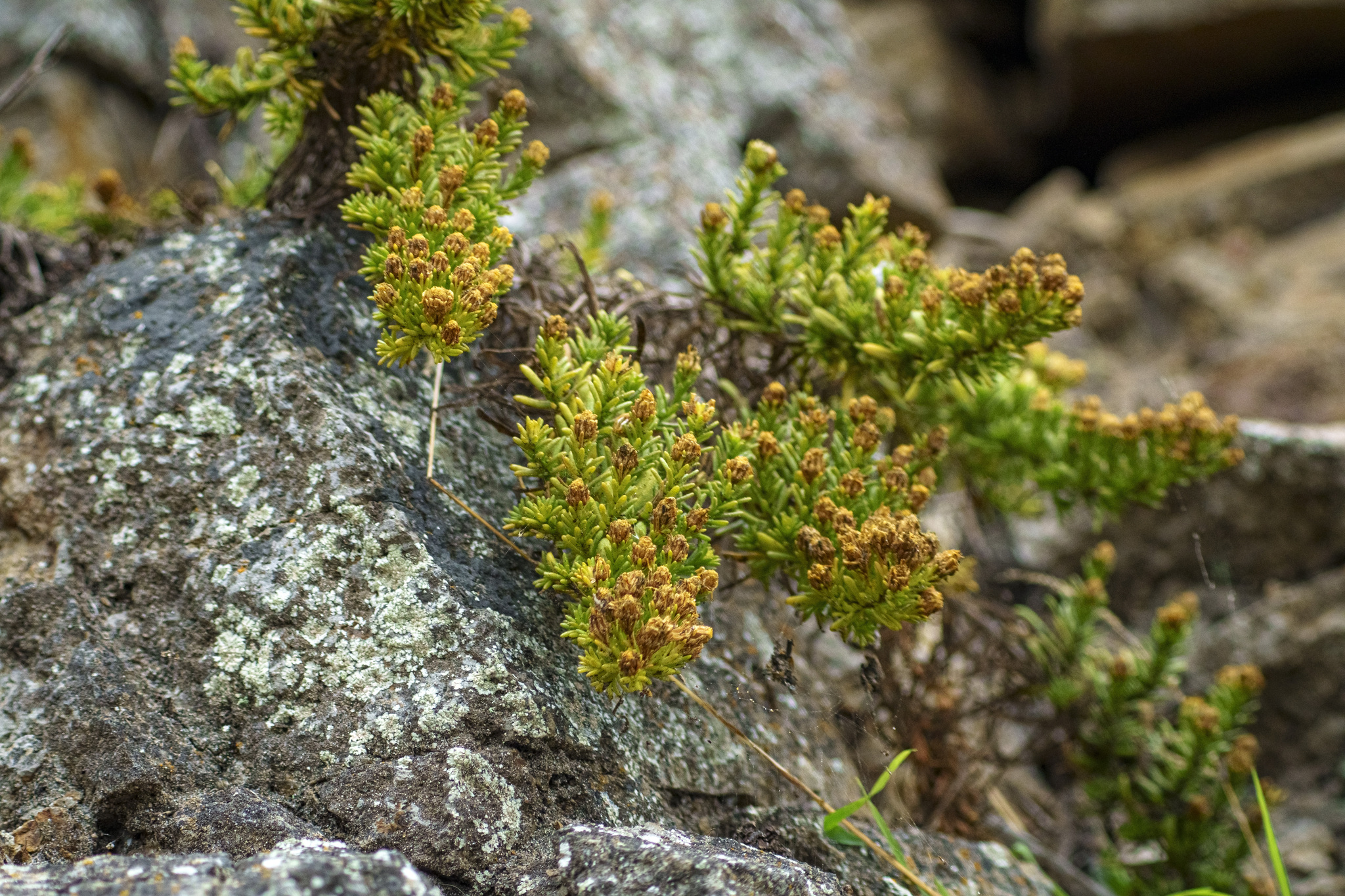
- Deinandra greeneana var. peninsularis

Scientific classification
- Kingdom: Plantae
- Clade: Tracheophytes
- Clade: Angiosperms
- Clade: Eudicots
- Clade: Asterids
- Order: Asterales
- Family: Asteraceae
- Genus: Deinandra
- Species: D. greeneana

Binomial name
- Deinandra greeneana (Rose) B.G.Baldwin

Synonyms
- Hemizonia greeneana Rose; Deinandra peninsularis (Moran) B.G.Baldwin, syn of subsp. peninsularis; Hemizonia greeneana subsp. peninsularis Moran

= Deinandra greeneana =

Species of flowering plant

Deinandra greeneana is a rare North American species of plants in the tribe Madieae within the family Asteraceae.

Deinandra greeneana has been found only in the state of Baja California in northwestern Mexico. The species was thought for many years to be restricted to Guadalupe Island, 400 km (150 miles) west of the mainland, but it was later discovered on the Pacific Coast of the Baja California Peninsula southwest of Ensenada.

Deinandra greeneana is an annual herb up to 120 cm (48 inches) tall. It produces many yellow flower heads, each with both disc florets and ray florets.

Subspecies

- Deinandra greeneana subsp. greeneana - Guadalupe Island
- Deinandra greeneana subsp. peninsularis (Moran) B.G.Baldwin - mainland Baja California
