= Deinandra paniculata =

Scientific classification
- Kingdom: Plantae
- Clade: Tracheophytes
- Clade: Angiosperms
- Clade: Eudicots
- Clade: Asterids
- Order: Asterales
- Family: Asteraceae
- Genus: Deinandra
- Species: D. paniculata

Binomial name
- Deinandra paniculata (A.Gray) Davidson & Moxley

Species of plant

Deinandra paniculata, commonly known as paniculate tarweed or San Diego tarweed, is a flowering plant in the family Asteraceae. It is native to the California Floristic Province. It is a herbaceous annual and usually grows to 2 feet tall, with some individuals reaching over 4 feet. It blooms from May to November, depending on location.

== Range and habitat ==
Deinandra paniculata is mainly native to Southern California and Baja California, from San Luis Obispo to south of Ensenada. However, there are some disjunct populations recorded in Monterey and San Mateo counties. It grows at low elevations in grassland, sage scrub, chaparral, woodland openings, and disturbed areas, often in sandy soils.
