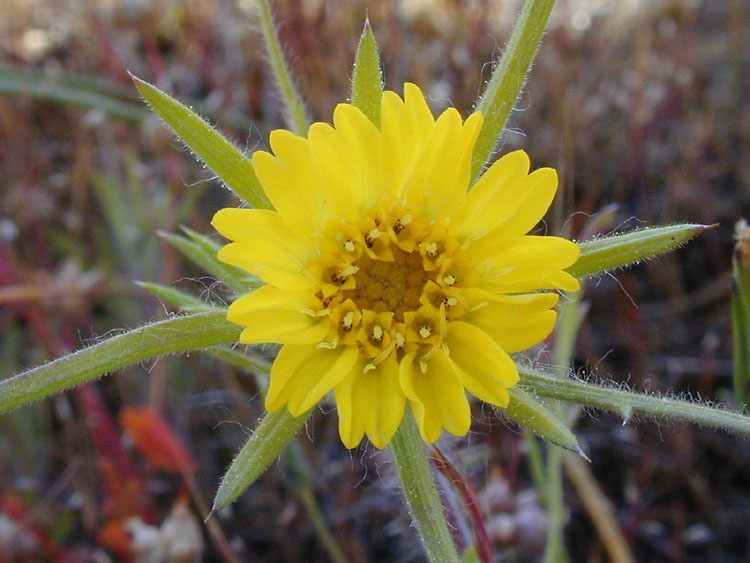

Scientific classification
- Kingdom: Plantae
- Clade: Tracheophytes
- Clade: Angiosperms
- Clade: Eudicots
- Clade: Asterids
- Order: Asterales
- Family: Asteraceae
- Genus: Centromadia
- Species: C. fitchii

Binomial name
- Centromadia fitchii (A.Gray) Greene

Synonyms
- Hemizonia fitchii A.Gray

= Centromadia fitchii =

Species of flowering plant

Centromadia fitchii, common name Fitch's spikeweed or Fitch's tarweed, is a species of North American plants in the tribe Madieae within the family Asteraceae. It is native to California and southwestern Oregon.

Centromadia fitchii is an herb up to 50 cm (20 inches) tall. It produces arrays of numerous yellow flower heads with both ray florets and disc florets.
