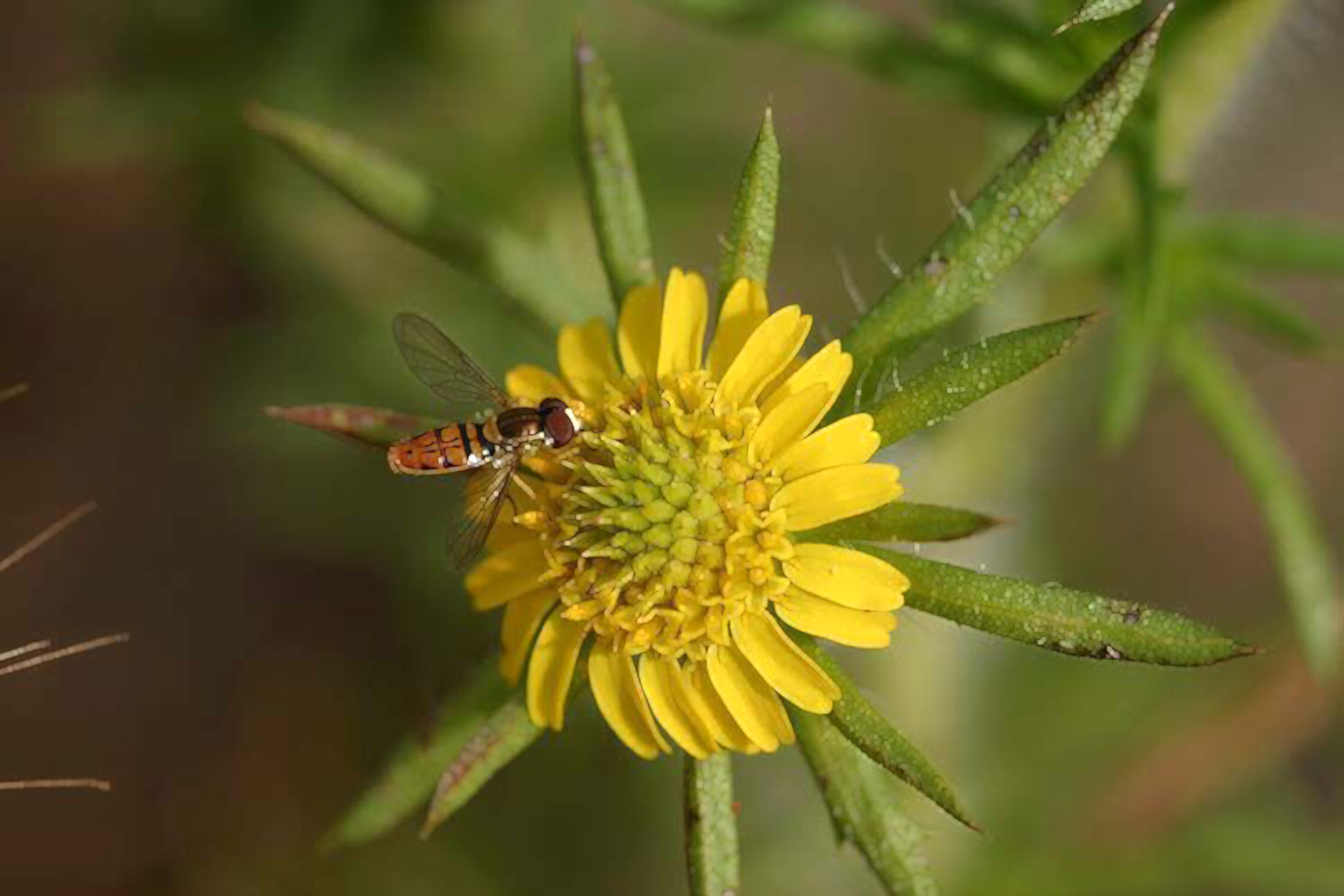

Scientific classification
- Kingdom: Plantae
- Clade: Tracheophytes
- Clade: Angiosperms
- Clade: Eudicots
- Clade: Asterids
- Order: Asterales
- Family: Asteraceae
- Genus: Centromadia
- Species: C. pungens

Binomial name
- Centromadia pungens (Hook. & Arn.) Greene

Synonyms
- Centromadia maritima Greene; Hartmannia pungens Hook. & Arn.; Hemizonia pungens (Hook. & Arn.) Torr. & A.Gray

= Centromadia pungens =

Species of flowering plant

Centromadia pungens, the common spikeweed or common tarweed, is a species of North American plants in the tribe Madieae within the family Asteraceae. It is native to northern Baja California and the western United States (California, Oregon, Washington, Idaho, Nevada, Arizona). The plant is considered a noxious weed in parts of the Pacific Northwest.

Centromadia pungens is an herb up to 120 cm (47 in) tall. It produces arrays of numerous yellow flower heads with both ray florets and disc florets.

Subspecies

- Centromadia pungens subsp. laevis (D.D.Keck) B.G.Baldwin - Baja California, southern California
- Centromadia pungens subsp. pungens - most of species range
