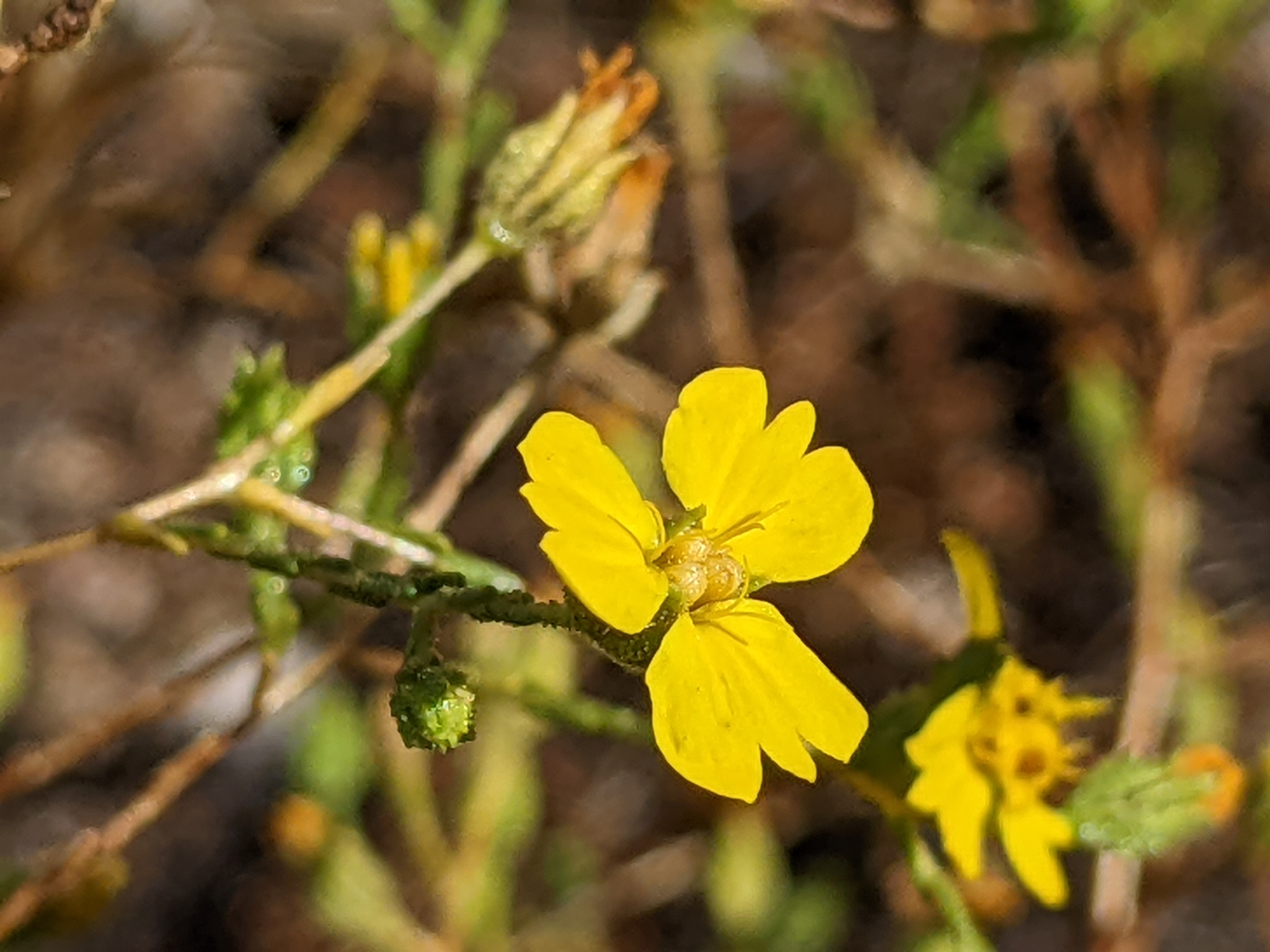

Scientific classification
- Kingdom: Plantae
- Clade: Tracheophytes
- Clade: Angiosperms
- Clade: Eudicots
- Clade: Asterids
- Order: Asterales
- Family: Asteraceae
- Genus: Deinandra
- Species: D. lobbii

Binomial name
- Deinandra lobbii (Greene) Greene

Synonyms
- Hemizonia lobbii Greene

= Deinandra lobbii =

Species of flowering plant

Deinandra lobbii, the threeray tarweed, is a North American species of plants in the tribe Madieae within the family Asteraceae.

== Distribution ==
The plant is endemic to California, though with a disjunct (discontinuous) distribution. It has been found in the northeastern part of the state (Modoc, Lassen, and Shasta Cos.) the San Francisco Bay region (Solano, Contra Costa, and Alameda Cos.) and west-central region (Monterey, San Benito, and northern San Luis Obispo Cos).

Calflora also reports a collection from Santa Clara County but this is from the central part of the campus of Stanford University, hence most likely a cultivated specimen.

== Description ==
Deinandra lobbii is an annual herb up to 70 cm (28 inches) tall.

It has numerous flower heads in a showy array. Each head has 3 (occasionally 4) yellow ray florets plus 3 (occasionally 4) disc florets with yellow corollas and red or dark purple anthers.
