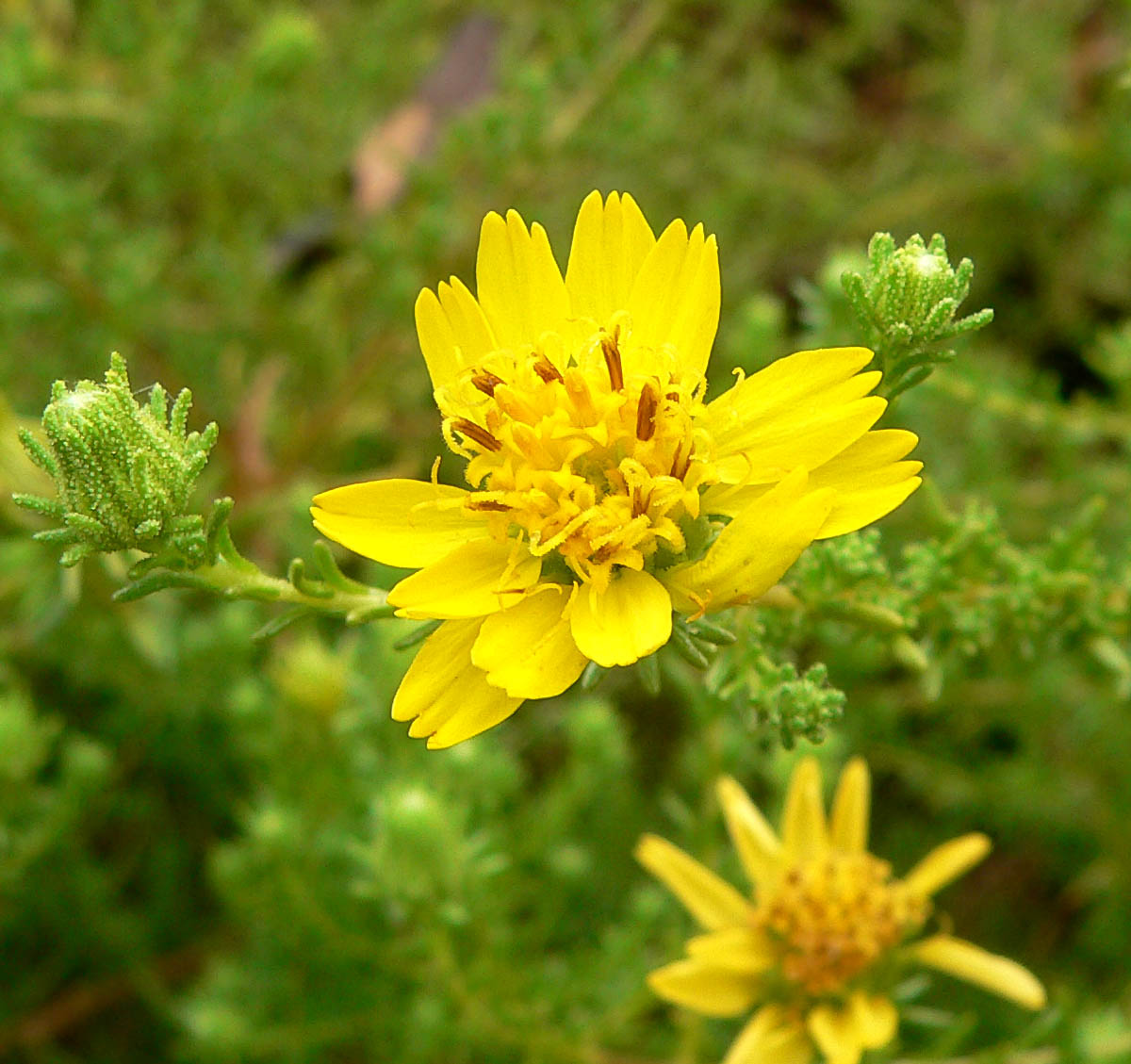
- Deinandra minthornii
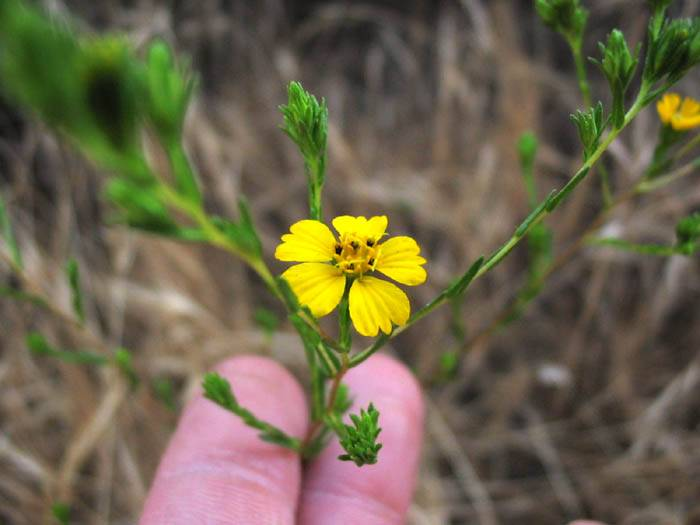
- Deinandra fasciculata

Scientific classification
- Kingdom: Plantae
- Clade: Tracheophytes
- Clade: Angiosperms
- Clade: Eudicots
- Clade: Asterids
- Order: Asterales
- Family: Asteraceae
- Subfamily: Asteroideae
- Tribe: Madieae
- Subtribe: Madiinae
- Genus: Deinandra; Greene

= Deinandra =

Genus of flowering plants

Deinandra is a genus of flowering plants in the tribe Madieae within the family Asteraceae. Such a genus is not recognized as distinct by all authorities; its species are often treated as members of the genus Hemizonia.

== Distribution ==
Deinandra plants are native to the Western United States (California and Arizona); and northwest Mexico (Baja California and Baja California Sur).

== Species ==
The following species are accepted in the genus Deinandra:

- Deinandra arida - Red Rock tarweed - Kern County, California
- Deinandra bacigalupii - Livermore tarweed - Alameda County, California
- Deinandra clementina - California
- Deinandra conjugens - Otay tarweed: Otay Mesa area in San Diego County, California and Baja California
- Deinandra corymbosa - California from Santa Barbara County to Humboldt County
- Deinandra fasciculata - clustered tarweed: southern California and Baja California
- Deinandra floribunda - California and Baja California
- Deinandra frutescens - Guadalupe Island, Mexico
- Deinandra greeneana - Baja California including Guadalupe Island
- Deinandra halliana - central California (Monterey, San Luis Obispo, Fresno, San Benito Counties)
- Deinandra increscens - grassland tarweed - central California (Monterey, San Luis Obispo, Santa Barbara Counties)
- Deinandra kelloggii - California (from Mendocino to Imperial Counties), Arizona (Pima County), Baja California
- Deinandra lobbii - central and northern California
- Deinandra martirensis - Baja California, Baja California Sur
- Deinandra minthornii - Santa Susana tarweed: California endemic in Santa Susana Mountains, Simi Hills, and Santa Monica Mountains of Southern California (Los Angeles and Ventura Counties). (State and CNPS listed 'rare species.')
- Deinandra mohavensis - Mojave tarweed - California (San Diego, Riverside, San Bernardino, Kern Counties)
- Deinandra pallida - California (from Solano County to Los Angeles County)
- Deinandra palmeri - Baja California
- Deinandra paniculata - California and Baja California
- Deinandra pentactis - central California (Monterey, San Luis Obispo, Kings, San Benito, Santa Clara, San Mateo Counties)
- Deinandra streetsii - Baja California
