= David D. Keck =

American botanist

David Daniels Keck (October 24, 1903 – March 10, 1995) was an American botanist who was notable for his work on angiosperm taxonomy and genetics.

Keck was born in Omaha, Nebraska. He completed undergraduate studies at Pomona College in 1925 and was awarded a Ph.D. in botany from the University of California in 1930.

From 1925 to 1950 he was based at the Carnegie Institution of Washington, at Stanford University, where he worked on plant species concepts with Jens Clausen and William Hiesey. In 1949, the three of them were co-recipients of the Mary Soper Pope Memorial Award in botany.

In 1950 he was appointed head curator of the New York Botanical Garden and remained there until 1958.

In 1959, he co-published A California Flora with Philip A. Munz.

He was Program Director for Systematic Biology at the National Science Foundation until 1970, after which he moved to New Zealand. He returned to the United States in 1978 and lived in Medford, Oregon.
