= Lacamas Prairie Natural Area =

Protected prairie in Washington state, USA

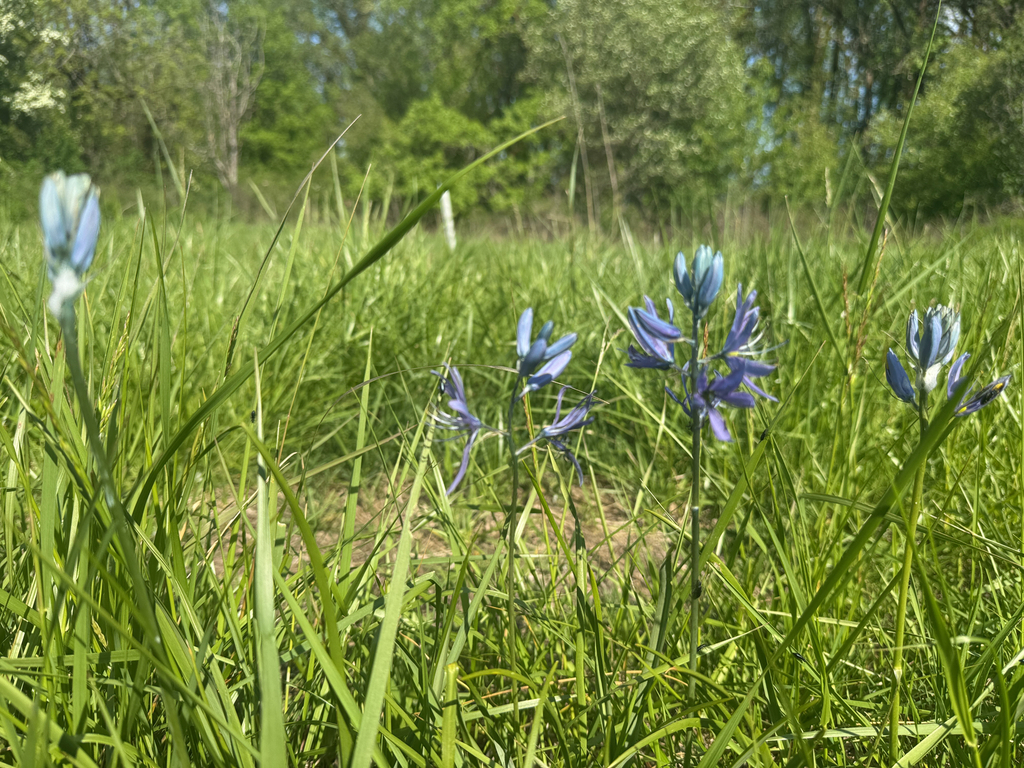
- Camassia quamash blooming at Lacamas Prairie in 2025

- Location within Washington (state) Location within the United States
- Coordinates: 45.6425°N 122.4586°W
- Area: 211 acres (85 ha)
- Established: 2007
- Owner: Washington Department of Natural Resources

Lacamas Prairie Natural Area is a Washington Natural Area in Clark County, Washington. It encompasses the combined 211 acres (85 ha) of Lacamas Prairie Natural Area Preserve and Lacamas Prairie Natural Resources Conservation Area.

The natural area serves to protect the Willamette Valley wet prairie ecosystem, as well as the Oregon white oak and Oregon ash forests surrounding the prairie.

== Conservation ==
Lacamas Prairie Natural Resources Conservation Area/Natural Area was first established in 2007 following land acquisition by Washington Department of Natural Resources (DNR), which continues to administer the combined units. DNR aims to conserve the total 1,622 acres (656 ha) of prairie in the area. In addition to the DNR owned lands, 244 acres (99 ha) are owned and protected by Clark County, and an additional 14 acres (5.7 ha) are owned by Columbia Land Trust. The remaining land is privately owned. Between 2019 and 2021, DNR was granted $6.3 million by the state of Washington for the purposes of land acquisition and stewardship for Lacamas Prairie.

DNR periodically performs prescribed burns to maintain the prairie ecosystem and reduce populations of invasive species.

== Ecology ==
The prairie is home to one of the largest known populations of the endangered Bradshaw's lomatium. It is the location of one of only five known populations of tall western penstemon, and represents the sole population in Washington. Other sensitive species of the prairie include Oregon coyote-thistle, Hall's aster, dense sedge, Nuttall's quillwort, and small-flowered trillium.

== See also ==
- Quamash Prairie Natural Area – a similar Willamette Valley wet prairie located on the Tualatin River in Oregon
