= Native American use of fire in ecosystems =

Natural resource management technique

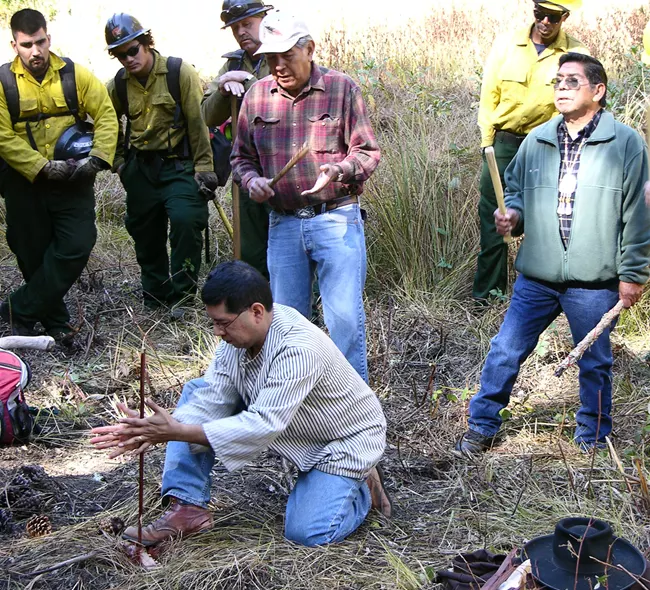
Members of Yosemite Fire look on as members of the Southern Sierra Miwuk Nation engage in a ceremony and traditional methods to ignite a prescribed fire

Prior to the European colonization of the Americas, indigenous peoples used fire to modify the landscape. This influence over the fire regime was part of the environmental cycles and maintenance of wildlife habitats that sustained the cultures and economies of the Indigenous peoples of the Americas. What was initially perceived by colonists as "untouched, pristine" wilderness in North America was the cumulative result of the indigenous cultural burning, creating a mosaic of grasslands and forests across North America, sustained and managed by the peoples indigenous to the landscape.

Radical disruption of indigenous burning practices occurred with European colonization and the forced relocation of those who had historically maintained the landscape. Some colonists understood the traditional use and benefits of low-intensity broadcast burns ("Indian-type" fires), but others feared and suppressed them. By the 1880s, the impacts of colonization had devastated indigenous populations, and fire exclusion had become more widespread. By the early 20th century, fire suppression had become the official US federal policy.

Understanding pre-colonization land management and the traditional knowledge held by the indigenous peoples who practice it provides an important basis for current re-engagement with the landscape and is critical for the correct interpretation of the ecological basis for vegetation distribution.

== Human-shaped landscape ==
Prior to the arrival of Europeans, Native Americans played a major role in determining the diversity of their ecosystems.

The most significant type of environmental change brought about by Pre-Columbian human activity was the modification of vegetation. [...] Vegetation was primarily altered by the clearing of forest and by intentional burning. Natural fires certainly occurred but varied in frequency and strength in different habitats. Anthropogenic fires, for which there is ample documentation, tended to be more frequent but weaker, with a different seasonality than natural fires, and thus had a different type of influence on vegetation. The result of clearing and burning was, in many regions, the conversion of forest to grassland, savanna, scrub, open woodland, and forest with grassy openings. (William M. Denevan)

The benefits of forest management have been seen throughout history, and natives knew the dangers of letting forests become overly dense. Fire was used to keep large areas of forest and mountains free of undergrowth for hunting or travel. It also was a tool to help manage natural resources such as food. Fire was used in warfare for the protection of settlements

Authors such as William Henry Hudson, Henry Wadsworth Longfellow, Francis Parkman, and Henry David Thoreau contributed to the widespread myth that pre-Columbian North America was a pristine, natural wilderness, "a world of barely perceptible human disturbance." At the time of these writings, however, enormous tracts of land had already been allowed to succeed to climax due to the reduction in anthropogenic fires after the depopulation of native peoples from epidemics of diseases introduced by Europeans in the 16th century, forced relocation, and warfare.

== Grasslands and savannas ==
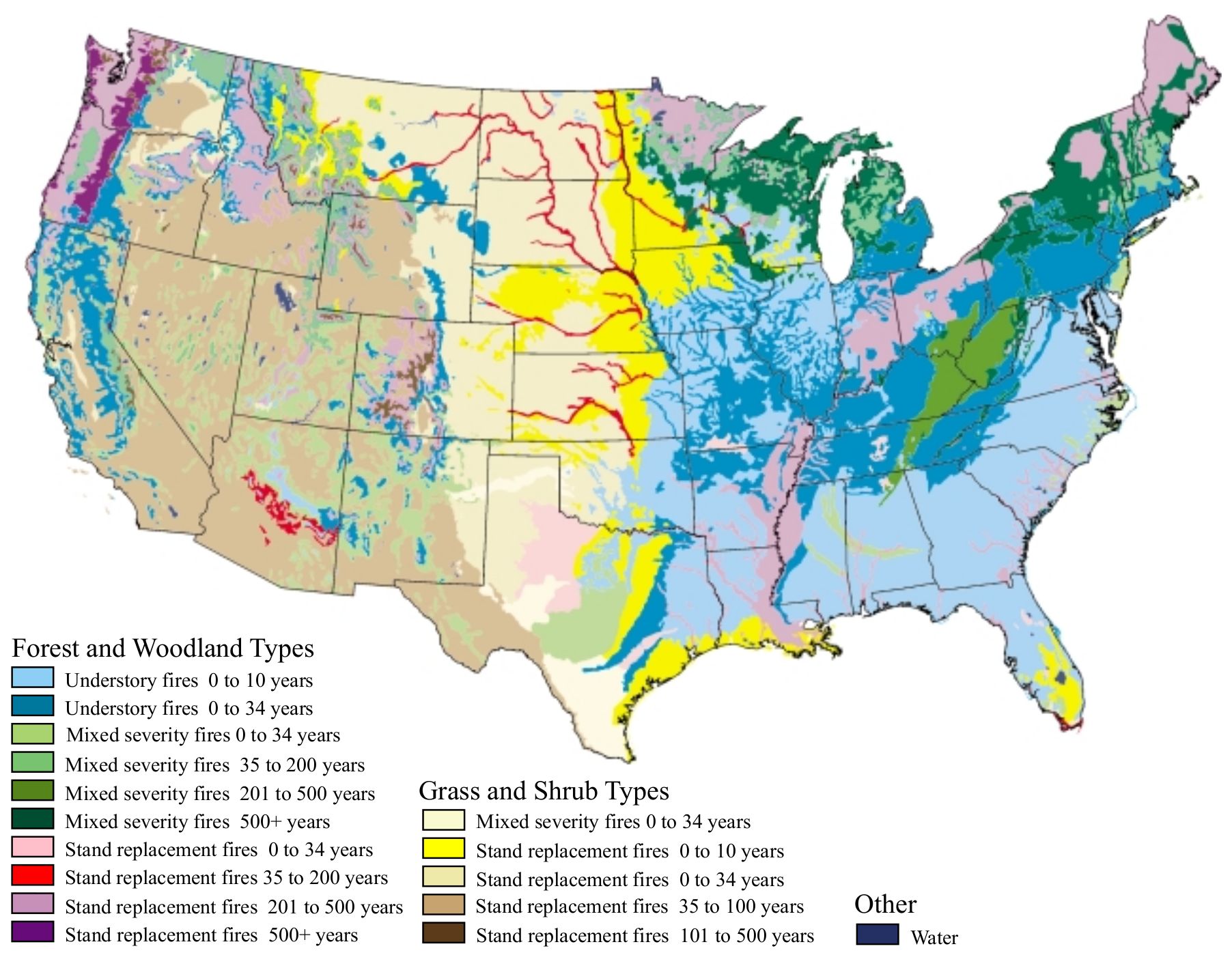
Fire regimes of United States plants. Savannas have regimes of a few years: blue, pink, and light green areas.

When first encountered by Europeans, many ecosystems were the result of repeated fires every one to three years, resulting in the replacement of forests with grassland or savanna, or opening up the forest by removing undergrowth. Terra preta soils, created by slow burning, are found mainly in the Amazon basin, where estimates of the area covered range from 0.1 to 0.3%, or 6,300 to 18,900 km^{2} of low forested Amazonia to 1.0% or more.

In the Klamath Valley region of northern California, the frequent and low-intensity fire of cultural burns are key to keeping grasslands open that otherwise would be invaded by conifers, which are less fire tolerant than the native oak. In the Pacific Northwest, the implementation of cultural burning led by tribal practitioners has been found to facilitate the growth of culturally important plants such as camas, yampa, and tarweed. Camas, yampa, and tarweed are all plants that have been part to several tribes' diets. The Blackfoot, Cree, and Nez Perce tribes would eat the bulbs of the Common Camas (Camassia quamash), which could be steamed or dried to make flour. Yampa, part of the genus Perideridia and also known as wild carrots, are harvested by the Yokut tribe of the San Joaquin Valley, California. The seeds of tarweed are also edible, described as "rich as butter." Burning to keep grasslands open can provide space for diverse flora that grow in very few places, found in the diversity of prairies, like the western lily and Howell's triteleia.

There is some argument about the effect of human-caused burning when compared to lightning in western North America. Eyewitness accounts of extensive pre-settlement prairie in the 1600s, and the rapid conversion of extensive prairie areas to woodland on settlement, combined with accounts of the efforts made to make indigenous prairie burning practices illegal in Canada and the US, all point to widespread pre-settlement control of fire with the intent to maintain and expand prairie areas.

As Emily Russell (1983) has pointed out, "There is no strong evidence that Indians purposely burned large areas....The presence of Indians did, however, undoubtedly increase the frequency of fires above the low numbers caused by lightning." As might be expected, Indian fire use had its greatest impact "in local areas near Indian habitations." John E. Keeley (2002) theorized Native American burning in the coastal ranges of central and southern California subsidized natural lightning ignitions to the extent that landscape patterns of grassland and open shrub land were significantly increased. "Intact shrub lands provided limited resources for native Americans and thus there was ample motivation for using fire to degrade this vegetation to an open mosaic of shrub lands/grassland

== Reasons for and benefits of burning ==
Reasons given for intentional burns in pre-contact ecosystems are numerous. They include:

- Facilitating agriculture by rapidly recycling mineral-rich ash and biomass.
- Increasing nut production in wild/wildcrafted orchards by darkening the soil layer with carbonized leaf litter, decreasing localized albedo, and increasing the average temperature in spring, when nut flowers and buds would be sensitive to late frosts.
- Promoting the regrowth of fire-adapted food and utility plants by initiating seed germination or coppicing – shrub species like osier, willow, hazel, Rubus, and others have their lifespan extended and productivity increased through controlled cutting (burning) of branch stems.
- Facilitating hunting by clearing underbrush and fallen limbs, allowing for more silent passage and stalking through the forest, as well as increasing visibility of game and clear avenues for projectiles.
- Burning helps to create an environmental context within which more localized burning could then be conducted for specific cultural purposes.
- Facilitating travel by reducing impassible brambles, underbrush and thickets.
- Assisting in pollination by several species, such as hummingbirds, bees, butterflies benefit from burned soil and charred wood which can serve as spots to nest. The California Tortoiseshell butterfly (Nymphalis californica) and the Ceanothus silk moth (Hyalophora euryalus) are two specific examples of pollinators that can help for some culturally significant plants thrive in intentionally burned land.
- Increasing the local biodiversity in the understory of forest. Burning has been found to be beneficial in increasing the biodiversity found in the grasslands created beneath the understory of oak tree groves, bringing a greater presence of reptiles, amphibians and small mammals, and the density of blueberry bushes has been found to be benefit from prescribed burning as well.
- Reinforcing an ecosystem's ability to withstand encroachment of invasive species, which can push out native species.
- Decreasing the risk of larger scale, catastrophic fires which consume decades of built-up fuel.
- Increasing population of game animals by creating habitat in grasslands or increasing understory habitat of fire-adapted grass forage (in other words, wildcrafted pasturage) for deer, lagomorphs, bison, extinct grazing megafauna like mammoths, rhinoceros, camelids and others, the nearly extinct prairie chicken; and the populations of nut-consuming species like rodents, turkey and bear and notably the passenger pigeon through increased nut production (above); as well as the populations of their predators, i.e. mountain lions, lynx, bobcats, wolves, etc.
- Increasing the frequency of regrowth of beneficial food and medicine plants, like clearing-adapted species like cherry, plum, and others. Beargrass is a culturally significant member of the Liliaceae family, and the leaves that are produced from a year to three years after being treated with fire are the high quality that are useful to the Karuk people Northern California for traditional basketry.
- Decreasing tick and biting insect populations by destroying overwintering instars and eggs.
- In chaparrals, burning was used as a way to control pests and pathogens that affected the culturally significant plants found there.
- Increasing streamflow due to reduction of evapotranspiration by plants.
- Rivers cooled by smoke density alert salmon that they may begin upstream migration.
- Religious practices - setting fire to attract fair weather, to bring rain, to "call" salmon back from the ocean
- Seed supporting areas were burned to facilitate harvesting, stimulate seed production, protect the perennial stock, replenish the annual stock, recycle nutrients, and remove detritus to allow for new growth.

== Impacts of European settlement ==
By the time that European explorers first arrived in North America, millions of acres of "natural" landscapes were already manipulated and maintained for human use. Fires indicated the presence of humans to many European explorers and settlers arriving on ship. In San Pedro Bay in 1542, chaparral fires provided that signal to Juan Rodríguez Cabrillo, and later to others across all of what would be named California. In the American west, it is estimated that 456,500 acres (184,737 ha) burned annually pre-settlement in what is now Oregon and Washington.

By the 17th century, native populations were greatly affected by the genocidal structure of settler colonialism. Many colonists often either deliberately set wildfires and/or allowed out of control fires to "run free." Also, sheep and cattle owners, as well as shepherds and cowboys, often set the alpine meadows and prairies on fire at the end of the grazing season to burn the dried grasses, reduce brush, and kill young trees, as well as encourage the growth of new grasses for the following summer and fall grazing season. Native people were forced off their traditional landbases or killed, and traditional land management practices were eventually made illegal by settler governance.

By the 19th century, many indigenous nations had been forced to sign treaties with the federal government and relocate to reservations, which were sometimes hundreds of miles away from their ancestral homelands. In addition to violent and forced removal, fire suppression would become part of colonial methods of removal and genocide. As sociologist Kari Norgaard has shown, "Fire suppression was mandated by the very first session of the California Legislature in 1850 during the apex of genocide in the northern part of the state."

For example, the Karuk peoples of Northern California "burn [the forest] to enhance the quality of forest food species like elk, deer, acorns, mushrooms, and lilies, as well as basketry materials such as hazel and willow, but also keep travel routes open." When such relationships to their environment were made illegal through fire suppression, it would have dramatic consequences on their methods of relating to one another, their environment, their food sources, and their educational practices. Thus, many scholars have argued that fire suppression can be seen as a form of "colonial ecological violence" which results in particular risks and harms experienced by native peoples and communities.

Through the turn of the 20th century, settlers continued to use fire to clear the land of brush and trees in order to make new farm land for crops and new pastures for grazing animals—the North American variation of slash and burn technology—while others deliberately burned to reduce the threat of major fires—the so‑called "light burning" technique. Light burning is also been called "Paiute forestry," a direct but derogatory reference to southwestern tribal burning habits. The ecological impacts of settler fires were vastly different than those of their Native American predecessors. Cultural burning practices were functionally made illegal with the passage of the Weeks Act in 1911.

== Modern management ==
Removal of indigenous populations and their controlled burning practices have resulted in major ecological changes, including increased severity of wild fires, especially in combination with climate change. Attitudes towards Native American-type burning have shifted in recent times, and Tribal agencies and organizations, now with fewer restrictions placed on them, have resumed their traditional use of fire practices in a modern context by reintroducing fire to fire-adapted ecosystems, on and adjacent to, tribal lands. Many foresters and ecologists have also recognized the importance of native fire practices. They are now learning from traditional fire practitioners and using controlled burns to reduce fuel accumulations, change species composition, and manage vegetation structure and density for healthier forests and rangelands.

Fire was used as a technological tool for natives and its use in controlled burns. According to Dave Roos, an author for the History Channel on Native American news, he ascertained that fire was viewed as a science. Yosemite is a clear example of how indigenous used controlled burns to clear brush in order to provide nutrient rich soil for woodland crop growth. Fire has always had a medicine type feeling with the indigenous and medicine is best used when it's given at the perfect time.

Forest management includes but is not limited to controlled burns, selective thinning, and reforestation. Fire agencies across the US have adopted these tactics. Some are drawing on Native American oral history and traditional ecological knowledge to revive them. Native Americans in California and Australia have known the risk of overgrown forests for millennia and used these tactics to prevent wildfires and encourage beneficial plant growth. Controlled burns help cut back the organic fuel in uncontrolled forests. Native Americans used wood for small scale fires to clear brush from in between the trees of a forest in order to limit the possibility of an uncontrolled forest fire.

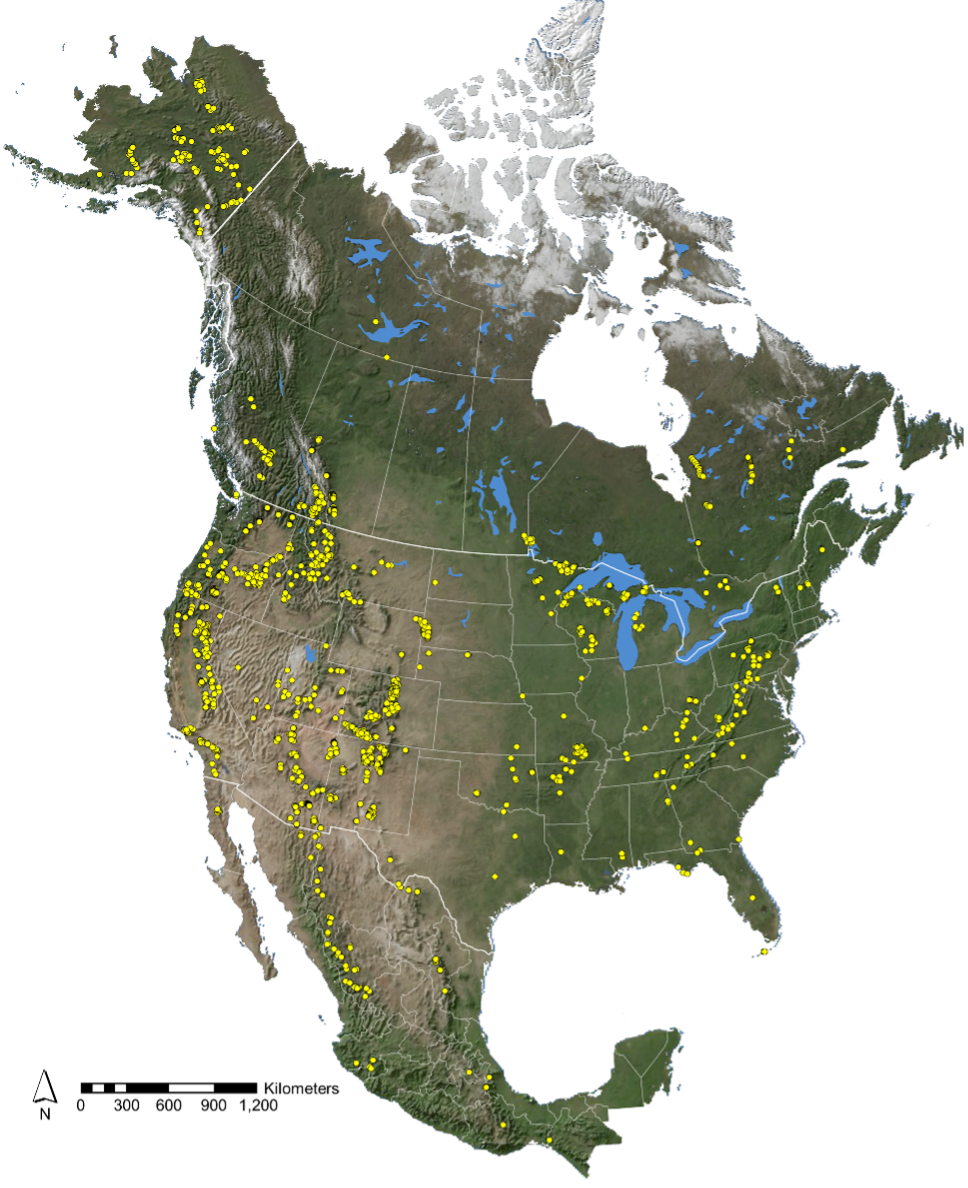
Map of North American fire scar network. The yellow dots represent sites where trees have been found with fire scars in their tree rings, which allow scientist to determine the historical frequency of fires.

Selective thinning allows for old thin trees to be replaced by more pyrophytic plants or plants that benefit from fire. Pyrophyte vegetation are plants and trees that have formed the ability to resist the effects of fire. Native Americans had a method of forest thinning with their understanding of which plants would be at highest risk of burning during fire season. They would dig the plants out and or burn them off individually.

Indigenous communities and tribes are partnering with other agencies to practice traditional land management, including the utilization of cultural burning. In the example of Quamash Prairie Natural Area in Oregon, the Confederated Tribes of Grand Ronde collaborate with Oregon Metro to burn the prairie periodically for the purposes of cultivating and harvesting camas.

== Archaeological studies ==
Studies made by U.C. Berkeley concluded that fire has greatly influenced forest vegetation over the last few decades. The 1990 to 2014 study tracked some of the most destructive wildfires, showing human intervention has always existed regarding forest management, and native people played a vital role in the forest's survival.

Several forms of evidence are collected when researching the history of cultural fire.

- Charcoal data: this includes both observing the frequency and quantity of charcoal in sediment layers, as well as analysis of the charcoal to determine its plant origins.
- Pollen data: pollen in the sediment is used to determine which plants existed at given times. Pollen is microscopic but lasts a long time in the soil. When studying fire, researchers observe pollen types and quantity in relation to charcoal in the sediment.
- Dendroecological data: dendrochronology is a method used to determine the age and health of a tree by observing the rings within its trunk. This method can be employed to determine fire frequency because trees will develop burn scars that appear on the rings.
- Phytolith Data: Measurements of phytolith content in surface deposits may indicate the appearance of past grasslands in landscapes.

=== California ===
Californian Indigenous groups stopped burning due to the Spanish banning the practice and the loss of manpower due to the forced labor on missions, ranchos, and pueblos. Following this development, fire incidence decreased at sites across the state.

California's Native population has a cultural and dietary reliance on plants that must be maintained by burning. One cultural example is the hazel bush, used for weaving baskets, mainly baskets that carry newborn babies. The baskets must be woven with straight branches, and they need to be burned to do so. Acorns and salmon, which are native food sources, are also affected by Indigenous-prescribed burns. Burning was similarly useful in California for many food plants with edible parts—bulbs, leaves, fruits, and seeds. These plants appeared in open woods, meadows, prairies, or grasslands in California, and required systematic burning to keep their populations healthy and abundant.

Don L Hankins conducted a study to understand the effects of Indigenous prescribed burning on different aspects of riparian fauna. They found a generally positive impact and concluded that prescribed burnings are important for maintaining the biodiversity of riparian ecosystems. This study showed that prescribed fires maintained the richness of the area. Fire burns are particularly needed to sustain native plant species. They increased the proportion of native plants to non-native plants and the richness of native plants. Fall burning, in particular, increased overall and native richness. On the other hand, fires in the spring only affected the richness of native species and did not impact non-native species.

Another study of California's Quiroste Valley was conducted using visible plant remains (macrobotanical), charcoal or ash (anthracological), and local ecological data. The study found that the low frequency of lightning in the area, along with the presence of high amounts of grass-like plants and plants which thrive in post fire environments, indicates a history of anthropogenic burnings in the area. Two potential factors that were not able to be accounted for in this study was the frequency of lightning in the past, as they assumed it to be similar to modern day lightning frequency and used modern day data for their conclusions, and the potential for a different climate encouraging different plants to grow.

=== Kentucky ===
Research conducted by Paul Delcort at Cliff Palace Pond (Jackson County) pioneered the study of anthropogenic fires in the United States using archaeological techniques. These studies looked at pollen and charcoal sediment samples to chart fires over time. The study found that between 1000 BCE and 1800 CE there was increased charcoal concentrations, suggesting frequent low severity fires. During this same period there was an increase in pollen from fire adapted tree species such as oak, chestnut, and hickory. There was also an increase in pollen from sunflowers and goosefoot in forest areas which may suggest that there was food production in burned ecosystems. The studies found that fires which coincided with human habitation prior to fire suppression resulted in a diverse patchwork ecosystem with many plants that could be used by humans.

=== Massachusetts ===
A study of sites in Stockbridge, Massachusetts, that were inhabited from 3000 BCE to 1000 CE found that the precedence of low severity landscape fires was correlated with periods of habitation by looking at charcoal sentiment samples. The research found that periods of intense burning were correlated with increases in chestnut trees through looking at fossilized pollen samples. The study did not find any archaeological evidence that the fires were intentionally set, but a combination of historic accounts from the region, the correlation with habitation, and the incentive for burning to increase nut producing trees, it is likely that these were anthropogenic fires.

=== New Mexico ===
A study of the anthropological use of fire in the Jemez Mountains was conducted using charcoal samples in the soil and fire scars in tree rings. The study found that increases in low severity ecological fires were positively correlated with population changes, rather than climate changes. The study also found, from fungal evidence, that there were more herbivores present at times of increased burning and that the fires that occurred during the period of ancient settlement were less severe than modern wildfires in the region.

=== Tennessee ===
A study of charcoal and pollen deposits in the Cumberland Plateau of Tennessee found regular anthropological fires were occurring from 3,000 years ago to 200 years ago. However, the study found no evidence that the fires changed the overall vegetation that was present in the region.

=== West Virginia ===
A paleoarchealogical study of the Ohio River Valley in West Virginia found that ecosystems experienced coevolution with humans due to land management practices. The study concluded that these practices included burning and land clearing. They found that these practices altered soil carbon cycling and the diversity of plant species. They found that the use of fire decreased biomass, increased charcoal abundance, and potentially led to more usable vegetation.

== See also ==
- Fire-stick farming
- Bushfire
- Fire ecology
- Pyrogeography
