= Quamash Prairie Natural Area =

Protected prairie in Oregon, USA

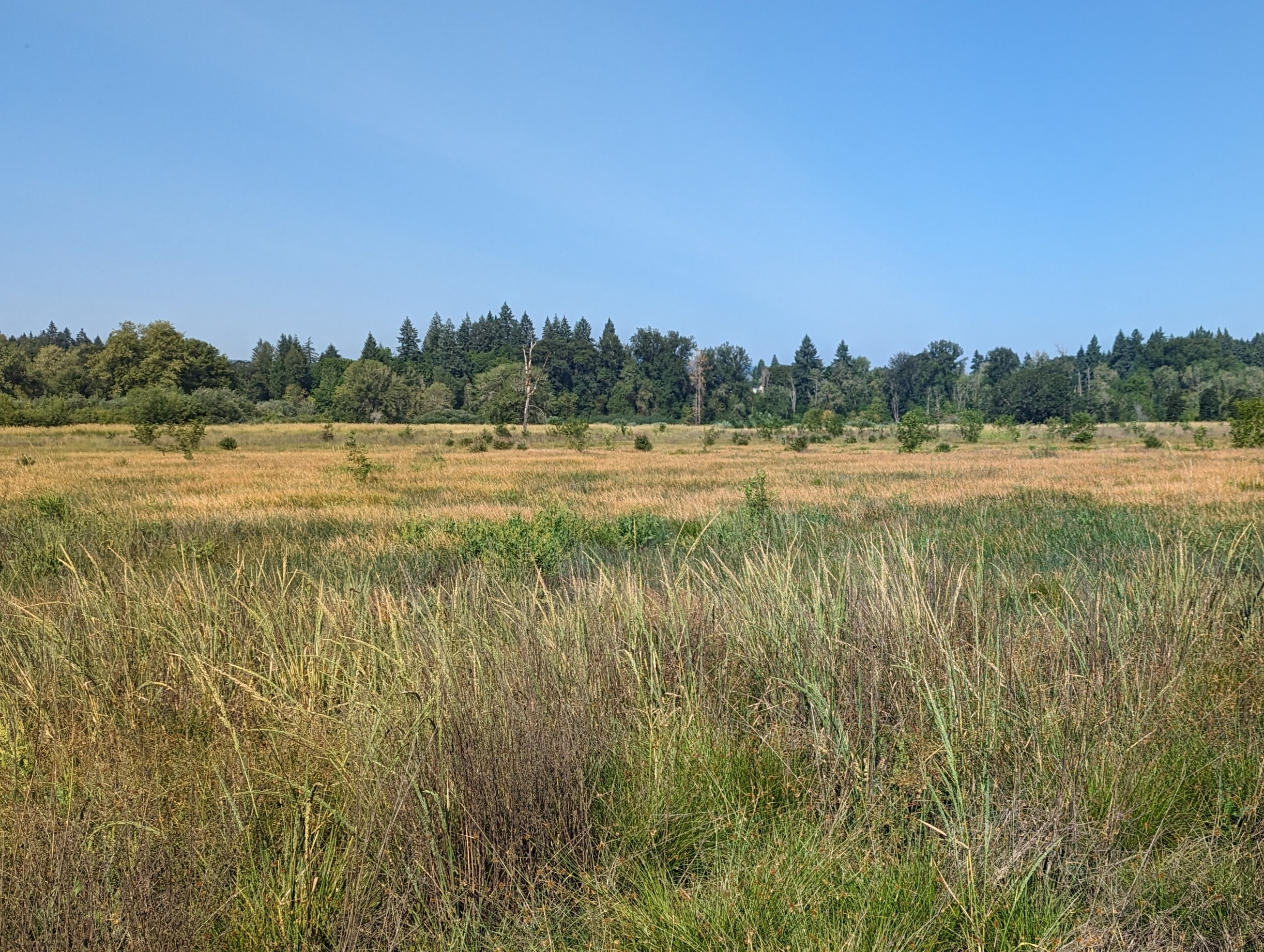
- Quamash Prairie, July 2023

- Location within Oregon Location within the United States
- Location: Washington County, Oregon
- Nearest city: Tigard, Oregon
- Coordinates: 45.4056475°N 122.9346455°W
- Area: 160 acres (65 ha)
- Established: 1996
- Owner: Oregon Metro

Quamash Prairie Natural Area is a 160-acre protected wet prairie in Washington County, Oregon and bounded by the Tualatin River. It is co-administered by Oregon Metro and the Confederated Tribes of Grand Ronde. It is specifically managed as a camas prairie.

== History ==
Quamash Prairie is part of the ancestral homelands of the Tualatin Kalapuya, a tribe affiliated with the Confederated Tribes of Grand Ronde. The prairie is known for its dense crop of Camassia quamash (known as camas or quamash), an important first food. The specific population of plants found at Quamash Prairie was likely cultivated before western colonization.

The area later became known as Gotter Bottom. It had been used to grow crops and as pastureland. Metro acquired the first 115 acres of farmland to begin prairie restoration in 1996, establishing Quamash Prairie Natural Area. The second 45-acre parcel of adjacent pasture was purchased and integrated in 2006.

The land is cooperatively managed by both Oregon Metro and the Indigenous community. Tribal members utilize the land to cultivate and harvest quamash plants, and for other cultural activities.

== Characteristics ==
As part of a floodplain of the Tualatin River, the prairie is seasonally inundated. Water levels may reach up to 4 feet deep. The mixed aquatic, wooded, and open spaces provide diverse habitat for many species of birds.

It is the location of one of only five known populations of tall western penstemon.

== Restoration ==
The prairie has been reestablished through the use of prescribed burns and cultural burns, as burning reduces the encroachment of woody species and weeds. It also provides the opportunity for the cultural harvesting of tarweed seeds. As bulbs of the quamash plant are consumed by tribal members, herbicide use as a management tool has been discouraged.

== See also ==
- Lacamas Prairie Natural Area – a similar Willamette Valley wet prairie located near Lacamas Lake in Washington
