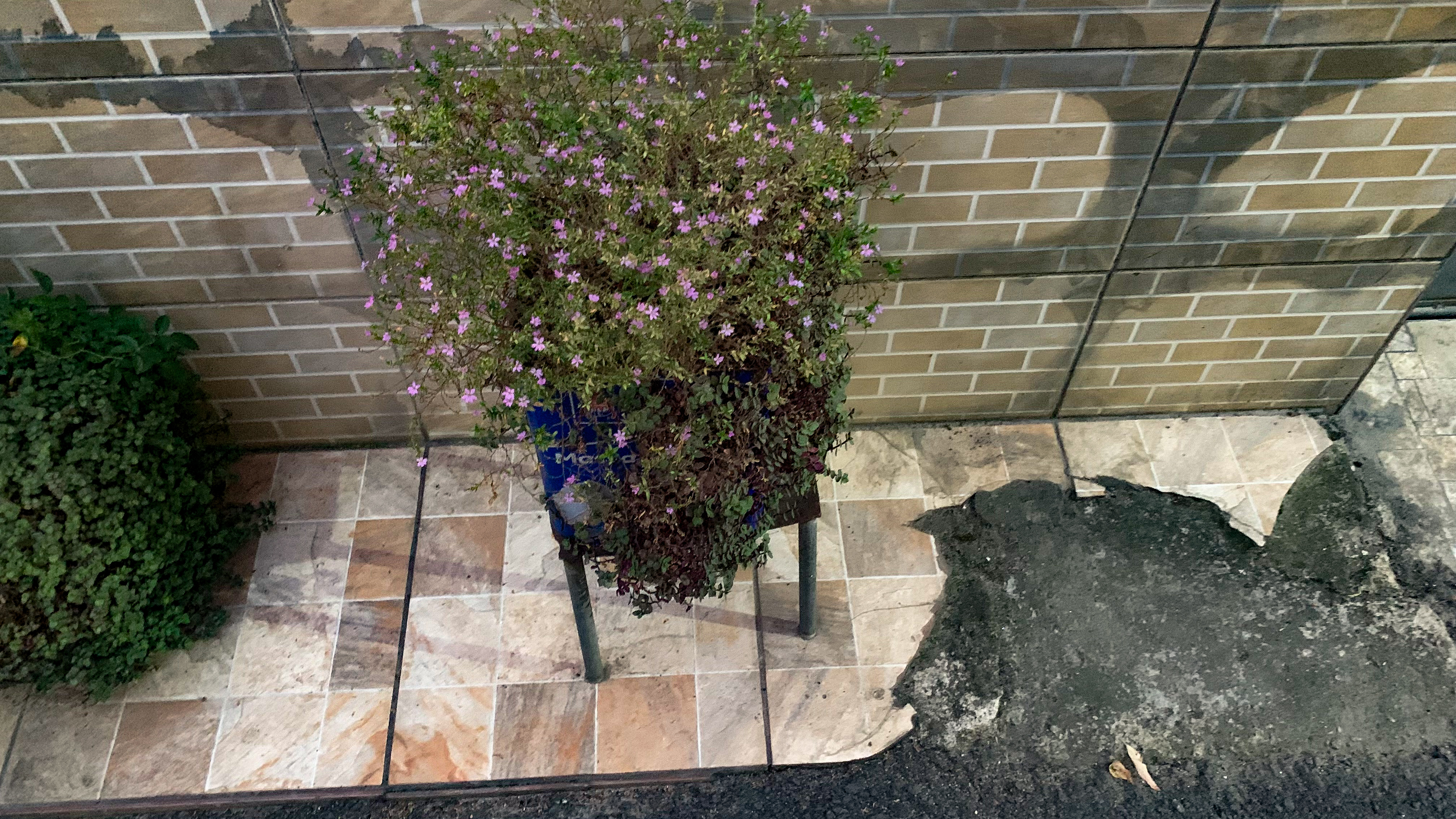

Scientific classification
- Kingdom: Plantae
- Clade: Tracheophytes
- Clade: Angiosperms
- Clade: Eudicots
- Clade: Rosids
- Order: Myrtales
- Family: Lythraceae
- Genus: Cuphea
- Species: C. gracilis

Binomial name
- Cuphea gracilis Kunth

= Cuphea gracilis =

Species of plant

Cuphea gracilis is a perennial herbaceous plant in the genus Cuphea of the family Lythraceae. This species is native to Brazil.

Cuphea gracilis grows to a height of 20 to 30 cm.
