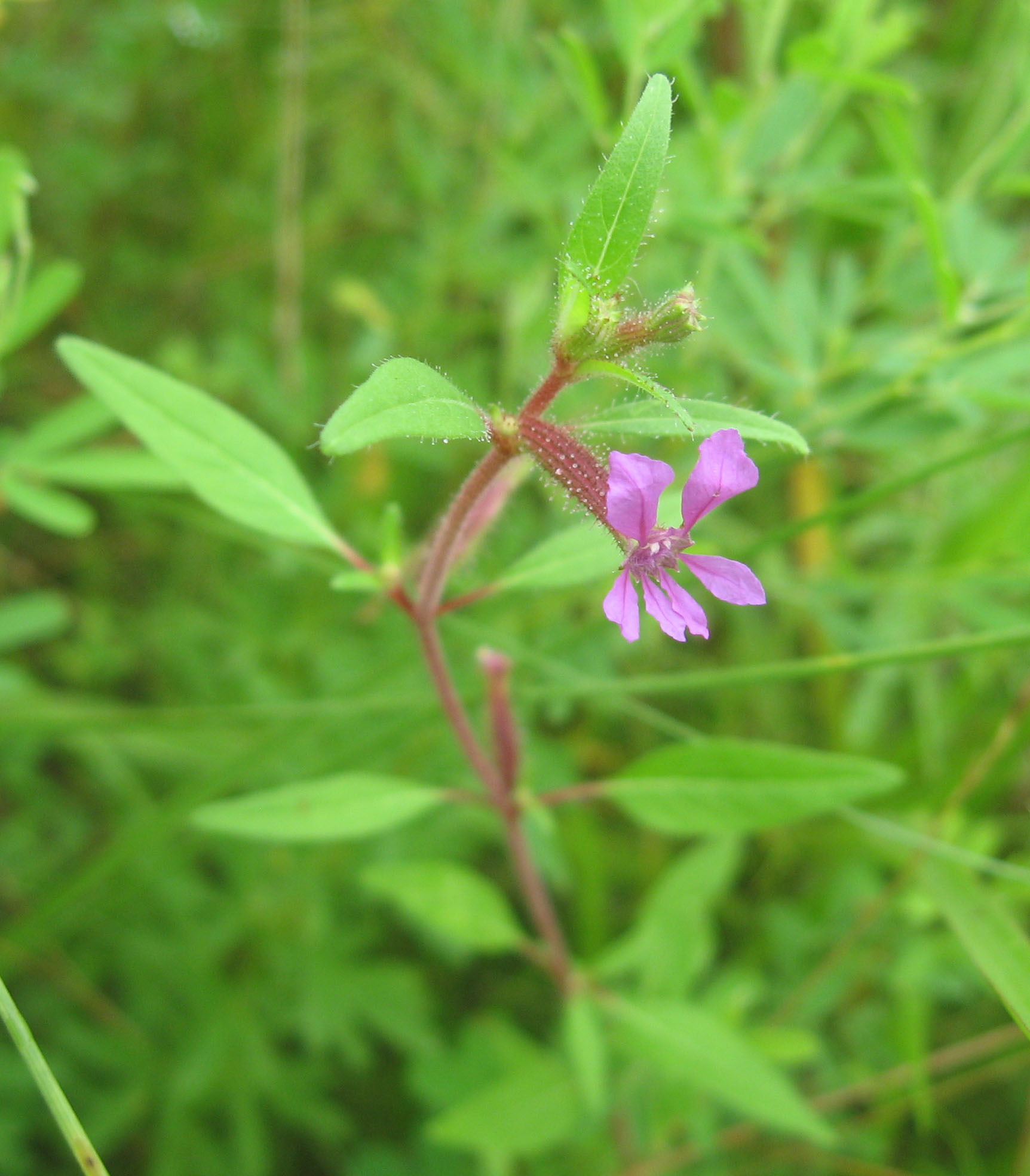

Scientific classification
- Kingdom: Plantae
- Clade: Tracheophytes
- Clade: Angiosperms
- Clade: Eudicots
- Clade: Rosids
- Order: Myrtales
- Family: Lythraceae
- Genus: Cuphea
- Species: C. viscosissima

Binomial name
- Cuphea viscosissima Jacq.

Synonyms
- Cuphea petiolata (L.) Koehne; Lythrum petiolatum L.; Parsonsia petiolata (L.) Rusby

= Cuphea viscosissima =

Species of flowering plant

Cuphea viscosissima, also known as waxbush, blue waxweed, clammy cuphea or (ambiguously) as "tarweed", is an herbaceous plant in the loosestrife family. It native to the eastern United States, where it is most often found in open, rocky calcareous areas. It is the most common and widespread Cuphea in the U.S.

This species is notable for its sticky stems. It produces a purple-red flower in late summer. Flowers attract butterflies and hummingbirds.

This species is morphological similar to Cuphea lanceolata, which is found in Mexico. It can be distinguished from Cuphea lanceolata by its smaller flower.
