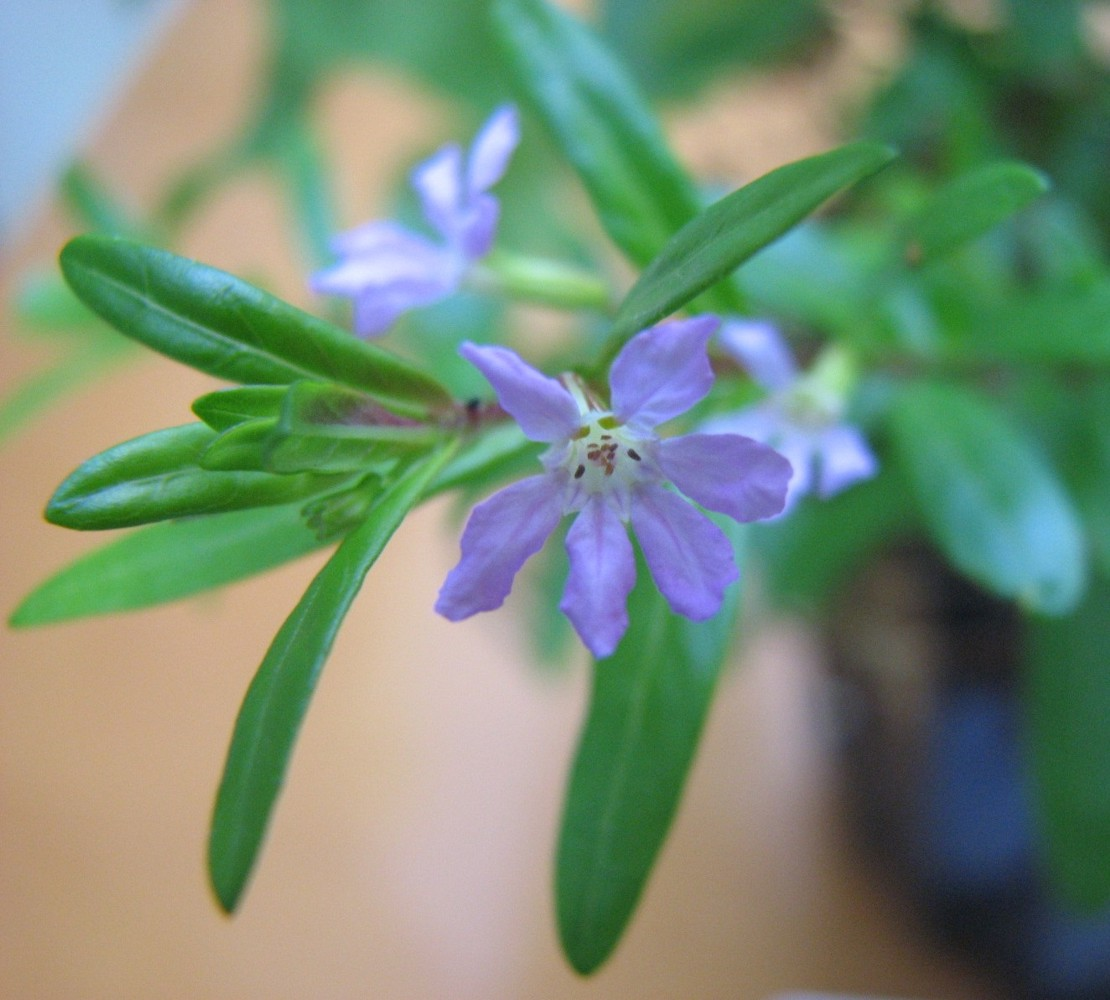

Scientific classification
- Kingdom: Plantae
- Clade: Embryophytes
- Clade: Tracheophytes
- Clade: Angiosperms
- Clade: Eudicots
- Clade: Rosids
- Order: Myrtales
- Family: Lythraceae
- Genus: Cuphea
- Species: C. hyssopifolia

Binomial name
- Cuphea hyssopifolia Kunth

= Cuphea hyssopifolia =

Species of flowering plant

Cuphea hyssopifolia, the false heather, Mexican heather, Hawaiian heather or elfin herb, is a small evergreen shrub native to Mexico, Guatemala, and Honduras.

== Description ==
It grows to about 60 cm (24 in) high by 90 cm (35 in) wide and has purple, lavender or white coloured flowers and fine foliage. Its leaves are small, narrow and dark green. The fruit is a capsule that contains small globose seeds.

The Latin specific epithet hyssopifolia (which also occurs in several other plant names, including that of Bassia hyssopifolia) means "hyssop-leafed", referring to the fine, narrow leaves of that plant.

== Habitat ==
It is present in hot, semi-warm and temperate climates between 500 and 2,240 meters (1,640 and 7,350 ft) above sea level. An ornamental plant grown in orchards and gardens, it grows on the banks of streams, associated with disturbed vegetation of tropical deciduous and sub-deciduous forests, as well as mountain mesophilic forest.

The species is naturalised in Hawaii, and regarded as a serious weed there.

== Cultivation ==
In cultivation, the species adapts to a range of soils in a sunny or partially shaded situation with good drainage. It can be cultivated outdoors in USDA hardiness zones 8B-11, but does not tolerate freezing temperatures. In colder regions it may be cultivated as an annual. Plants may be propagated by cuttings, layering or division. They seed freely, and new seedlings that appear are easily transplanted.

This plant has gained the Royal Horticultural Society's Award of Garden Merit (confirmed 2020).

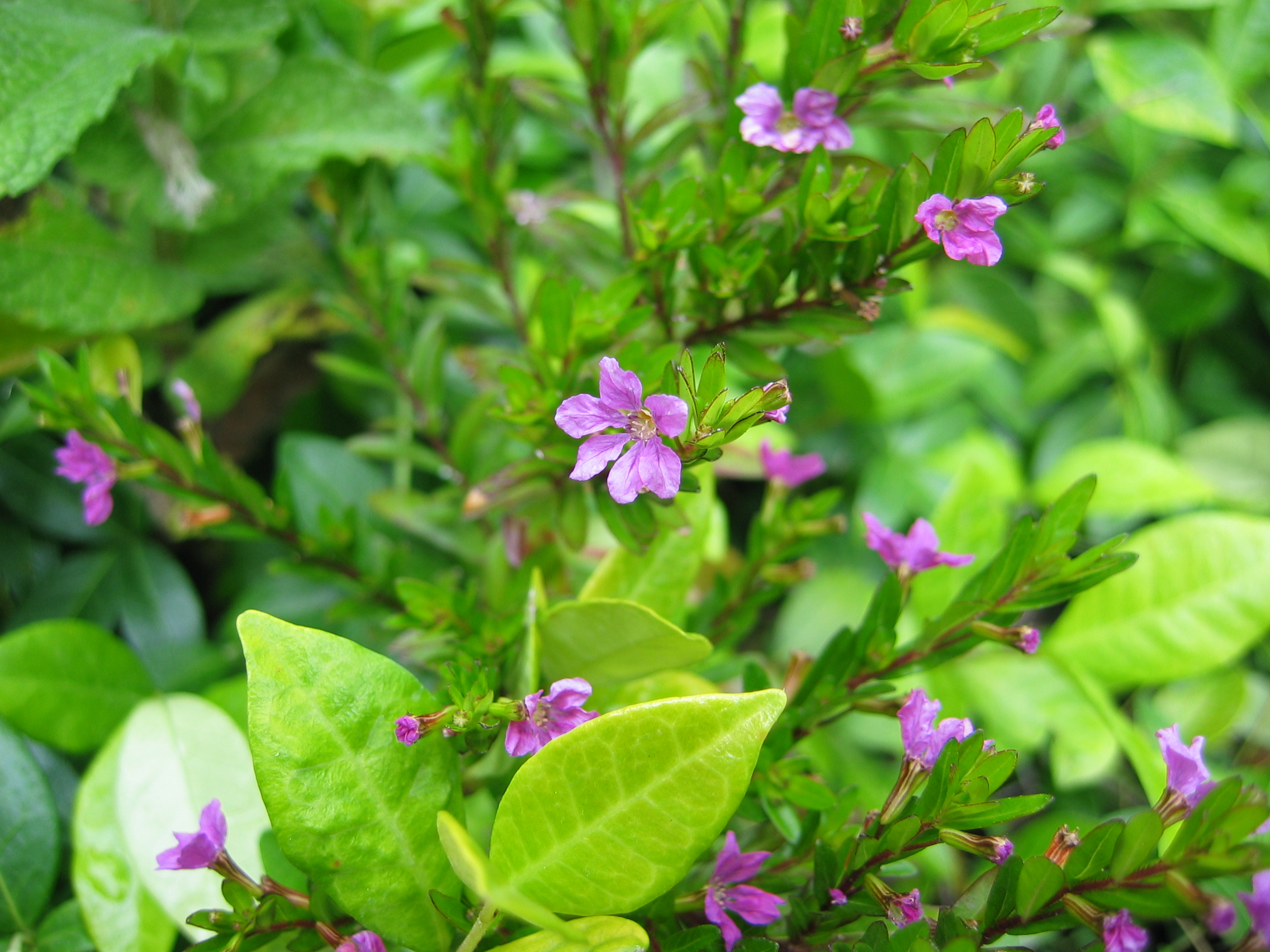

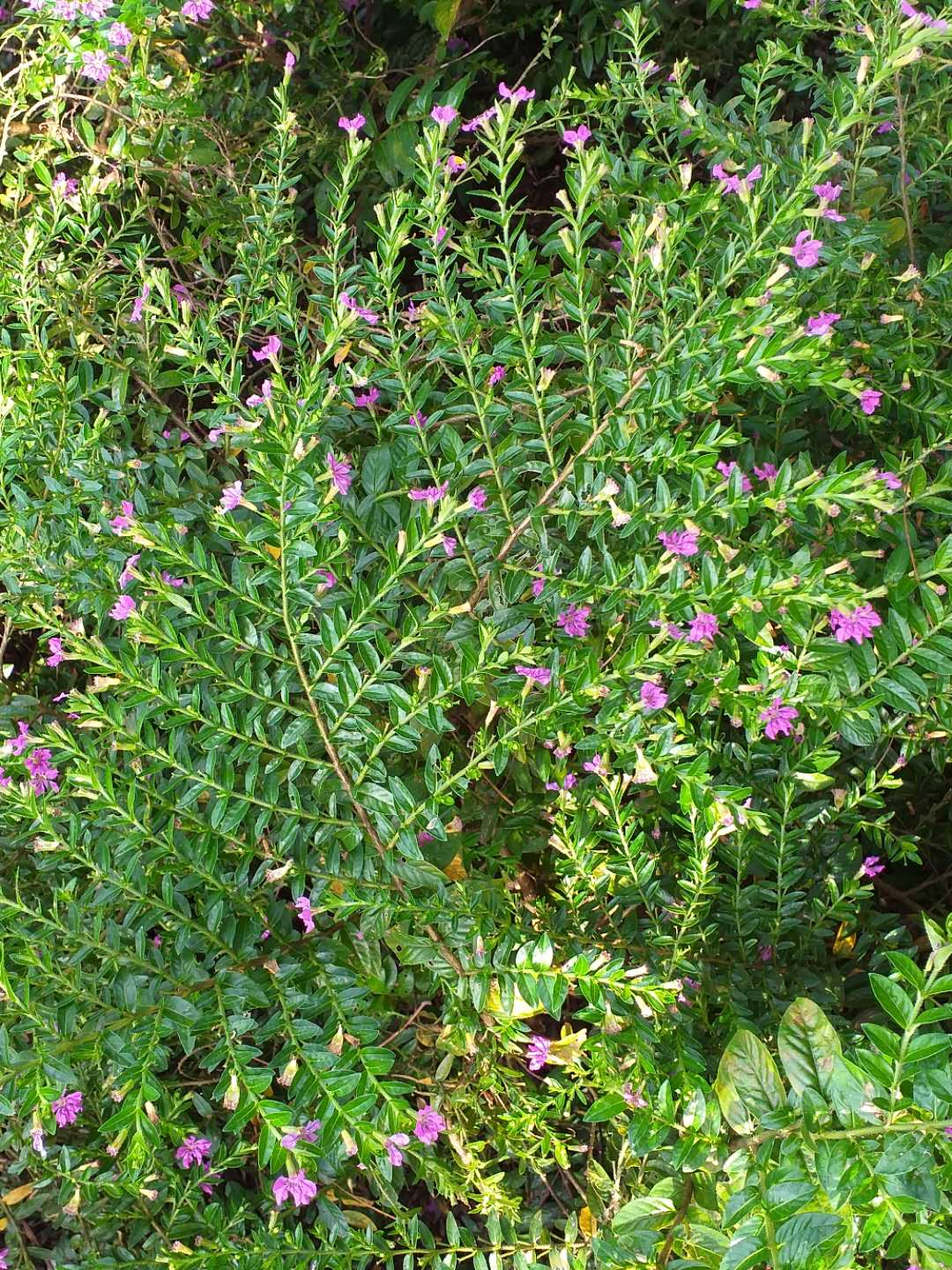
