= Cuphea elegans =

Scientific classification
- Kingdom: Plantae
- Clade: Tracheophytes
- Clade: Angiosperms
- Clade: Eudicots
- Clade: Rosids
- Order: Myrtales
- Family: Lythraceae
- Genus: Cuphea
- Species: C. elegans

Binomial name
- Cuphea elegans Klotzsch ex Koehne, 1877

Synonyms
- Cuphea × elegans Regel, 1851

Species of flowering plant

Cuphea elegans is a species of flowering plants native to Brazil.

The species is recognized by Tropicos whereas The Plant List considers it a synonym of Cuphea melvilla Lindl.
