= Cuphea aspera =

Conservation status
- Imperiled (NatureServe)

Scientific classification
- Kingdom: Plantae
- Clade: Tracheophytes
- Clade: Angiosperms
- Clade: Eudicots
- Clade: Rosids
- Order: Myrtales
- Family: Lythraceae
- Genus: Cuphea
- Species: C. aspera

Binomial name
- Cuphea aspera Chapm.

Species of flowering plant

Cuphea aspera is a species of flowering plant in the loosestrife family known by the common names tropical waxweed, Chapman's waxweed, and Apalachicola waxweed. It is endemic to Florida in the United States, where it is limited to Gulf and Franklin Counties on the central Florida Panhandle. It has likely been extirpated from Calhoun County.

This perennial herb grows up to about 40 centimeters tall from a woody, branching rootstock. The stems are coated in white hairs and purplish glandular hairs. The oppositely arranged or whorled leaves are each up to 2.5 centimeters long. The opposite or whorled flowers have lavender or pink petals and reddish sepals. Blooming occurs in June and July. This plant is somewhat similar to the nonnative Colombian waxweed, which has alternately arranged flowers.

This plant grows in moist and wet habitat, such as wet prairies and seeps. It also occurs on roadsides. It prefers open habitat, such as fire-maintained openings in forest.

There are about twenty populations, most of which are located on private property owned by timber companies. The habitat has been converted to silviculture of slash pine. Threats include fire suppression, which eliminates the normal fire regime and allows closure of the canopy, shading out the plants. The species is not tolerant of shade. Besides fire suppression and conversion of the habitat, threats include herbicide use and mechanical disturbance such as mowing.
