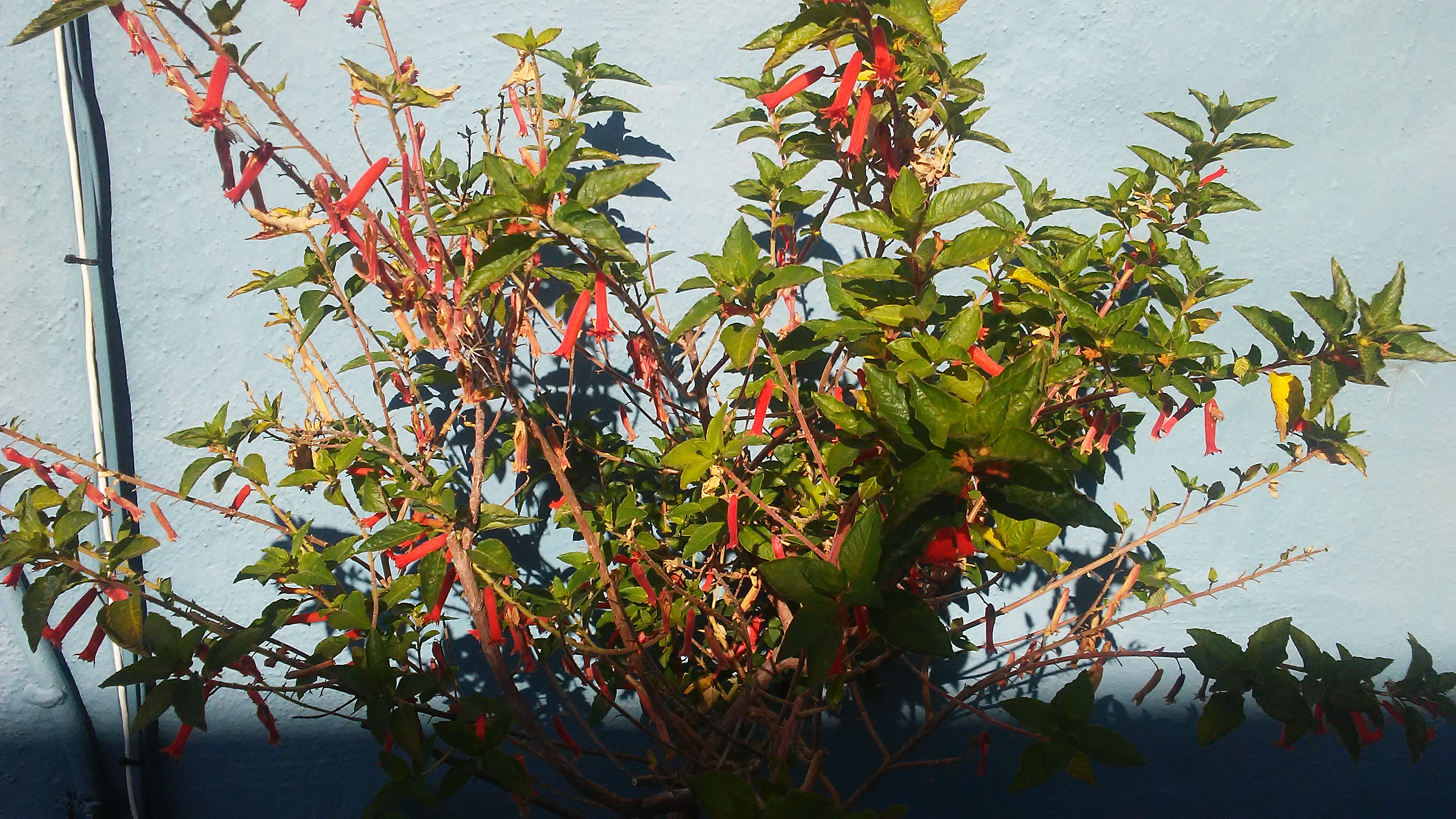
- A Cuphea oreophila bush

Scientific classification
- Kingdom: Plantae
- Clade: Tracheophytes
- Clade: Angiosperms
- Clade: Eudicots
- Clade: Rosids
- Order: Myrtales
- Family: Lythraceae
- Genus: Cuphea
- Species: C. oreophila

Binomial name
- Cuphea oreophila Brandegee ex Bacig.

= Cuphea oreophila =

Species of flowering plant

Cuphea oreophila also known as the sacred flower of the Andes is a Lythraceae perennial plant that grows into a small bush. Native to Guatemala and the Mexican state of Chiapas, it was first described by TS Brandegee and Rimo Bacigalupi in 1933.

== Description ==
Cuphea oreophila has strongly veined lime-green leaves 50–75 millimetres (2–3 in) long and 25–40 mm (1–1 1/2 in) wide and narrow bright red trumpet-shaped flowers 40 or 50 mm (1 1/2 or 2 in) long. It grows to a maximum height of 3 m (10 ft) in the wild but usually 1.2 m (4 ft) tall and wide in cultivation. It has unusually large leaflike appendages.

The species is native to montane forests in Chiapas near its border with Oaxaca, at elevations of between 1,400 and 1,700 m (4,500 and 5,500 ft), and in 1982 was also collected in Guatemala.
