= Cuphea oil =

Cuphea oil is oil pressed from the seeds of several species of the genus Cuphea. Interest in cuphea oils is relatively recent, as a source of medium-chain triglycerides like those found in coconut oil and palm oil. Cuphea oil is of interest because it grows in climates where palms - the source of both of these oils - do not grow.

The fatty acid content of cuphea oils are as follows. The composition of coconut oil is included for comparison:

Species	Caprylic	Capric	Lauric	Myristic	Other
C. painteri	73.0%	20.4%	0.2%	0.3%	6.1%
C. hookeriana	65.1%	23.7%	0.1%	0.2%	10.9%
C. koehneana	0.2%	95.3%	1.0%	0.3%	3.2%
C. lanceolata		87.5%	2.1%	1.4%	9.0%
C. viscosissima	9.1%	75.5%	3.0%	1.3%	11.1%
C. carthagenensis		5.3%	81.4%	4.7%	8.6%
C. laminuligera		17.1%	62.6%	9.5%	10.8%
C. wrightii		29.4%	53.9%	5.1%	11.6%
C. lutea	0.4%	29.4%	37.7%	11.1%	21.4%
C. epilobiifolia		0.3%	19.6%	67.9%	12.2%
C. stigulosa	0.9%	18.3%	13.8%	45.2%	21.8%
Coconut	8.0%	7.0%	48.0%	18.0%	19.0%

These oils are also valuable as sources of single fatty acids. C. painteri, for example, is rich in caprylic acid (73%), where C. carthagenensis oil consists of 81% lauric acid. C. koehneana oil may be the richest natural source of a single fatty acid, with 95% of its content consisting of capric acid.
