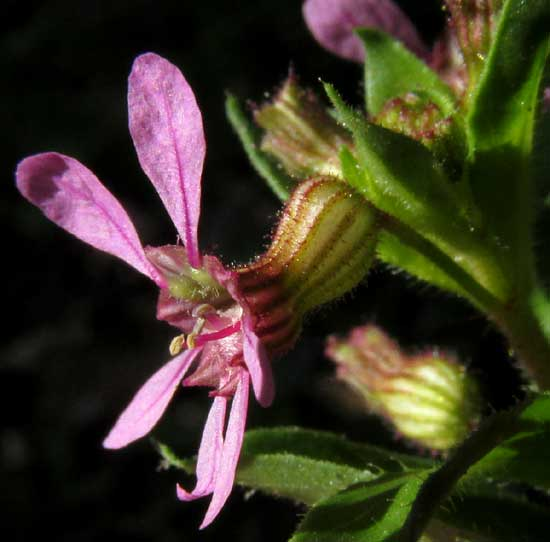
- Cuphea gaumeri flower

Scientific classification
- Kingdom: Plantae
- Clade: Tracheophytes
- Clade: Angiosperms
- Clade: Eudicots
- Clade: Rosids
- Order: Myrtales
- Family: Lythraceae
- Genus: Cuphea
- Species: C. gaumeri

Binomial name
- Cuphea gaumeri Koehne

Synonyms
- Parsonsia gaumeri (Koehne) Standl.

= Cuphea gaumeri =

Species of plant

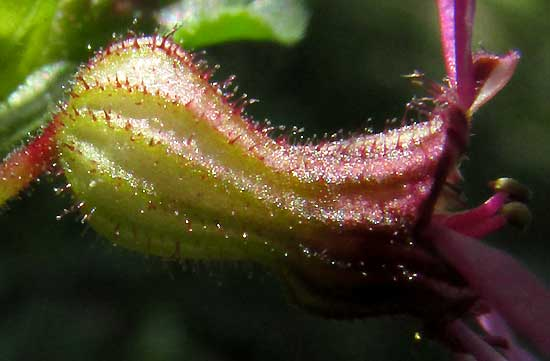
Cuphea gaumeri curved hypanthium with trichomes bearing glands

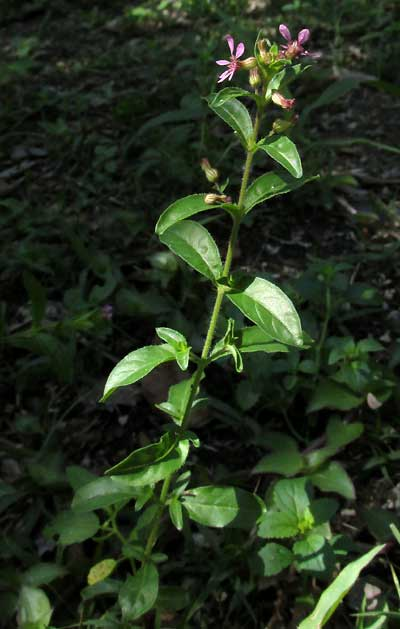
Cuphea gaumeri in shaded forest habitat

Cuphea gaumeri, with no English name, is a rare species of annual, herbaceous plant endemic just to southern Mexico's Yucatan Peninsula. It belongs to the family Lythraceae.

== Description ==
Cuphea gaumeri is recognized by the following features:

- Stems are sparsely to abundantly branched near the base and grow up to 50 cm (20 in) tall.
- Leaves are narrower than long, those at the base up to 18 mm (0.7 in) long; they gradually become smaller above.
- Flowers gathered at stem tips or along the stem bear 6 purplish petals which arise between 6 small sepals at the tip of a conspicuously curved, 12-ribbed hypanthium with a conspicuous bulge on one side at the base; the hypanthium bears hair-like trichomes tipped with glands. There are 11 stamens, some longer than others.

== Distribution ==
Cuphea gaumeri is endemic to Mexico's Yucatan Peninsula. A listing for the outlying state of Chiapas may be questionable.

== Habitat ==
Cuphea gaumeri occurs mainly in Yucatán dry forests, thorny deciduous forests, and seasonally flooded low spots. These habitats are characterized by rocky, impermeable soils vulnerable to partial flooding during the rainy season. The species grows in shaded environments under the canopy of shrubs or small trees.

== Conservation status ==
Cuphea gaumeri, although in 2026 unlisted by the International Union for Conservation of Nature, is of such limited geographic range that it can be classified as a "rare" species.

In the areas where Cuphea gaumeri exists, local farmers introduce livestock which graze on various herbaceous species, including C. gaumeri and other endemic herbs and shrubs.

== Ecology ==
Cuphea gaumeri thrives in low light and high water conditions, showing enhanced germination, growth, and flower production.

Besides stigmas of Cuphea gaumeri flowers receiving pollen from other flowers of its own species, pollen also comes from Tamonea curassavia and Angelonia angustifolia. However, pollen from only one of the other pollen donors has a significant effect on C. gaumeri reproductive success. Moreover, the effect is dependent on water and light availability. These factors result in "...spatial and temporal mosaics in the ecological and evolutionary consequences of post-pollination interactions."

== Taxonomy ==
In 1900, Cuphea gaumeri was named and described as a new species by Bernhard Adalbert Emil Koehne. Earlier the type specimen upon which the species is based, Gaumer #785, had been distributed under the erroneous name Cuphea Trinitatis.

=== Phylogeny ===
Phylogenetic analysis using sequences of nuclear DNA from Cuphea gaumeri suggests that the species forms a clade with four narrowly endemic North American species, three species endemic to South America, and two widely distributed species in both continents. Among features delimiting this clade are that its hypanthium is almost actinomorphic and bears no spur.

=== Etymology ===
The genus name Cuphea is based on the Greek kyphos, meaning "humped", alluding to protruding base of the hypanthium.

The species name gaumeri is a New Latin construction honoring George Franklin Gaumer, who in the Yucatan Peninsula collected the type specimen upon which the species is based.
