= Fire-stick farming =

Aboriginal Australian practice of regular burning

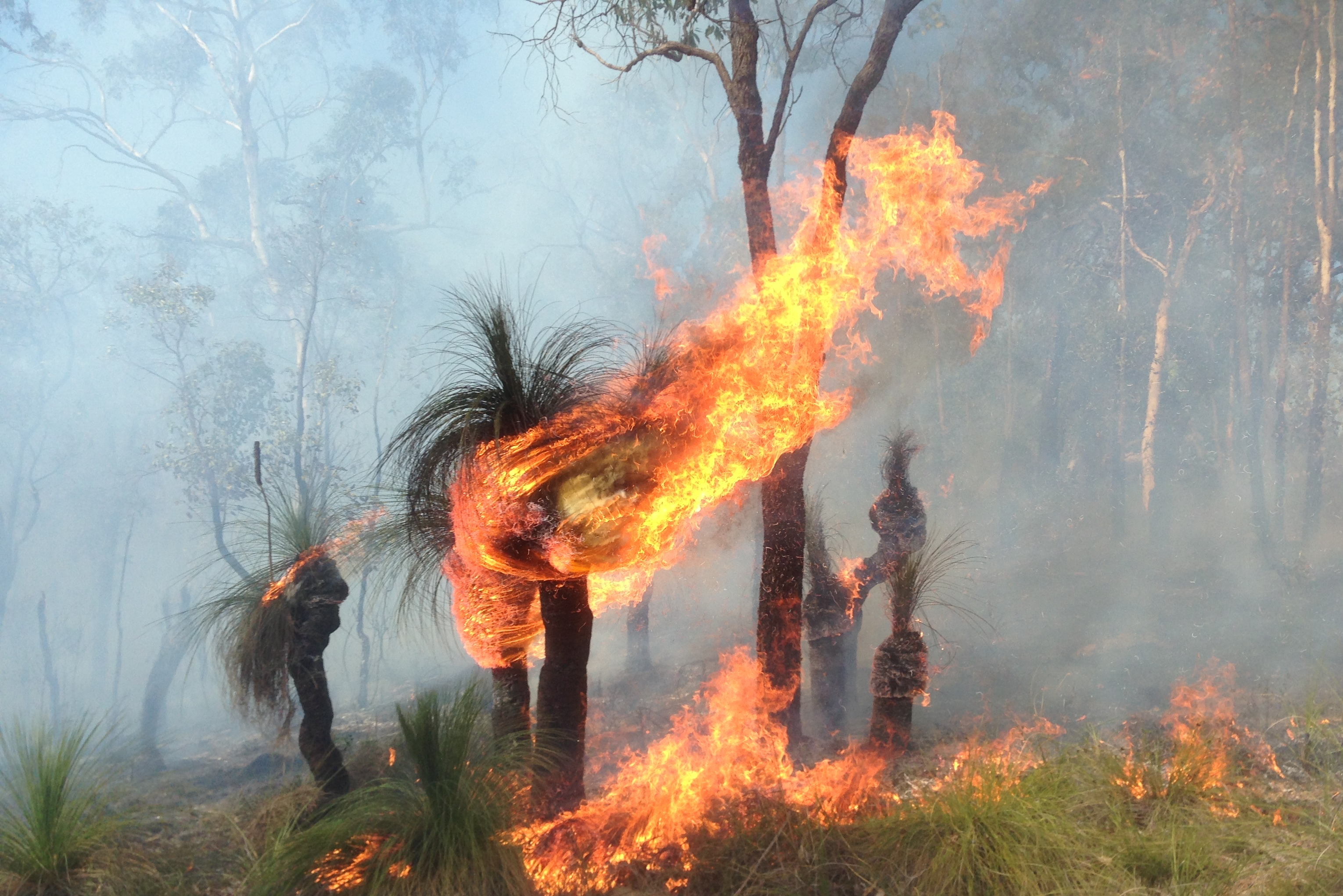
Grass tree on fire during controlled burn in Glen Forrest, Western Australia

Fire-stick farming, also known as cool burning, is a cultural burning practice whereby Aboriginal Australians regularly use fire to burn vegetation, a management technique which has been utilized for thousands of years. There are a number of purposes for doing this special type of controlled burning, including to facilitate hunting, to change the composition of plant and animal species in an area, weed control, hazard reduction, and increase of biodiversity.

While it had been discontinued in many parts of Australia, it has been reintroduced in the 21st century by the teachings of custodians from areas where the practice is extant in continuous unbroken tradition such as the Noongar people's cold fire.

== Terminology ==
The term "fire-stick farming" was coined by Australian archaeologist Rhys Jones in 1969. It has more recently been called cultural burning and cool burning.

Aboriginal peoples and language groups from around Australia also have their own words and terms or this practice, including, but not limited to gandyi ngurrawa in the Dharug language and djandak wi in the Djadjawurrung language.

== History ==
Aboriginal burning has been proposed as the cause of a variety of environmental changes, including the extinction of the Australian megafauna, a diverse range of large animals which populated Pleistocene Australia. Palynologist A. P. Kershaw has argued that Aboriginal burning may have modified the vegetation to the extent that the food resources of the megafauna were diminished, and as a consequence the largely herbivorous megafauna became extinct. Kershaw also suggested that the arrival of Aboriginal people may have occurred more than 100,000 years ago, and that their burning caused the sequences of vegetation changes which he detects through the late Pleistocene. The first to propose such an early arrival for Aboriginal peoples was Gurdip Singh from the Australian National University, who found evidence in his pollen cores from Lake George indicating that Aboriginal people began burning in the lake catchment around 120,000 years ago.

Tim Flannery believes that the megafauna were hunted to extinction by Aboriginal people soon after they arrived. He argues that with the rapid extinction of the megafauna, virtually all of which were herbivorous, a great deal of vegetation was left uneaten, increasing the standing crop of fuel. As a consequence, fires became larger and hotter than before, causing the reduction of fire-sensitive plants to the advantage of those that were fire-resistant or fire-dependent. Flannery suggests that Aboriginal people then began to burn more frequently to maintain a high species diversity and to reduce the effect of high intensity fires on medium-sized animals and perhaps some plants. He argues that twentieth-century Australian mammal extinctions are largely the result of the cessation of Aboriginal "firestick farming".

Researcher David Horton from the Australian Institute of Aboriginal and Torres Strait Islander Studies, suggested in 1982, "Aboriginal use of fire had little impact on the environment and... the patterns of distribution of plants and animals which obtained 200 years ago would have been essentially the same whether or not Aborigines had previously been living here".

A 2010 study of charcoal records from more than 220 sites in Australasia dating back 70,000 years found that the arrival of the first inhabitants about 50,000 years ago did not result in significantly greater fire activity across the continent (although this date is in question, with sources pointing to much earlier migrations). The study reported higher bushfire activity from about 70,000 to 28,000 years ago. It decreased until about 18,000 years ago, around the time of the last glacial maximum, and then increased again, a pattern consistent with shifts between warm and cool climatic conditions. This suggests that fire in Australasia predominantly reflects climate, with colder periods characterised by less and warmer intervals by more biomass burning.

Regular firing favoured not only fire-tolerant or fire-resistant plants, but also encouraged those animals which were favoured by more open country. On this basis, it is clear that Aboriginal burning, in many areas at least, did affect the "natural" ecosystem, producing a range of vegetation associations which would maximise productivity in terms of the food requirements of the Aboriginal people. Jones goes so far as to say that "through firing over thousands of years, Aboriginal man has managed to extend his natural habitat zone".

Most of these theories implicate Aboriginal use of fire as a component of the changes to both plant and animal communities within Australia during the last 50,000 years, although the significance of the effect of their burning is far from clear. Some have suggested that the intensive use of fire as a tool followed, but was not directly a consequence of, the extinction of the megafauna. If the megafauna remained in some areas until the Holocene, evidence is needed from within the last 10,000 years for changes induced by new Aboriginal burning patterns.

Another factor to be considered is the likelihood that Aboriginal population density increased rapidly and dramatically over the last 5,000 to 10,000 years.

The stone technology which Aboriginal people had been using with little modification for over 40,000 years diversified and specialised in the last 5,000 years. Spear barbs and tips peaked about 2,000 years ago, and then completely disappeared from the archaeological record in south-eastern Australia. They were replaced by technologies associated with the exploitation of smaller animals – shell fish hooks and bone points along the coast for fishing, axes for hunting possums across the woodlands, and adzes for sharpening digging sticks along the banks of the larger rivers where the yams were abundant. The intensive and regular use of fire was an essential component of this late Holocene shift in resource base.

Cultural burnings were slowly eradicated after European settlers began to colonise Australia from 1788 onwards. Studying the layers of pollen and other organic matter from samples of sedimentary layers of earth from and around the Bolin Bolin billabong in Victoria in 2021 revealed that colonisation brought about the biggest changes in around 10,000 years. The samples show a lack of plant biodiversity since then, with huge forests of highly combustible species of eucalypt replacing plants which were less flammable and burn at lower temperatures. An early result of the disruption of cool burning was the devastating Black Thursday bushfires in February 1851, which burnt 50,000 square kilometres (19,000 sq mi) of the colony of Victoria.

== Purposes ==
There are a number of purposes, including to facilitate hunting, to change the composition of plant and animal species in an area, weed control, hazard reduction, and increase of biodiversity. Fire-stick farming had the long-term effect of turning dry forest into savanna, increasing the populations of grass-eating animals such as kangaroos.

== Current use ==
While it has been discontinued in many parts of Australia, it has been reintroduced to some Aboriginal groups by the teachings of custodians from areas where the practice is extant in continuous unbroken tradition, such as the Noongar people's cold fire.

Cultural burnings were reintroduced in parts of Australia during the early twenty-first century, and some Australian states now integrate them with other fire-prevention strategies. State investment in Indigenous fire planning strategies has been most widespread in northern Australia. In 2019 the Darwin Centre for Bushfire Research at Charles Darwin University released data suggesting that the reintroduction of traditional burning on a large scale had significantly reduced the area of land destroyed by wildfires.

=== 2019–2020 bushfires ===
The 2019–2020 Australian bushfire season led to increasing calls by some experts for the greater use of fire-stick farming. Traditional practitioners had already worked with some fire agencies to conduct burns on a small scale, with the uptake of workshops held by the Firesticks Alliance Indigenous Corporation increasing each year. Farmers and other landowners were interested in learning how traditional fire practices could help them to preserve their properties. Former Emergency Management Commissioner for the state of Victoria, Craig Lapsley, called on the Federal Government to fund and implement a national Indigenous burning program. Firesticks Alliance spokesperson Oliver Costello said that a cultural burn could help to prevent wildfires, rejuvenate local flora and protect native animal habitat.

In the final report of the 2020 Royal Commission into National Natural Disaster Arrangements, the Commission found that "The weight of research into the effects of fuel reduction on the propagation of extreme bushfires indicates that as conditions deteriorate, fuel reduction is of diminishing effectiveness". It distinguished between ordinary and extreme bushfires, saying that fuel reduction could be used to reduce risk: "Reducing available fuels in the landscape can also slow the initial rate of fire spread and fire intensity, which can provide opportunities for fire suppression and thereby reduce the risk of fires escalating into extreme fire events."

=== 2021 Adelaide park lands cultural burn ===
On 14 May 2021, a scheduled cultural burn took place in the Adelaide park lands by representatives of the Kaurna people, in a highly symbolic moment after years of preparation to restore the ancient practice. The project, called Kaurna Kardla Parranthi, was undertaken with the support of the City of Adelaide. The burn was part of the ecological management plan for a key area of biodiversity in Carriageway Park / Tuthangga (Park 17).

== Examples ==
A series of aerial photographs taken around 1947 reveal that the Karajarri people practised fire-stick farming in the Great Sandy Desert of Western Australia for thousands of years, until they left the desert in the 1950s and 1960s. When fires swept the desert in the decades following their departure, they caused widespread destruction, "losing 36 to 50 per cent of 24,000 square kilometres (9,300 sq mi) of desert to just a couple of fires every year". Since the establishment of native title over the area and the proclamation as an Indigenous Protected Area in 2014, Karajarri rangers have reintroduced the practice of burning. Traditional owners and scientists are studying the flora and fauna in the area to see how the fires affect individual species. While some species prefer more recently burnt vegetation, others favour areas burnt longer ago, so it is important to have a diversity of different fire ages, to encourage biodiversity.

== See also ==
- Native American use of fire in ecosystems
- Biochar
- Fire regime
- Shifting cultivation
- Slash-and-burn
- Slash-and-char
- Terra preta
