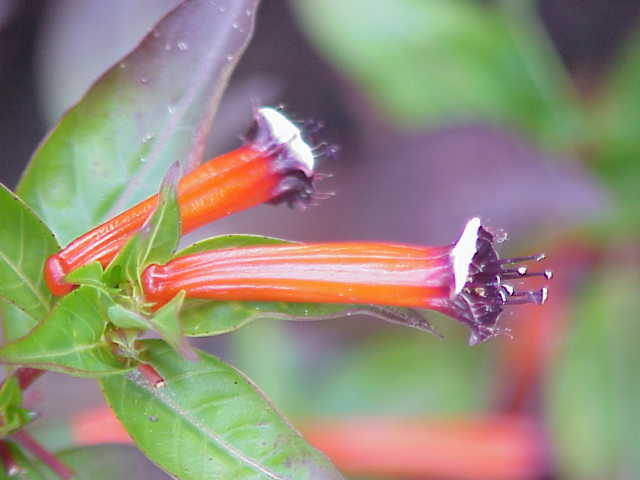

Conservation status
- Secure (NatureServe)

Scientific classification
- Kingdom: Plantae
- Clade: Tracheophytes
- Clade: Angiosperms
- Clade: Eudicots
- Clade: Rosids
- Order: Myrtales
- Family: Lythraceae
- Genus: Cuphea
- Species: C. ignea

Binomial name
- Cuphea ignea A.DC.

= Cuphea ignea =

Species of flowering plant

Cuphea ignea, the cigar plant, cigar flower, firecracker plant, or Mexican cigar, sometimes referred to as cigarette plant or cigarette bush is a species of flowering plant in the genus Cuphea of the family Lythraceae. It is a tropical, densely branched evergreen subshrub. This species, native to Mexico and the West Indies, produces small, tubular, bright red to orange flowers. Each flower is tipped with a thin white rim and two small purple-black petals. The flowers, which are attractive to hummingbirds and butterflies, resemble lit cigars, hence the name ignea, which is Latin for "fiery". The genus name Cuphea comes from the Greek word kyphos which means curved or humped; this is thought to refer to the shape of the seeds. The leaves are small, elliptical and of a bright green colour. It grows to about 60 cm (24 in).

== Cultivation ==
In temperate climates Cuphea ignea requires a warm, sheltered spot, as it does not tolerate frost. Alternately it may be grown under glass or indoors as a houseplant. In the UK this plant has gained the Royal Horticultural Society's Award of Garden Merit (confirmed 2017).

In the US, Cuphea ignea is winter hardy to USDA zones 10–12. It is somewhat drought tolerant, but prefers well-watered, well-drained soils.

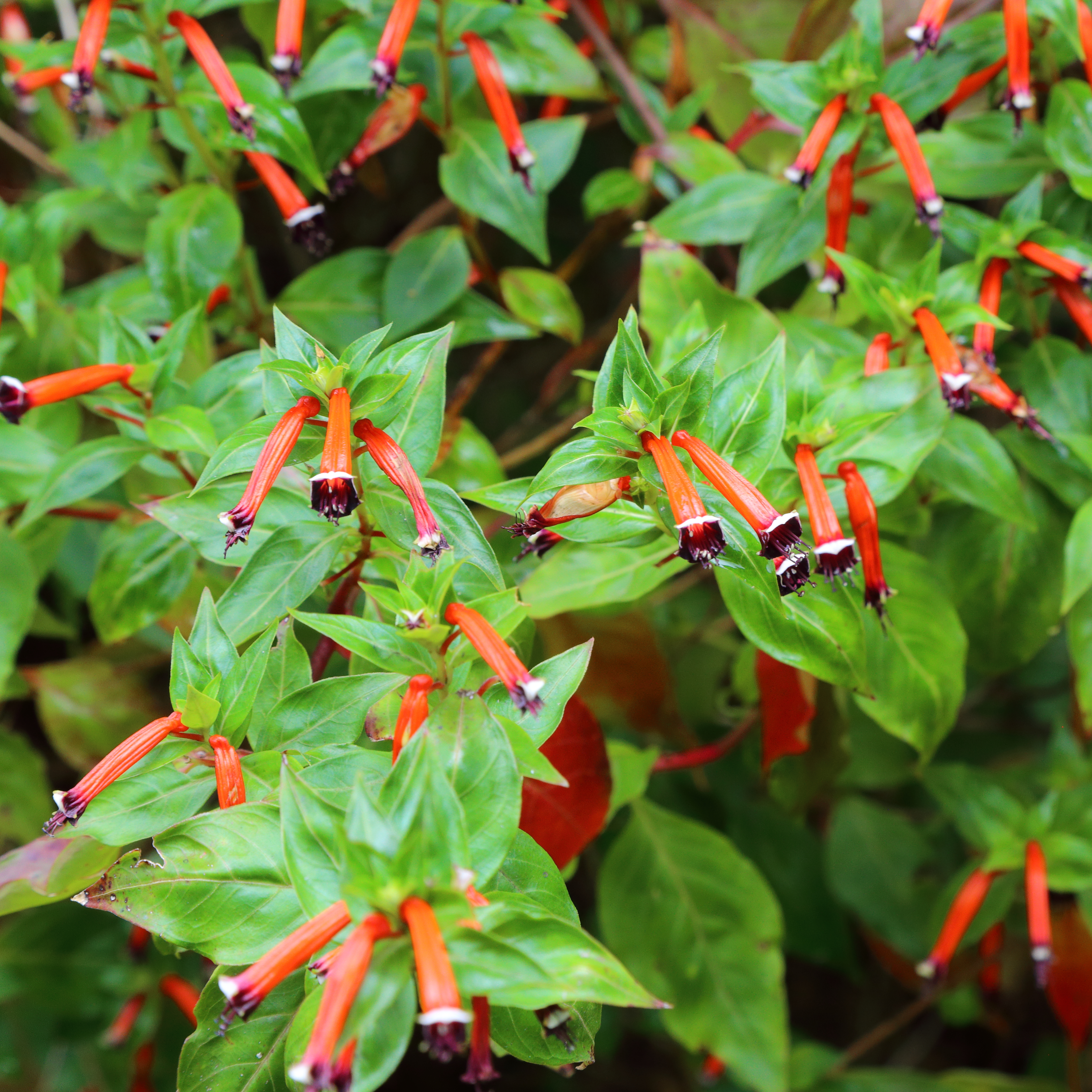

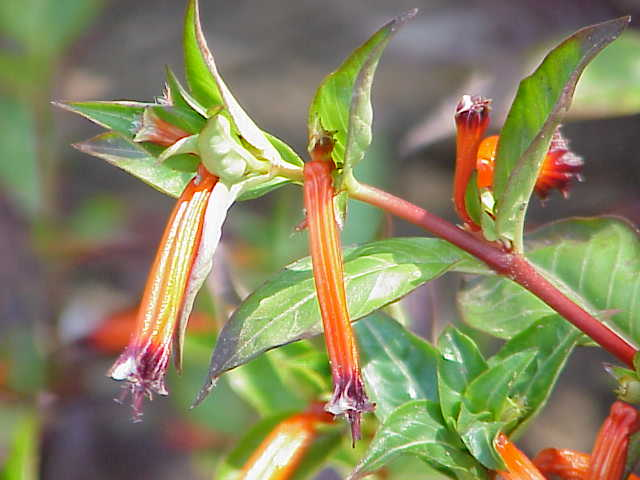

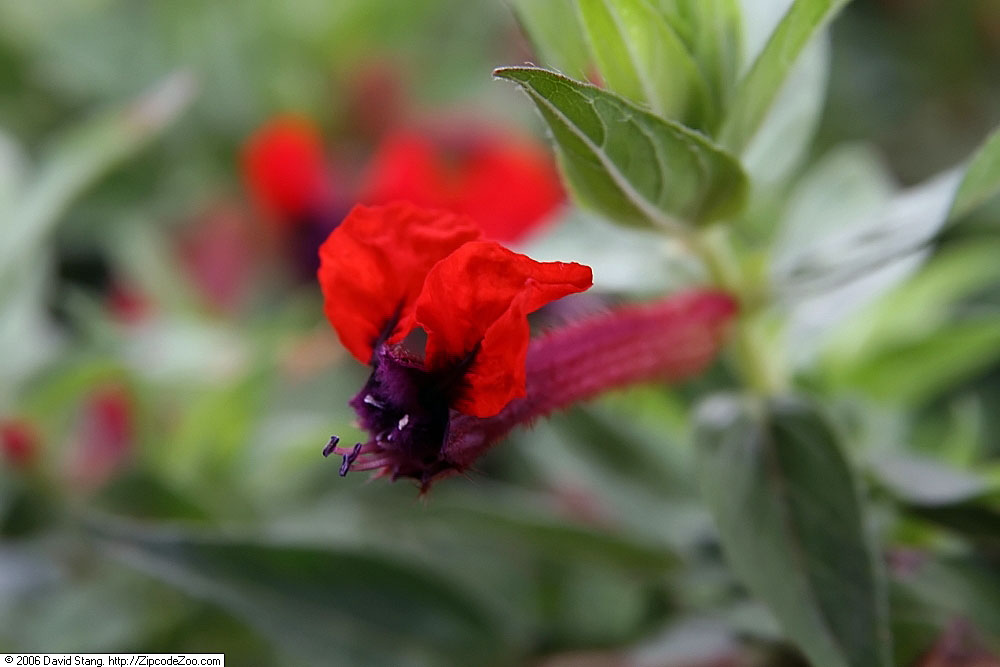
