= Tarweed =

Tarweed or tarplant is a common name for several plants and may refer to:

- Various plants in the tribe Madieae of the family Asteraceae:
  - Anisocarpus madioides
  - Blepharizonia
  - Centromadia
  - Deinandra
  - Harmonia
  - Hemizonella
  - Hemizonia
  - Holocarpha
  - Jensia
  - Madia
- Amsinckia lycopsoides
- Cuphea viscosissima
