= Cultural burning =

Worldwide cultural practice of using fire to manage landscapes

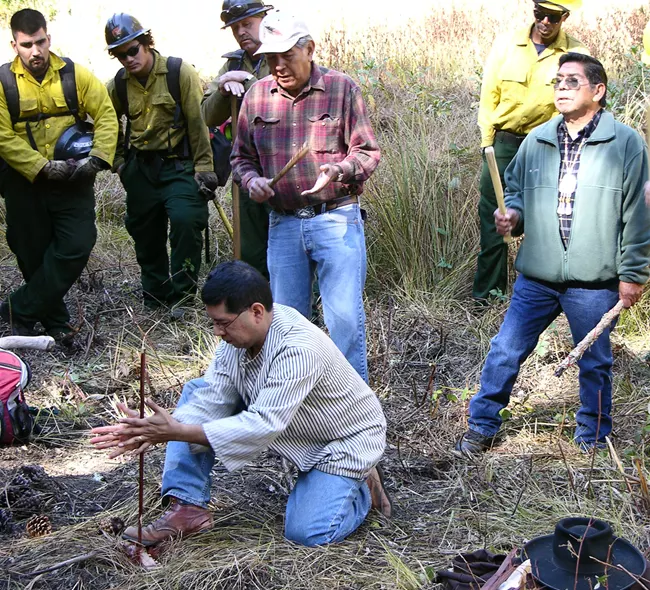
Members of Yosemite Fire look on as members of the Southern Sierra Miwuk Nation engage in a ceremony and traditional methods to ignite a prescribed fire

Cultural burning is the process of using prescribed burns by Indigenous peoples to manage their environments. In some cases, the practice has resulted in local flora becoming dependent on patterned burnings. The practice is an example of humans as a keystone species of their respective environments, which has been given as an example of an Indigenous method of ecological management.

Specifically, the Native American use of fire in ecosystems has been well documented, as well as the utilization of fire-stick farming by the Indigenous peoples of Australia. Besides the ecological function, there is a strong cultural aspect. Species most adapted to the burns are also ones most used by the Indigenous peoples, such as California black oak. Lands historically occupied by Indigenous peoples have become attuned to this process of low frequent burns, but not all environments are adjusted to this management. Cultural burns need to occur regularly and can be adapted to different microclimates in order to improve the efficacy of the practice.

== Cultural significance ==
Indigenous communities use cultural burning as part of their land management practices, but it is also a fundamental part of their identity and customs. Sacred locations and ecosystems that are essential to Indigenous food supplies are protected by cultural burning in the Pacific West region of the United States. Based on traditional ecological knowledge, this approach to fire control highlights the interconnectedness of fire, people, and the environment. Cultural burning exemplifies how Indigenous land stewardship supports ecosystems and cultural practices. It demonstrates that fire is a means of caring for the land, ensuring long-term survival and spiritual connection, rather than only being a preventative measure.

Indigenous civilizations have developed methods for using fire to protect biodiversity and promote the growth of essential plants in rainforests, where burning is challenging due to high humidity. These burns change the environment in ways that reduce the risk of destructive wildfires while encouraging the growth of fruits and medicinal plants. This strategy demonstrates significant ecological expertise because it preserves plant diversity, promotes new development, and even helps mitigate more intense wildfires by clearing the forest floor of accumulated fuel.

In today's society, many people view fire as dangerous, while many Indigenous people view fire as an element that gives life. Cultural burning upholds a respectful relationship with the environment and has ceremonial and spiritual importance. This ideology differs from Western views, which regard fire as primarily hazardous. Instead, cultural burning acknowledges the healing and environmental benefits of fire.

== Studies and practical uses ==
Cultural burning is a global practice, and similar techniques are used in Australia, Canada, Brazil, and Africa. These fires have been used to control wildlife populations, maintain places of worship, and restore environments. Although these practices are ecological instruments, they represent generations-old knowledge systems. This illustrates the importance of including Indigenous ideas in contemporary environmental management. Cultural burning is a worldwide activity with ecological and cultural significance, as demonstrated by specific examples like the Aboriginal fire management of Kakadu National Park in Australia or the Yurok's prescribed burns in California. These time-tested methods can inspire modern, more environmentally friendly approaches to maintaining grasslands and woodlands.

Some Indigenous agricultural practices, such as jhum in South Asia, or ancient Mayan techniques in Mesoamerica, are categorized as slash-and-burn agriculture. The approach can be considered sustainable at a small scale, but is considered environmentally detrimental in the modern age.

=== Australia ===
A study was done in Western Australia that looked into different fire management strategies and how they influence an endangered plant species known as the Backwater grevillea. They compared the different effects of current fire suppression strategies, cultural burning and wildfires on this species. From their results, they concluded the cultural burning was the best management style for the conservation of this species. Besides simply benefitting one species, they also noticed it had a greater effect in slowing the spread and occurrence of wildfires in the area, benefitting other plant species and people as well. Incorporating cultural burning was also found to have a secondary benefit to the local communities. Returning the Indigenous peoples' connection to the land created an opportunity for knowledge and kinship of local plants to be restored. This was due to the close studying done on the plants to find out what intensity of fire best suited their growth patterns. As a result of the study, it was determined that current fire management strategies are too generalized and do not take into account on site ecosystem relations and services. When the people working on the site have a learned connection to it they know how the ecosystem will respond to the fire and can better control its trajectory.

More recently, fire regime suppression was questioned in the aftermath of the 2022 wildfires in Australia. This method of management resulted in a build up in fuel on the forest floor that could not be cleared manually, as well as an increase of tree cover and density. Mariani et al. (2022) studied traces of pollen in Australia soils during the precolonial and modern eras, concluding that the landscape in the precolonial era was composed of 51% herbs and grasses, 15% tree cover, and 34% shrub cover. This is in stark contrast to modern times, where they found the landscape to be composed of 35% herbs and grasses, 48% tree cover, and 17% shrub cover. Allowing tree cover to expand in western Australia has resulted in greater intensity and frequency of wildfire. The reason for the expansion of these forests is credited to the suppression of cultural burns conducted by the indigenous population of Australia.

=== Brazil ===
In the Amazon, Indigenous groups employ controlled burns to enhance soil fertility and biodiversity.

In Brazil, fire has been a landscape management tool for approximately 12,000 years in the Atlantic Forest. The use of low-intensity controlled fires changed the structure and composition of the rainforest, which would not have a regular fire regime without human intervention. The reduction of aboveground biomass and a more open canopy allowed for the selection and cultivation of useful, edible species of plants.

=== Canada ===
First Nations in Canada use fire to maintain berry patches and caribou habitats. In the Anishinaabeg Nation around the Great Lakes, fire is a living being that has the power to change landscapes through both destruction and the regrowth and return of life following a fire. Human beings are also inexorably tied to the land they live on as stewards who maintain the ecosystems around them. Because fire can reveal dormant seedlings, it is a land management tool. Fire was a part of the landscapes of Ontario until early colonial rule restricted indigenous culture in across Canada.

Wildfires are an integral ecological process in Canada. They play a key role in stabilizing the region's various vegetation communities from grasslands and prairies to conifer and deciduous forests. The cause historic, large scale wildfires has been disputed. Some Canadian forest fire researchers have declared lightning strikes the most probable cause, believing the Indigenous population unlikely to create large scale fires. However, there is evidence showing the Indigenous population used fires to change their ecosystem and decrease fuel load to lessen the severity of natural wildfires.

=== United States ===
==== California ====
In California, fire was an integral part to how the Indigenous population managed the land. It has been shown that areas managed using Indigenous practices had created forests that were open and had a mixed stand of tree species. With lower fuel levels, the understory could host a diverse number of plant species. This in turn increased the forests' resistance to drought and fire, with the smoke from the small regular fires even decreasing pests and pathogen levels in the forests leading to a healthier tree stand. Without fire, California forests are now experiencing an over-densification of conifer trees which crowd out understory species and hinder the success rate of black oak saplings. Due to the lack of diversity, these forest are then more susceptible to drought and can create huge forest fires as the fuel builds up.

Today, some groups are working to bring back cultural burns to California's forests in order to create healthier forests and reduce wildfires. The North Fork Mono Tribe and Sierra National Forest have been implementing a 3 stage process designed with other local tribes since 2015. The first stage was to remove as many invasive species, small conifers, and fuel sources from a site before conducting an initial burn to reduce the fuel level even further. In the second stage, they would then try and remove as many large conifers as possible, focusing around the black oaks followed by another burn. In the final stage, they would prune and trim the black oaks to encourage a tree shape that would have existed prior to the conifers' take over. This would be followed by another low intensity burn. The tribe then planned to keep up management practices with routine burns and smoking the trees regularly to deter pests. The Plumas National Forest has been working with the Greenville Rancheria to incorporate prescribed burns for the purpose of maintaining an open understory and conserving black oak forests. They hope to use the site for gathering acorns, cultural activities and the development of cultural items using saplings. These restoration efforts are extremely important as they not only improve the environments' resilience to climate change but also grant more opportunities to tribes and low income communities as they now have more ecological services and cultural benefits.

Many Indigenous populations still depend on gathering and foraging to engage in their cultural practices and to live a life of self subsistence. As many tribes in California have been forced to live on small reservations, having productive forests nearby is necessary to keep their traditions and way of life alive. However due to the lack of fire and the over-densification of forests finding the plants needed to make medicines or cultural materials can be difficult or impossible to find. Suppressing the ability of these tribes to carry out cultural burns eventually leads to the forests providing fewer cultural ecosystem services. Eventually, these tribes will be unable to perform their cultural activities as they can no longer connect to the land in the same way their ancestors did. With black oaks being forced to compete with conifer trees, they grow taller and narrower than in the past. Ron Reed, a member of the Karuk Tribe from Northern California, has explained the importance of having access to these vital resources: "You can give me all the acorns in the world, you can get me all the fish in the world, you can get me everything for me to be an Indian, but it will not be the same unless I'm going out and processing, going out and harvesting, gathering myself. I think that really needs to be put out in mainstream society, that it's not just a matter of what you eat. It's about the intricate values that are involved in harvesting these resources, how we manage for these resources and when."

==== Pacific Northwest ====
Fire in the Pacific Northwest has been shown to help beargrass populations as well. Low severity fires have been proven to benefit the low elevation species of this grass by increasing the overall biomass in the region. While there was no effect on seedling establishment with the low severity method, high severity fires showed an increasing in seed germination and establishment. It was also found that for beargrass to grow long enough to produce basket making leaves, there must be one burn every 20 years. This is to keep down on shrub encroachment, while giving the time for the perennial grass to grow a deep root structure.

Native Americans of the Olympic Peninsula in Washington have been known to manage their ecosystems in favor of beneficial plants like the beargrass which is used for basket weaving. This method of management was a form of cultural burning that maintained the savannah and wetland prairie system of the peninsula's lowland environments. In 2008, it was found that after the suppression of these burns, the area has since been forested by Douglas firs with a decrease in the beargrass population.

== See also ==
- Biochar
- Controlled burn
