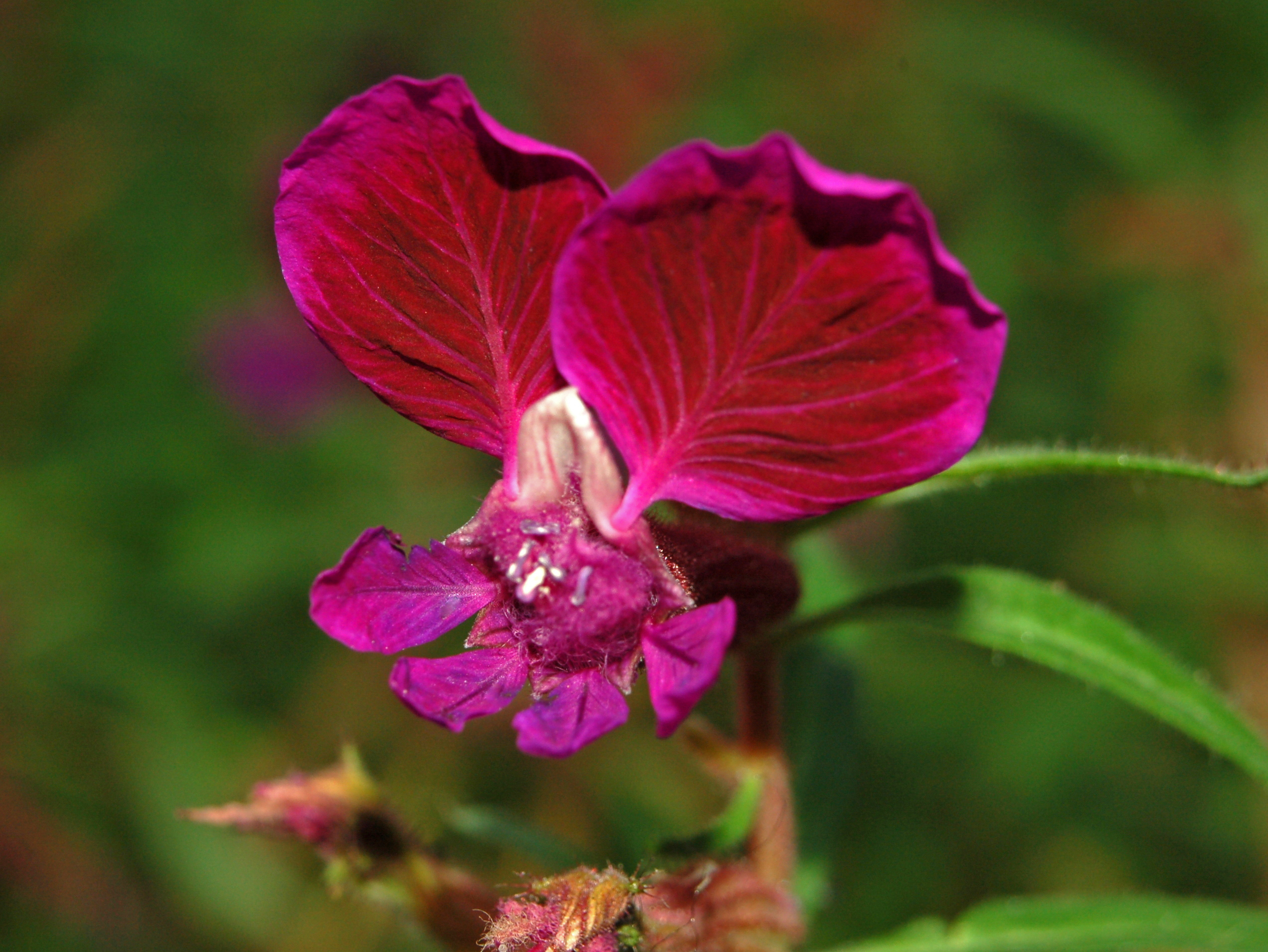
- Flower of Cuphea lanceolata

Scientific classification
- Kingdom: Plantae
- Clade: Tracheophytes
- Clade: Angiosperms
- Clade: Eudicots
- Clade: Rosids
- Order: Myrtales
- Family: Lythraceae
- Genus: Cuphea
- Species: C. lanceolata

Binomial name
- Cuphea lanceolata W.T.Aiton

= Cuphea lanceolata =

Species of flowering plant

Cuphea lanceolata, also known as the cigar flower, is an annual herbaceous flowering plant in the genus Cuphea of the family Lythraceae.

== Description ==
Cuphea lanceolata reaches on average a height of 45–60 centimetres (18–24 in). It has a branched stem with opposite, narrow, up to 7 cm long leaves. The flowers are tubular, dark-lilac or cherry-red, with six petals. The two upper petals are large and ear-shaped, while the others are quite small. The flowering period extends from June through August. The fruit is a capsule.

== Distribution ==
This species is native to north and central Mexico.

== Habitat ==
This tropical plant prefers hot, humid weather and rich, well drained soils in full sun.

== Gallery ==
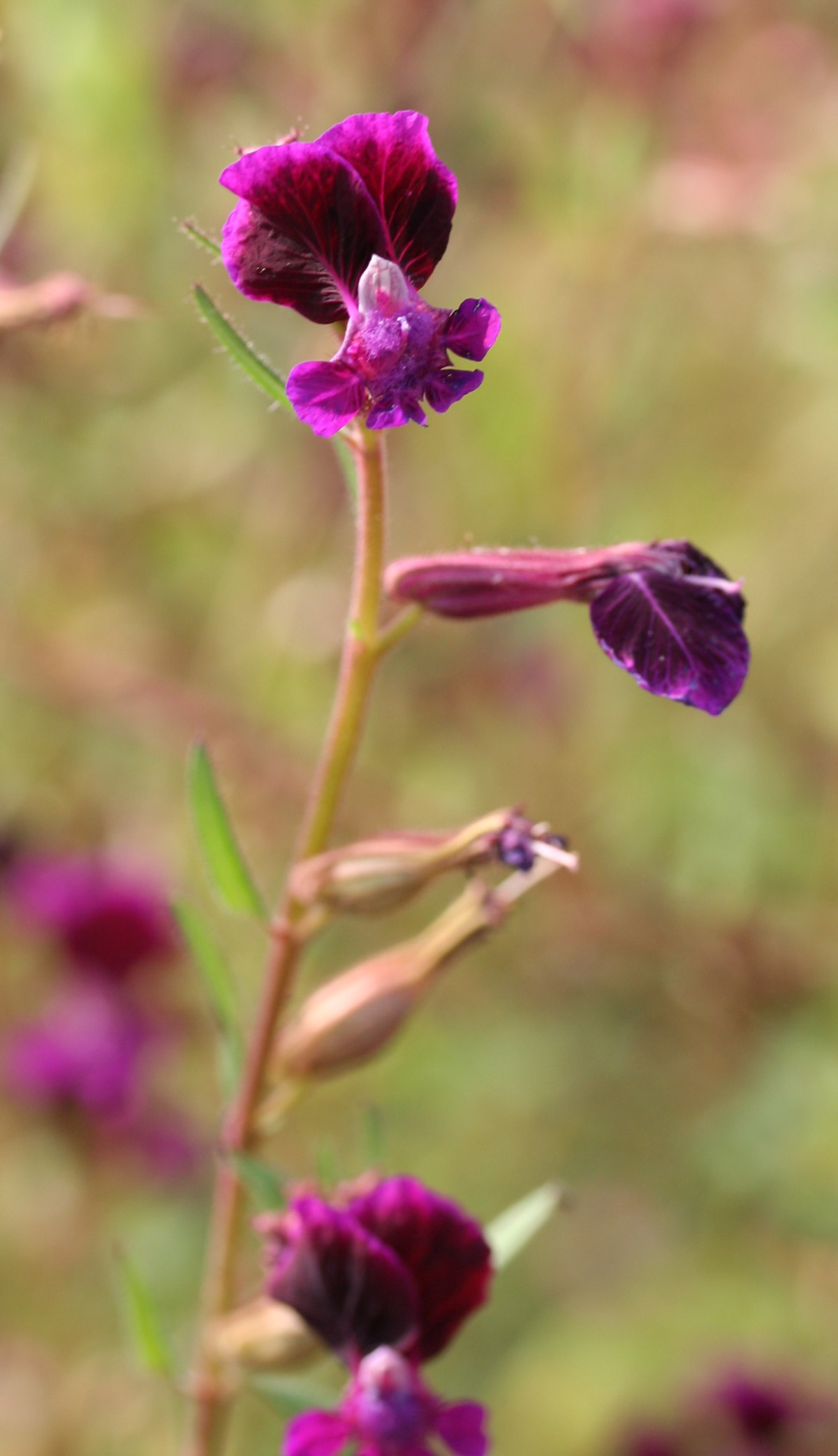
Plant of Cuphea lanceolata

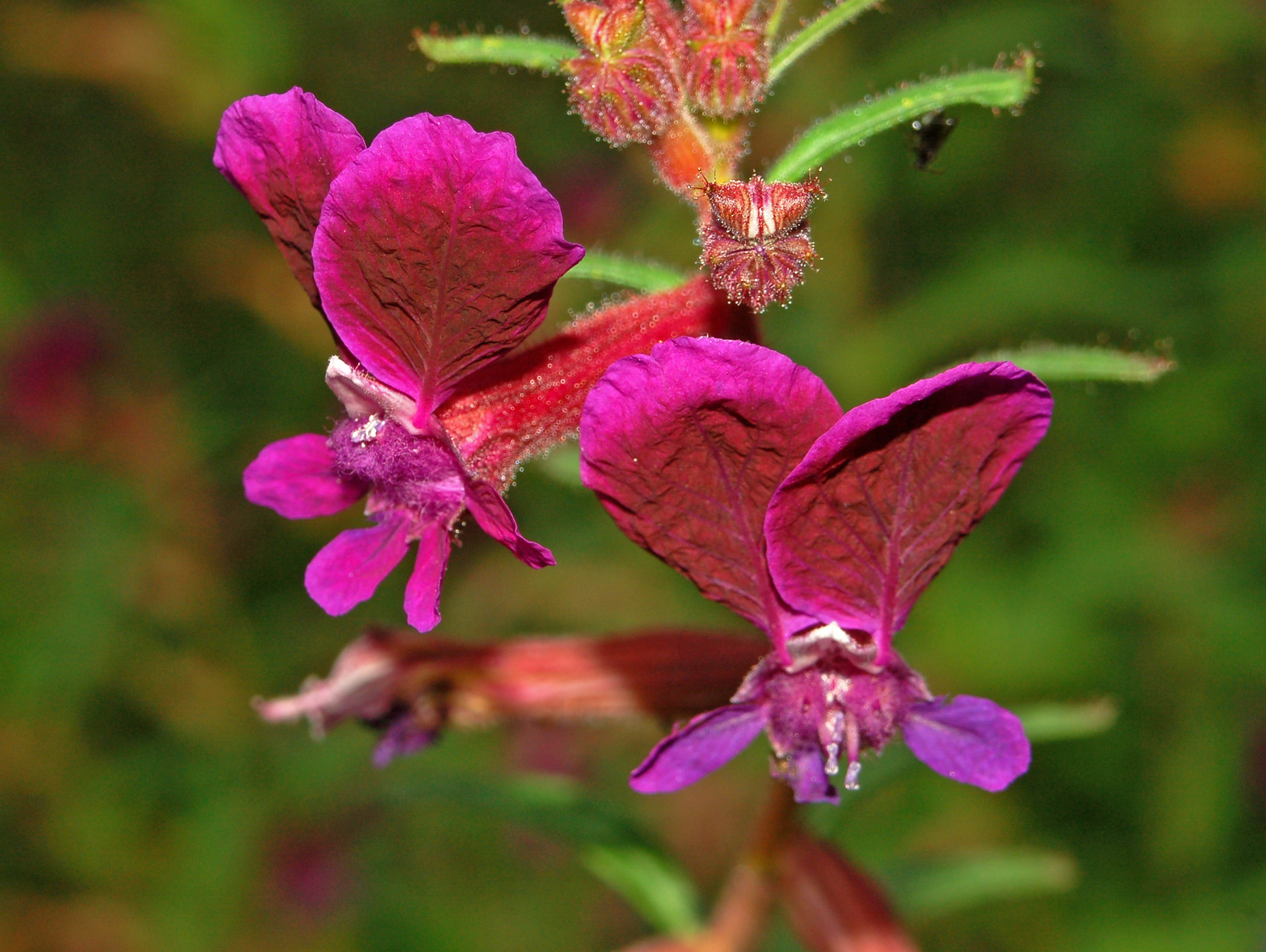
Flowers of Cuphea lanceolata

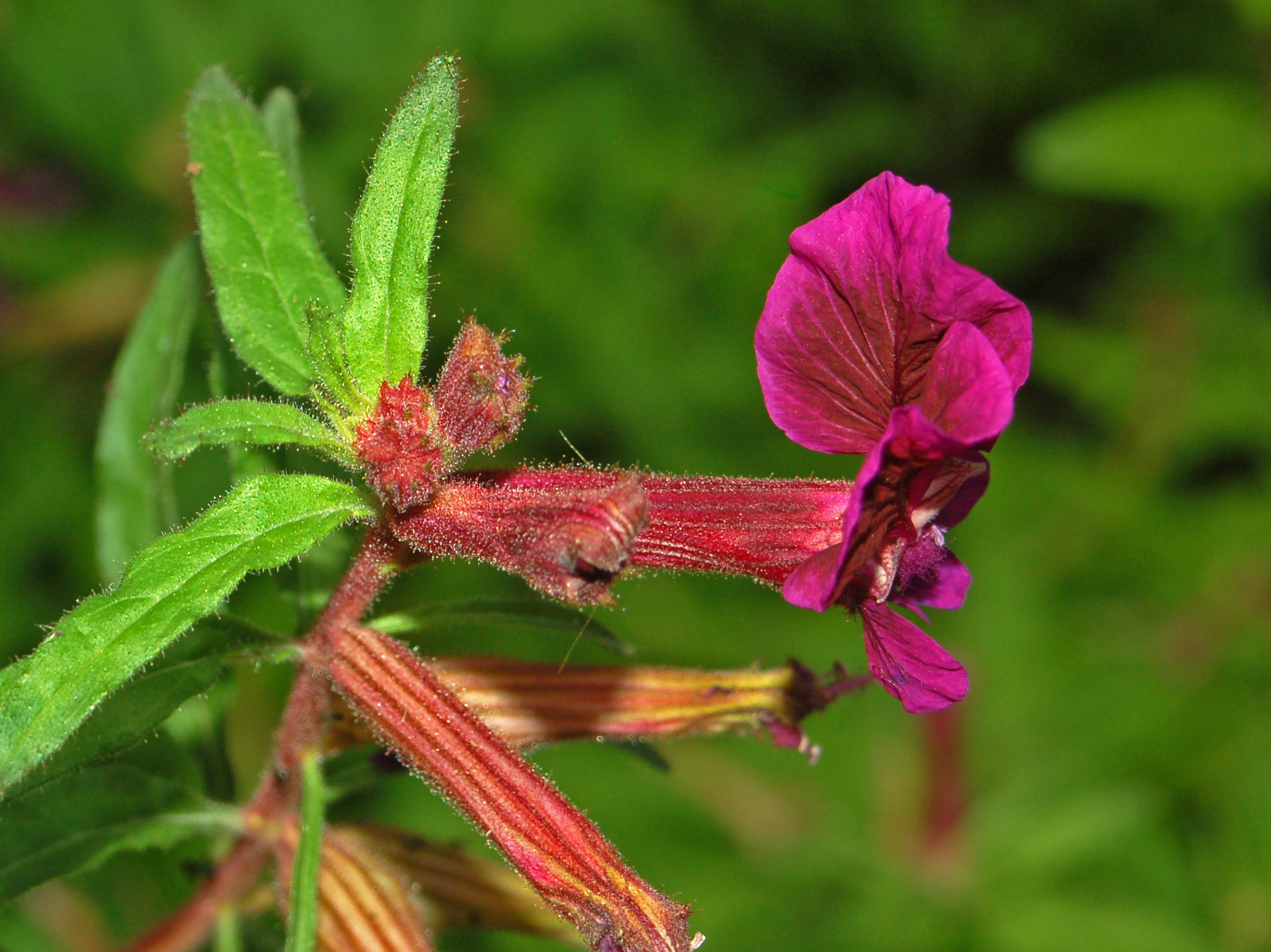
Flower of Cuphea lanceolata

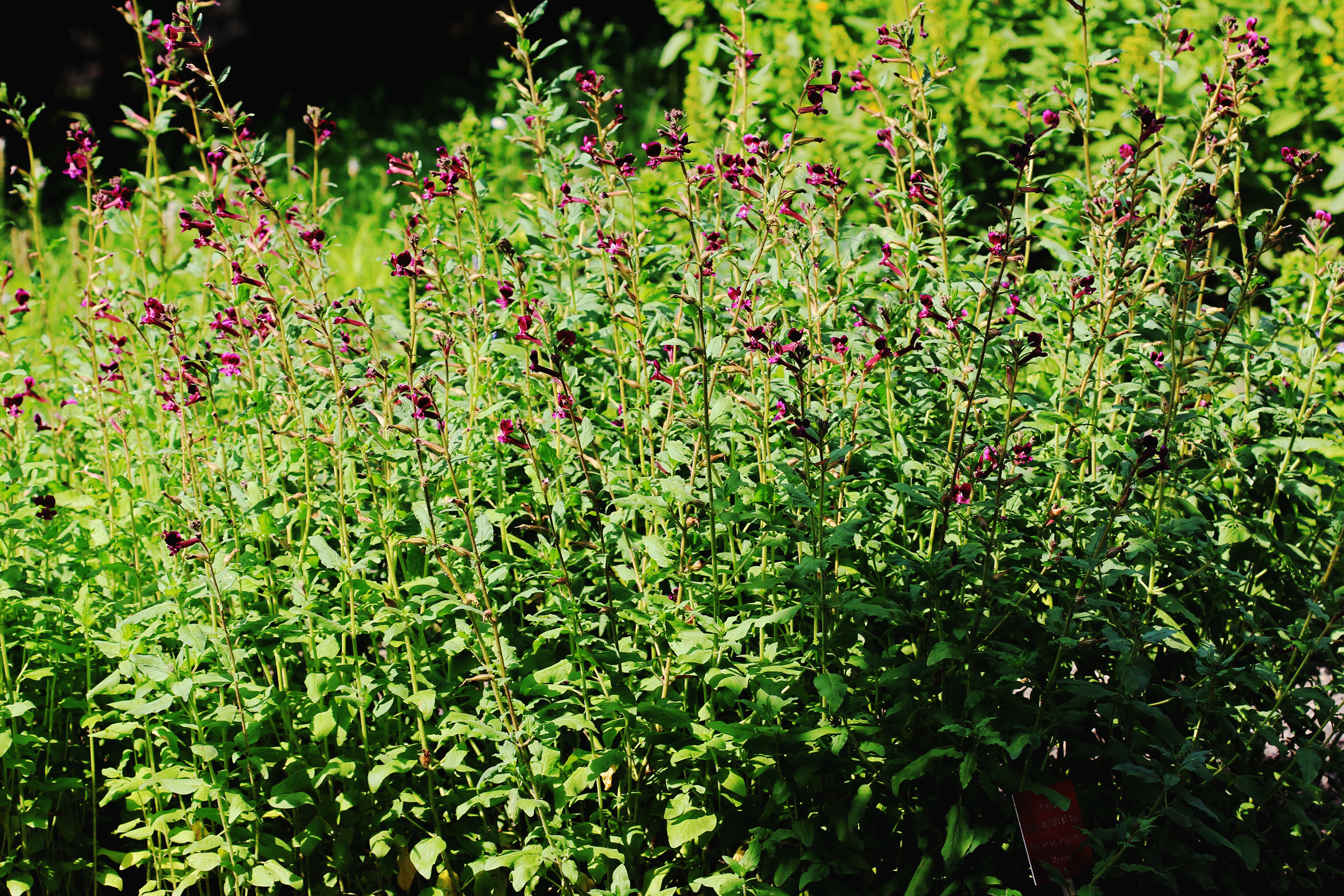
Plants of Cuphea lanceolata
