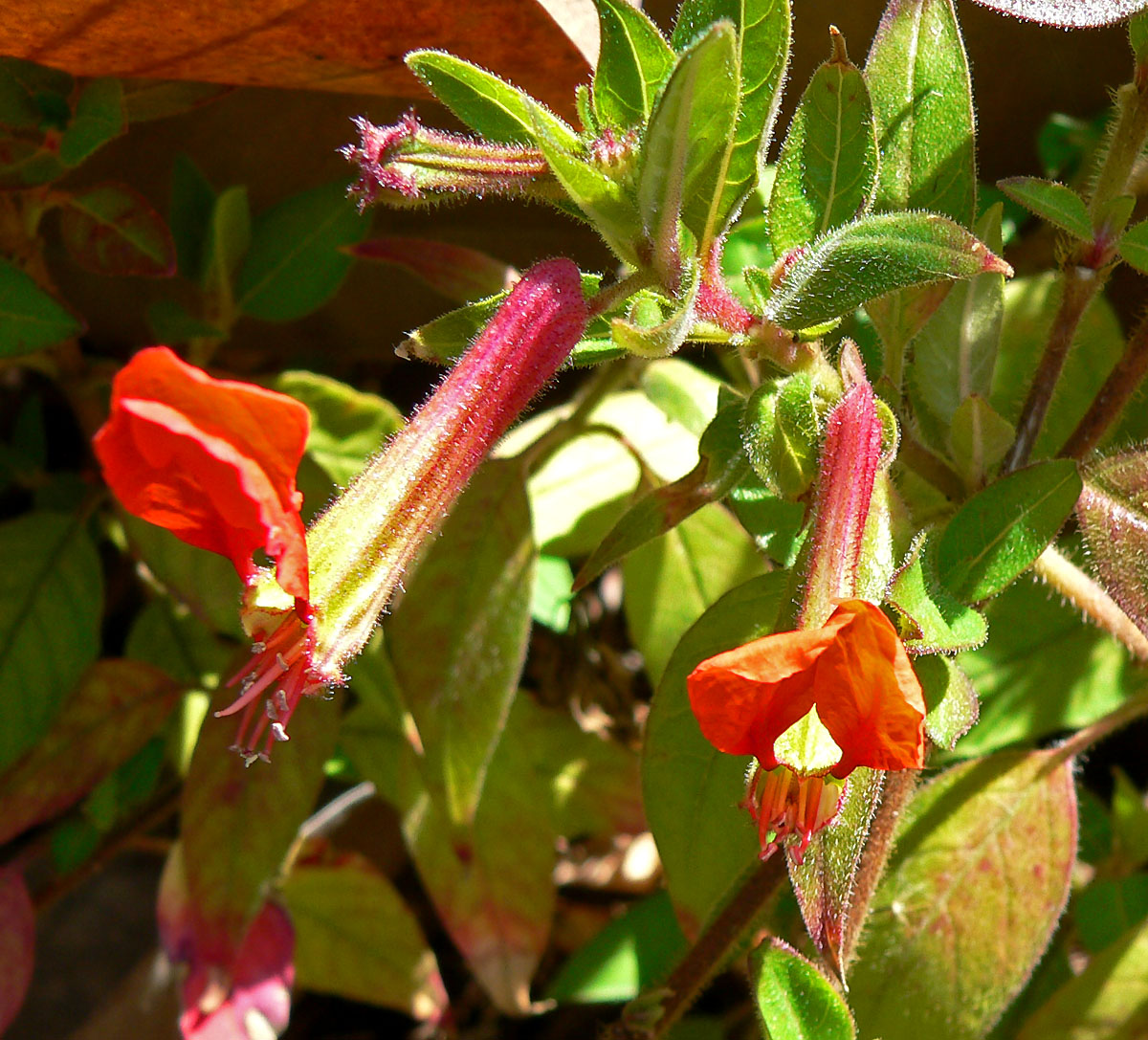
- Cuphea nudicostata

Scientific classification
- Kingdom: Plantae
- Clade: Embryophytes
- Clade: Tracheophytes
- Clade: Angiosperms
- Clade: Eudicots
- Clade: Rosids
- Order: Myrtales
- Family: Lythraceae
- Subfamily: Lythroideae
- Genus: Cuphea; P.Browne

Species
- Some 260, see text

Synonyms
- List: Balsamona Vand.; Banksia Dombey ex DC.; Bergenia Raf.; Cuphaea Moench, orth. var.; Dipetalon Raf.; Endecaria Raf.; Maja Klotzsch; Melanium P.Browne; Melfona Raf.; Melvilla A.Anderson; Parsonsia P.Browne; Quirina Raf.

= Cuphea =

Genus of flowering plants

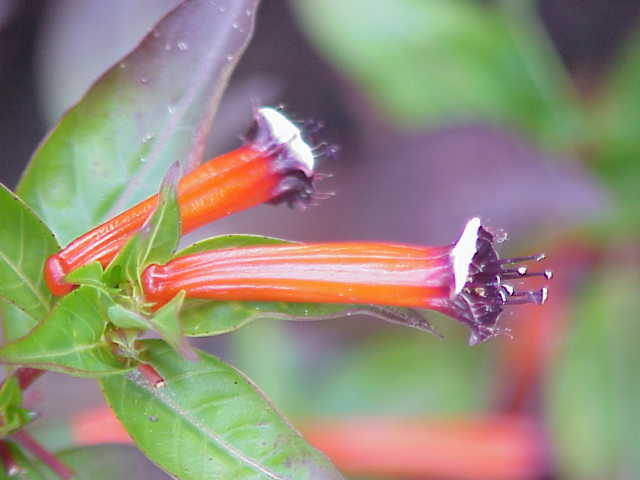
Cuphea ignea flowers resemble a tiny burning cigar in color, hence the common name "cigar plant".

Cuphea /ˈkjuːfiːə/ is a genus containing about 260 species of annual and perennial flowering plants native to warm temperate to tropical regions of the Americas. The species range from low-growing herbaceous plants to semi-woody shrubs up to 2 m (6 ft 7 in) tall. Commonly they are known as cupheas, or, in the case of some species, as cigar plants. The generic name is derived from the Greek word κυφος (kyphos), meaning "bent," "curved," or "humped."

== Uses ==
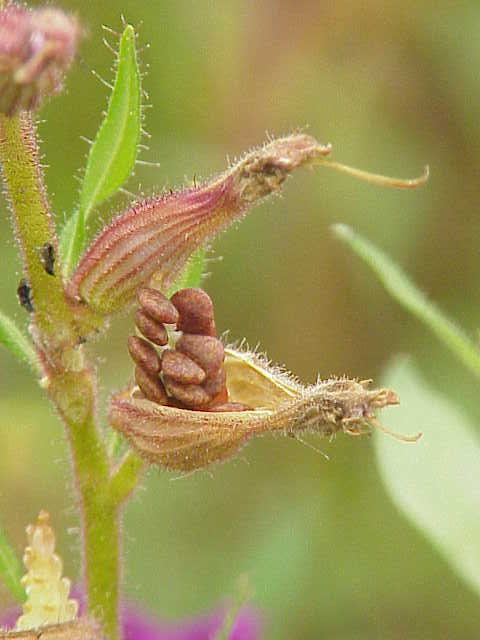
False Heather (C. hyssopifolia) fruit with seeds

Several Cuphea species are popular ornamental plants or honey plants. C. ignea 'David Verity' and C. micropetalia are popular plants to attract hummingbirds.

Some species of Cuphea are used to produce cuphea oil, of interest as sources of medium-chain triglycerides. For most purposes, cuphea oil is identical to coconut oil and palm oil; these are derived from strictly tropical plants however and – particularly in the latter case – the expanding production of which has caused a considerable amount of habitat destruction. Cuphea may thus produce a valuable source of income for farmers in temperate regions, and by supplementing coconut and palm oil to satisfy the growing demand (e.g. for biodiesel production) at the same time decreasing the need for wholesale logging in tropical countries. Early attempts at commercial production have focused on an interspecific hybrid population derived from C. lanceolata and Clammy Cuphea (C. viscosissima).

Cuphea has also been shown to improve agricultural crops in North America when used in crop rotation. Crop rotation is commonly practiced among farmers to improve soil quality, control host-specific pests, and decrease the use of fertilizers and pesticides. When cuphea was introduced into the crop rotation of corn and wheat, scientists from the Agricultural Research Service of the USDA found that the addition of cuphea had positive effects on the following harvest, including a higher yield of crop and crops that are higher in protein. Such research reveals how cuphea can be used in agriculture to increase the profitability of crops like wheat and corn.

The seed oils of some species are very rich in one particular fatty acid. C. painteri oil, for example, is about three-quarters caprylic acid; C. carthagenensis oil consists of about 80% lauric acid. C. koehneana oil may be the richest natural source of a single fatty acid, with 95% of its content consisting of capric acid. Currently the plant is not commonly used for medicinal effects; however, chemical analysis of its fatty oils suggest the plant could possibly serve as an algicidal, fungicidal or antibiotic agent. There is also reason to believe the plant could be effective as an appetite stimulant.

== Selected species ==
254 species are currently accepted. Selected species include:

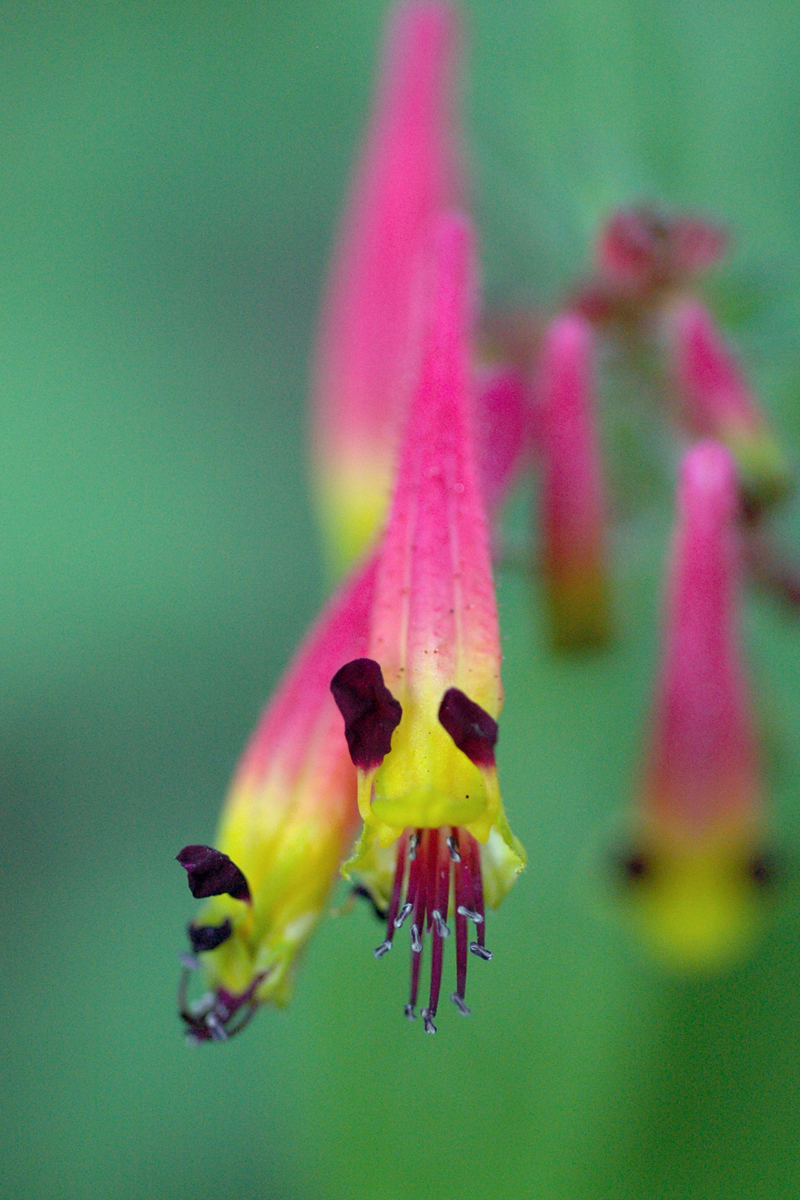
Cuphea cyanea flowers

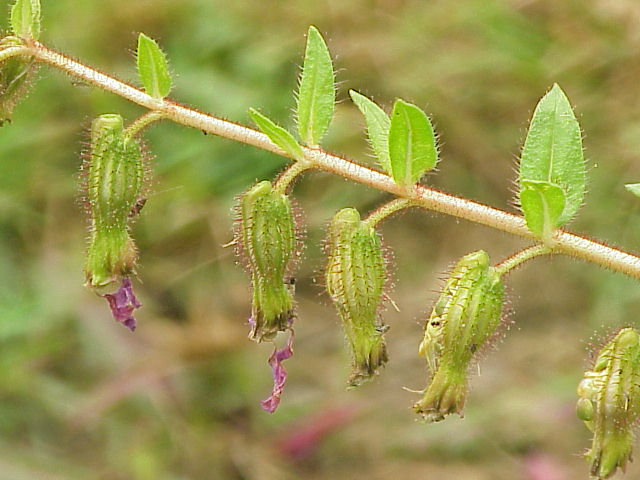
Cuphea procumbens fruits

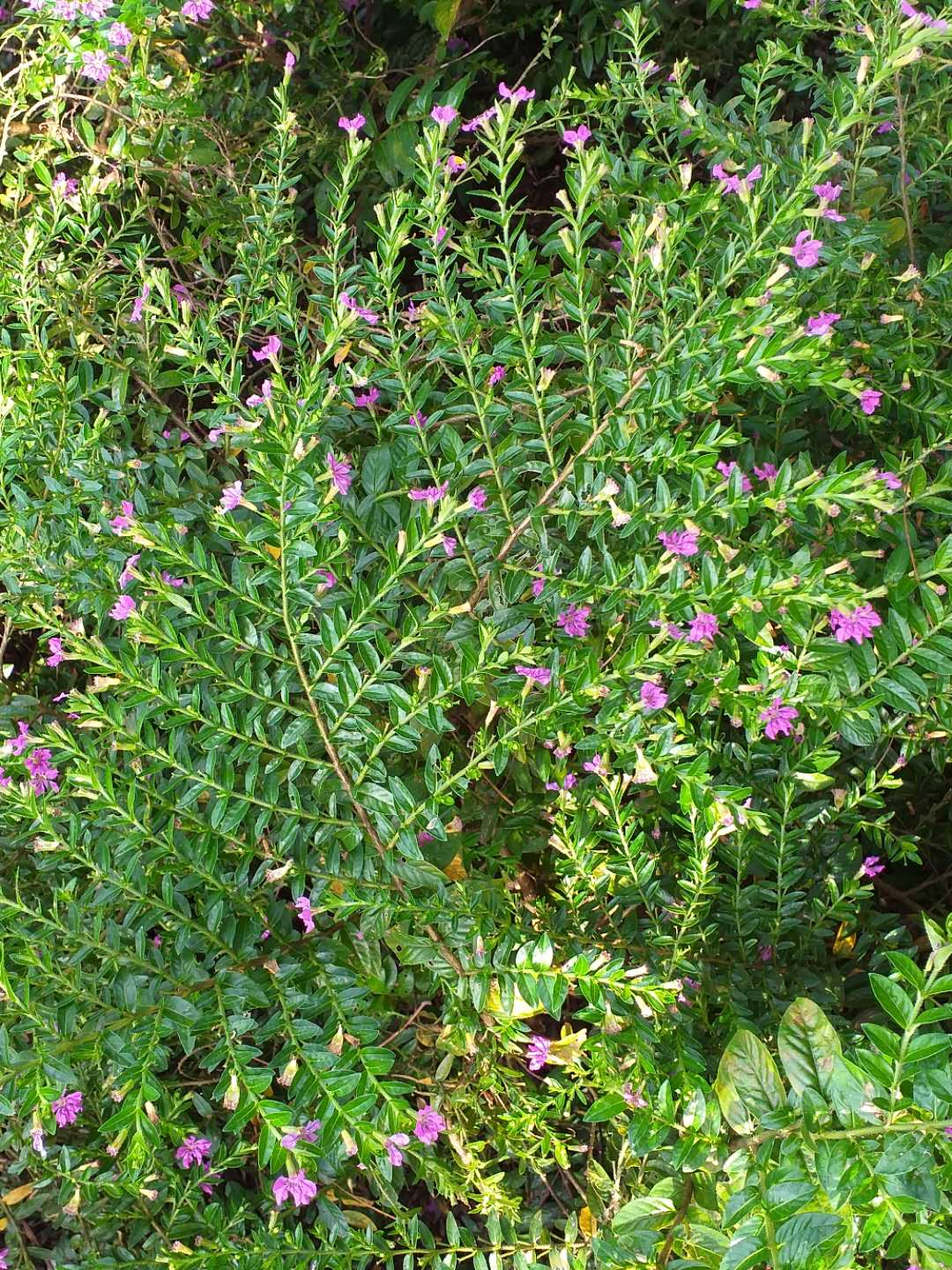
Cuphea hyssopifolia branch structure

- Cuphea aspera Chapman
- Cuphea carthagenensis (Jacq.) J.F.MacBr.
- Cuphea cyanea DC.
- Cuphea decandra W.T.Aiton
- Cuphea epilobiifolia Koehne
- Cuphea gaumeri Koehne
- Cuphea hookeriana Walp.
- Cuphea hyssopifolia Kunth – false heather, Mexican heather
- Cuphea ignea A.DC.
- Cuphea ingrata Cham. et Schltdl.
- Cuphea jorullensis Kunth
- Cuphea koehneana Rose
- Cuphea laminuligera Koehne
- Cuphea lanceolata W.T.Aiton
- Cuphea linarioides Cham. et Schltdl.
- Cuphea llavea Lex. – bat-faced cuphea
- Cuphea lutea Rose
- Cuphea lutescens Hoehne
- Cuphea melvilla Lindl. (synonym Cuphea elegans Klotzsch ex Koehne)
- Cuphea mesostemon Koehne
- Cuphea micropetala Kunth
- Cuphea nudicostata Hemsl.
- Cuphea painteri Rose
- Cuphea parsonsia (L.) R.Br. ex Steud. – island wax weed
- Cuphea procumbens Ortega
- Cuphea salvadorensis Standl. (synonym Cuphea oreophila Brandegee ex Bacig.)
- Cuphea speciosa Mart.
- Cuphea strigulosa Kunth
- Cuphea viscosissima Jacq. – clammy cuphea, blue waxweed, tarweed
- Cuphea wrightii A.Gray
