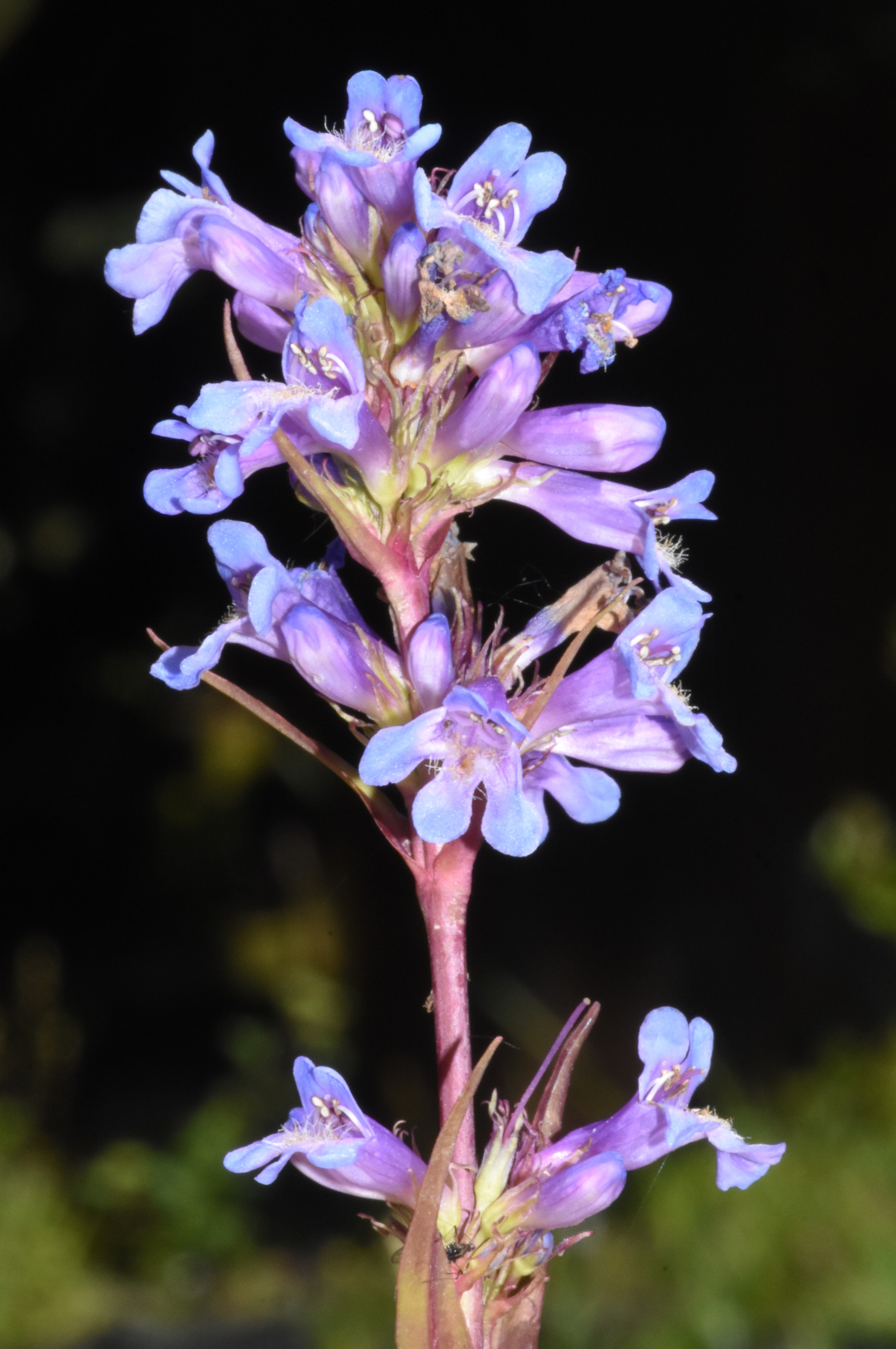

Conservation status
- Critically Imperiled (NatureServe)

Scientific classification
- Kingdom: Plantae
- Clade: Tracheophytes
- Clade: Angiosperms
- Clade: Eudicots
- Clade: Asterids
- Order: Lamiales
- Family: Plantaginaceae
- Genus: Penstemon
- Species: P. hesperius

Binomial name
- Penstemon hesperius M.E.Peck

= Penstemon hesperius =

Plant species in the veronica family

Penstemon hesperius, the tall western penstemon, is a rare species that is mostly found in the lower Willamette Valley and in one nearby location in Washington state in the northwestern US.

== Description ==
The tall western penstemon is a long lived herbaceous perennial that is dormant in the winter. Each plant can grow as many as 100 flowering stems, each typically 50 to 80 centimeters (20–31 in) tall. However, in shady areas the average stem length is 1.4 meters (4.6 ft) and can reach as much as 1.6 m (5.3 ft). Plants spread vegetatively through layering and rooting at stem nodes to form large mats often as wide as 1.8 metres (6 ft) and in one instance 7 m (23 ft) across. The stems are quite thick at the base, often 1 centimeter (0.4 in) or more in diameter. The stems are bright green and hairless, but can sometimes be covered in very short and fairly stiff hairs near where the flowers are attached.

The plants have both basal leaves and leaves attached to the stems that are 4–9 centimeters (1.5–3.5 in) long including the short leaf stem and are narrowly elliptical in shape. The basal leaves form a somewhat well developed rosette while the leaves attached in pairs to the stems clasp it with their bases, more so higher up.

The flowers are bright blue, though they can have a whitish lower side to the flower tube. Each inflorescence will have at least three clusters, each with many flowers.

== Taxonomy ==
The botanist Morton Peck described a new species of Penstemon in 1932, naming it Penstemon hesperius. The species was collected by David Douglas in 1825 near the future location of Vancouver, Washington, but it was confused with what became named Penstemon procerus by Robert Graham. The description of it as a distinct species by Peck was accepted by experts such as David D. Keck in his contribution on the genus to the 1951 Illustrated Flora of the Pacific States edited by LeRoy Abrams and Roxana Ferris. However, it was reduced to being a synonym of Penstemon rydbergii var. varians by Arthur Cronquist in 1959 and P. rydbergii var. oreocharis by Noel Herman Holmgren in 1984. The species was also unable to be located for over 70 years and feared extinct, until rediscovered in 2008 by Rachel Roberts and Ginny Maffitt in the Tualatin River National Wildlife Refuge. It was evaluated by John A. Christy and Maffitt in a 2018 article, where they reported it to be sufficiently distinct to be recognized and that penstemon experts Craig Freeman and Holmgren agreed with this conclusion. It is listed as an accepted species in Plants of the World Online and World Plants. Although evaluated by NatureServe, they have not yet made a final determination on if it is a valid species.

=== Names ===
Penstemon hesperius is known by the common name tall western penstemon.

== Range and habitat ==
Tall western penstemons grow in the lower Willamette Valley in Oregon and one area across the border into Washington. Though it grows in two states it is a narrow endemic, only growing in a small geographic area in a rare habitat type. There are a total of 21 populations of the species, five of these were naturally reproducing when located again and the remaining 16 created by reintroduction efforts.

The species primarily grows in wet prairies, but also grow in seasonally wet Oregon white oak (Quercus garryana) and Oregon ash (Fraxinus latifolia) woodlands, other wetlands, and forests alongside rivers with sufficient openings. This is an unusual habitat for a penstemon species, though P. rydbergii var. oreocharis also grows in seasonally wet areas, but above 910 meters (3,000 ft), where the tall western penstemon only grows at less than 150 meters (500 ft) in elevation.

=== Conservation ===
The conservation organization NatureServe evaluated the tall western penstemon in 2019 and rated it as critically imperiled at the global level and in both Washington and Oregon (G1, S1) due to a very limited habitat threatened by city development. In 2020 the United States Fish and Wildlife Service (USFWS) was petitioned by the Center for Biological Diversity and the Native Plant Society of Oregon to list the species for protection under the Endangered Species Act. This was denied by the USFWS in 2026 with the reasoning that though the population in Washington is threatened the area is six percent of the range and in their view is not "significant" and all areas where the plant currently grows in Oregon are protected or managed by public agencies.

== See also ==
- List of Penstemon species
