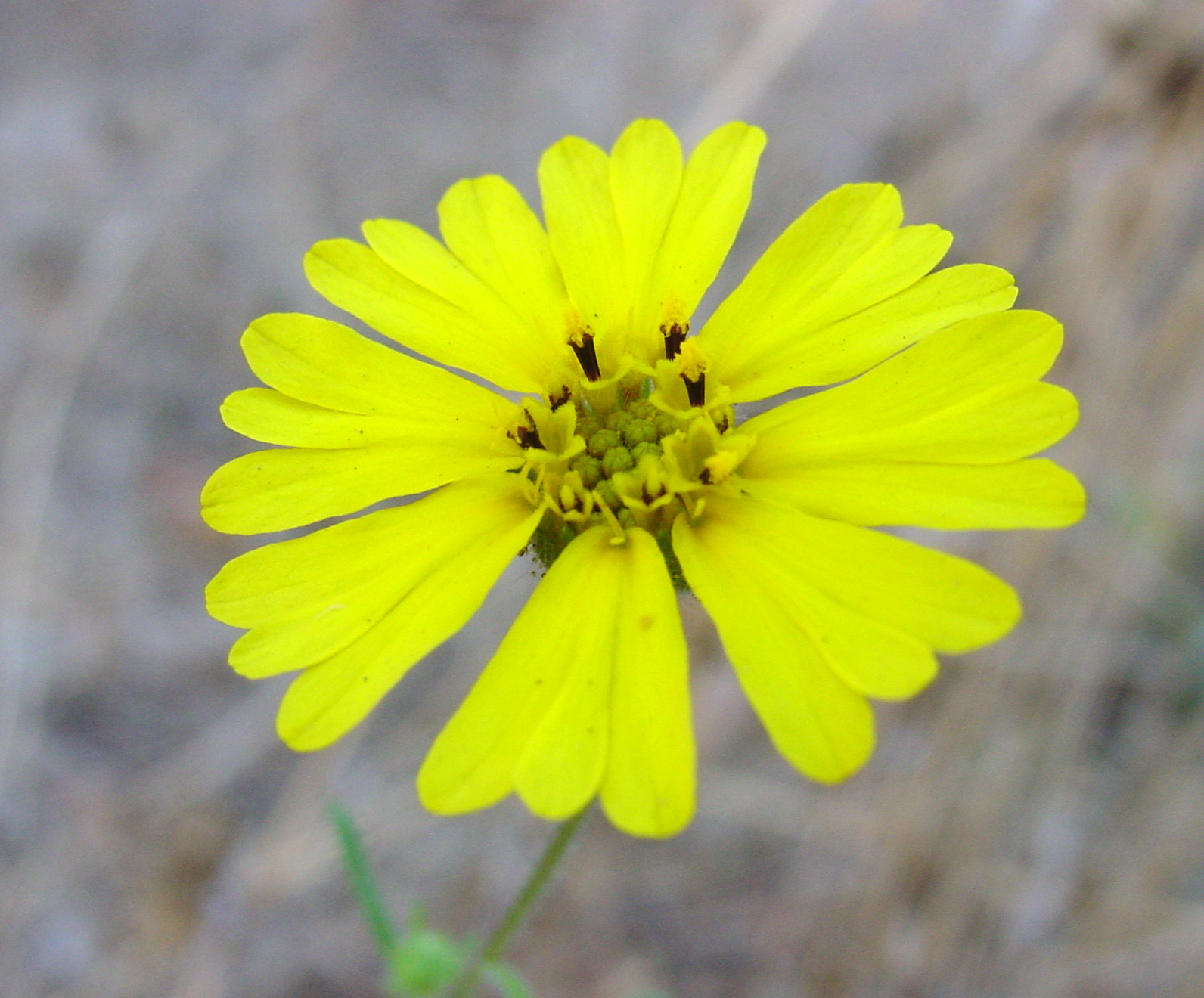
- Madia elegans

Scientific classification
- Kingdom: Plantae
- Clade: Tracheophytes
- Clade: Angiosperms
- Clade: Eudicots
- Clade: Asterids
- Order: Asterales
- Family: Asteraceae
- Subfamily: Asteroideae
- Tribe: Madieae
- Subtribe: Madiinae
- Genus: Madia; Molina 1782

Synonyms
- Madaria DC.; Harpaecarpus Nutt.; Biotia Cass.; Amida Nutt.; Madorella Nutt.; Madariopsis Nutt.

= Madia =

Genus of flowering plants

Madia is a genus of annual or perennial usually aromatic herbs with yellow flowers, in the tribe Madieae within the family Asteraceae.

They are sometimes known as tarweeds. The species in this genus are native to western North America and southwestern South America. The name Madia is derived from native Chilean name ("Madi") for one of the members of the genus (Madia sativa). Tarweeds derive their common name from the intense stickiness of the plant.

== Uses ==
Tarweeds produce abundant seed, are agreeably aromatic and oily, and form an important part of the small seeds used in pinole. Tarweed and other seeds in pinole formed a staple food in the diet of the Indigenous peoples of the Pacific Coast. In particular, the seeds of gumweed (Madia elegans ssp. densifolia) were among the most valued by the Miwok people for pinole. The Hupa, Cahuilla, Diegueño, Chumash, Costanoan, Kawaiisu, and Maidu tribes in California made pinole from Madiaspecies.

== Ecology ==
The dark seeds (achenes) of tarweeds are used as food by many birds and small mammals, including mourning doves, quail, blackbirds, finches, Oregon juncos, California horned larks, western meadowlarks, American pipits, sparrows, towhees, chipmunks, ground squirrels, and mice. Cottontail rabbits, ground squirrels, and chipmunks eat the plants.

== Taxonomy ==
=== Species ===
There are 11 accepted species of Madia.

- Madia anomala Greene - plumpseeded madia - northern CA
- Madia chilensis (Nutt.) Reiche - central Chile
- Madia citrigracilis D.D.Keck - Shasta tarweed - northern CA
- Madia citriodora Greene - lemon-scented madia - northern CA, NV, OR, WA, ID
- Madia elegans D.Don ex Lindl. - common madia - northern CA, NV, OR, WA
- Madia exigua (Sm.) A.Gray - small tarweed - CA OR WA NV ID MT BC, Baja California
- Madia glomerata Hook. - mountain tarweed - mountains of western United States; scattered locales in Canada and in north-central + northeastern United States
- Madia gracilis (Sm. ex Sm.) D.D.Keck - grassy tarweed - CA OR WA NV ID UT MT BC
- Madia radiata Kellogg - golden madia - CA
- Madia sativa Molina - coast tarweed - CA OR WA NV ID BC; scattered populations in eastern Canada + northeastern United States; southern Argentina, southern Chile
- Madia subspicata D.D.Keck - slender tarweed - CA

Several genera have been split from Madia, including, Anisocarpus, Harmonia, Jensia and Kyhosia. Species include:

- Madia bolanderi - Kyhosia bolanderi
- Madia doris-nilesiae - Harmonia doris-nilesiae
- Madia hallii - Harmonia hallii
- Madia madioides - Anisocarpus madioides
- Madia minima - Hemizonella minima
- Madia nutans - Harmonia nutans
- Madia stebbinsii - Harmonia stebbinsii
- Madia yosemitana - Jensia yosemitana
