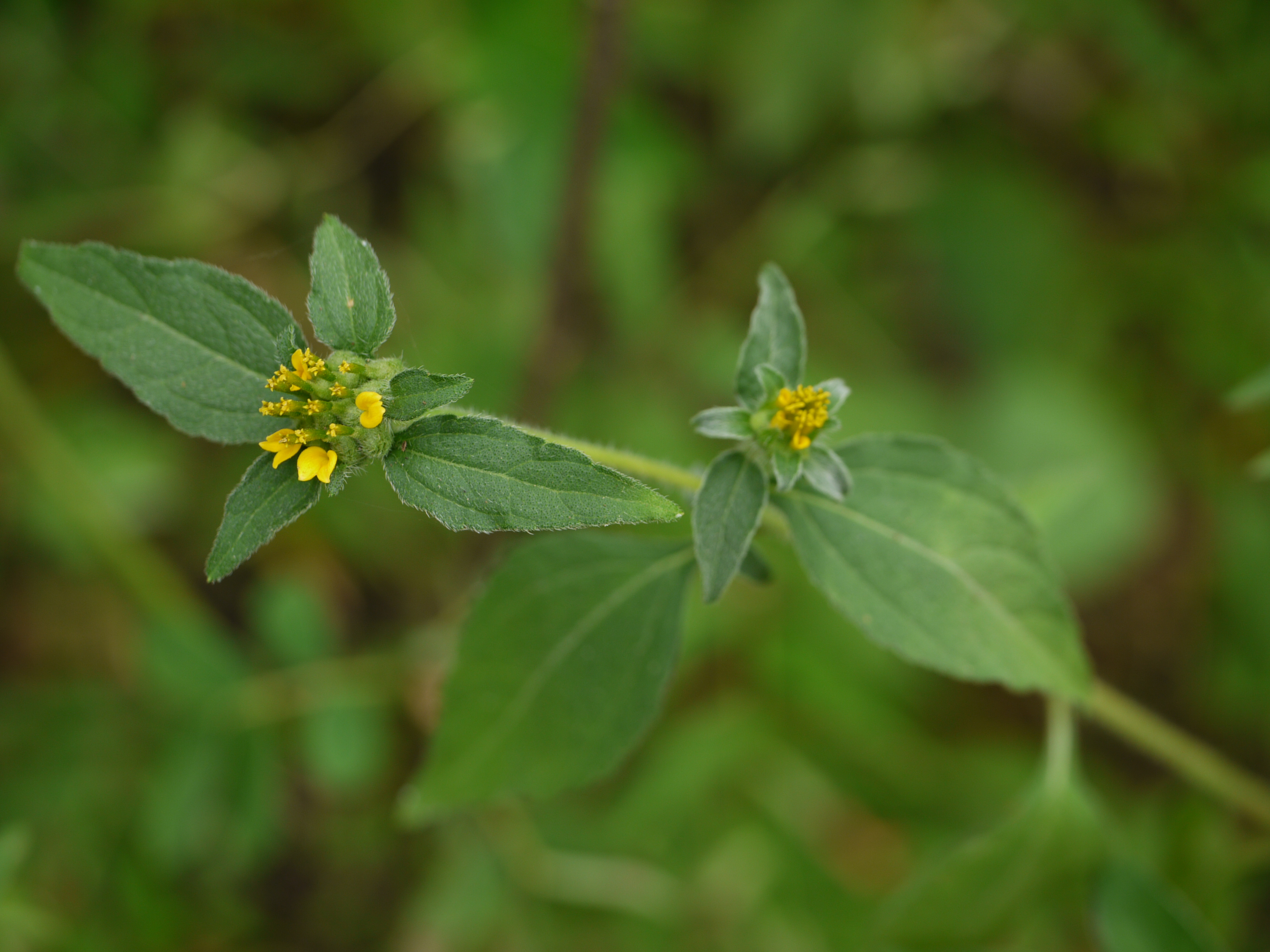
- Sclerocarpus africanus

Scientific classification
- Kingdom: Plantae
- Clade: Tracheophytes
- Clade: Angiosperms
- Clade: Eudicots
- Clade: Asterids
- Order: Asterales
- Family: Asteraceae
- Subfamily: Asteroideae
- Tribe: Heliantheae
- Subtribe: Helianthinae
- Genus: Sclerocarpus; Jacq.

Type species
- Sclerocarpus africanus Jacq.

Synonyms
- Dichotoma Sch.Bip. ex Sch.Bip.

= Sclerocarpus =

Genus of plants

Sclerocarpus is a genus of flowering plants in the tribe Heliantheae within the family Asteraceae. Bonebract is a common name for plants in this genus.

It includes annuals and procumbent perennials which occur primarily in Mexico and Central America, with one species extending as far north as the state of Texas in the United States and another species widely distributed across the West Indies, South America, Africa, and Asia. The genus is distinguished morphologically by the pales, which are modified to completely and tightly enclose the mature cypsela (achene) and often have a tuberculate surface. Some species of Aldama have a somewhat similar modification of the pales but in those the pale surface is irregularly wrinkled and pitted rather than tuberculate. Sclerocarpus is a member of the sunflower subtribe, Helianthinae, and is placed by molecular data as a relatively basal member of the group.

The plant Sclerocarpus africanus (Jacq), locally known in Igbo dialect (Nigeria) as “nli-atulu” and Manding language (Senegal) as Bambara-goni, is used for treating gonorrhea and other venereal diseases in Nigerian ethno-medicine. Phytochemical screening showed presence of carbohydrates, tannins and saponins. Flavonoids and anthraquinone glycosides were found only in the ethanol and methanol extracts. Anti-microbial screening of methanol and ethanol extracts showed activity against the following human pathogens: Staphylococcus aureus, Salmonella typhi, Streptococcus pyogenes, Shigella dysenteriae, Candida albicans and Candida thrusei, with MIC value of 2.5 mg/ml; while Neisseria gonorrhoeae was inhibited at MIC 1.25 mg/ml.which had an observered MBC of 5 mg/ ml for ethanol extract. Similar MBC/MFC values were obtained for methanol extract except Shigella dysenteriae which had MBC of 5 mg/ml. Petroleum ether extract was active against S. aureus, S. typhi, S. dysenteriae and N. gonorrhoeae with MIC value of 5 mg/ml and MBC/MFC value 10 mg/ml; no activity was observed for S. pyogenes, C. albicans and C. thrusei; N. gonorrhoeae was most inhibited. Results obtained justify the ethno-medicinal use of this plant in treatment of gonorrhea and other venereal diseases caused by the test micro organisms.

Species

- Sclerocarpus africanus Jacq. - Africa, Asia, West Indies
- Sclerocarpus baranguillae (Spreng.) S.F.Blake - Colombia
- Sclerocarpus divaricatus (Benth.) Benth. & Hook. - from Colombia to Chihuahua
- Sclerocarpus multifidus Greenm. - Guerrero, México State
- Sclerocarpus papposus (Greenm.) Feddema - Michoacán, Oaxaca, Morelos
- Sclerocarpus phyllocepalus S. F. Blake - Guatemala, Honduras, El Salvador, Nicaragua, Chiapas
- Sclerocarpus schiedeanus (DC.) Benth. & Hook.f. ex Hook.f. - México State
- Sclerocarpus sessifolius Greenm. - Sinaloa, Nayarit
- Sclerocarpus spatulatus Rose - Chihuahua, Sonora
- Sclerocarpus uniserialis (Hook.) Benth. & Hook. - from Texas to Guatemala

formerly included

see Aldama Madia Micractis

- Sclerocarpus dentatus - Aldama dentata
- Sclerocarpus discoideus - Micractis discoidea
- Sclerocarpus elongatus - Aldama dentata
- Sclerocarpus exiguus - Madia exigua
- Sclerocarpus gracilis - Madia gracilis
- Sclerocarpus kerberi - Aldama dentata
