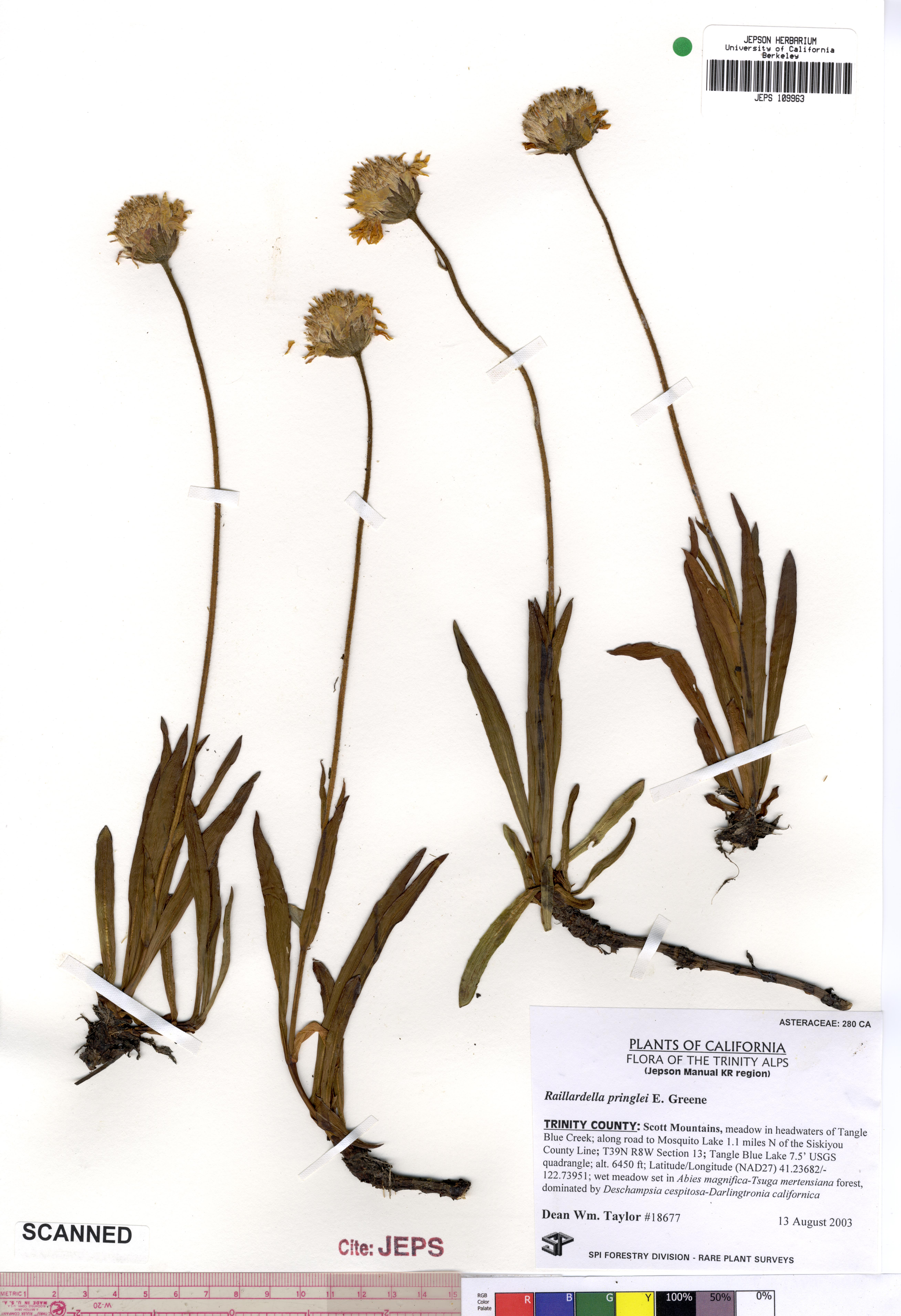
- Raillardella pringlei

Scientific classification
- Kingdom: Plantae
- Clade: Embryophytes
- Clade: Tracheophytes
- Clade: Angiosperms
- Clade: Eudicots
- Clade: Asterids
- Order: Asterales
- Family: Asteraceae
- Subfamily: Asteroideae
- Tribe: Madieae
- Subtribe: Madiinae
- Genus: Raillardella (A.Gray) Benth. & Hook.f.

Type species
- Raillardella argentea (A.Gray) A.Gray

Synonyms
- Railliardia sect. Raillardella A.Gray

= Raillardella =

Genus of plants

Raillardella is a genus of flowering plants in the tribe Madieae within the family Asteraceae.

The genus is native to the western United States (Oregon, California, and Nevada).

Species

- Raillardella argentea - California, Oregon, western Nevada
- Raillardella pringlei - California (Trinity + Siskiyou Cos)
- Raillardella scaposa - California, Oregon, western Nevada

Formerly included

See Anisocarpus, Arnica, Carlquistia.

- Raillardella muirii - Carlquistia muirii
- Raillardella paniculata - Arnica viscosa
- Raillardella scabrida - Anisocarpus scabridus
