= M. sativa =

M. sativa may refer to:

- Madia sativa, the coast tarweed or Chilean tarweed, a flowering plant species native to the Americas
- Medicago sativa, the alfalfa, a flowering plant species cultivated as an important forage crop

== See also ==
- Sativa
