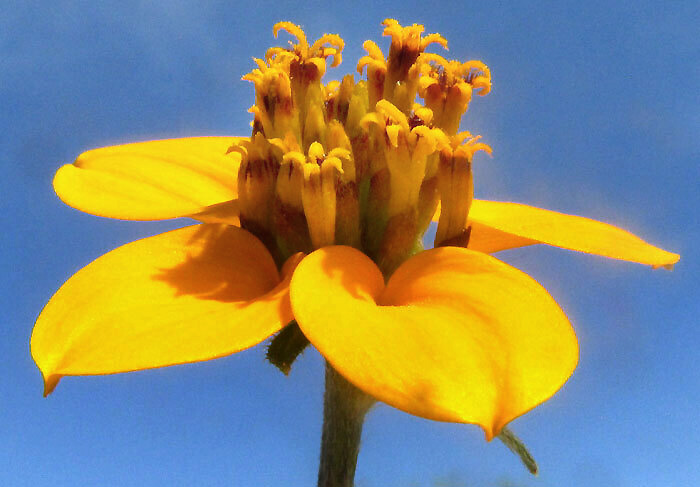
- Sclerocarpus uniserialis flowering head

Scientific classification
- Kingdom: Plantae
- Clade: Embryophytes
- Clade: Tracheophytes
- Clade: Angiosperms
- Clade: Eudicots
- Clade: Asterids
- Order: Asterales
- Family: Asteraceae
- Tribe: Heliantheae
- Genus: Sclerocarpus
- Species: S. uniserialis

Binomial name
- Sclerocarpus uniserialis (Hook.) Benth. & Hook.f. ex Hemsl., 1881

Synonyms
- Gymnolomia uniserialis (Hook.) Mottet (1893-1894); Gymnopsis uniserialis Hook. (1837)

= Sclerocarpus uniserialis =

Species of flowering plant

Sclerocarpus uniserialis, commonly known as Mexican bonebract, is a species of flowering plant belonging to the family Asteraceae.

== Description ==
The most prominent feature distinguishing species of Sclerocarpus from the other ~32,000 species of the family Asteraceae is this:

- Within the flowering heads, on the floor-like receptacule, scale-like bracts known as paleae occur between floret bases. The paleae thicken and harden as they mature, and completely enclose their adjacent one-seeded, cypsela-type fruits, forming structures called sclerocarps.

Below, in a dissected flower head, the immature but expanding paleae are somewhat spoon-shaped and mostly green but burgundy-hued at their tops; in the head's center, a palea has been removed, revealing the smooth cypsela.

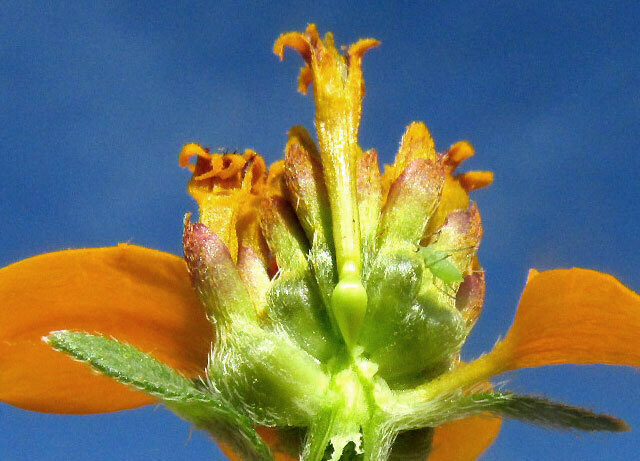
Sclerocarpus uniserialis , dissected head with paleae enlarging around cypselae

Sclerocarpus uniserialis is further recognized by these features:

- Mostly it grows as an erect but rarely leaning or prostrate herbaceous annual, though sometimes it can be perennial or sub-woody.
- It can reach 2 m (6 1/2 ft) tall.
- Leaves are broadest near their bases, with toothed margins.
- Up to 9 leaflike involucral bracts arranged more or less in one series below the flowering heads are up to 13 mm × 1.5 mm (1/2 in × 1/16 in).
- Petal-like ray florets at the flowering heads' margins at their tips develop 2 or 3 short, clustered teeth.
- All mature sclerocarp-type fruits are tipped with a prominent beak-like projection.
- Atop each fruit a Pappus forms a low crown the top margin of which can be deeply cut or uncut, or else rarely the crowns are absent.

== Distribution ==
Sclerocarpus uniserialis occurs in Texas in the US, south through Mexico into Belize and Guatemala. The iNaturalist map documenting observations by citizen scientists indicates that in Mexico it is absent from the northwestern parts, including Baja California.

== Habitat ==
In the US, Mexican Bonebract is described as inhabiting disturbed sites, caliche, limestone and sandy soils up to 300m in elevation (~1000 feet).

In Mexico Sclerocarpus uniserialis occurs in forests of oak, pine, oak-pine, humid mountain forests, tropical deciduous forests, chaparral, dry scrub, palm groves and disturbed areas up to 2450m in elevation (~8000 feet).

Sclerocarpus uniserialis has been documented as a weed in cultivated fields of tomato, corn, mango, okra and luffa. A study of agroecosystems in Mexico found Sclerocarpus uniserialis, of all weeds present, had the highest density per hectare (8,040,000 plants) in corn agroecosystems (~3,250,000 per acre).

== Human uses ==
=== In traditional medicine ===
Among Mexico's Huastec people, the Téenek, infusions of branches of Sclerocarpus uniserialis have been documented used to treat diarrhea.

=== As animal food ===
Sclerocarpus uniserialis has been documented being fed to horses.

== Taxonomy ==
Within the family Asteraceae, Sclerocarpus uniserialis belongs to the subfamily Asteroideae, the tribe Heliantheae, and the subtribe Helianthinae.

Within Sclerocarpus uniserialis, these two varieties are recognized:

- Sclerocarpus uniserialis frutescens (Brandegee) Feddema
- Sclerocarpus uniserialis rubridiscus Feddema

It's to be noted that in Mexico, the species' main distribution area, it's believed that there's such variation in the characters distinguishing the varieties that it's adequate to recognize the species without formal subdivisions.

In 1837, William Jackson Hooker formally described Sclerocarpus uniserialis under the basionym Gymnopsis uniserialis. He based his description on a collection by the Scottish botanical collector Thomas Drummond, his #135. The collection was one of a duplicate collection originating somewhere in Texas.

== Etymology ==
In the genus name Sclerocarpus, the Sclero- is from the Ancient Greek skleros meaning "hard". The -carpus is from the Greek karpos, meaning "fruit". This refers to the hard, bract-covered, cypsela-type fruits of bonebract species

In the species name uniserialis, uni comes from the New Latin ūnus, meaning "one". The -serialis is from the New Latin seriālis, meaning "series". When Hooker described the species, his first statement about the species, after he'd written the Latin description, indicates the "one series" he was thinking about. He wrote, "This has decidedly the scales of the involucre in a single series... " His involucral scales were the leafy bracts immediately below each flowering head.

== Gallery ==
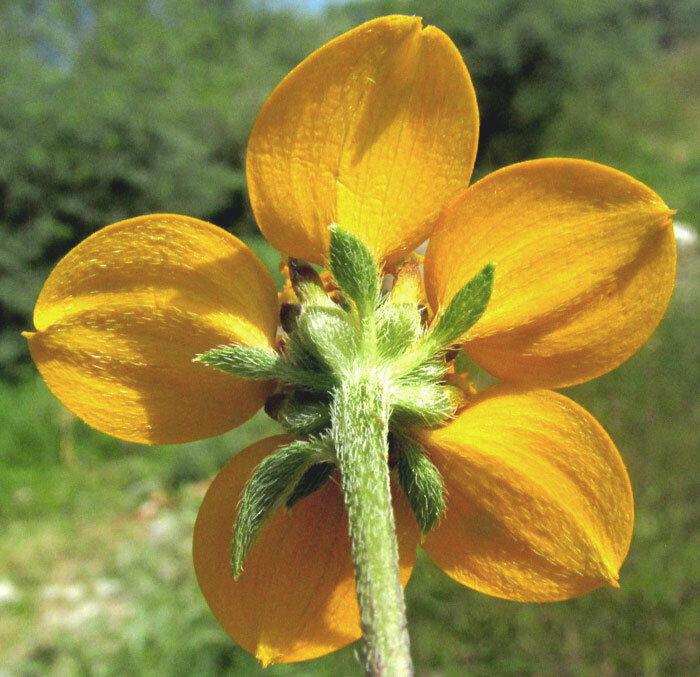
Sclerocarpus uniserialis with one series of leafy bracts below the flowering head

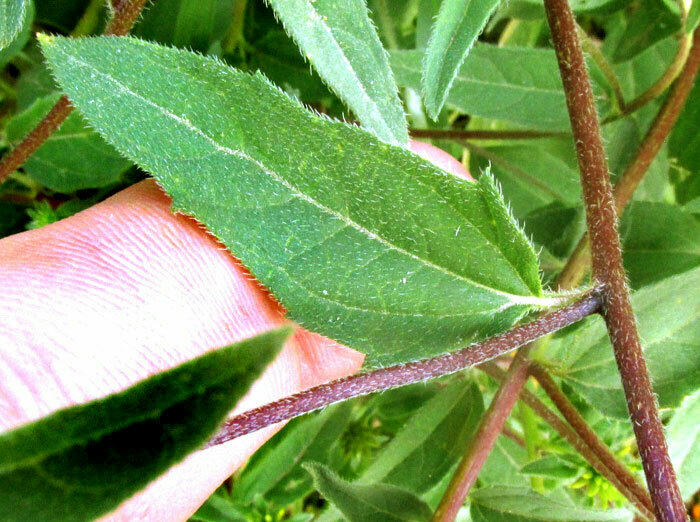
Sclerocarpus uniserialis leaves and stems

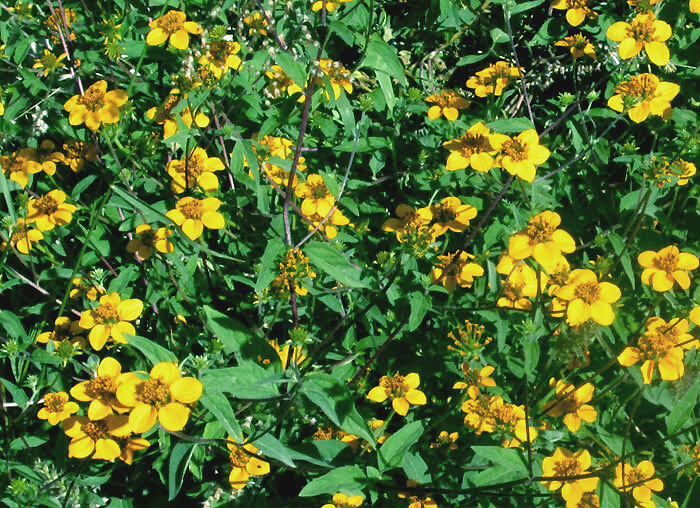
Sclerocarpus uniserialis roadside colony
