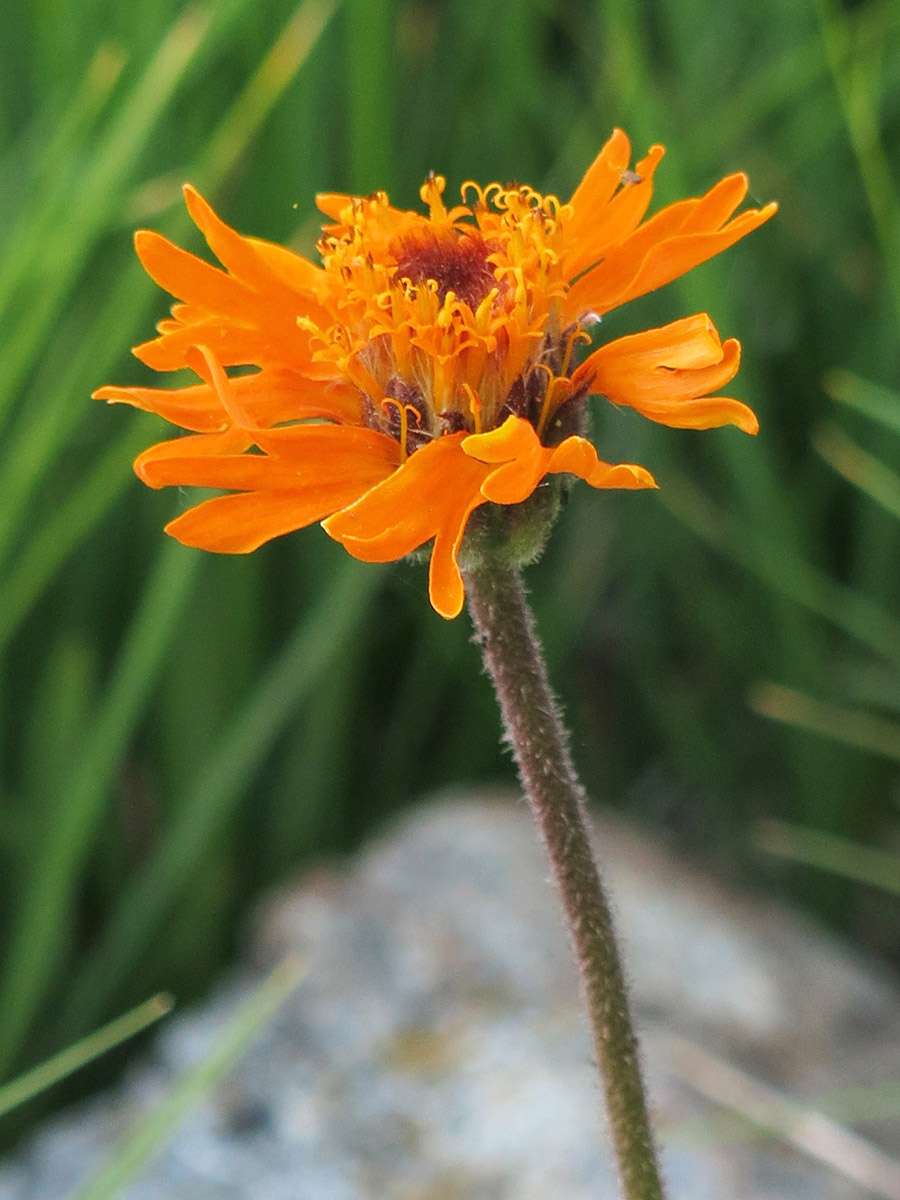

Conservation status
- Imperiled (NatureServe)

Scientific classification
- Kingdom: Plantae
- Clade: Tracheophytes
- Clade: Angiosperms
- Clade: Eudicots
- Clade: Asterids
- Order: Asterales
- Family: Asteraceae
- Genus: Raillardella
- Species: R. pringlei

Binomial name
- Raillardella pringlei Greene

= Raillardella pringlei =

Species of plant

Raillardella pringlei is an uncommon species of flowering plant in the family Asteraceae known by the common name showy raillardella.

== Description ==
Raillardella pringlei is a rhizomatous perennial herb growing in a clump of rosetted basal leaves. The leaves are linear to lance-shaped with smooth or faintly toothed edges, up to 15 centimeters long, and mostly hairless. Leaves also appear on the inflorescence in opposite pairs on a hairy-glandular stalk. The plant produces an inflorescence generally 25 centimeters to half a meter tall consisting of a solitary flower head or an array of up to three heads. The head is bell-shaped, sometimes widely so. It contains many orange to red-orange disc florets each about a centimeter long, and a fringe of several orange or reddish ray florets each up to 2 centimeters in length. The floral bract is densely covered with glandular hairs. The fruit is a long, narrow achene which may be 2 centimeters in length including its pappus of plumelike bristles.

== Range and Habitat ==
Raillardella pringlei is endemic to the southern Klamath Ranges of northern California, where it grows in moist forest habitat on serpentine soils.
