= Madia anomala =

Conservation status
- Vulnerable (NatureServe)

Scientific classification
- Kingdom: Plantae
- Clade: Tracheophytes
- Clade: Angiosperms
- Clade: Eudicots
- Clade: Asterids
- Order: Asterales
- Family: Asteraceae
- Genus: Madia
- Species: M. anomala

Binomial name
- Madia anomala Greene

Species of flowering plant

Madia anomala is a species of flowering plant in the family Asteraceae known by the common name plumpseeded madia. It is endemic to northern California, where it can be found on hillsides in the San Francisco Bay Area and adjacent mountains and valleys.

== Description ==
Madia anomala is an annual herb growing 20 to 50 centimeters tall with a bristly, glandular, branching stem. The hairy, glandular leaves are several centimeters long.

The inflorescence is a cluster of flower heads. Each head is a spherical involucre of hairy phyllaries covered in knobby resin glands. It spreads at the top with several yellow ray florets a few millimeters long and black-tipped disc florets.

The fruit is a shiny black achene with no pappus.
