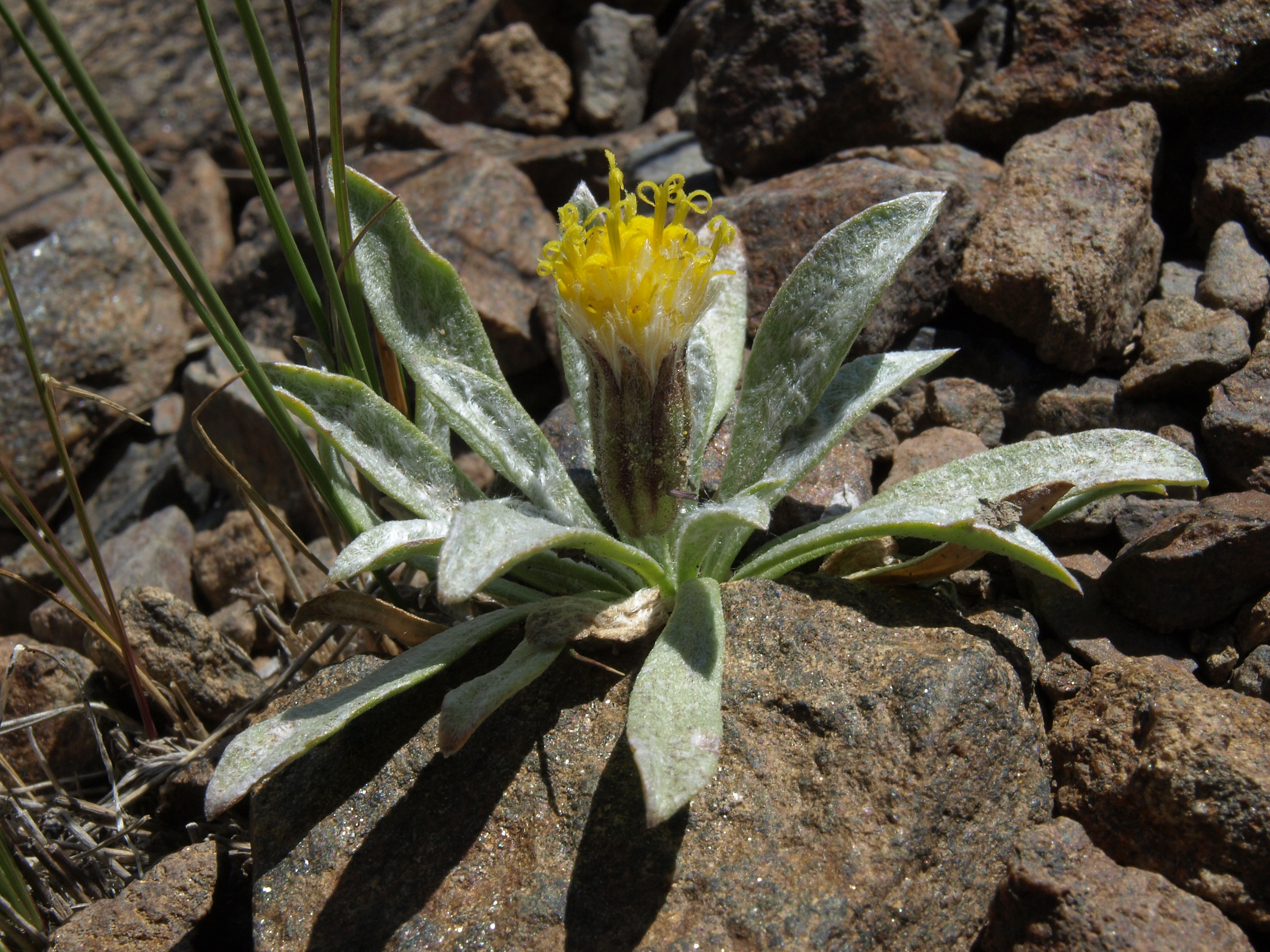

Scientific classification
- Kingdom: Plantae
- Clade: Tracheophytes
- Clade: Angiosperms
- Clade: Eudicots
- Clade: Asterids
- Order: Asterales
- Family: Asteraceae
- Genus: Raillardella
- Species: R. argentea

Binomial name
- Raillardella argentea (A.Gray) A.Gray

= Raillardella argentea =

Species of plant

Raillardella argentea is a species of flowering plant in the family Asteraceae known by the common name silky raillardella. It is native to the Sierra Nevada and nearby mountain ranges of California, with its distribution extending east into Nevada and north along the Cascade Range and Klamath Mountains into Oregon. It grows in many types of dry, open mountain habitat. It is a rhizomatous perennial herb growing in a clump of rosetted basal leaves. The leaves are lance-shaped, up to 8 centimeters long, and coated in silky hairs. The plant produces an inflorescence up to about 15 centimeters tall consisting of a solitary flower head which is cylindrical to somewhat bell-shaped. The head is enclosed in the fused outer scales of the flowers, which look similar to the phyllaries of many other species' flower heads. The head contains many yellow disc florets up to a centimeter long each, and no ray florets. The fruit is a long, narrow achene which may be 2 centimeters in length including its plumelike pappus.
