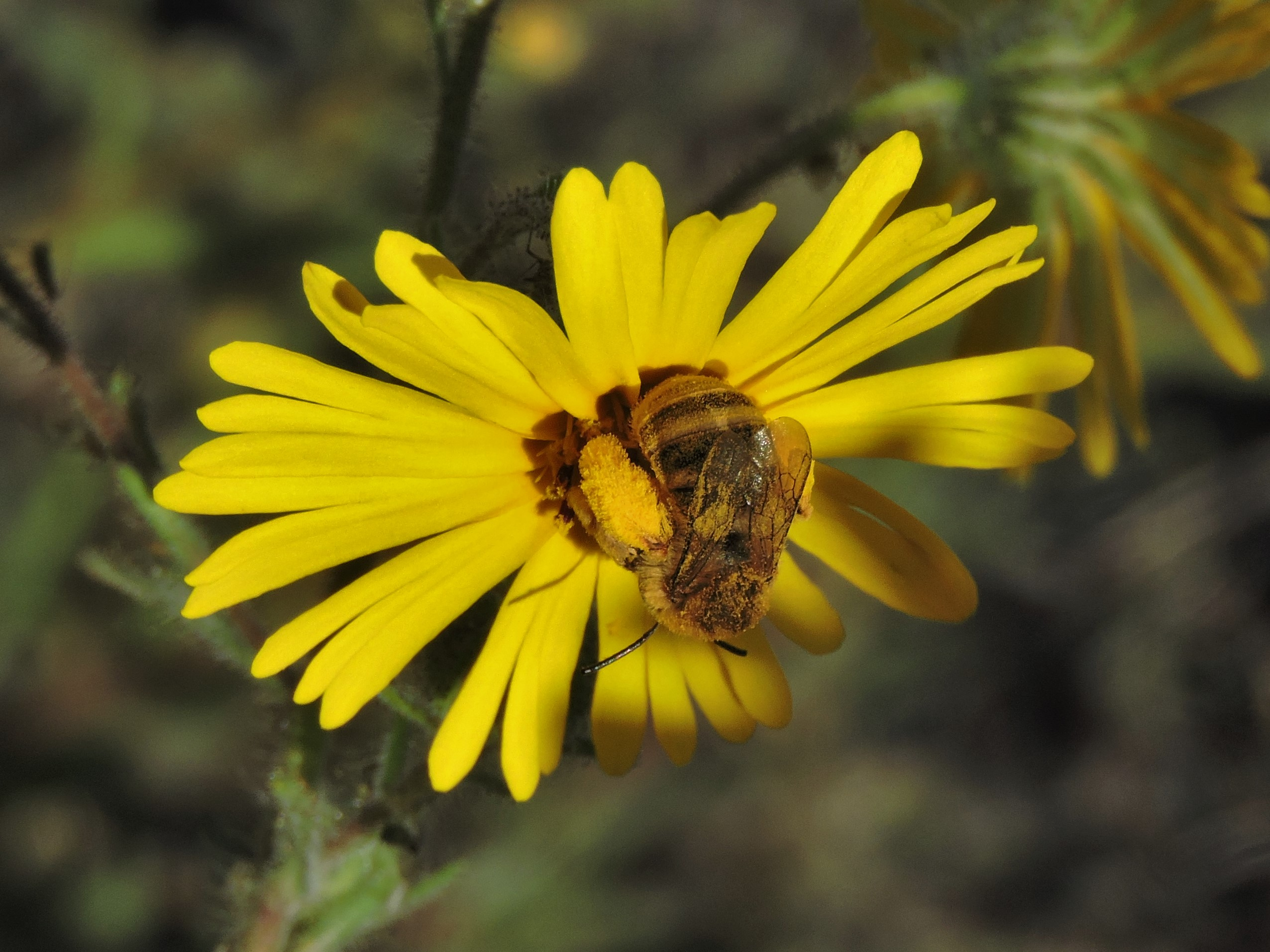
- Long-horned bee on flower head

Scientific classification
- Kingdom: Plantae
- Clade: Tracheophytes
- Clade: Angiosperms
- Clade: Eudicots
- Clade: Asterids
- Order: Asterales
- Family: Asteraceae
- Genus: Madia
- Species: M. elegans

Binomial name
- Madia elegans D.Don ex Lindl.

= Madia elegans =

Species of flowering plant

Madia elegans is an annual herbaceous plant species in the family Asteraceae. It is generally known as the common madia, but there are several subspecies known by various common names.

== Description ==
Madia elegans is covered with short, stiff hairs. Glands are borne on stalks, especially near the flowers. The showy flower varies in appearance across subspecies and even within subspecies. The leaves grow to 20 centimetres (8 inches) in length. Blooming between April and October, several strongly scented, uncrowded, bright yellow daisy-like flower heads grow at the end of a slender green stem, each typically 3–5 centimetres (1 1/4–2 inches) wide. The flower has numerous thin ray flowers, which close at night, and several central disk flowers. It may be solid lemon yellow or have a maroon center. Its fruits are achenes.

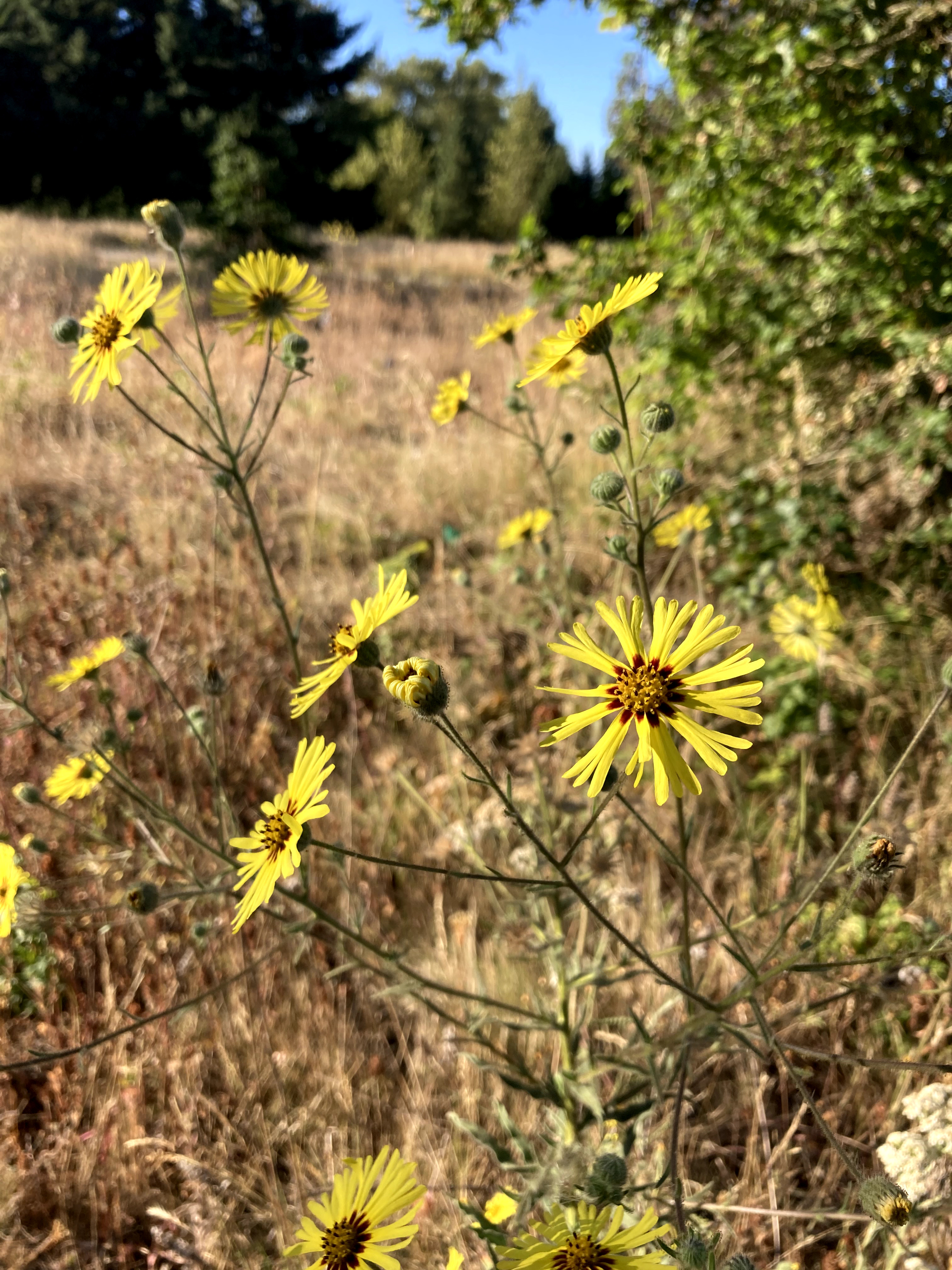
Growth with maroon-centered flower heads; Oregon

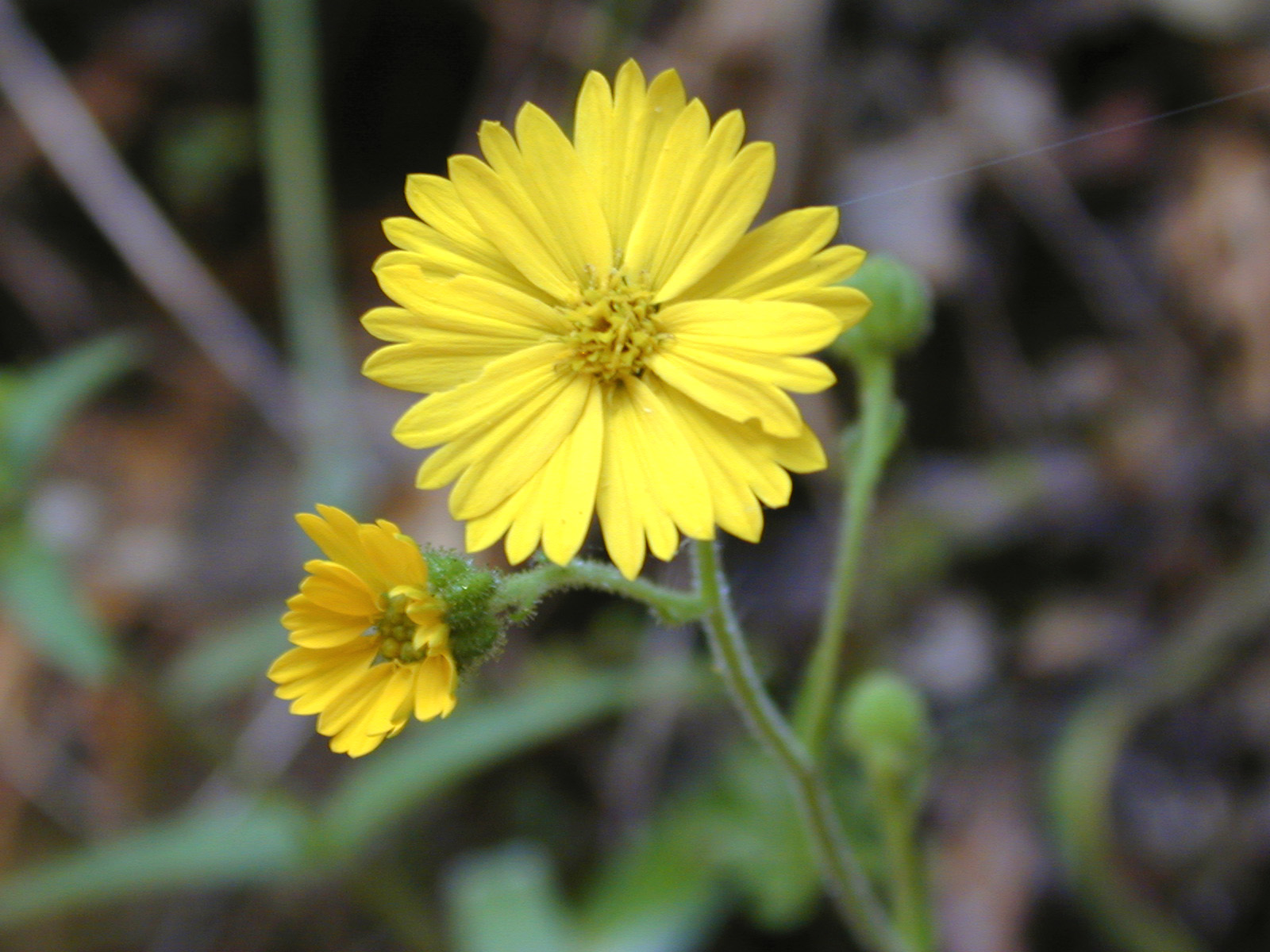
Stems and flowers; Santa Cruz Mountains, California

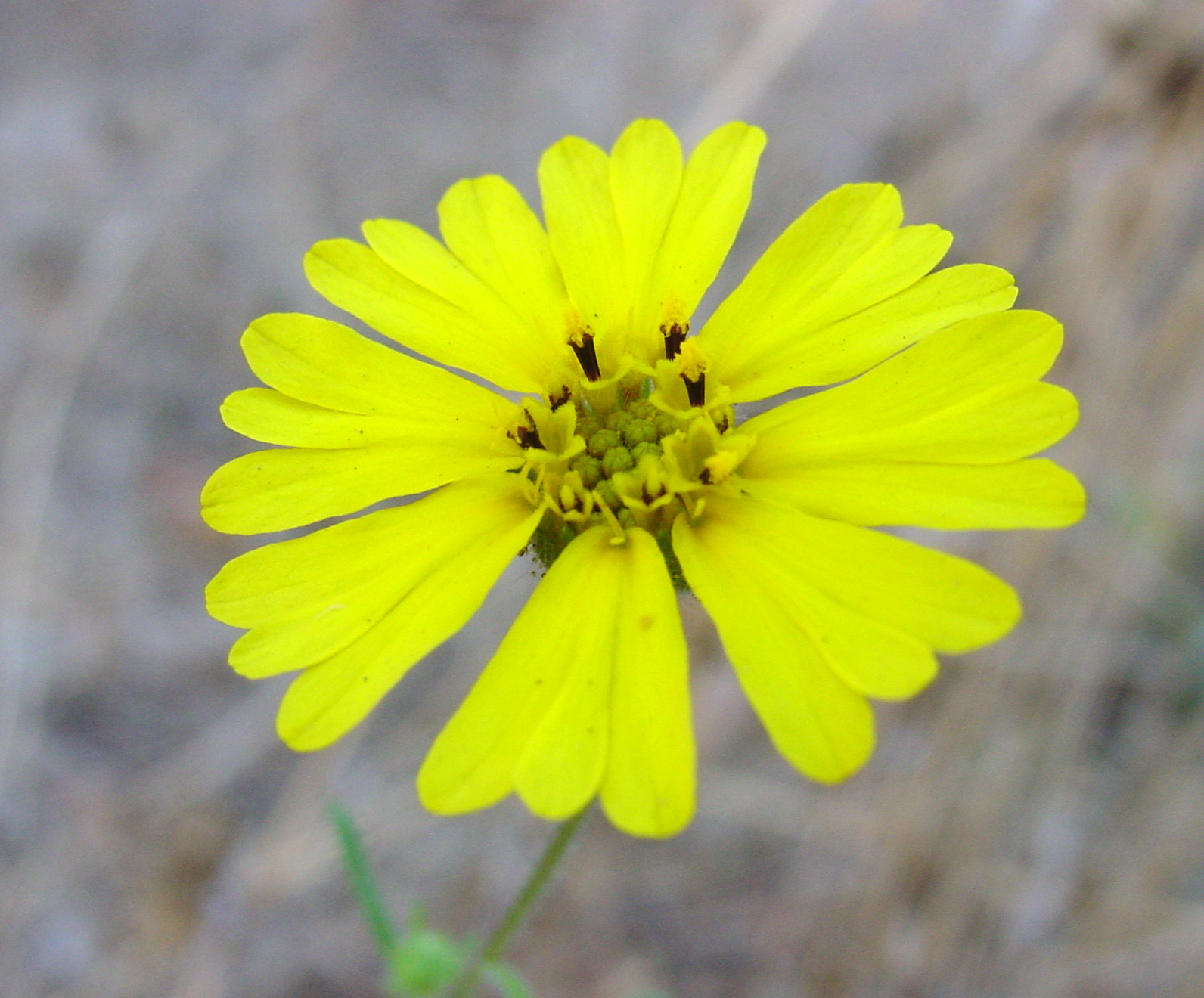
Flower head; Santa Monica Mountains, California

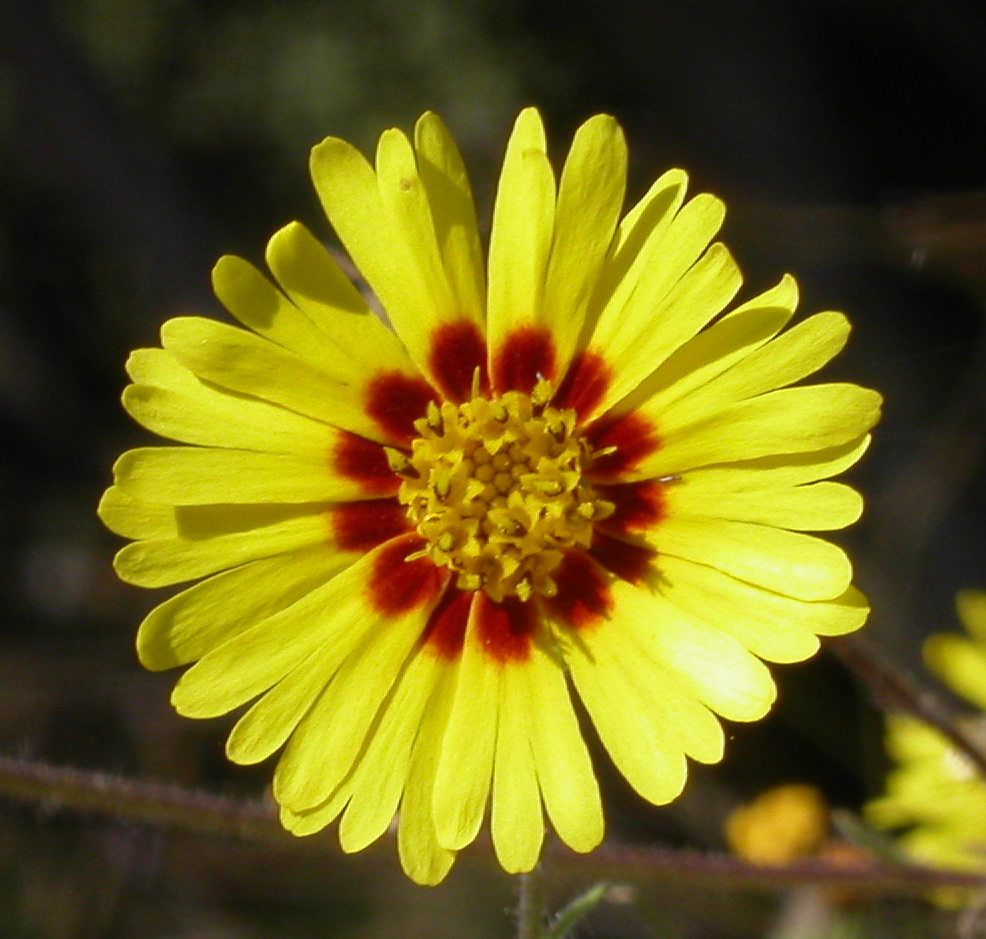
Flower head with maroon center; San Joaquin County, California

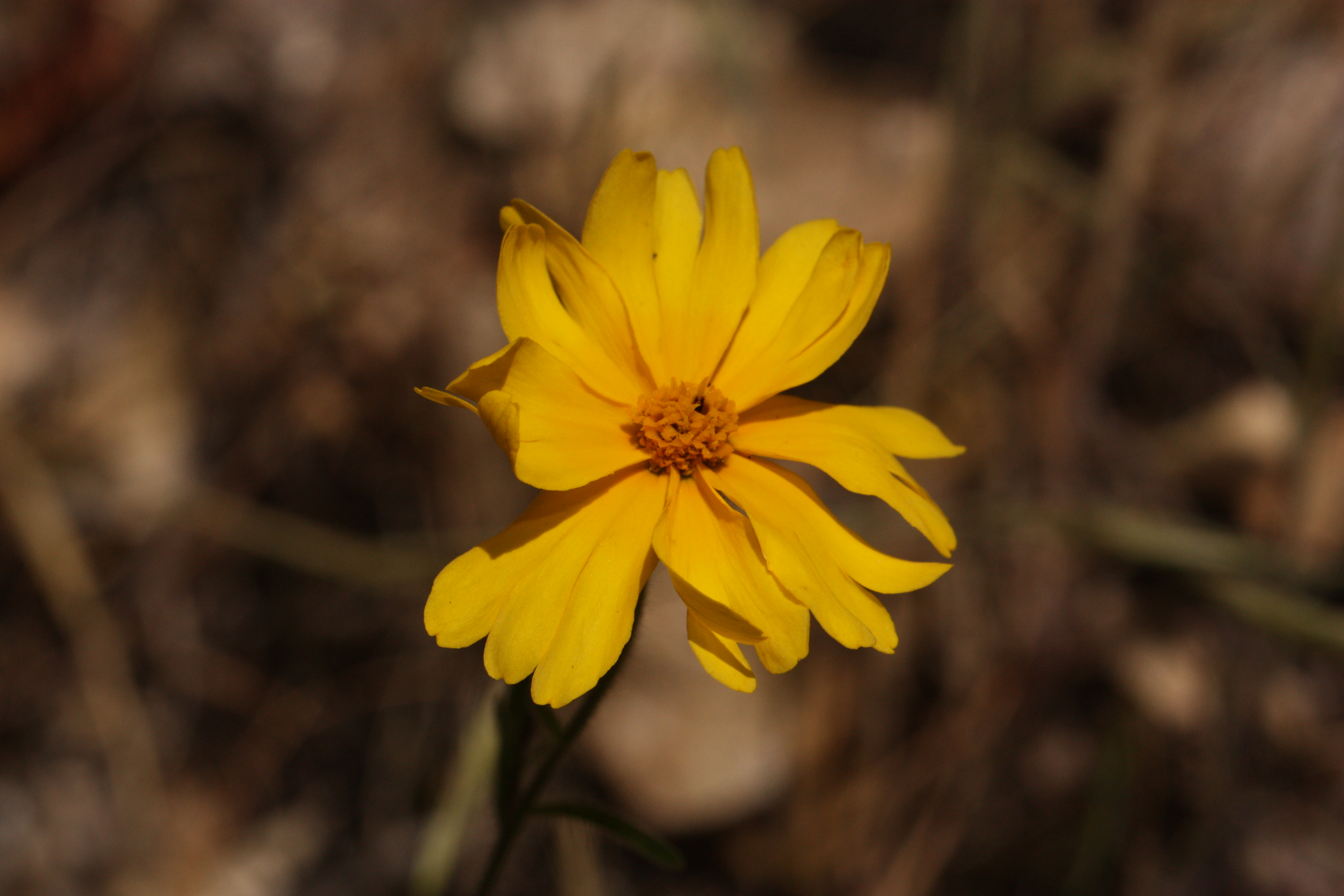
Flower head; Josephine County, Oregon

== Taxonomy ==
=== Subspecies ===
- Madia elegans densifolia - showy tarweed
- Madia elegans elegans - common madia
- Madia elegans vernalis - spring madia
- Madia elegans wheeleri - Wheeler's tarweed

=== Etymology ===
The foliage of species in the genus has sticky hairs, hence the common name tarweed.

== Distribution and habitat ==
The plant is native to western North America from south-central Washington state to northern Baja California. It may be found in dry open forest, disturbed areas and grasslands from low to high elevations.

== Uses ==
The achenes were historically used as food by Native Americans, including the Pomo and Miwok, who baked them or ground them into flour.
