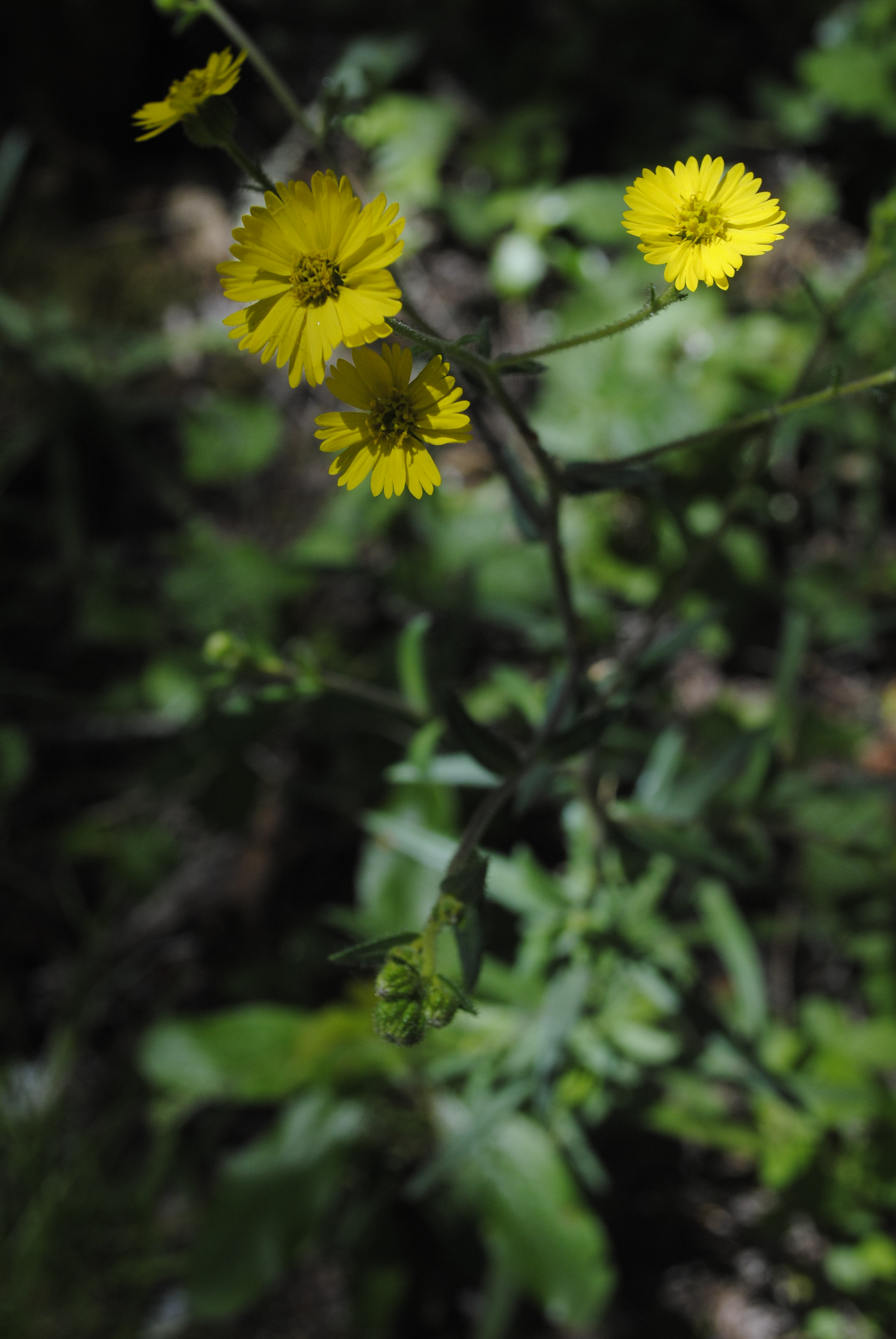
- Anisocarpus madioides

Scientific classification
- Kingdom: Plantae
- Clade: Embryophytes
- Clade: Tracheophytes
- Clade: Angiosperms
- Clade: Eudicots
- Clade: Asterids
- Order: Asterales
- Family: Asteraceae
- Subfamily: Asteroideae
- Tribe: Madieae
- Subtribe: Madiinae
- Genus: Anisocarpus; Nutt.

Type species
- Anisocarpus madioides Nutt.

Synonyms
- Raillardiopsis Rydb.

= Anisocarpus =

Genus of flowering plants

Anisocarpus is a genus of flowering plants in the tribe Madieae within the family Asteraceae.

Species

- Anisocarpus madioides Nutt. - California, Oregon, Washington, British Columbia.
- Anisocarpus scabridus (Eastw.) B.G.Baldwin - northern California.

Formerly Included

- Anisocarpus bolanderi A.Gray - Kyhosia bolanderi (A.Gray) B.G.Baldwin.
- Anisocarpus radiatus (Kellogg) Greene - Madia radiata Kellogg.
- Anisocarpus rammii (Greene) Greene - Jensia rammii (Greene) B.G.Baldwin.
- Anisocarpus yosemitanus (Parry ex A.Gray) Greene - Jensia yosemitana (Parry ex A.Gray) B.G.Baldwin.
