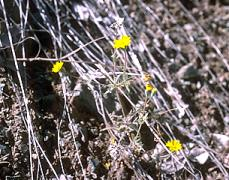
- Harmonia stebbinsii

Scientific classification
- Kingdom: Plantae
- Clade: Tracheophytes
- Clade: Angiosperms
- Clade: Eudicots
- Clade: Asterids
- Order: Asterales
- Family: Asteraceae
- Subfamily: Asteroideae
- Tribe: Madieae
- Subtribe: Madiinae
- Genus: Harmonia; B.G.Baldwin

Type species
- Madia hallii D.D.Keck

= Harmonia (plant) =

Genus of flowering plants

Harmonia is a genus of plants in the family Asteraceae. All 5 known species are endemic to the Coast Ranges of northern and central California. All but H. nutans grow on serpentine soils.

Harmonia is related to Madia, and both genera are commonly known as tarweeds. Harmonia is an annual shrub very often with bristles and sometimes with glandular hairs as well. Hears have a single series of phyllaries, subtending 3-8 fertile ray flowers plus 7-30 fertile yellow disc flowers.

Species

- Harmonia doris-nilesiae (T.W.Nelson & J.P.Nelson) B.G.Baldwin Klamath Mts.
- Harmonia guggolziorum B.G.Baldwin - Mendocino Co, California
- Harmonia hallii (D.D.Keck) B.G.Baldwin Coast Ranges of north-central California
- Harmonia nutans (Greene) B.G.Baldwin Coast Ranges near San Francisco Bay
- Harmonia stebbinsii (T.W.Nelson & J.P.Nelson) B.G.Baldwin Klamath Mts.
