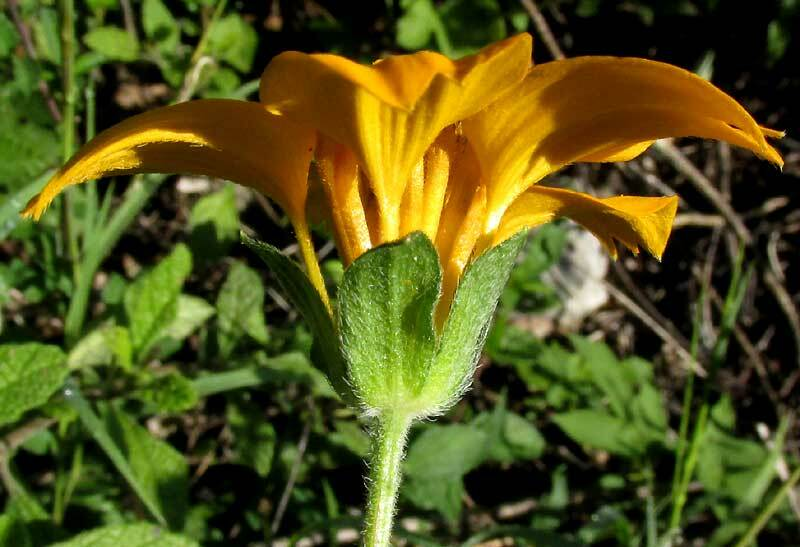
- Sclerocarpus divaricatus flowering head

Scientific classification
- Kingdom: Plantae
- Clade: Embryophytes
- Clade: Tracheophytes
- Clade: Spermatophytes
- Clade: Angiosperms
- Clade: Eudicots
- Clade: Asterids
- Order: Asterales
- Family: Asteraceae
- Tribe: Heliantheae
- Genus: Sclerocarpus
- Species: S. divaricatus

Binomial name
- Sclerocarpus divaricatus (Benth.) Benth. & Hook.f. ex Hemsl.

Synonyms
- Gymnopsis divaricata Benth. Sclerocarpus orcuttii Greenm. Sclerocarpus triunfonis M.E. Jones

= Sclerocarpus divaricatus =

Species of plant

Sclerocarpus divaricatus, sometimes called tropical bonebract, is an attractive species of the Neotropics belonging to the family Asteraceae

== Description ==
Sclerocarpus divaricatus is an erect, spreading herbaceous plant up to 1.5 m (5 ft) tall. Here are features helping to distinguish it from many other similar members of the family:

- Leaves with slender petioles reaching up to 9 centimetres (3.5 in) long may arise opposite one another at the base but otherwise alternate on the stems; blades are somewhat egg-shaped with toothed margins, and their rough-hairy surfaces are 3-nerved from near their bases.
- Flowering heads are solitary atop slender peduncles which are densely hairy at their tips and reach up to 6 cm (2.4 in) long.
- Each head consists of several yellow, sterile, petal-like ray florets along its margins, with an "eye" consisting of numerous fertile, yellow disk florets with dark anthers.
- Each disk-floret ovary is enfolded with a hairy bract, the "palea", which is slightly longer than the ovary, and which enlarges with the ovary and hardens with age.
- The ray florets' petal-like flat part, the ligule, is held well above the ovaries and subtending involucral bracts on a slender tube.
- Involucral bracts below the florets, numbering 4 or 5, form a green, bowl-like structure.
- One-seeded, more or less spherical, cypsela-type fruits enlarge to about 2 mm (0.08 in) across; they bear no pappuses atop them, but the enlarged, hairy paleae form crown-like items.

== Distribution ==
Sclerocarpus divaricatus is distributed from Mexico south through Central America into Colombia and Venezuela in South America.

== Habitat ==
Sclerocarpus divaricatus occurs in a wide variety of habitats from sea level up to 1,400 m (4,600 ft) in elevation, including mesophytic forests, pine-oak and oak forests, tropical forests with extended dry seasons, coastal dunes, mangroves, grasslands, savannas, forests beside water bodies and farmland.

== Ecology ==
In Mexico's Yucatan Peninsula, when a forest is destroyed and plants begin revegetating the soil, Sclerocarpus divaricatus has been listed among the ten first colonizing species to become established.

Also in the Yucatan Peninsula, Sclerocarpus divaricatus has been documented as one of six species identified as feed sources for bee colonies during the flowering onset period when flowers are scarce. In fact, in the Yucatan Peninsula the species may provide both flowers and fruits every month of the year.

== Human interactions ==
=== Traditional medicine ===
In Colombia, a decoction of the whole plant taken twice or more daily is used to treat malaria. In El Salvador, where it is known as Calacate, it has been used to bring down fevers. In the Sierra de Chiconquiaco, Veracrúz, México, Sclerocarpus divaricatus is used to treat diarrhea.

=== Apiculture ===
In Mexico's Yucatan Peninsula where apiculture long has been practiced by the Mayan people, Sclerocarpus divaricatus is seen as important for bees.

== Taxonomy ==
In 1845, when George Bentham formally described Sclerocarpus divaricatus with the basionym of Gymnopsis divariata, he erected a new genus for it, Gymnopsis. He found the taxon so unusual because of the "... remarkable manner in which the fertile achænia of the disk are enclosed in the paleæ of the receptacle... " The specimen had been collected during the voyage of H.M.S. Sulphur in the Gulf of Fonseca, on the coast of the Pacific Ocean in Central America.

It might be noticed that the publication date for Bentham's work is given as 1845, while the document itself states the date as MDCCCXLIV, which is 1844. This may be explained because the work was published in six separate parts over several years, and the part dealing with the new taxon, the third, entitled "Western Tropical America," was published in 1845; The document date of MDCCCXLIV apparently applies only to the first part.

=== Etymology ===
The genus name Sclerocarpus is based on the Greek skleros, meaning "hard", and karpos, alluding to the hardened paleae enfolding the cypselae.

The species name divaricatus is New Latin, the past participle of divaricare, meaning "to spread apart". It's likely that when Bentham named and described the taxon he was referring to the plant's spreading growth form. In his Latin description for the species, his first words were "... herbae, divaricato-ramosa..." meaning "herbs, divaricate-branched", with the word "divaricate" often used as an adjective in botany to describe a branch coming off the stem almost at a right angle.

== Gallery ==
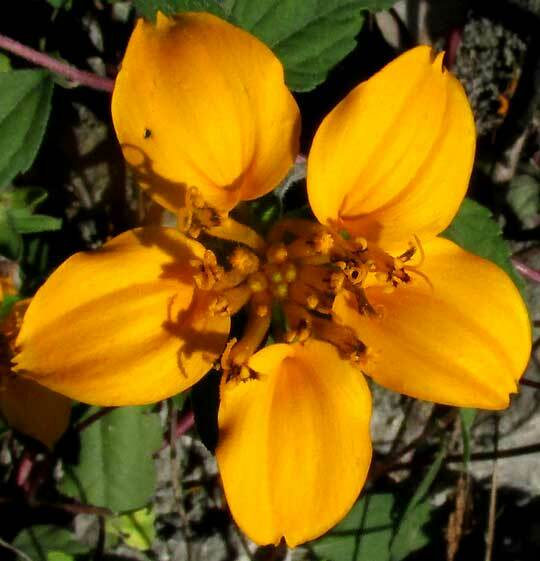
Sclerocarpus divaricatus flowering head from above

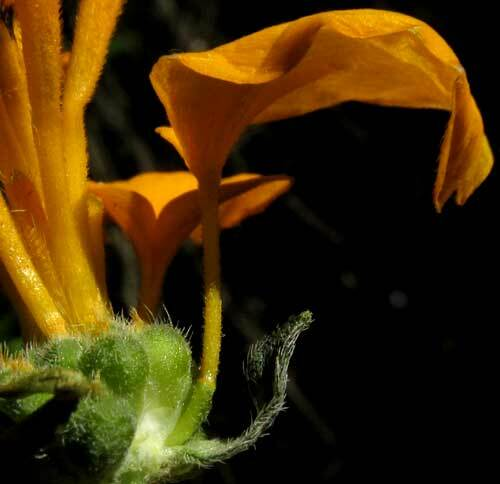
Sclerocarpus divaricatus petal-like disk ray floret

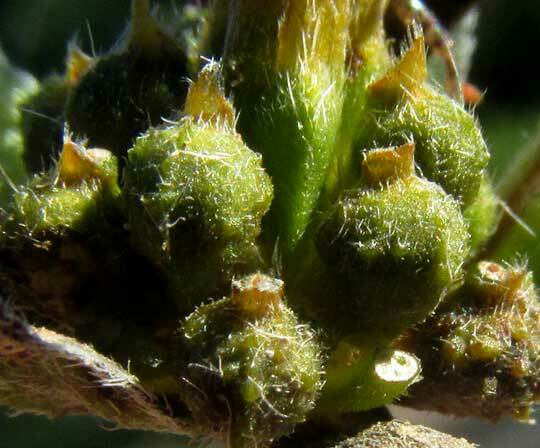
Sclerocarpus divaricatus cypselae enfolded with hairy paleae

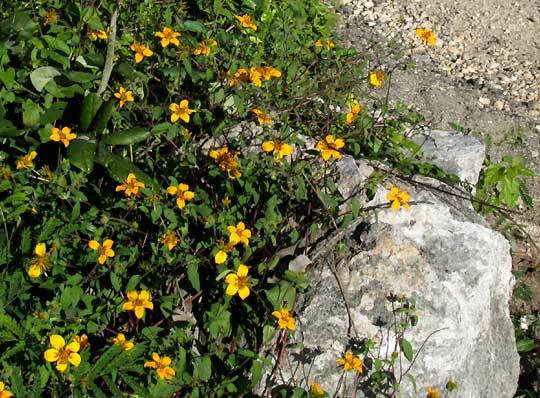
Sclerocarpus divaricatus in roadside habitat
