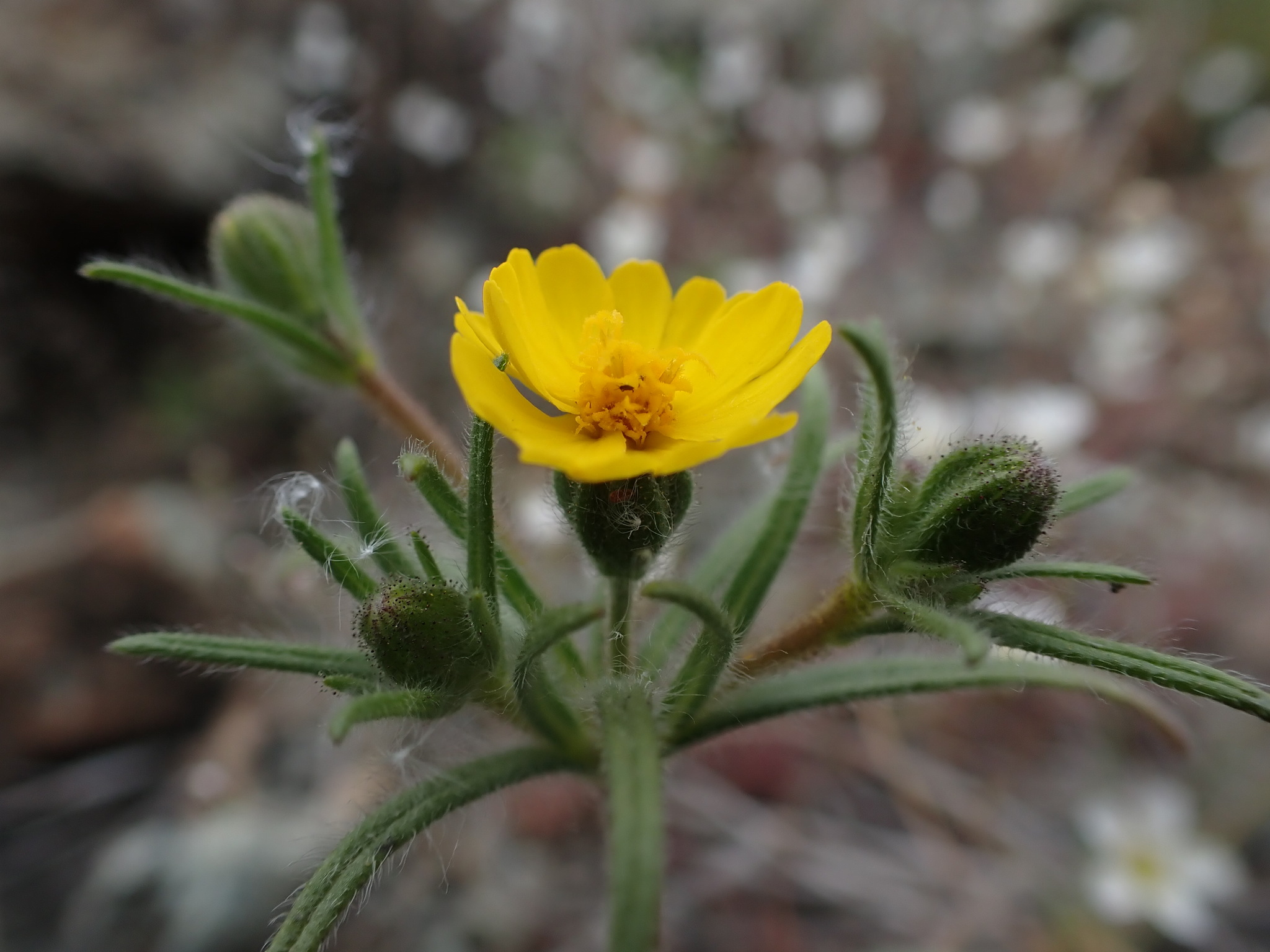

Conservation status
- Critically Imperiled (NatureServe)

Scientific classification
- Kingdom: Plantae
- Clade: Embryophytes
- Clade: Tracheophytes
- Clade: Spermatophytes
- Clade: Angiosperms
- Clade: Eudicots
- Clade: Asterids
- Order: Asterales
- Family: Asteraceae
- Genus: Harmonia
- Species: H. guggolziorum

Binomial name
- Harmonia guggolziorum B.G.Baldwin

= Harmonia guggolziorum =

Species of flowering plant

Harmonia guggolziorum is a rare California plant species of plant in the tribe Madieae within the family Asteraceae. It is known by the common names Guggolz tarplant and Guggolzes' harmonia. It is endemic to Mendocino County, California, where it is known from two occurrences near Hopland. It is a member of the serpentine soils flora and grows in chaparral habitat. It was only discovered in 2000 and described to science in 2001.

The plant was named for Jack and Betty Guggolz, the California plant enthusiasts who collected the type specimen in 2000.

This rare plant is an annual herb producing an erect stem up to 30 centimeters tall, branching in the upper part. The leaves are mostly located around the central part of the stem and near the bases of the upper branches. The leaves are linear and coated in rough hairs and large resin glands. The inflorescence is a single flower head or a loose cluster of heads each with 3 to 6 yellow ray florets measuring about half a centimeter long.

The plant may be naturally rare, having evolved on its specific ultramafic soil type and never having spread beyond.
