= Carlquistia =

Conservation status
- Imperiled (NatureServe)

Scientific classification
- Kingdom: Plantae
- Clade: Tracheophytes
- Clade: Angiosperms
- Clade: Eudicots
- Clade: Asterids
- Order: Asterales
- Family: Asteraceae
- Subfamily: Asteroideae
- Tribe: Madieae
- Subtribe: Madiinae
- Genus: Carlquistia; B.G.Baldw.
- Species: C. muirii

Binomial name
- Carlquistia muirii (A.Gray) B.G.Baldw.

Synonyms
- Raillardella muirii A.Gray; Raillardiopsis muirii (A.Gray) Rydb.

Genus of flowering plants

Carlquistia is a rare North American genus of flowering plants in the family Asteraceae containing the single species Carlquistia muirii. Formerly named Raillardiopsis muirii, the plant was reexamined in the 1990s and moved to a new genus of its own, separate from similar and closely related genera, such as Madia. Common names for the species include Muir's tarplant, Muir's raillardiopsis, and Muir's raillardella.

This plant is related to the silversword alliance of Hawaiian plants.

The genus was named for the American botanist Sherwin Carlquist (1930–2021). The specific epithet "muirii" honors Scottish-American naturalist, John Muir (1838–1914).

== Description ==
Carlquistia muirii is a rhizomatous perennial herb forming clumps or mats of stems with hairy green pointed leaves up to about 4 centimeters long. Leaves are arranged oppositely on the lower stem, and alternately higher up. The inflorescence is usually made up of a solitary glandular flower head on an erect stalk. The head contains many yellow disc florets but no ray florets. The fruit is a very narrow achene which may exceed one centimeter in length including its pappus of plumelike bristles.

== Distribution ==
Carlquistia muirii is endemic to California. It has a discontinuous distribution, occurring in the southern Sierra Nevada (Fresno, Tulare, and Kern Counties) and on the other western side of the San Joaquin Valley around the Ventana Double Cone in the Santa Lucia Mountains of Monterey County.
