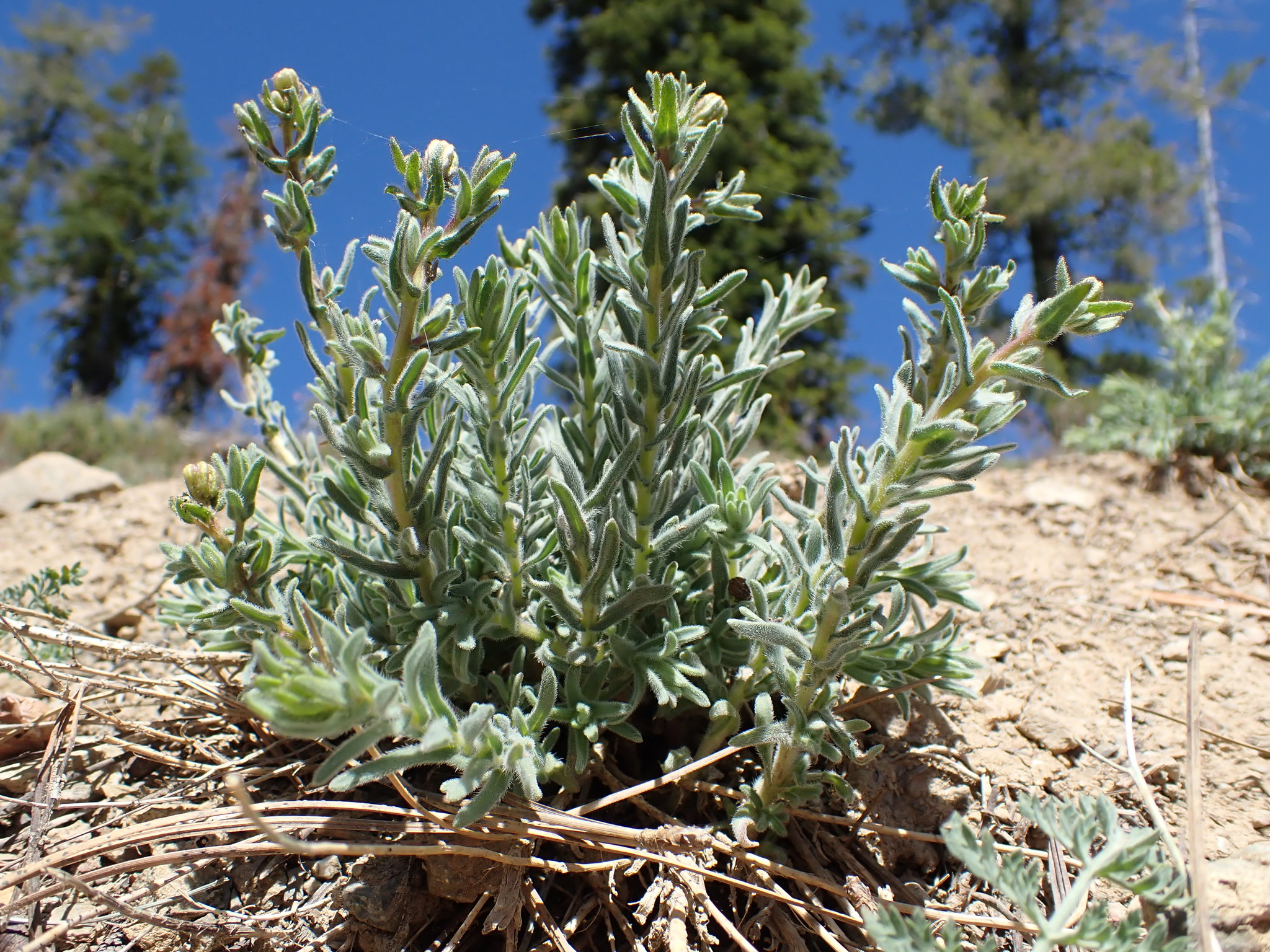
- Anisocarpus scabridus (Eastw.) B.G.Baldwin

Conservation status
- Vulnerable (NatureServe)

Scientific classification
- Kingdom: Plantae
- Clade: Tracheophytes
- Clade: Angiosperms
- Clade: Eudicots
- Clade: Asterids
- Order: Asterales
- Family: Asteraceae
- Genus: Anisocarpus
- Species: A. scabridus

Binomial name
- Anisocarpus scabridus (Eastw.) B.G.Baldwin

Synonyms
- Raillardella scabrida Eastw.; Raillardiopsis scabrida (Eastw.) Rydb.

= Anisocarpus scabridus =

Species of flowering plant

Anisocarpus scabridus, the leafy raillardiopsis, is a North American species of flowering plants in the family Asteraceae.

== Distribution ==
It is found only in northwestern California, primarily in scree slopes at relatively high elevations in the Coast Ranges of Humboldt, Mendocino, Trinity, Lake, Tehama, and Colusa Counties. There are also a few isolated populations in the southern Cascades of northern Shasta County.

== Description ==
Anisocarpus scabridus is a small plant rarely more than 2 inches (5 cm) high. It has blue-green leaves and flower heads containing both ray florets and disc florets.

The plant is quite different in ecology and appearance from the only other species in the genus, A. madioides. The two were classified in different genera for many years until molecular and anatomical studies in the 1990s demonstrated their close relationship.
