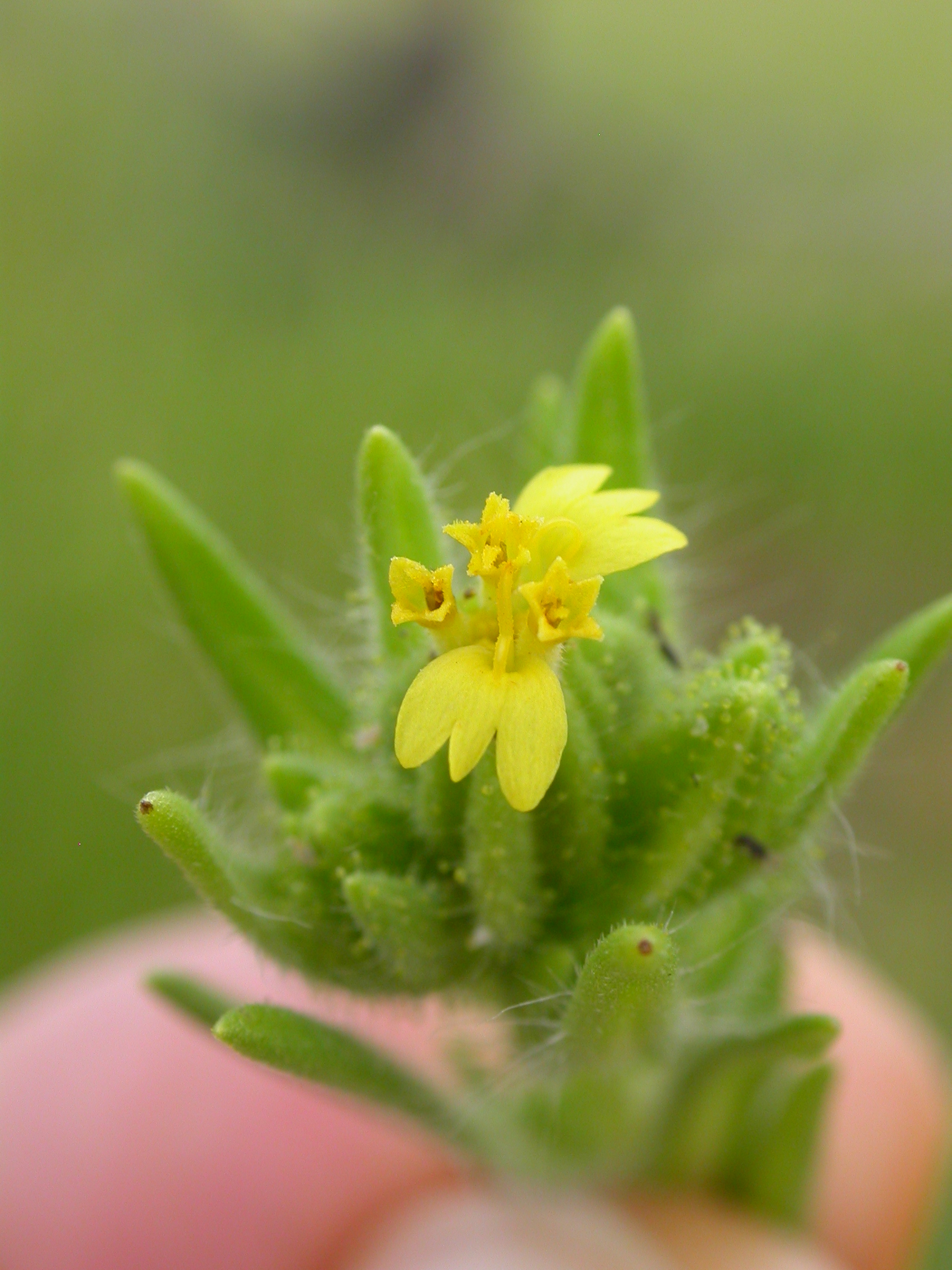

Conservation status
- Secure (NatureServe)

Scientific classification
- Kingdom: Plantae
- Clade: Tracheophytes
- Clade: Angiosperms
- Clade: Eudicots
- Clade: Asterids
- Order: Asterales
- Family: Asteraceae
- Genus: Madia
- Species: M. glomerata

Binomial name
- Madia glomerata Hook.

= Madia glomerata =

Species of flowering plant

Madia glomerata is a species of flowering plant in the family Asteraceae known by the common name mountain tarweed.

== Description ==
Madia glomerata grows in a wide variety of habitat types, including disturbed areas such as roadsides. It is an annual herb sometimes exceeding a meter in height, its stem branched or not and covered in foliage. It is hairy to bristly in texture, studded with stalked yellow resin glands, and strongly aromatic with an unpleasant scent. The rough-haired leaves are up to 10 centimeters long. The inflorescence is generally a cluster of glandular flower heads with black-tipped yellow disc florets and sometimes one or more tiny greenish or purplish yellow ray florets. The fruit is a flat black achene with no pappus.

== Distribution and habitat ==
Madia glomerata is the most widely distributed Madia, its native range covering much of western and northern North America from Alaska to the Southwestern United States, most of southern Canada and into the Great Lakes region. It grows in sagebrush plains and mountains.
