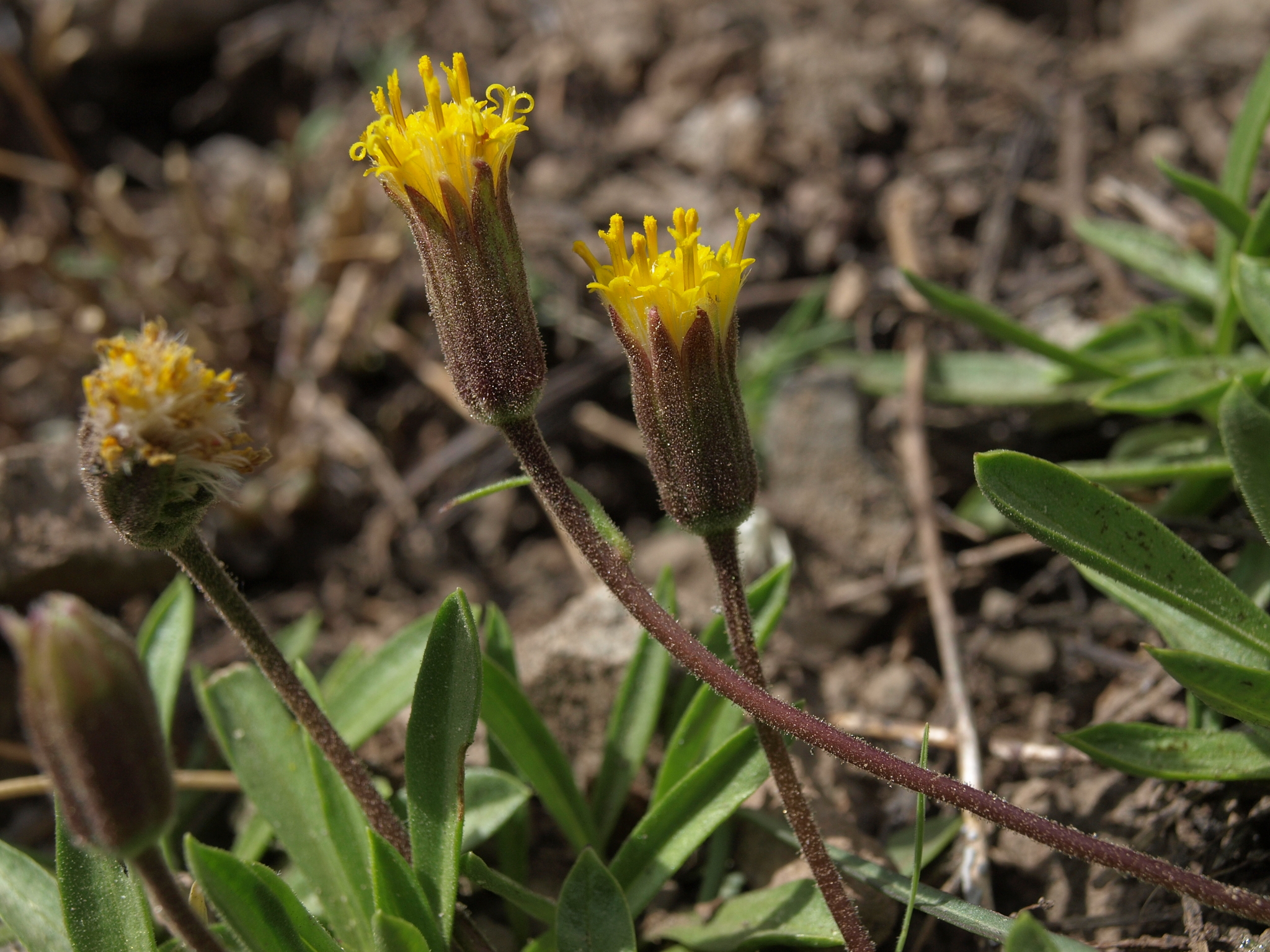

Scientific classification
- Kingdom: Plantae
- Clade: Tracheophytes
- Clade: Angiosperms
- Clade: Eudicots
- Clade: Asterids
- Order: Asterales
- Family: Asteraceae
- Genus: Raillardella
- Species: R. scaposa

Binomial name
- Raillardella scaposa (A.Gray) A.Gray

= Raillardella scaposa =

Species of plant

Raillardella scaposa is a species of flowering plant in the family Asteraceae known by the common name stem raillardella. It is native to the Sierra Nevada of California and western Nevada and parts of the southern Cascade Range in Oregon, where it grows in varying habitat types, from wet to dry and exposed to shaded. It is a rhizomatous perennial herb growing in a clump of rosetted basal leaves. The leaves are linear to lance-shaped, up to 16 centimeters long, and glandular. The plant produces an inflorescence just a few centimeters to half a meter tall consisting of flower heads which are cylindrical to hemispheric in shape. Each head contains many yellow to orange disc florets and sometimes a few ray florets. The fruit is a long, narrow achene 1 to 2 centimeters in length including its pappus of plumelike bristles.
