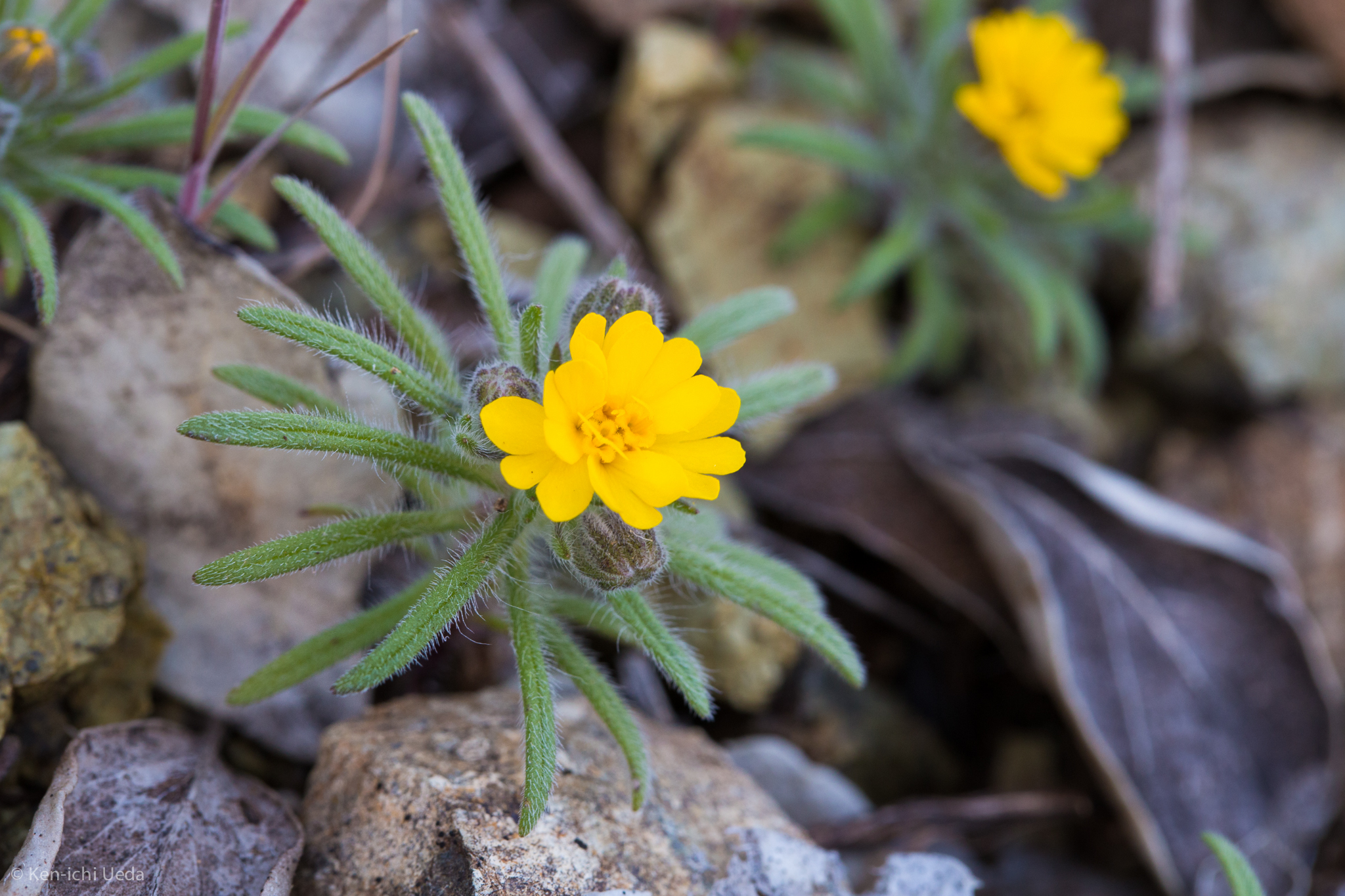

Scientific classification
- Kingdom: Plantae
- Clade: Tracheophytes
- Clade: Angiosperms
- Clade: Eudicots
- Clade: Asterids
- Order: Asterales
- Family: Asteraceae
- Genus: Harmonia
- Species: H. hallii

Binomial name
- Harmonia hallii (D.D.Keck) B.G.Baldwin

Synonyms
- Madia hallii D.D.Keck

= Harmonia hallii =

Species of flowering plant

Harmonia hallii (formerly Madia hallii) is a species of flowering plant in the family Asteraceae known by the common names Hall's harmonia and Hall's madia.

== Description ==
Harmonia hallii is an annual herb growing up to about 18 centimeters in maximum height, its stiff, leafy stem branching or not. It is coated in rough hairs, dark-colored stalked resin glands, and bristles. Most of the densely hairy leaves are clustered around the base of the plant.

The glandular inflorescence bears one or more flower heads with yellow ray florets up to half a centimeter long and sometimes tinged with red at the bases. The disc florets at the center are yellow. The fruit is a club-shaped achene about 3 millimeter long with a small pappus.

== Distribution ==
Harmonia hallii is endemic to California, where it is known only from a small section of the North Coast Ranges. It has been reported only from Yolo, Lake, Colusa, and Napa Counties. It grows in chaparral on serpentine soils, and its habitat is limited and being lost to activities such as mining.
