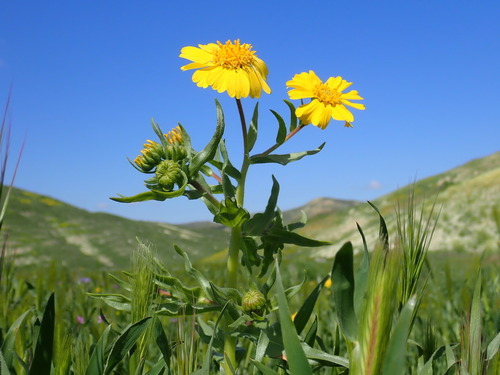

Conservation status
- Vulnerable (NatureServe)

Scientific classification
- Kingdom: Plantae
- Clade: Tracheophytes
- Clade: Angiosperms
- Clade: Eudicots
- Clade: Asterids
- Order: Asterales
- Family: Asteraceae
- Genus: Madia
- Species: M. radiata

Binomial name
- Madia radiata Kellogg

Synonyms
- Anisocarpus radiatus Greene

= Madia radiata =

Species of flowering plant

Madia radiata is a species of flowering plant in the family Asteraceae known by the common names golden madia and showy madia. It is endemic to California, where it is known mostly from the Central Coast Ranges and adjacent edges of the San Francisco Bay Area and Central Valley.

== Description ==
Madia radiata is an annual herb growing upright 10 to 90 centimeters tall, the stem often branching and coated in bulbous resin glands. The bristly, glandular leaves are up to 10 centimeters long, often wider at the top of the plant than below. The inflorescence produces flower heads lined with hairy, gland-studded phyllaries. The head has golden yellow ray florets up to almost 2 centimeters long and a center filled with many disc florets. The fruit is a black cypselae a few millimeters long with no pappus.

== Distribution ==
The Madia radiata current distribution and status is uncertain; most of the known occurrences were observed decades ago and have not been confirmed since, and many have likely been extirpated.
