= Harmonia doris-nilesiae =

Scientific classification
- Kingdom: Plantae
- Clade: Tracheophytes
- Clade: Angiosperms
- Clade: Eudicots
- Clade: Asterids
- Order: Asterales
- Family: Asteraceae
- Genus: Harmonia
- Species: H. doris-nilesiae

Binomial name
- Harmonia doris-nilesiae (T.W.Nelson & J.P.Nelson) B.G.Baldwin

Synonyms
- Madia doris-nilesiae T.W.Nelson & J.P.Nelson

Species of flowering plant

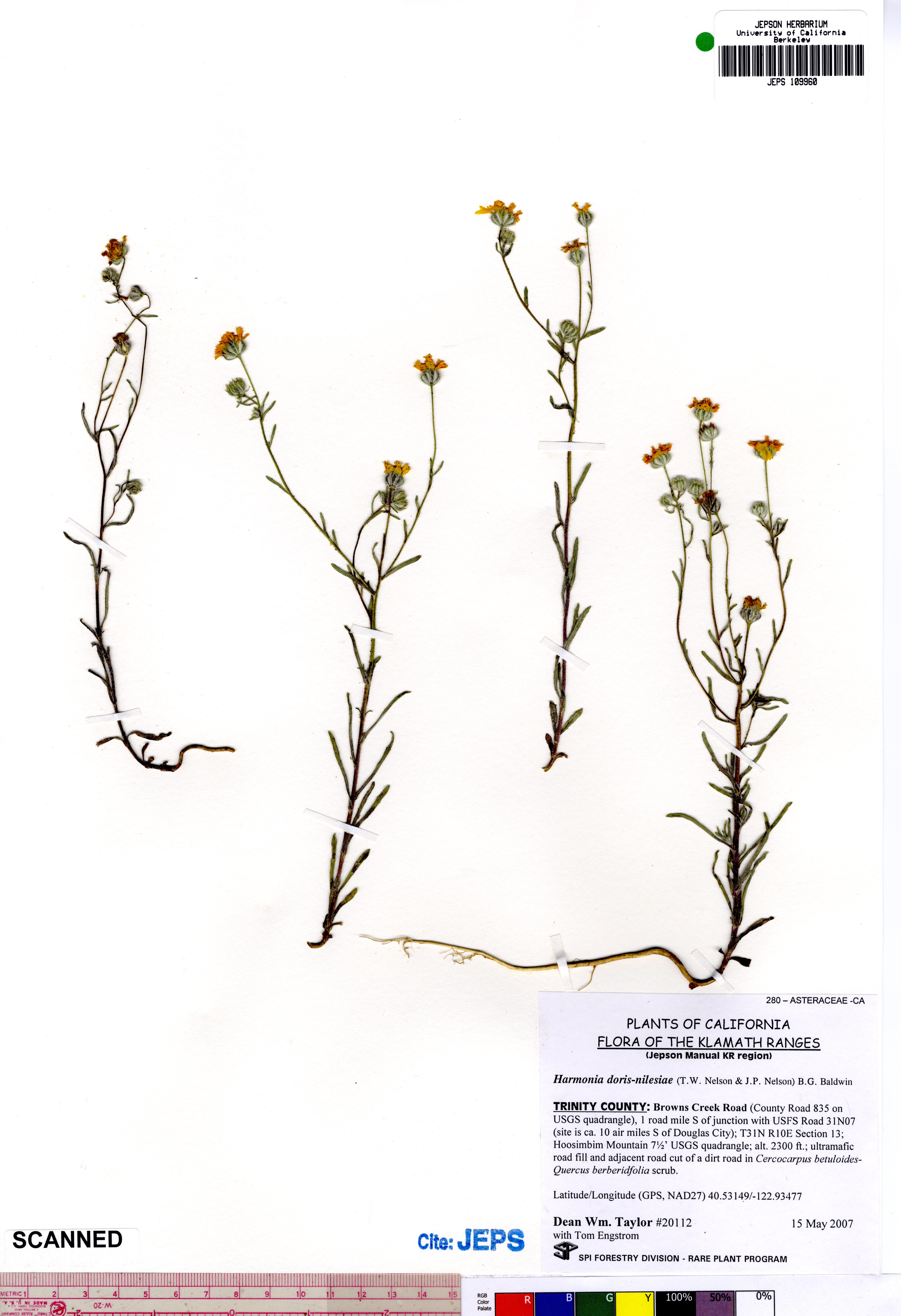

Harmonia doris-nilesiae is a species of flowering plant in the family Asteraceae known by the common names serpentine tarweed and Niles' madia.

This plant was first described in science in 1985, when it was named Madia doris-nilesiae after the California botanist and teacher Doris Niles. It and several others were moved to the new genus Harmonia in 1999.

== Description ==
Harmonia doris-nilesiae is an annual herb growing up to about 26 centimetres tall; its upper branches are bristly and glandular. The bristly, toothed leaves are up to 4 centimetres long.

The inflorescence bears several flower heads on long, thin peduncles. Each head has yellow disc florets tipped with yellow anthers and 4 to 8 bright yellow ray florets, each a few millimeters long. The fruit is a black achene with a small pappus.

== Distribution ==
Harmonia doris-nilesiae is endemic to the southern Klamath Mountains of far northern California, where it grows in serpentine soils.
