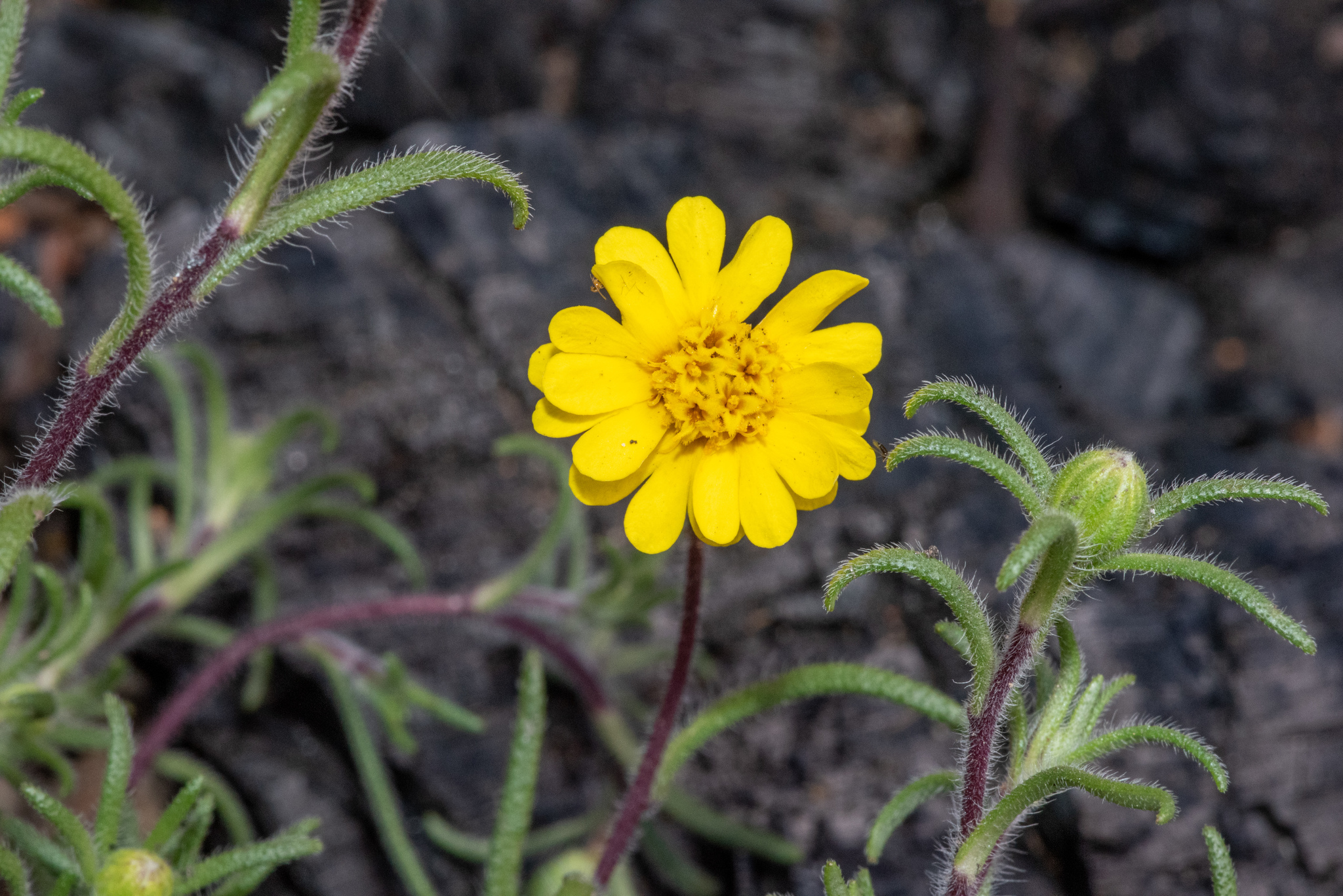

Scientific classification
- Kingdom: Plantae
- Clade: Tracheophytes
- Clade: Angiosperms
- Clade: Eudicots
- Clade: Asterids
- Order: Asterales
- Family: Asteraceae
- Genus: Harmonia
- Species: H. nutans

Binomial name
- Harmonia nutans (Greene) B.G.Baldwin

Synonyms
- Madia nutans Greene

= Harmonia nutans =

Species of flowering plant

Harmonia nutans (syn. Madia nutans) is a species of flowering plant in the family Asteraceae known by the common name nodding madia.

== Description ==
Harmonia nutans is an annual herb producing a bristly, glandular stem up to about 25 centimeters tall. The inflorescence produces one or more flower heads which bend and nod as they bloom and especially as the fruit develops. The head has yellow ray florets several millimeters long, lobed at the tips and sometimes red-tinged near the bases, and yellow disc florets. The fruit is an achene a few millimeters long; those developing from the disc florets are tipped with pappi.

== Distribution ==
Harmonia nutans is endemic to California, where it is limited to the Coast Ranges in the San Francisco Bay Area and slopes to the north. It is reported only from Solano, Napa, Lake and Sonoma Counties. It grows in common mountain habitat such as chaparral and woodland, often on volcanic soils.
