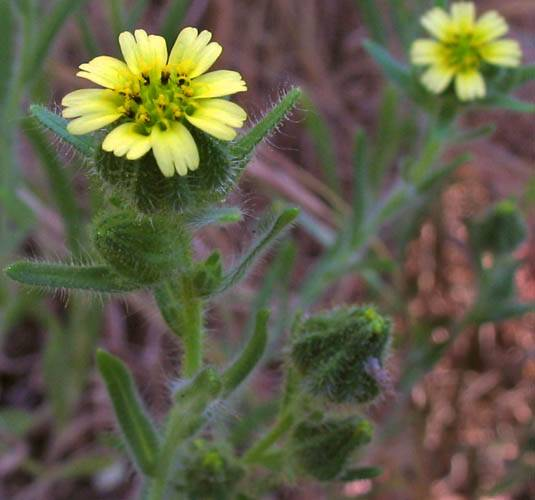

Conservation status
- Secure (NatureServe)

Scientific classification
- Kingdom: Plantae
- Clade: Tracheophytes
- Clade: Angiosperms
- Clade: Eudicots
- Clade: Asterids
- Order: Asterales
- Family: Asteraceae
- Genus: Madia
- Species: M. gracilis

Binomial name
- Madia gracilis (Sm.) D.D.Keck & J.C.Clausen ex Applegate

Synonyms
- Sclerocarpus gracilis Sm.; Madia dissitiflora Torr. & A.Gray; Madia gracilis subsp. collina D.D.Keck; Madia gracilis subsp. pilosa D.D.Keck; Madia sativa var. dissitiflora (Nutt.) A.Gray; Madia sativa subsp. dissitiflora D.D.Keck; Madorella dissitiflora Nutt.

= Madia gracilis =

Species of flowering plant

Madia gracilis is a species of flowering plant in the family Asteraceae known by the common names grassy tarweed, slender tarweed, and gumweed madia.

== Description ==
Madia gracilis is vstem is branching, and hairy and glandular in texture. The leaves are up to 10 centimeters long and covered in soft hairs and stalked resin glands.

The inflorescence is an array of clusters of flower heads. Each head is lined with phyllaries that are coated densely with stalked knobby resin glands. It bears yellow, lobe-tipped ray florets a few millimeters long and several black-anthered disc florets.

The fruit is a flat, hairless achene with no pappus.

== Distribution and habitat ==
The annual herb is native to western North America: from British Columbia, through California to Baja California; and east to Utah and Montana. It grows in many habitat types except for arid desert areas, including oak woodlands and mixed evergreen forests.

== Uses ==
The seeds were used to make pinole by the indigenous Mendocino, Miwok, and Pomo peoples of California.
