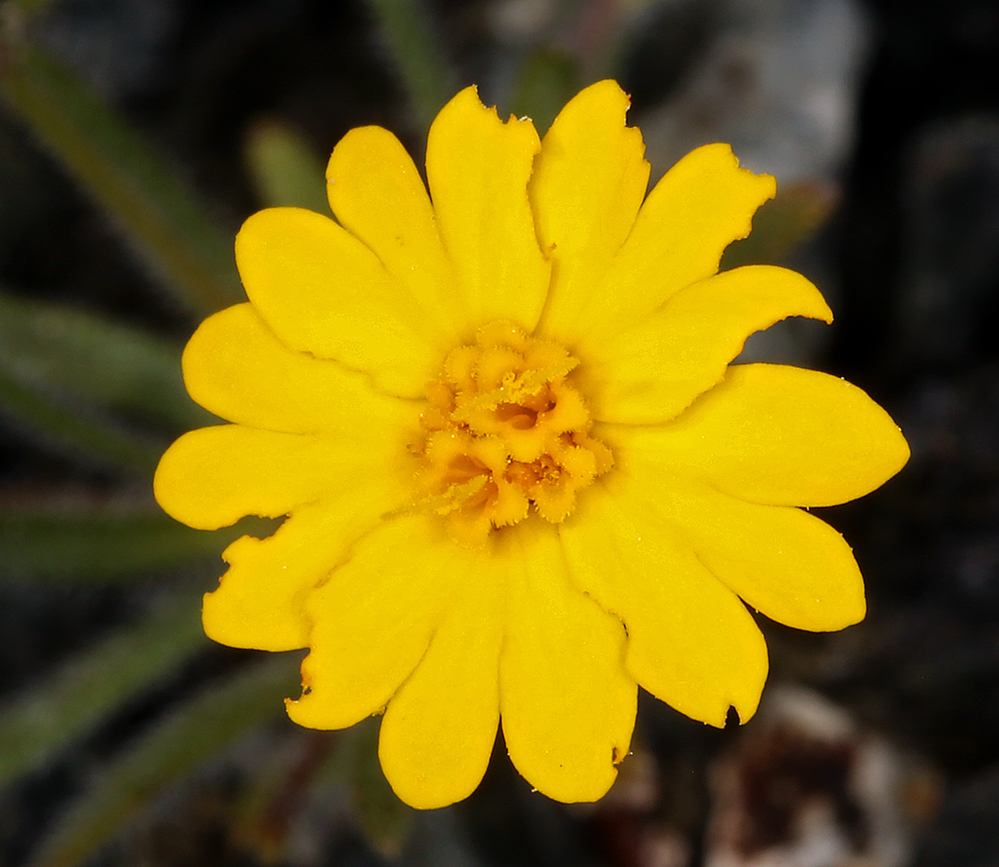

Scientific classification
- Kingdom: Plantae
- Clade: Tracheophytes
- Clade: Angiosperms
- Clade: Eudicots
- Clade: Asterids
- Order: Asterales
- Family: Asteraceae
- Genus: Harmonia
- Species: H. stebbinsii

Binomial name
- Harmonia stebbinsii (T.W.Nelson & J.P.Nelson) B.G.Baldwin

Synonyms
- Madia stebbinsii

= Harmonia stebbinsii =

Species of flowering plant

Harmonia stebbinsii (syn. Madia stebbinsii) is a species of flowering plant in the family Asteraceae known by the common name Stebbins' tarweed, or Stebbins' madia. It is endemic to northern California, where it is limited to the Klamath Mountains and adjacent slopes of the North Coast Ranges. It is a member of the serpentine soils plant community in these mountains, found at elevations of 1100–1600 meters. It is a rare annual herb producing a bristly stem up to about 25 centimeters tall studded with black resin glands. Its bristly leaves grow up to about 2 centimeters long and are mostly gathered near the base of the plant. The inflorescence is an array of flower heads lined with hairy, glandular, purple-tipped phyllaries. The head has a few yellow ray florets several millimeters long and yellow disc florets. The fruit is an achene tipped with a pappus.

== Distribution ==
This representative of the tarweed group is an endangered endemic to California, and characteristically associated with shallow, rocky, serpentine soils. It was formerly considered by the California Native Plant Society to be a species of special concern, based on rare plant surveys conducted by US Forest Service botanists over the past 25 years. However, the plant has most recently been placed on the California Rare Plant Rank 1B.2. It is only found in the narrow geographical range of Lake, Shasta, Tehama, and Trinity counties of California's Klamath Mountain Ecoregion. Occurrences outside of this range have not been documented.

== Ecology ==
Ultramafic, "serpentine" soils in California support a high rate of endemism in plant communities. Plate tectonics and erosion over time work to produce these unique soil environments that are characterized by high levels of magnesium and iron silicate materials. In addition, they feature low levels of important plant nutrients, including nitrogen, phosphorus, potassium, and calcium. In addition, these soils contain trace minerals that are toxic to most plants, including cobalt, chromium, and nickel. California contains approximately 2300 square miles of ultramafic rocks. Thus, plants found in these environments have the adaptive ability to grow, despite these conditions. Furthermore, such an extreme environment facilitates the high rate of endemism found, as few species are able to dominate a serpentine plant community. Of all of the endemic California plants, those of the family Asteraceae have the highest affinity for serpentine soils, based on the number of species represented in these serpentine plant communities. Most serpentine endemism is concentrated in the North Coastal and Klamath Mountain Ranges of northwestern California and southwestern Oregon.
