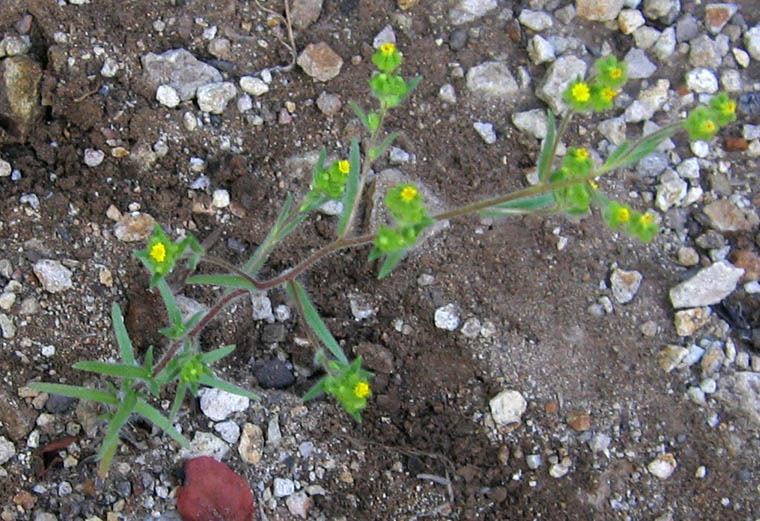

Conservation status
- Secure (NatureServe)

Scientific classification
- Kingdom: Plantae
- Clade: Tracheophytes
- Clade: Angiosperms
- Clade: Eudicots
- Clade: Asterids
- Order: Asterales
- Family: Asteraceae
- Genus: Madia
- Species: M. exigua

Binomial name
- Madia exigua (Sm.) A.Gray

Synonyms
- Harpaecarpus exiguus (Sm.) A.Gray; Sclerocarpus exiguus Sm.; Harpaecarpus exiguus var. macrocephalus Suksd.; Harpaecarpus madarioides Nutt.; Madia exigua subsp. macrocephala (Suksd.) Piper; Madia filipes A.Gray; Madia filipes var. macrocephala Suksd.

= Madia exigua =

Species of flowering plant

Madia exigua is a species of flowering plant in the family Asteraceae known by the common names small tarweed and threadstem madia.

== Range ==
Madia exigua is native to western North America from British Columbia to Baja California, where it grows in many types of dry habitat outside the deserts.

== Description ==
Madia exigua is an aromatic annual herb growing up to 50 cm (20 in) tall its slender stem coated with hairs, large stalked resin glands, and sometimes bristles. The rough-haired leaves are up to 4 cm (1.6 in) long.

The inflorescence is an array of clustered flower heads on thin, stiff peduncles. Each head has an involucre of phyllaries shaped like a top. The phyllaries are coated in knobby yellow resin glands. At the tip of the inflorescence are minute yellowish ray florets each under a millimeter long, and one or two yellow disc florets. The fruit is an achene with no pappus.
