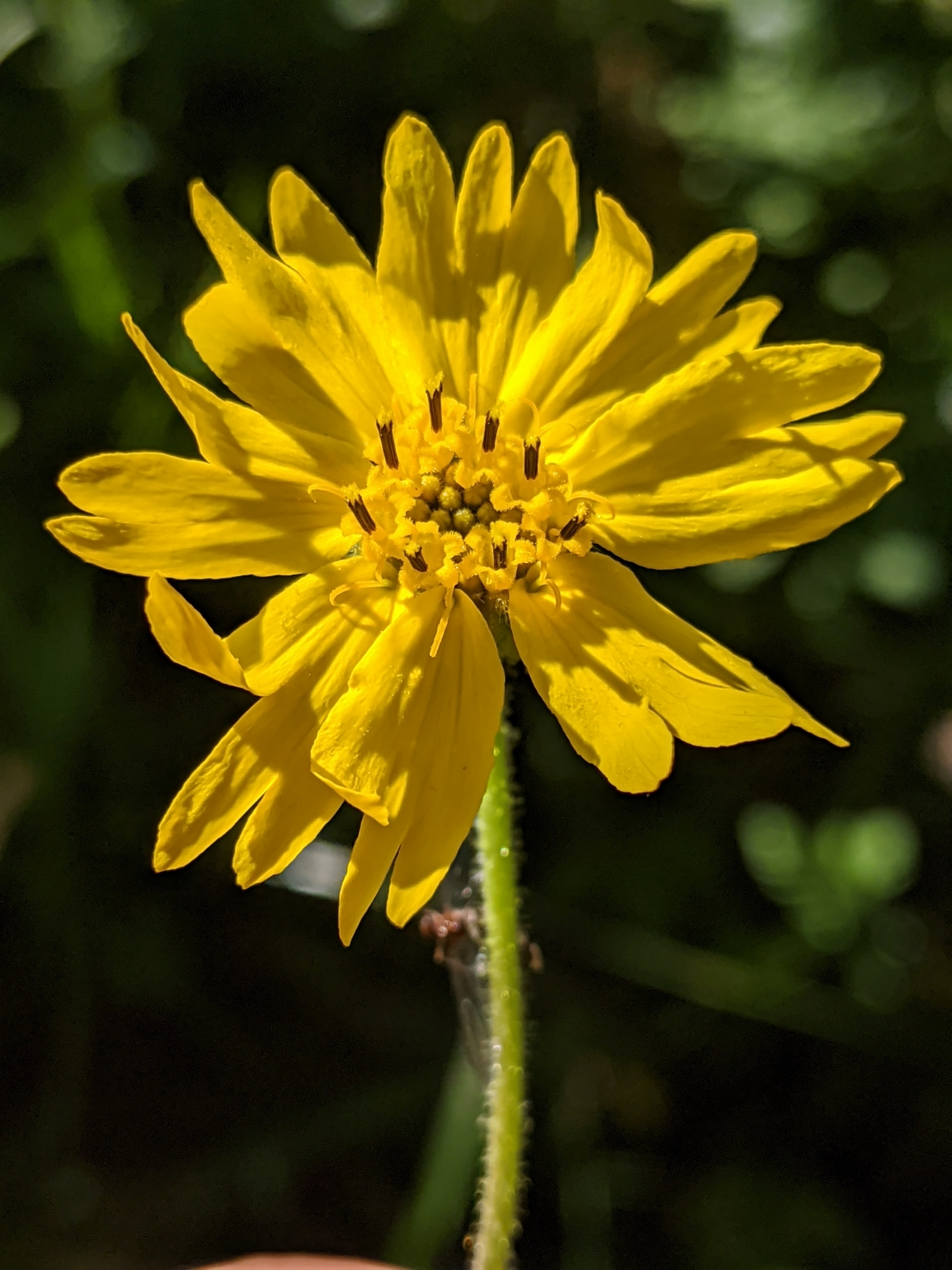

Scientific classification
- Kingdom: Plantae
- Clade: Tracheophytes
- Clade: Angiosperms
- Clade: Eudicots
- Clade: Asterids
- Order: Asterales
- Family: Asteraceae
- Subfamily: Asteroideae
- Tribe: Madieae
- Subtribe: Madiinae
- Genus: Kyhosia; B.G.Baldwin
- Species: K. bolanderi

Binomial name
- Kyhosia bolanderi (A.Gray) B.G.Baldwin

Synonyms
- Madia bolanderi A.Gray

= Kyhosia =

Monotypic genus of plants

Kyhosia is a monotypic genus of flowering plants in the family Asteraceae containing the single species Kyhosia bolanderi, which is known by the common names Bolander's madia and kyhosia.

This plant was included in genus Madia until 1999, when it was separated and a new genus was created for it. The new genus is named for UC Davis botanist Donald Kyhos.

== Range ==
Kyhosia is native to the mountains of California from the Sierra Nevada north to the Klamath Mountains, where its distribution extends into southern Oregon. It is a plant of mountain meadows and other moist areas such as streambanks.

== Description ==
Kyhosia is a perennial herb which may exceed a meter in height. Its slender stem is bristly and covered in dark-colored, stalked resin glands. The bristly linear or lance-shaped leaves may be up to 30 centimeters long; those occurring oppositely along the stem are sometimes fused together at the bases. Those further up the stem are much smaller and alternately arranged.

The inflorescence is made up of one or more flower heads at the top of the stem. Each head has a bell-shaped involucre of bristly, glandular phyllaries at the base, a center of black-tipped yellow disc florets, and a fringe of 8 to 12 golden ray florets roughly 1 centimeter long. The fruit is a club-shaped achene just under a centimeter long; achenes arising from the disc florets have pappi of scales.
