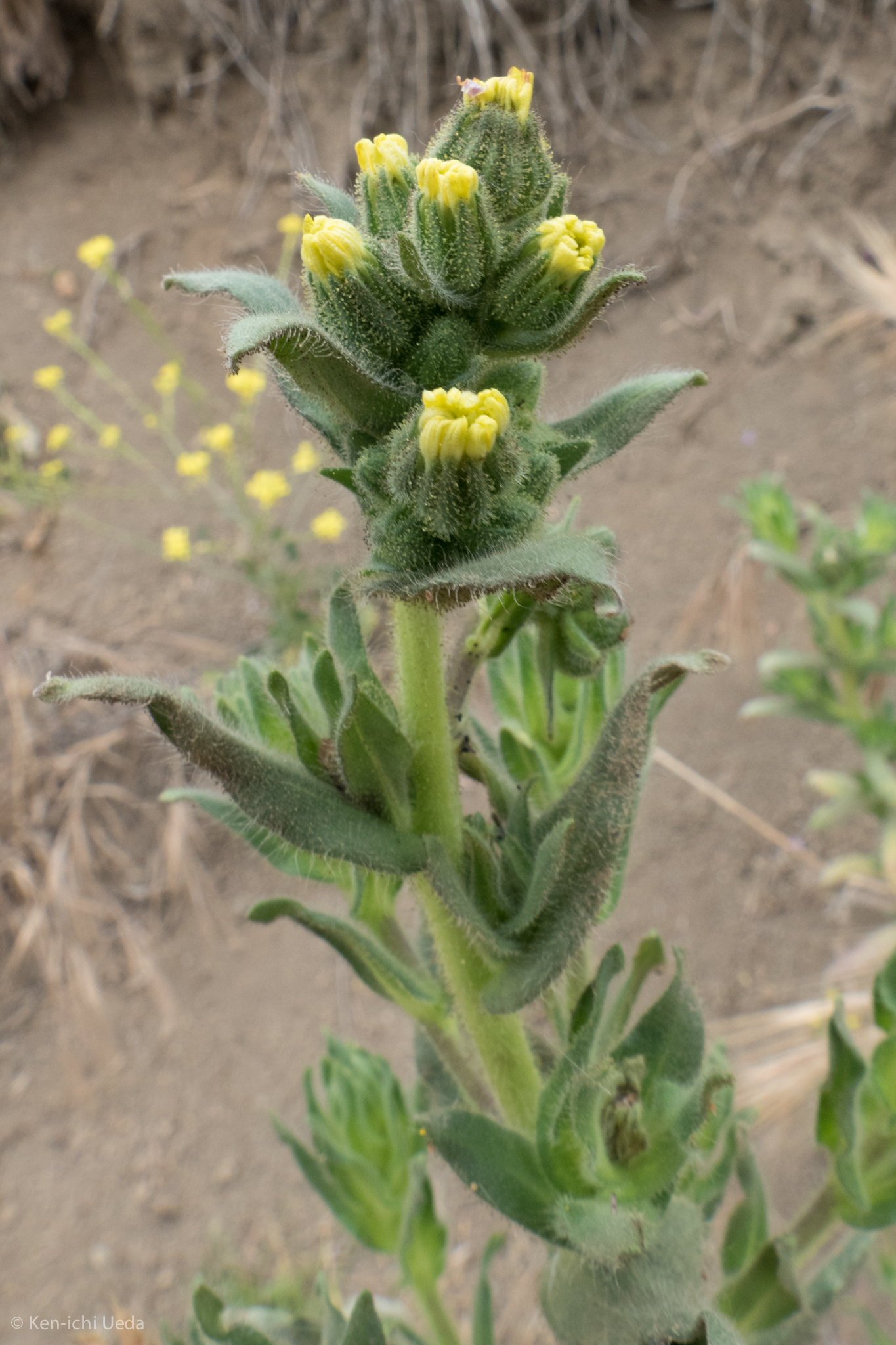

Conservation status
- Secure (NatureServe)

Scientific classification
- Kingdom: Plantae
- Clade: Tracheophytes
- Clade: Angiosperms
- Clade: Eudicots
- Clade: Asterids
- Order: Asterales
- Family: Asteraceae
- Genus: Madia
- Species: M. sativa

Binomial name
- Madia sativa Molina, 1782

Synonyms
- Synonymy: Biotia viscosa Cass.; Madia capitata Nutt.; Madia hirsuta Meyen; Madia mellita J.F.Gmel.; Madia mellosa Molina; Madia polycarpaea E.H.L.Krause; Madia racemosa Torr. & A.Gray; Madia sativa subsp. capitata Piper; Madia sativa var. congesta Torr. & A.Gray; Madia sativa subsp. congesta (Torr. & A.Gray) D.D.Keck; Madia sativa var. monstrosa DC.; Madia sativa var. racemosa (Nutt.) A.Gray; Madia sativa subsp. typica D.D.Keck; Madia stellata Fisch. & C.A.Mey.; Madia viscosa Cav.; Madorella racemosa Nutt.

= Madia sativa =

Species of plant

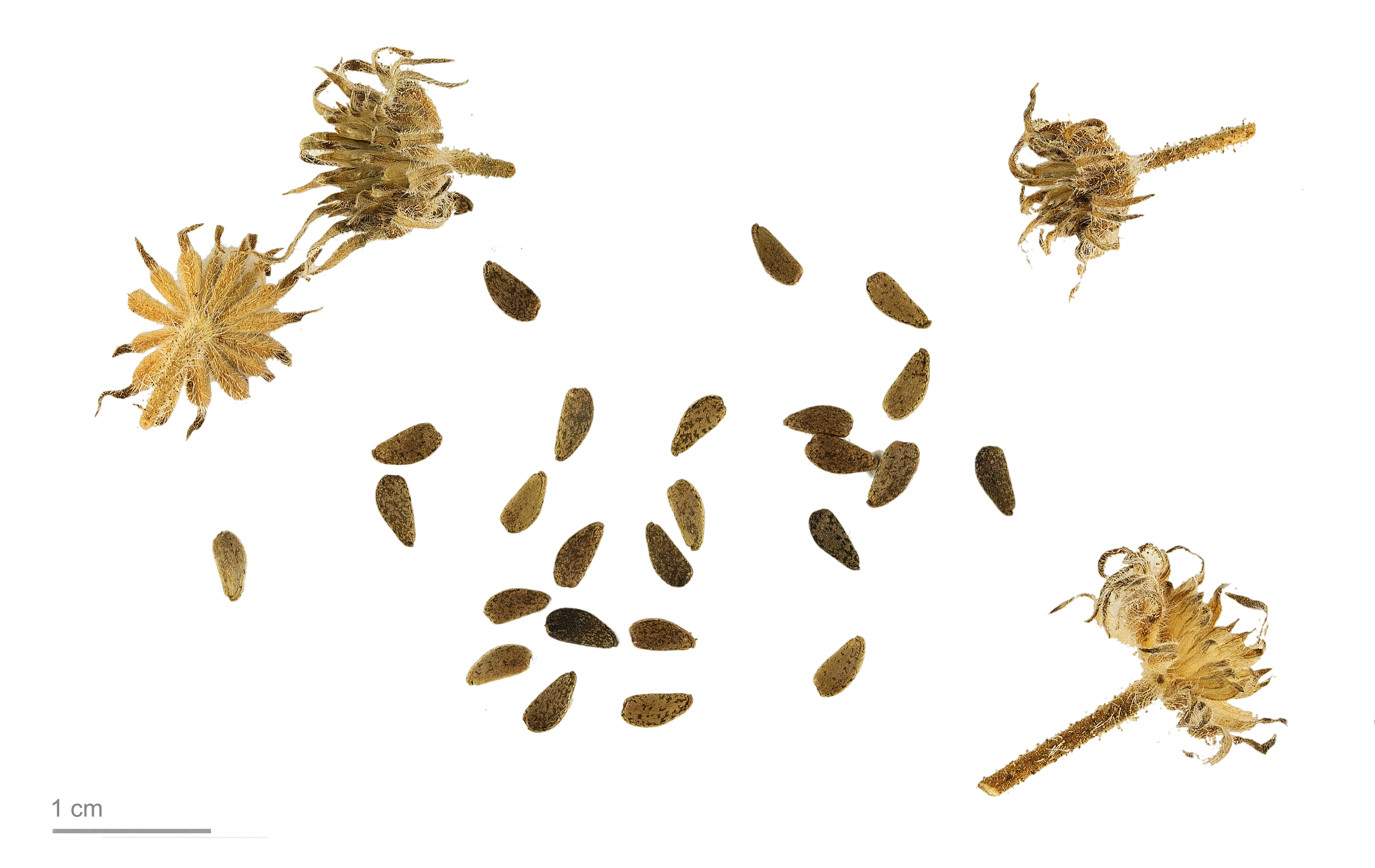
Madia sativa MHNT

Madia sativa, known by the common names coast tarweed and Chilean tarweed, is a species of flowering plant in the family Asteraceae found in parts of western North and South America.

== Distribution ==
Madia sativa is native to the Americas, where it is distributed in two main areas:

- The west coast of North America from Alaska and British Columbia, through all the western mountain ranges of California, to Baja California.
- South America in Chile and Argentina.

The plant grows in many types of habitats, including disturbed areas. In western North America it is most common on coastal grasslands and nearby areas.

== Description ==
Madia sativa is an annual herb varying in size from 20 centimeters tall to well over two meters, the leafy stem branching or not. It is coated densely in sticky resin glands and it has a strong scent. The hairy leaves are linear or lance-shaped, the lowest up to 18 centimeters long.

The inflorescence is generally a cluster of flower heads lined with bristly, glandular phyllaries. Each head bears approximately 8 yellowish ray florets a few millimeters long around a center of several disc florets tipped with dark anthers.

The fruit is a flat, hairless achene with no pappus. This plant has been grown for its seed oil.
