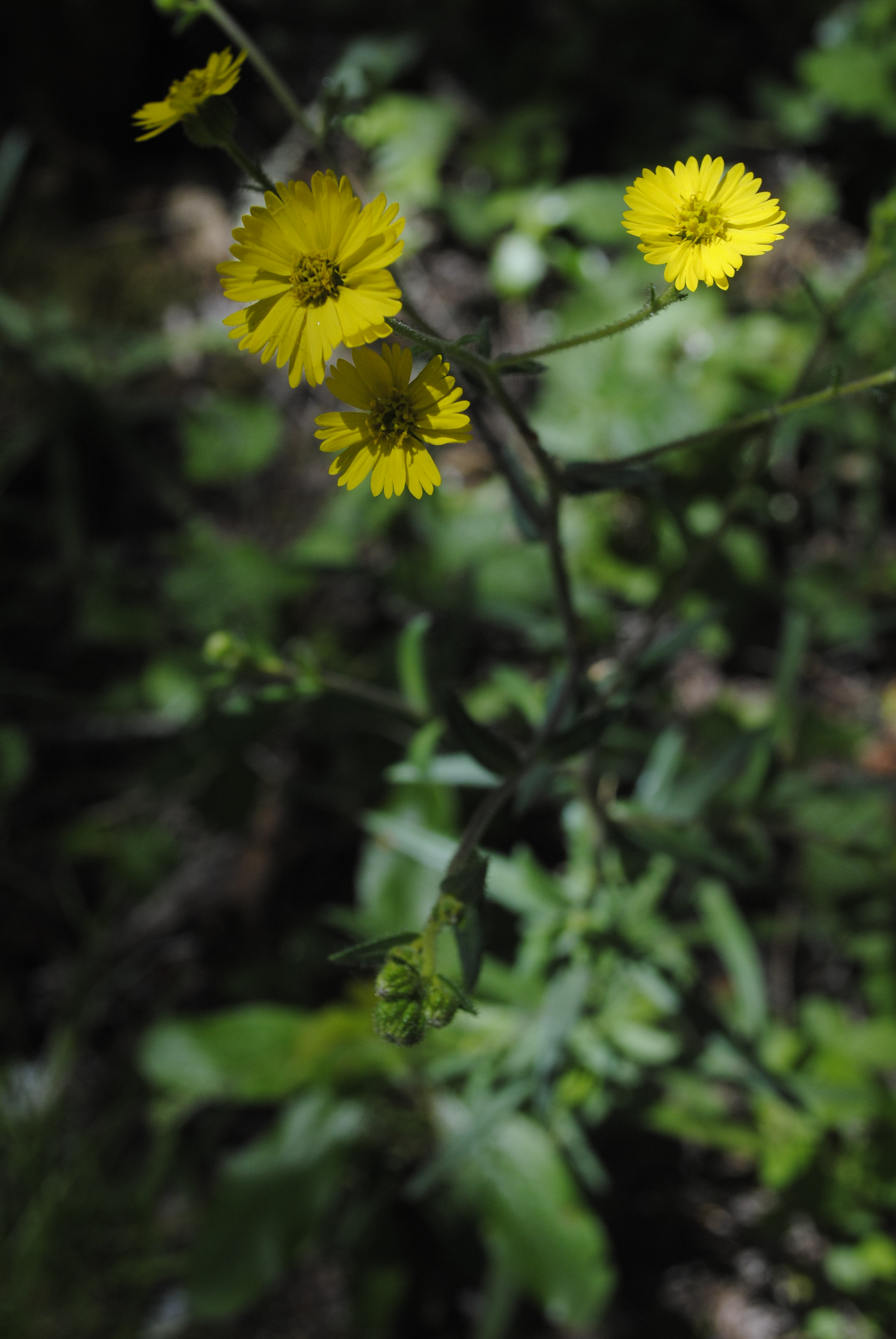
- Nature Reserve, University of California, Santa Cruz

Conservation status
- Secure (NatureServe)

Scientific classification
- Kingdom: Plantae
- Clade: Tracheophytes
- Clade: Angiosperms
- Clade: Eudicots
- Clade: Asterids
- Order: Asterales
- Family: Asteraceae
- Genus: Anisocarpus
- Species: A. madioides

Binomial name
- Anisocarpus madioides Nutt.

Synonyms
- Madia madioides (Nutt.) Greene

= Anisocarpus madioides =

Species of flowering plant

Anisocarpus madioides (syn. Madia madioides) is a North American species of flowering plant in the family Asteraceae known by the common name woodland madia or woodland tarweed.

== Description ==
Anisocarpus madioides is a perennial herb growing up to about 75 centimetres (30 in) in height, its stem coated in rough hairs and stalked resin glands. The lower leaves are up to 12 centimetres (4.7 in) long, oppositely arranged, and fused around the stem at the bases. The upper leaves are much smaller and often alternately arranged. The inflorescence produces several flower heads on long peduncles, each with a rounded involucre of glandular phyllaries. The heads bear yellow ray florets up to a centimetre long and many disc florets. The fruit is an achene a few millimetres long, usually with a small pappus. Flowers bloom April to September.

== Distribution and habitat ==
Anisocarpus madioides is native to the west coast of North America on Vancouver Island in the Canadian Province of British Columbia and the US States of Washington, Oregon, and California. It is a plant of forest and woodland habitat. Most of the populations occur in the Cascades and in the Coast Ranges from Vancouver Island to San Luis Obispo County, but there are additional collections from the foothills of the northern Sierra Nevada and the Agua Tibia Mountains of San Diego County.
