= Brittlestem =

Brittlestem is a common name for several organisms and may refer to:

- Mabrya acerifolia, a plant in the family Plantaginaceae, native to Arizona
- Psathyrella, a genus of fungi
- Psathyrotes, a genus of North American plants in the family Asteraceae
- Pseudobahia heermannii, a species of plant endemic to California
