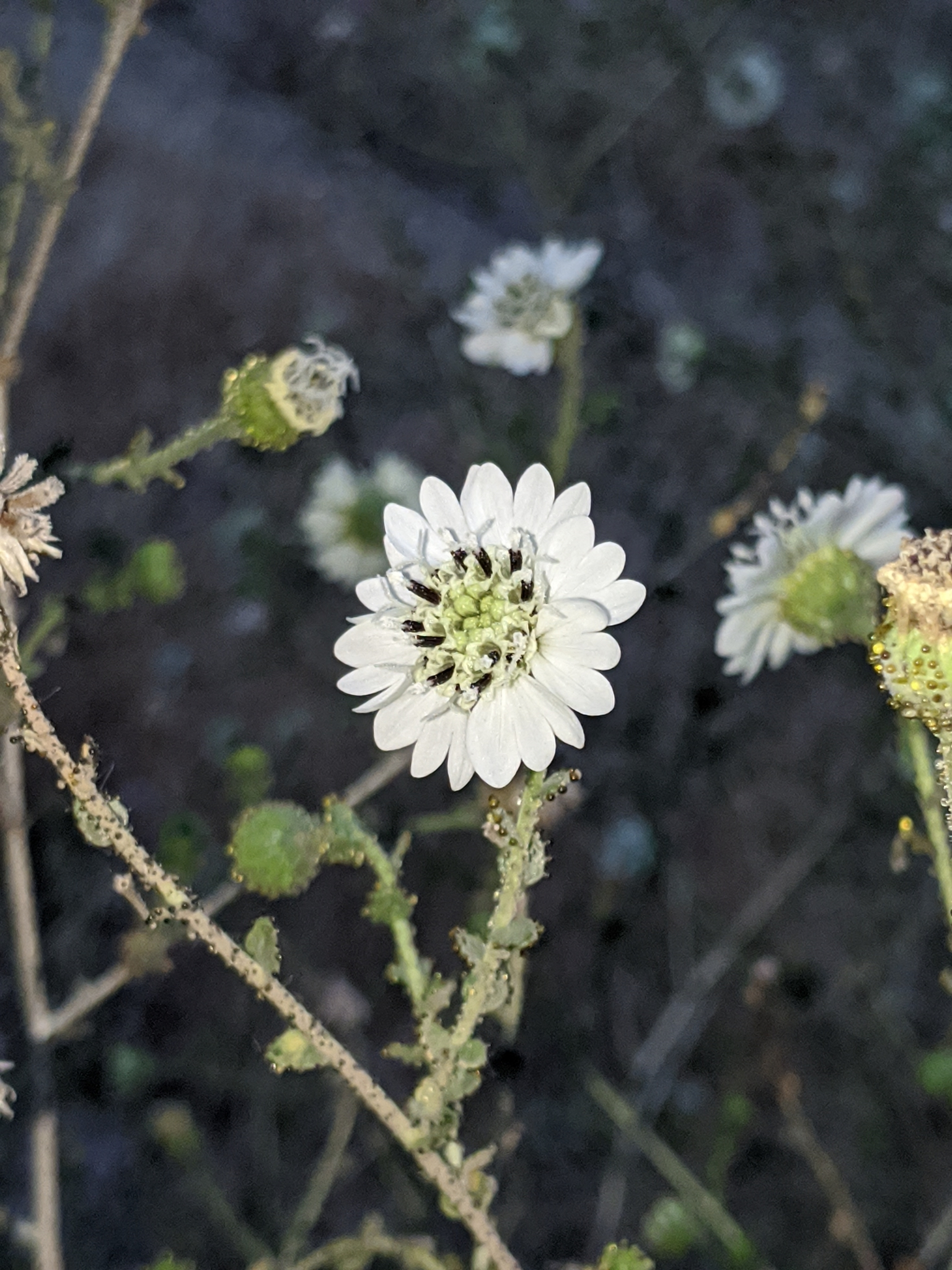

Conservation status
- Vulnerable (NatureServe)

Scientific classification
- Kingdom: Plantae
- Clade: Tracheophytes
- Clade: Angiosperms
- Clade: Eudicots
- Clade: Asterids
- Order: Asterales
- Family: Asteraceae
- Genus: Blepharizonia
- Species: B. laxa

Binomial name
- Blepharizonia laxa Greene

Synonyms
- Blepharizonia plumosa var. subplumosa (A.Gray) Jeps.; Blepharizonia plumosa subsp. viscida D.D.Keck; Hemizonia plumosa var. subplumosa A.Gray

= Blepharizonia laxa =

Species of flowering plant

Blepharizonia laxa is a California species of tarweed known by the common name glandular big tarweed.

== Distribution ==
The plant is endemic to central California, where it grows in the Central Coast Ranges and adjacent areas of the southern San Francisco Bay Area and Central Valley, from Contra Costa County to as far south as San Luis Obispo County.

It is native to California chaparral and woodlands habitats.

== Description ==
Blepharizonia laxa is similar to its relative, B. plumosa. It tends, however, to be yellow-green rather than gray-green, and covered with many more stalked glands.
