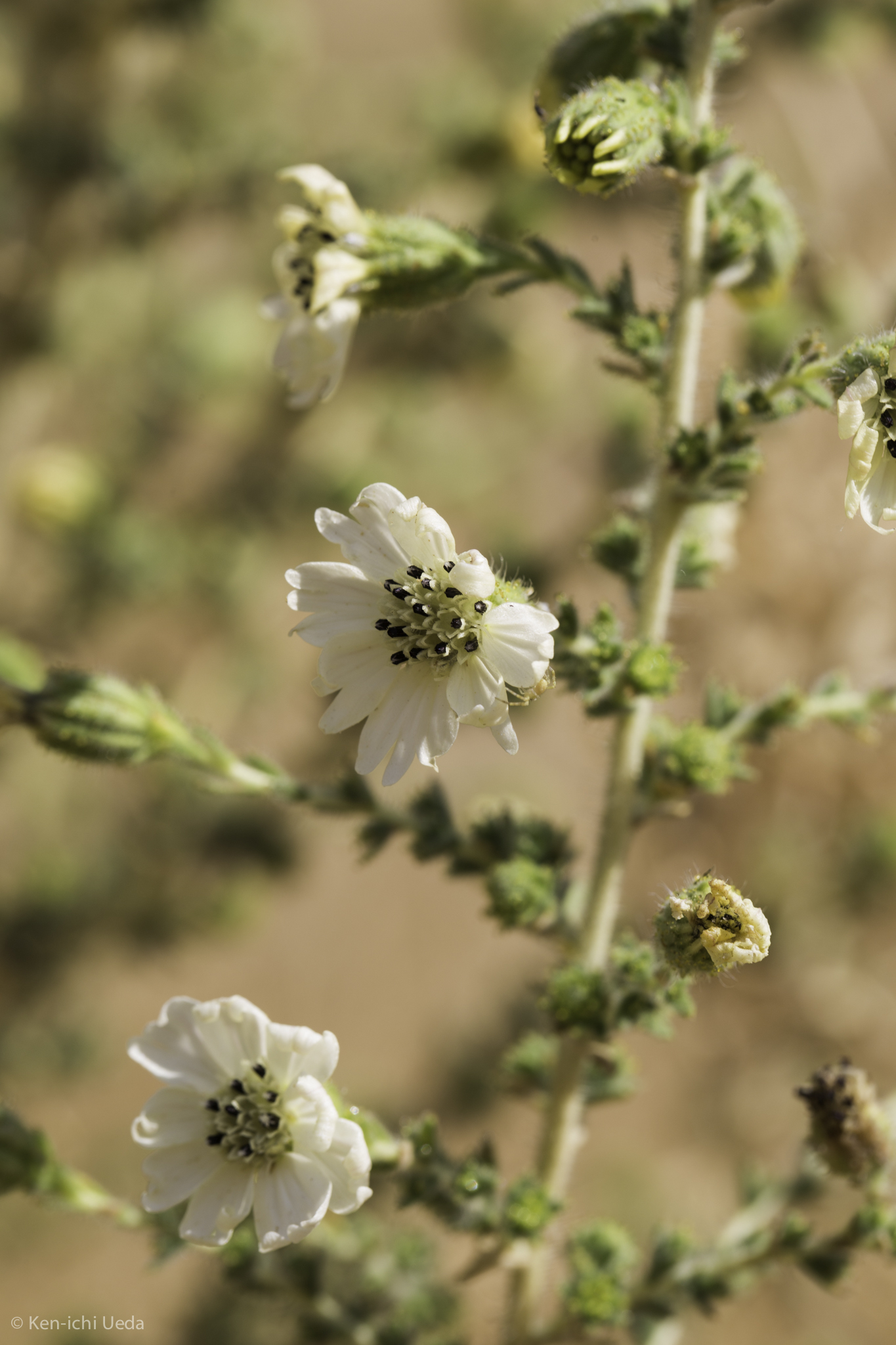

Conservation status
- Apparently Secure (NatureServe)

Scientific classification
- Kingdom: Plantae
- Clade: Tracheophytes
- Clade: Angiosperms
- Clade: Eudicots
- Clade: Asterids
- Order: Asterales
- Family: Asteraceae
- Genus: Blepharizonia
- Species: B. plumosa

Binomial name
- Blepharizonia plumosa (Kellogg) Greene

Synonyms
- Calycadenia plumosa Kellogg; Hemizonia plumosa (Kellogg) A.Gray

= Blepharizonia plumosa =

Species of flowering plant

Blepharizonia plumosa is a California species of tarweed known by the common name big tarweed. It is endemic to central California, where it grows in the Central Coast Ranges and adjacent sections of the southern San Francisco Bay Area and Central Valley, from southern Sonoma County south as far as San Luis Obispo County.

== Description ==
This is a glandular, aromatic annual herb producing a hairy, erect stem which may approach two meters (80 inches) in height. The leaves are linear in shape and sometimes toothed, the largest located near the base of the plant reaching 15 centimeters (6 inches) long. The inflorescence bears several flower heads, each with a fringe of up to 13 red-veined white ray florets just under a centimeter long. The center of each head is filled with protruding tubular disc florets with large dark anthers. The fruit is a hairy, club-shaped achene which may or may not have a pappus at the tip.

Blepharizonia is sometimes treated as a monotypic genus, and sometimes as a genus with two species. One variety or subspecies of B. plumosa is sometimes treated as a distinct species called Blepharizonia laxa.
