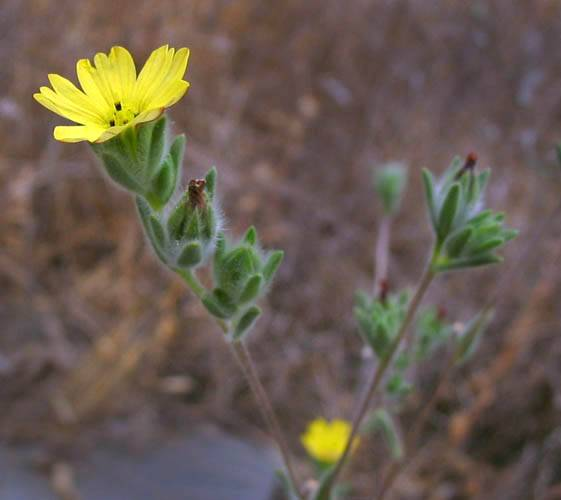

Scientific classification
- Kingdom: Plantae
- Clade: Tracheophytes
- Clade: Angiosperms
- Clade: Eudicots
- Clade: Asterids
- Order: Asterales
- Family: Asteraceae
- Genus: Lagophylla
- Species: L. ramosissima

Binomial name
- Lagophylla ramosissima Nutt.

= Lagophylla ramosissima =

Species of flowering plant

Lagophylla ramosissima is a species of flowering plant in the family Asteraceae. It is known by the common name branched hareleaf, or branched lagophylla. It is native to the western United States where it can be found in many types of habitat, especially in dry areas. This is an annual herb producing spindly, erect stems which are variable in height. The leaves on the lower part of the plant are up to 12 centimeters long and fall off the plant early on in the season. The upper leaves are smaller and have woolly, glandular surfaces. The inflorescence is sparsely flowered in flower heads which open in the evening and close early in the morning. Each small head has five short light yellow ray florets with lobed tips, and six yellow disc florets. The fruit is an achene a few millimeters long with no pappus.
