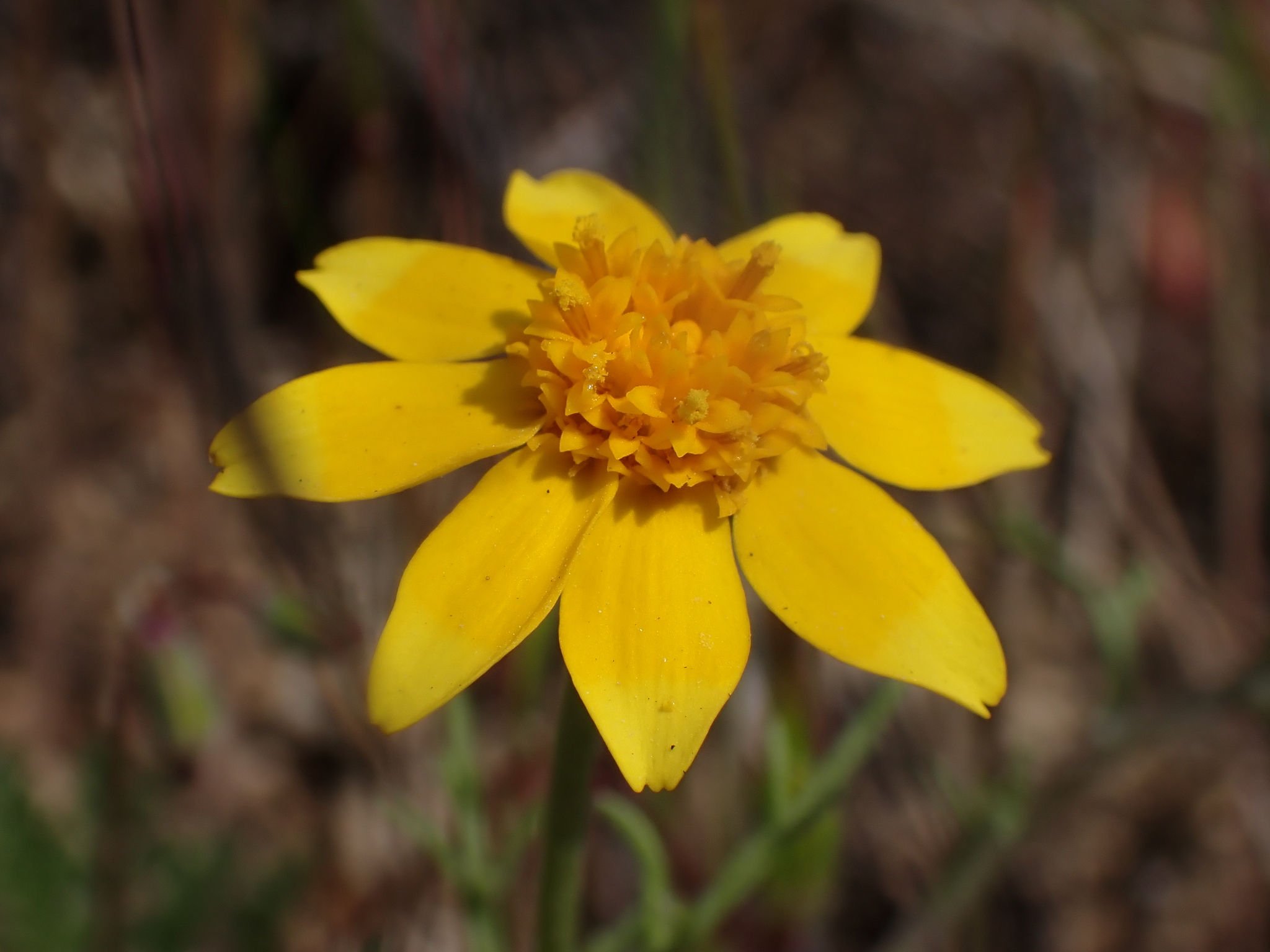
- Pseudobahia heermannii

Scientific classification
- Kingdom: Plantae
- Clade: Tracheophytes
- Clade: Angiosperms
- Clade: Eudicots
- Clade: Asterids
- Order: Asterales
- Family: Asteraceae
- Subfamily: Asteroideae
- Tribe: Madieae
- Subtribe: Baeriinae
- Genus: Pseudobahia (A.Gray) Rydb.

Type species
- Monolopia bahiifolia Benth.

Synonyms
- Monolopia sect. Pseudobahia A.Gray

= Pseudobahia =

Genus of plants

Pseudobahia is a genus of California plants in the tribe Madieae within the family Asteraceae. These plants are known generally as sunbursts.

Species

- Pseudobahia bahiifolia (Benth.) Rydb. - Hartweg's golden sunburst (endangered)
- Pseudobahia heermannii (Durand) Rydb. - foothill sunburst
- Pseudobahia peirsonii Munz - San Joaquin adobe sunburst (threatened)
