= Adenothamnus =

Scientific classification
- Kingdom: Plantae
- Clade: Tracheophytes
- Clade: Angiosperms
- Clade: Eudicots
- Clade: Asterids
- Order: Asterales
- Family: Asteraceae
- Subfamily: Asteroideae
- Tribe: Madieae
- Subtribe: Madiinae
- Genus: Adenothamnus; D.D.Keck
- Species: A. validus

Binomial name
- Adenothamnus validus (Brandegee) D.D.Keck

Synonyms
- Madia valida Brandegee

Genus of flowering plants

Adenothamnus is a genus of flowering plants in the family Asteraceae described as a genus in 1935.

There is only one known species, Adenothamnus validus, endemic to the Baja California Peninsula in Mexico.
