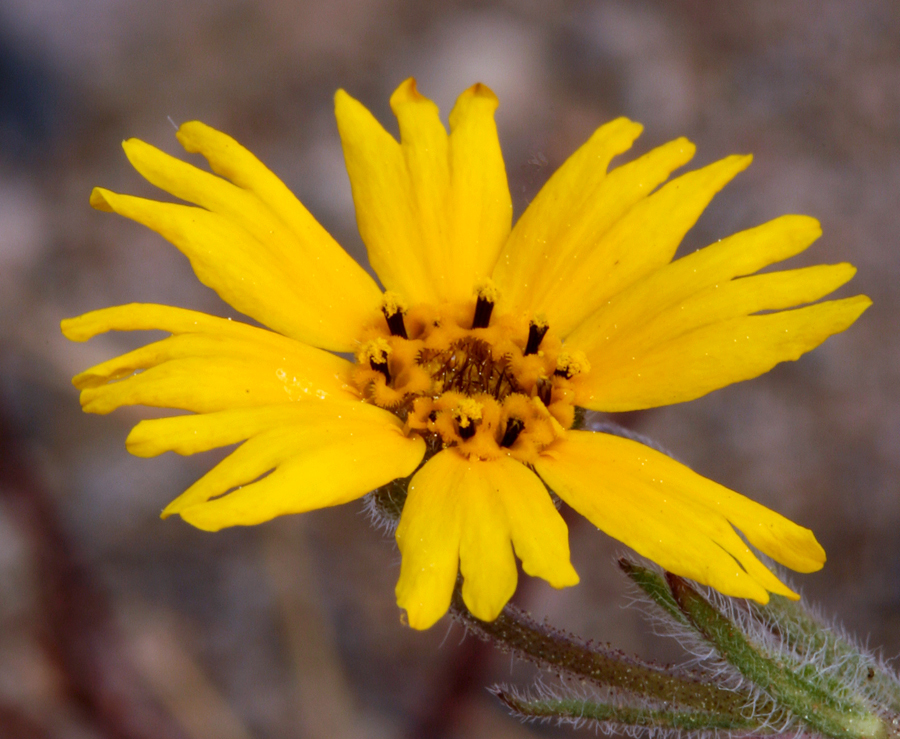

Scientific classification
- Kingdom: Plantae
- Clade: Tracheophytes
- Clade: Angiosperms
- Clade: Eudicots
- Clade: Asterids
- Order: Asterales
- Family: Asteraceae
- Genus: Jensia
- Species: J. rammii

Binomial name
- Jensia rammii (Greene) B.G.Baldwin

Synonyms
- Madia rammii Greene; Anisocarpus rammii (Greene) Greene

= Jensia rammii =

Species of flowering plant

Jensia rammii is a species of flowering plant in the family Asteraceae known by the common name Ramm's madia. It is endemic to California, where it is limited to the northern slopes of the Sierra Nevada and its foothills.

Jensia rammii is an annual herb with a hairy, glandular, branching stem up to 60 centimeters (2 feet) tall. The inflorescence produces flower heads on long peduncles. The head has 5-12 yellow ray florets up to a centimeter (0.4 inches) long with lobed tips. The 16–65 yellow disc florets at the center have black anthers. The fruit is an achene a few millimeters long.
