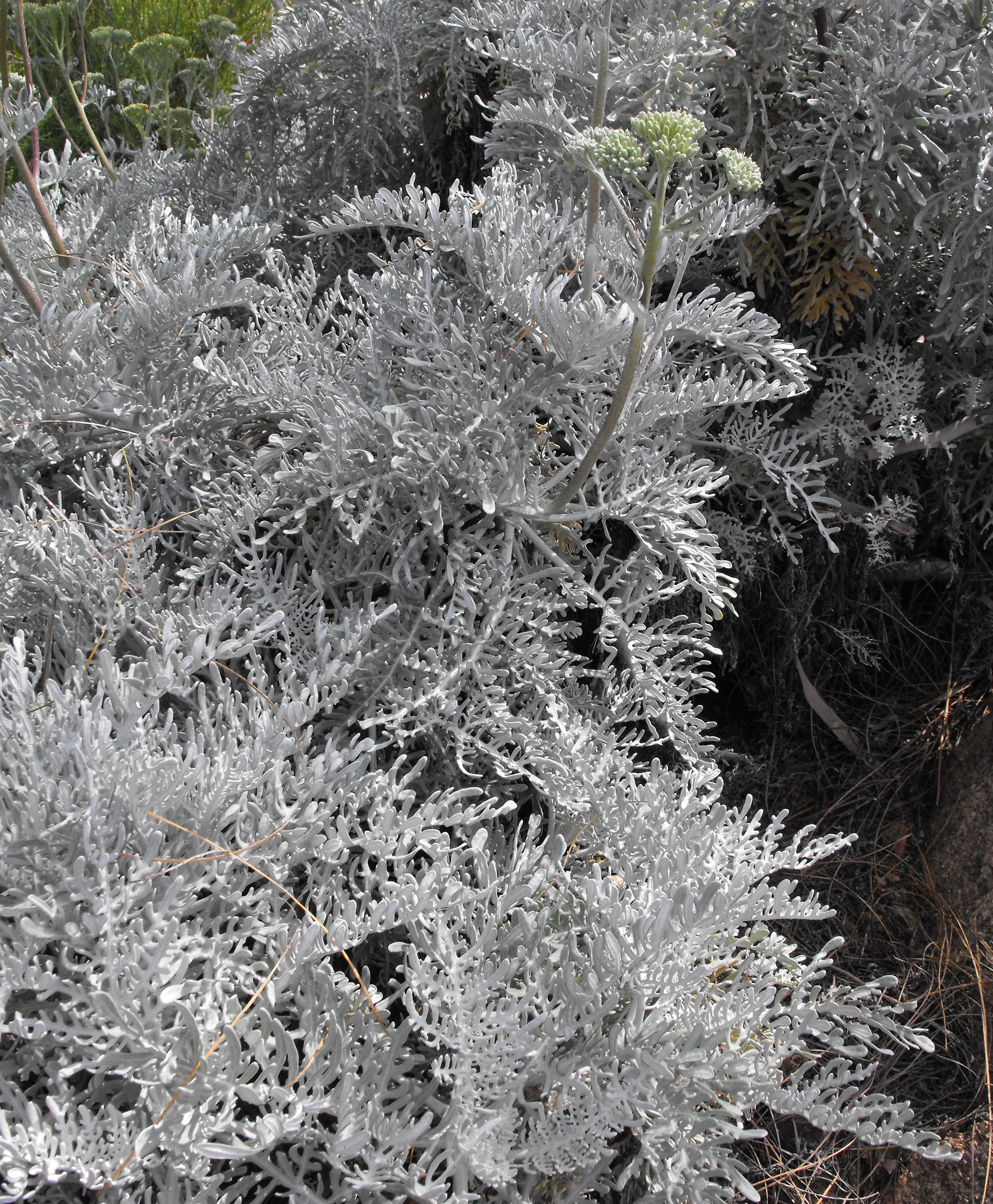

Conservation status
- Imperiled (NatureServe)

Scientific classification
- Kingdom: Plantae
- Clade: Tracheophytes
- Clade: Angiosperms
- Clade: Eudicots
- Clade: Asterids
- Order: Asterales
- Family: Asteraceae
- Subfamily: Asteroideae
- Tribe: Madieae
- Subtribe: Baeriinae
- Genus: Constancea; B.G.Baldwin
- Species: C. nevinii

Binomial name
- Constancea nevinii (A.Gray) B.G.Baldwin

= Constancea =

Genus of flowering plants

Constancea is a monotypic genus of flowering plants in the family Asteraceae containing the single species Constancea nevinii (formerly Eriophyllum nevinii), which is known by the common name Nevin's woolly sunflower. It is endemic to three of the Channel Islands of California, where it grows in coastal scrub habitat. This is a small shrub or subshrub generally growing up to one or 1.5 meters tall, and taller when an erect form, with a branching, woolly stem. The whitish, woolly oval leaves may be up to 20 centimeters long and are divided into many narrow lobes with edges curled under. The inflorescence is a cluster of 10 to 50 or more small flower heads, each on a short peduncle. The flower head has a center of hairy, glandular, star-shaped yellow disc florets and a fringe of four to nine yellow ray florets, each about 2 millimeters long. The fruit is an achene a few millimeters long with a small pappus at the tip.

Like many Channel Islands endemics, this plant was threatened with extinction by the herbivory of the feral goats living on the islands; the goats have since been removed, and the plant is recovering.

Genetic analyses indicate that this species, previously called Eriophyllum nevinii, did not come from the same common ancestor as the other Eriophyllum species and so is not close enough relative to be included in that genus. Genus Constancea was created for the plant in 2000 and named for botanist Lincoln Constance.
