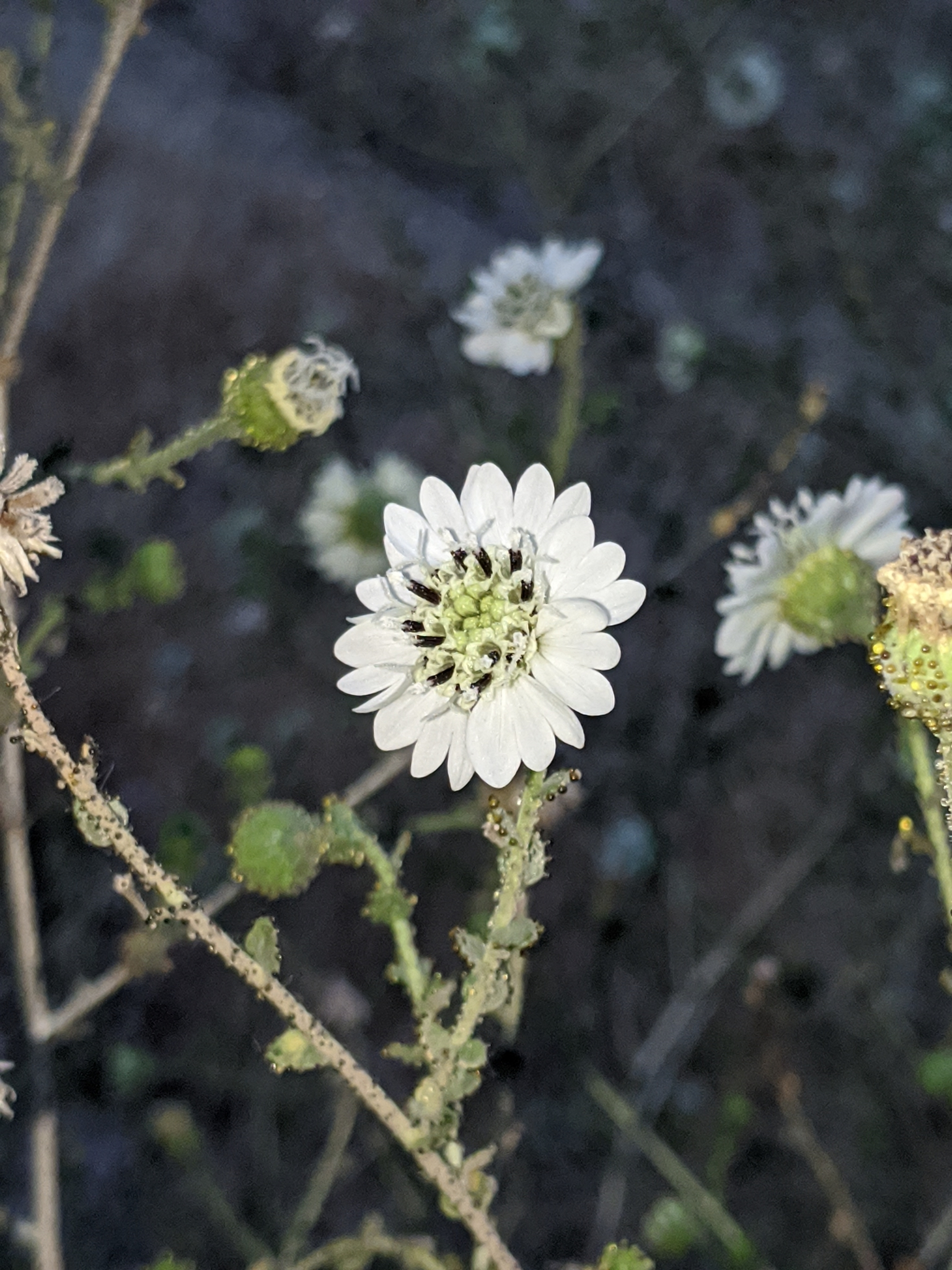
- Blepharizonia laxa

Scientific classification
- Kingdom: Plantae
- Clade: Tracheophytes
- Clade: Angiosperms
- Clade: Eudicots
- Clade: Asterids
- Order: Asterales
- Family: Asteraceae
- Subfamily: Asteroideae
- Tribe: Madieae
- Subtribe: Madiinae
- Genus: Blepharizonia (A.Gray) Greene

Type species
- Blepharizonia plumosa (Kellogg) Greene

Synonyms
- Hemizonia subgen. Blepharizonia A.Gray

= Blepharizonia =

Genus of flowering plants

Blepharizonia is a genus of flowering plants in the family Asteraceae. There are two species, both endemic to California. They are known generally as big tarweeds.

The genus long included only the single species B. plumosa, which was divided into two subspecies. Studies of the plant indicated that the subspecies had low interfertility, rarely interbreeding when growing together. They were also evolutionarily divergent and had significant morphological and ecological distinctions. One of the subspecies was elevated to species status and is now usually treated as B. laxa.

== Description ==
These are annual herbs varying in height from 10 centimeters (4 inches) to over 1.8 meters (6 feet). They are strongly scented. The leaves are oppositely arranged near the base of the stem, and alternately arranged along most of the plant. They are linear, lance-shaped, or narrowly spatula-shaped, and sometimes toothed. The herbage is hairy to bristly and often glandular. The flower heads are often borne in wide arrays or spikelike inflorescences; B. laxa may have solitary heads. The hairy, glandular phyllaries grow close to the ray florets and can remain attached to the fruits they bear. The deeply lobed ray florets are usually whitish, often with red or purple nerves along the undersides. They are up to a centimeter long or longer. There are few to many whitish or purplish disc florets with purple anthers. The fruit is a ribbed cypsela, sometimes with a pappus of scales.

== Species ==
- Blepharizonia laxa – yellow-green herbage, more glandular, flower heads solitary or on wandlike branches, pappus small or absent; western San Joaquin Valley, eastern San Francisco Bay Area, South Coast Ranges
- Blepharizonia plumosa (big tarplant) – gray-green herbage, less glandular, flower heads on arching branches, pappus present; northwestern San Joaquin Valley, eastern San Francisco Bay Area, and south as far as San Luis Obispo County
