= Holozonia =

Scientific classification
- Kingdom: Plantae
- Clade: Tracheophytes
- Clade: Angiosperms
- Clade: Eudicots
- Clade: Asterids
- Order: Asterales
- Family: Asteraceae
- Subfamily: Asteroideae
- Tribe: Madieae
- Subtribe: Madiinae
- Genus: Holozonia; Greene
- Species: H. filipes

Binomial name
- Holozonia filipes (Hook. & Arn.) Greene

Synonyms
- Hemizonia filipes Hook. & Arn.; Lagophylla filipes (Hook. & Arn.) A.Gray

Genus of flowering plants

Holozonia is a North American genus of flowering plants in the family Asteraceae. It contains only one known species Holozonia filipes, which is known by the common name whitecrown. It is endemic to California.

Holozonia filipes is a scraggly rhizomatous perennial herb growing a hairy, glandular, branching stem 30 centimeters (1 foot) to 1.5 meters (5 feet) long. The lower stem is gray-green and the upper stem branches are green to red in color. The lance-shaped leaves are up to 10 centimeters (4 inches) long and covered in resin glands. They are arranged oppositely on the lower part of the stem. The flower heads appear at the ends of the stem branches in a loose inflorescence. Each head has layers of sticky, hairy phyllaries. The ray florets are each divided into long lobes and are white in color. The disc florets are white with large purple anthers.
