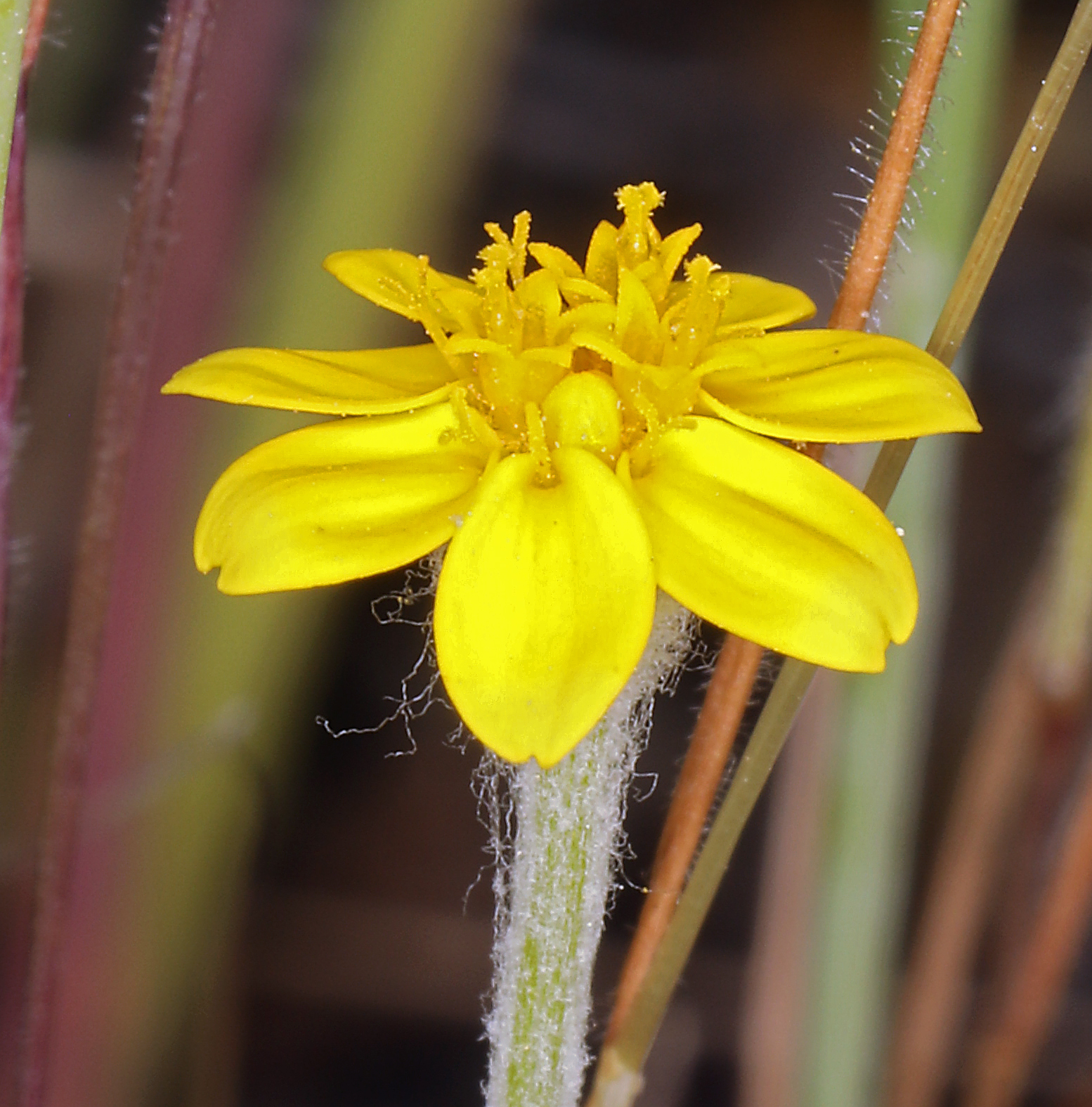

Conservation status
- Endangered (ESA)

Scientific classification
- Kingdom: Plantae
- Clade: Tracheophytes
- Clade: Angiosperms
- Clade: Eudicots
- Clade: Asterids
- Order: Asterales
- Family: Asteraceae
- Genus: Pseudobahia
- Species: P. bahiifolia

Binomial name
- Pseudobahia bahiifolia (Benth.) Rydb.

Synonyms
- Monolopia bahiifolia

= Pseudobahia bahiifolia =

Species of plant

Pseudobahia bahiifolia is a rare species of flowering plant in the family Asteraceae known by the common name Hartweg's golden sunburst.

== Distribution ==
Pseudobahia bahiifolia is endemic to California, where it is known from a few small occurrences along the eastern side of the Central Valley and the lower central Sierra Nevada foothills. It grows in grassland and oak woodland habitat. It prefers heavy clay soils, particularly along the tops of Mima mounds. The plant's native range is on land that has been heavily altered by agriculture, leaving little habitat intact, and the plant became a federally listed endangered species of the United States in 1997.

== Description ==
This species, Pseudobahia bahiifolia, is an annual herb growing 5 to 20 centimeters tall. It has a thin coating of woolly hairs. The linear or lance-shaped leaves are up to 2.5 centimeters long and often have three small lobes near the tips.

The inflorescence is a solitary sunflowerlike flower head lined with three to eight phyllaries. There is one golden ray floret per phyllary, up to a centimeter in length and sometimes faintly toothed at the tip. At the center of the head are yellow disc florets. The blooming period is 3 to 4 weeks long, occurring in March and April. The fruit is an achene about 2 millimeters long.

== Conservation status ==
The main threat to its remaining populations is destruction of its habitat for residential development. About 90% of all individuals of this species occur in two main locations, one of which was scheduled to be cleared for housing construction when the plant was listed as an endangered species.
