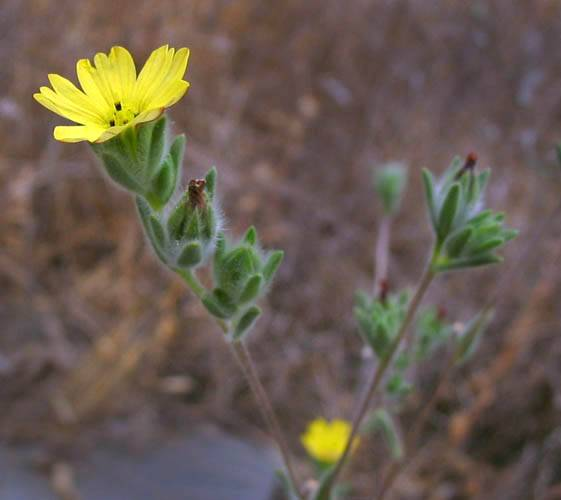
- Lagophylla ramosissima

Scientific classification
- Kingdom: Plantae
- Clade: Tracheophytes
- Clade: Angiosperms
- Clade: Eudicots
- Clade: Asterids
- Order: Asterales
- Family: Asteraceae
- Subfamily: Asteroideae
- Tribe: Madieae
- Subtribe: Madiinae
- Genus: Lagophylla; Nutt.

= Lagophylla =

Genus of flowering plants

Lagophylla is a small genus of flowering plants in the family Asteraceae. The genus is native to western North America, especially California.

These are annual plants with small yellow flowers which open during the night. The leaves are covered with dense hairs, hence the common name, hareleaf, and the scientific name, Lagophylla, which is derived from the Greek terms lagos (λαγώς; 'hare') and phyllon (φύλλον; 'leaf'). Thomas Nuttall describes the leaves with their "abundant, soft, white, silky hairs" as resembling the foot of a hare, and says he named the genus "from the leaves being clad with long, soft hairs."

Species

- Lagophylla diabolensis - California (Diablo Range)
- Lagophylla dichotoma - forked hareleaf - California (San Benito, Fresno, + Monterey Cos)
- Lagophylla glandulosa - glandular hareleaf - California
- Lagophylla minor - lesser hareleaf - northern California
- Lagophylla ramosissima - branched hareleaf - from San Diego County to Montana + Washington
