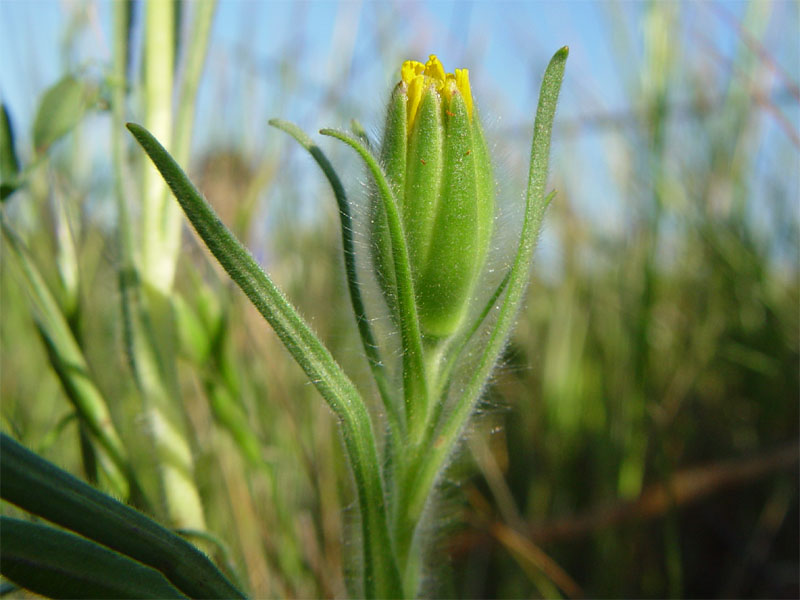
- Foliage and flower

Conservation status
- Secure (NatureServe)

Scientific classification
- Kingdom: Plantae
- Clade: Tracheophytes
- Clade: Angiosperms
- Clade: Eudicots
- Clade: Asterids
- Order: Asterales
- Family: Asteraceae
- Subfamily: Asteroideae
- Tribe: Madieae
- Subtribe: Madiinae
- Genus: Achyrachaena; Schauer
- Species: A. mollis

Binomial name
- Achyrachaena mollis Schauer

= Achyrachaena =

Genus of flowering plants

The only species in the monotypic genus Achyrachaena is the annual herb Achyrachaena mollis, which bears the common name blow-wives. The genus name is both singular and plural.

The plant is common in low-elevation hills, higher mountains, valleys, and grasslands across California from the coast to the Sierra Nevada, north into southern Oregon, and south into northern Baja California, Mexico.

Achyrachaena mollis has some invasive potential in introduced locations, but is not recorded as one of the more troublesome weeds.

== Description ==
Achyrachaena mollis is a flower which grows to approximately one foot in height on a strong, straight stem. Atop the stem is a large, rounded bud which opens into a spherical cluster of flowers. The actual flowers are small and yellow and nearly invisible behind the showy fruits, which extend shiny bright white scales which look like long rectangular flower petals. These silky white scales catch the wind, which allows the single-seeded fruits to be dispersed.

== Gallery ==
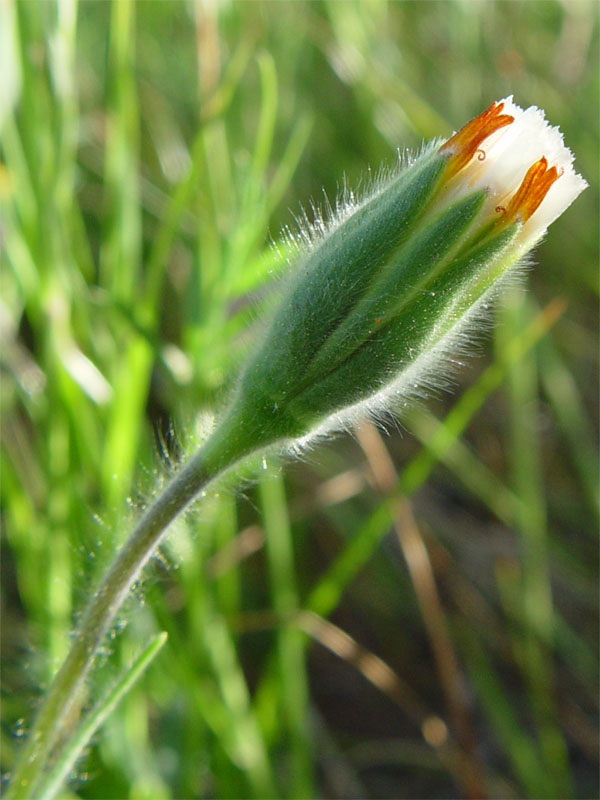
Achyrachaena mollis flower, side view

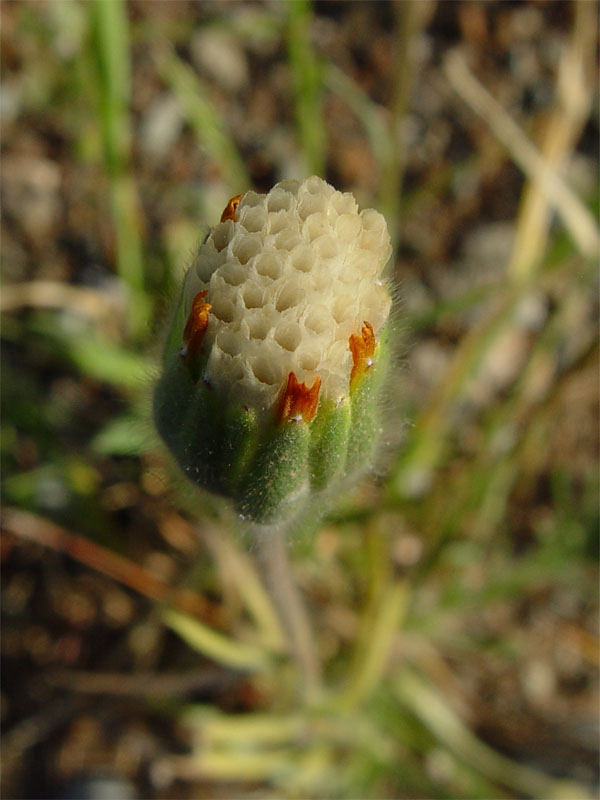
Flower, top view

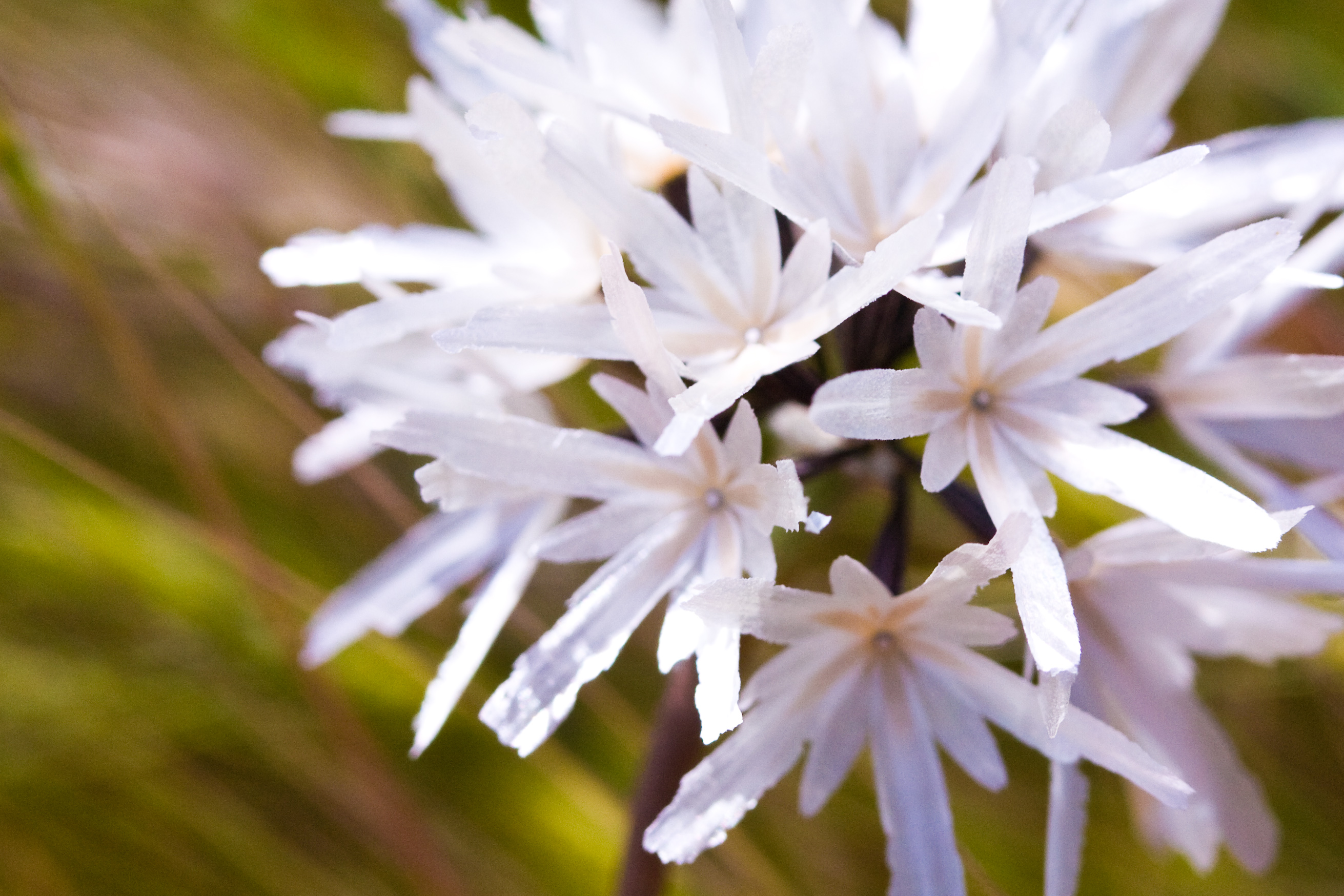
The distinctive 'blow-wives' seed head, ready for distribution by the wind.
