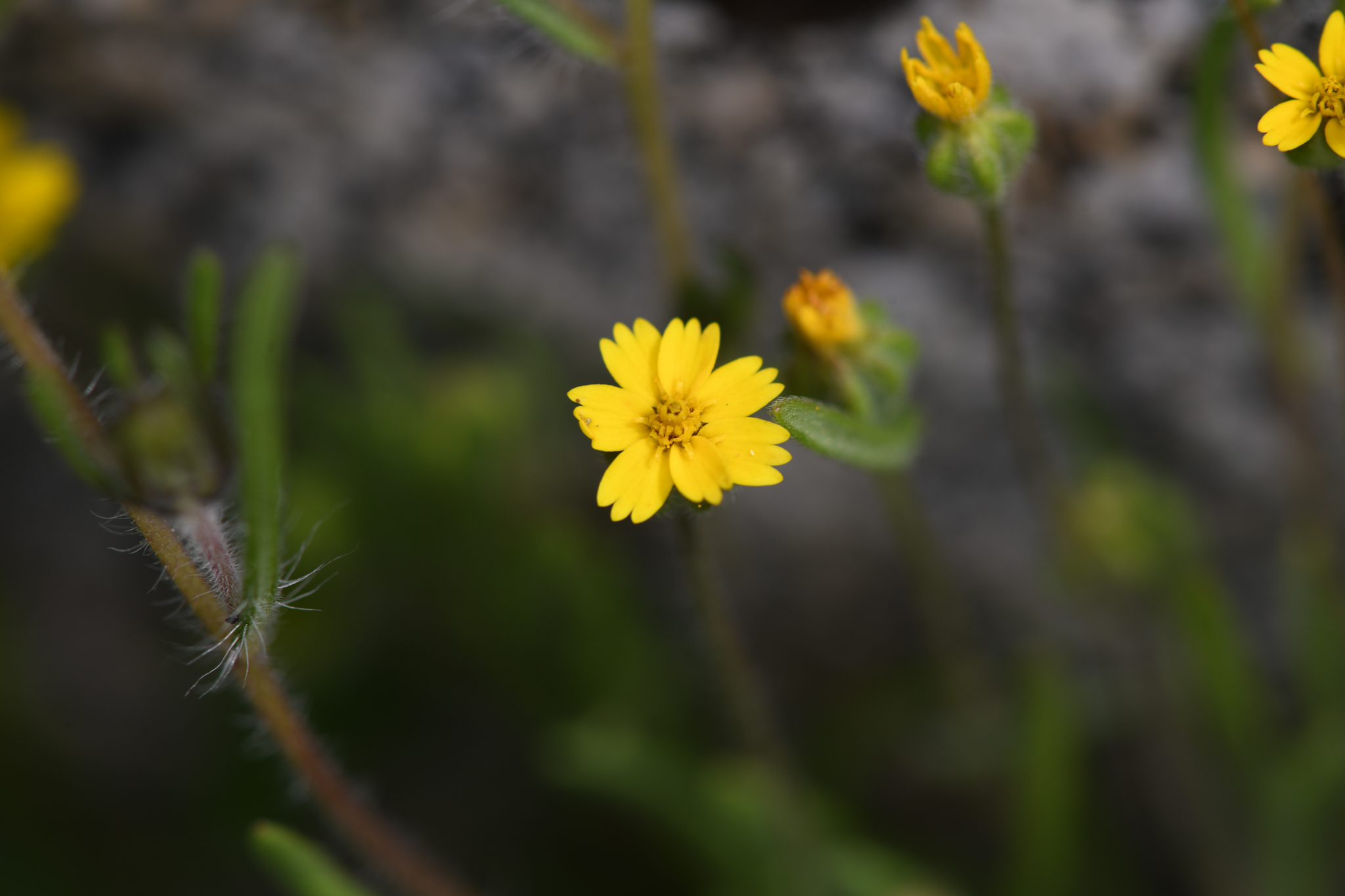

Scientific classification
- Kingdom: Plantae
- Clade: Embryophytes
- Clade: Tracheophytes
- Clade: Spermatophytes
- Clade: Angiosperms
- Clade: Eudicots
- Clade: Asterids
- Order: Asterales
- Family: Asteraceae
- Genus: Jensia
- Species: J. yosemitana

Binomial name
- Jensia yosemitana (Parry ex A.Gray) B.G.Baldwin

Synonyms
- Madia yosemitana Parry ex A.Gray; Anisocarpus yosemitanus (Parry ex A.Gray) Greene

= Jensia yosemitana =

Species of flowering plant

Jensia yosemitana is a species of flowering plant in the family Asteraceae known by the common name Yosemite tarweed. It is endemic to California, where it has a scattered distribution across the Sierra Nevada and its foothills. Some of the populations lie inside Yosemite National Park.

Jensia yosemitana is an annual herb with a slender stem up to 25 centimeters (10 inches) tall. The hairy to bristly leaves are 1 to 3 centimeters (0.4-1.2 inches) long and located all along the stem. The inflorescence produces flower heads on thin, threadlike peduncles. The head generally has 2-8 yellow ray florets each about 2 millimeters (0.08 inches) long and 1-7 yellow disc florets with black anthers. The fruit is an achene with a bristly or scaly pappus.
