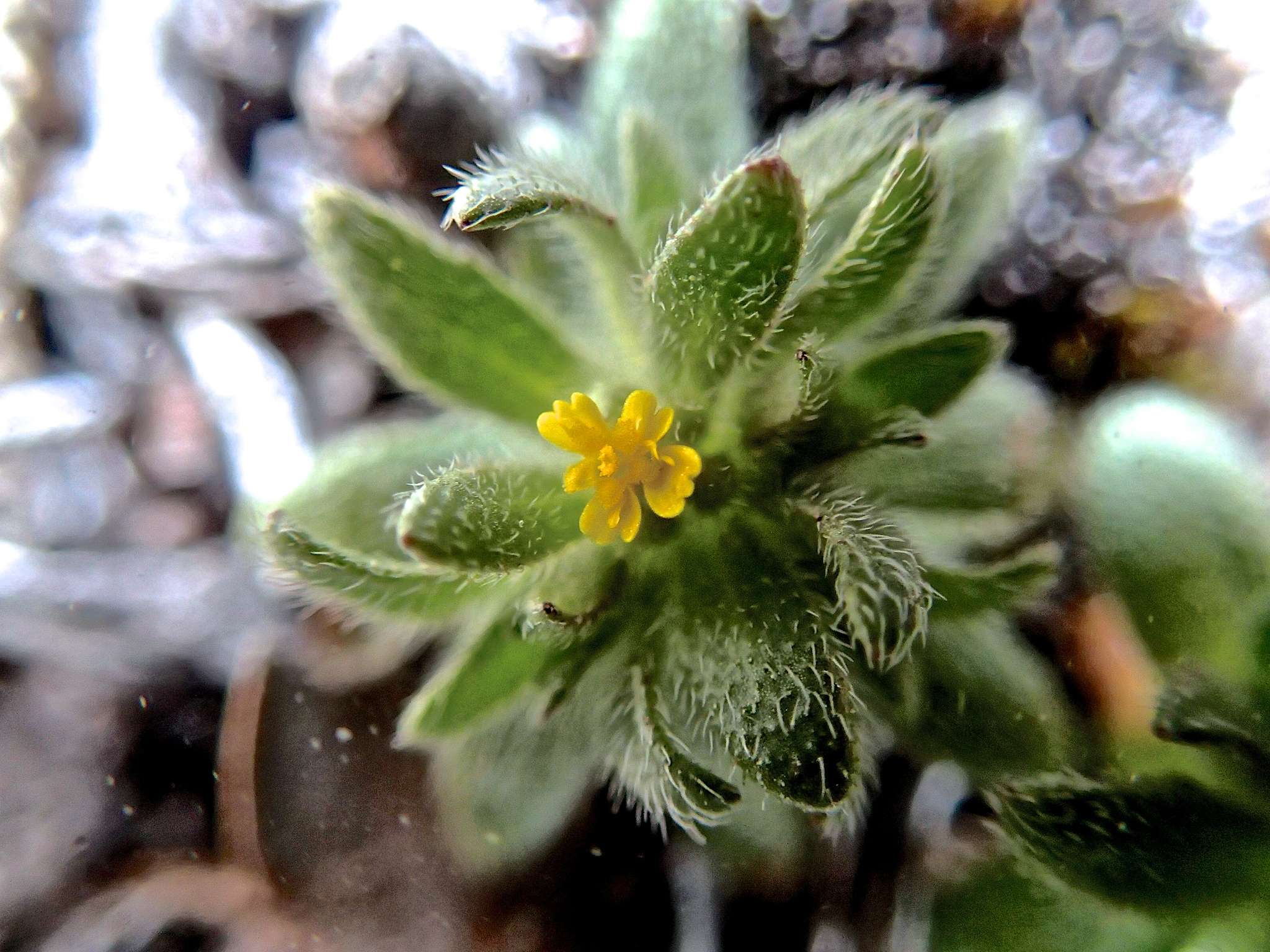

Scientific classification
- Kingdom: Plantae
- Clade: Embryophytes
- Clade: Tracheophytes
- Clade: Angiosperms
- Clade: Eudicots
- Clade: Asterids
- Order: Asterales
- Family: Asteraceae
- Subfamily: Asteroideae
- Tribe: Madieae
- Subtribe: Madiinae
- Genus: Hemizonella (A.Gray) A.Gray
- Species: H. minima

Binomial name
- Hemizonella minima A.Gray

Synonyms
- Hemizonia § Hemizonella A. Gray; Hemizonia minima A.Gray; Harpaecarpus minimus (A.Gray) Greene; Melampodium minimum (A.Gray) M.E.Jones; Madia minima (A.Gray) D.D.Keck

= Hemizonella =

Genus of flowering plants

Hemizonella is a genus of North American plants in the tribe Madieae belonging to the family Asteraceae.

The only known species is Hemizonella minima (opposite-leaved tarweed), native to British Columbia, Washington, Oregon, California, Montana, Idaho, Nevada

The plant grows in many types of forest, scrub, and chaparral habitats, from mountains to deserts. It is found in the Sierra Nevada and Cascade Range, and Mojave Desert.

Hemizonella minima is a small annual herb producing a thin, fuzzy stem up to about 15 centimetres (5.9 in) in maximum height. The pointed, hairy leaves are no more than 2.5 centimetres (0.98 in) long. The inflorescence produces one or more tiny flower heads which are oblong or shaped like tops on close inspection. Each is a few millimeters wide, enclosed in phyllaries studded with stalked resin glands, and tipped with minute yellowish florets. The fruit is an achene a few millimeters long with no pappus.
