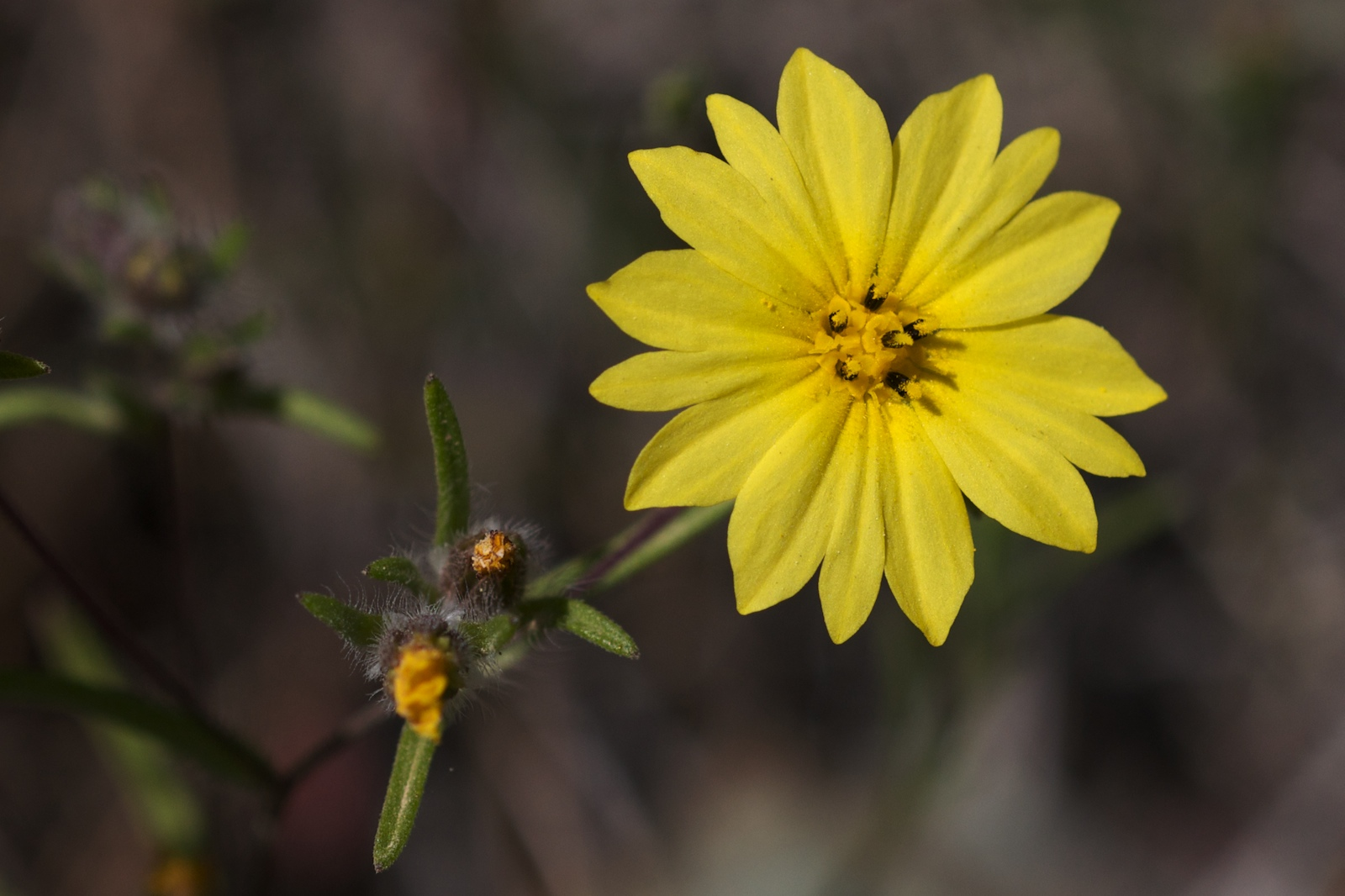

Scientific classification
- Kingdom: Plantae
- Clade: Tracheophytes
- Clade: Angiosperms
- Clade: Eudicots
- Clade: Asterids
- Order: Asterales
- Family: Asteraceae
- Genus: Lagophylla
- Species: L. minor

Binomial name
- Lagophylla minor D.D.Keck

= Lagophylla minor =

Species of flowering plant

Lagophylla minor is a species of flowering plant in the family Asteraceae known by the common name lesser hareleaf. It is endemic to California, where it grows in the foothills surrounding the Sacramento Valley. It is a member of the plant communities growing on serpentine soils. This is an annual herb producing a thin, forking, purplish brown stem covered in small stiff hairs. The hairy leaves are 2 to 5 centimeters long and linear in shape, those on the lower stem toothed and those on the upper smooth-edged. The inflorescence bears flower heads with five bright yellow three-lobed ray florets, six yellow disc florets with black anthers, and phyllaries with long, soft hairs. The fruit is a glossy black achene two to three millimeters long.
