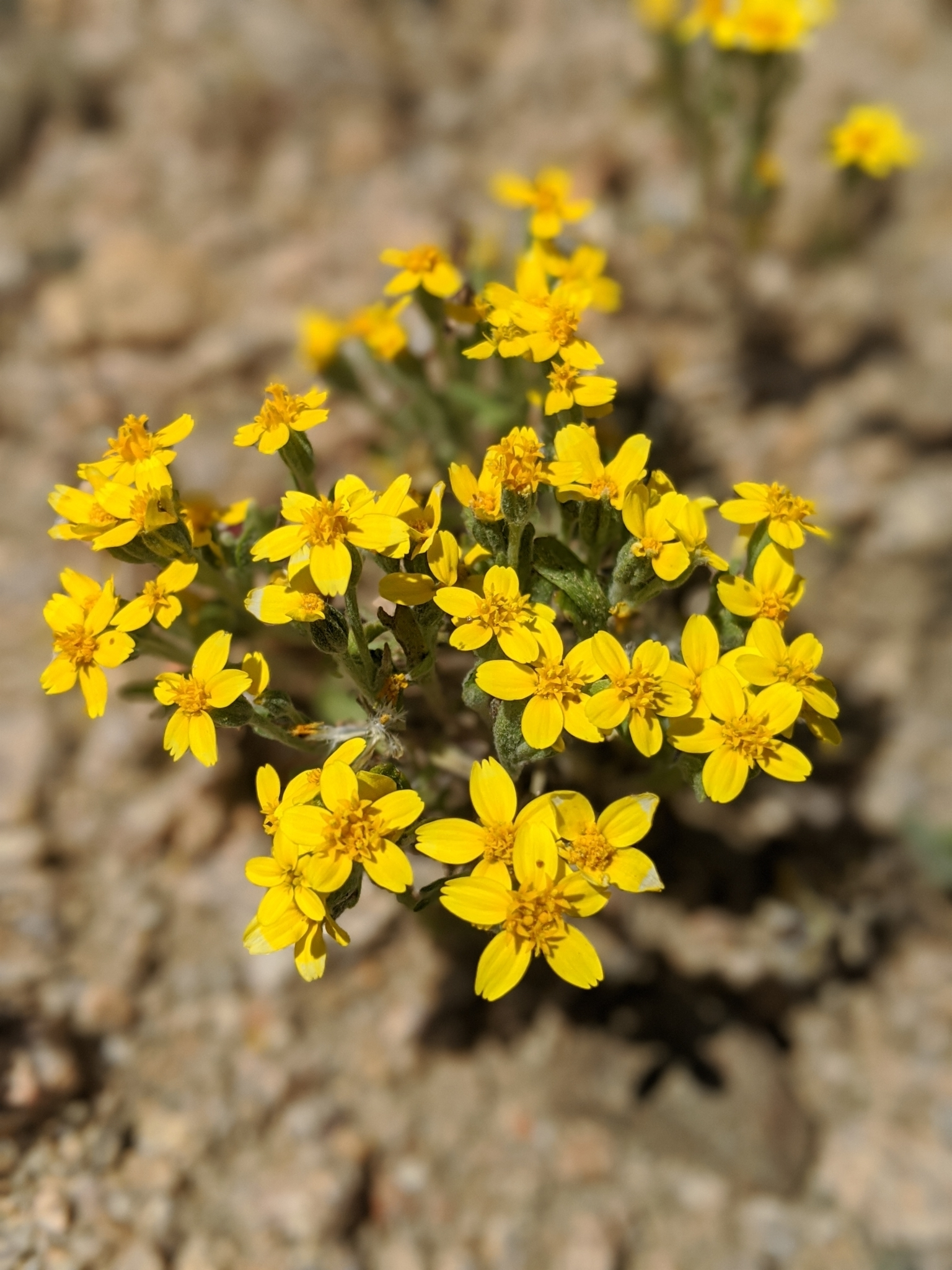
- Syntrichopappus fremontii

Scientific classification
- Kingdom: Plantae
- Clade: Tracheophytes
- Clade: Angiosperms
- Clade: Eudicots
- Clade: Asterids
- Order: Asterales
- Family: Asteraceae
- Subfamily: Asteroideae
- Tribe: Madieae
- Subtribe: Baeriinae
- Genus: Syntrichopappus; A.Gray

Type species
- Syntrichopappus fremontii A.Gray

Species
- 2, see text

= Syntrichopappus =

Genus of flowering plants

Syntrichopappus is a genus of flowering plants in the family Asteraceae, found in the southwestern United States and northern Mexico, including Baja California. It is a member of the Heliantheae alliance of the Asteraceae family. There are two species. Common names include xerasid and Frémont's gold.

The name "Syntrichopappus" derives from a Greek name: "syn" = "joined together", "tricho" = "hair", of the "pappus", which means many bristles fused at the base (however some species have no pappus). The common name "xerasid" derives from Greek, meaning "son of dryness".

== Description ==
=== Leaves ===
Leaves are simple, alternate, sometimes with the lowest ones opposite.

=== Inflorescence ===
Flower heads are solitary. There is one yellow (or white with red veins) ray flower per phyllary, with 3-lobed ligules. The yellow disk flowers are narrowly funnel shaped.

=== Fruits ===
The fruits have 0 to many pappus bristles, fused at the base.

== Species ==
- Syntrichopappus fremontii (yellowray Frémont's gold) is native to desert regions of the American southwest and adjacent Baja California. It is a small woolly herb just a few centimeters tall bearing flower heads with usually five toothed yellow ray florets.
- Syntrichopappus lemmonii (pinkray Frémont's gold) is endemic to California, where it can be found in the southern coastal mountain ranges, including the Transverse Ranges. Its flower heads contain white, red-veined ray florets with pink undersides.
