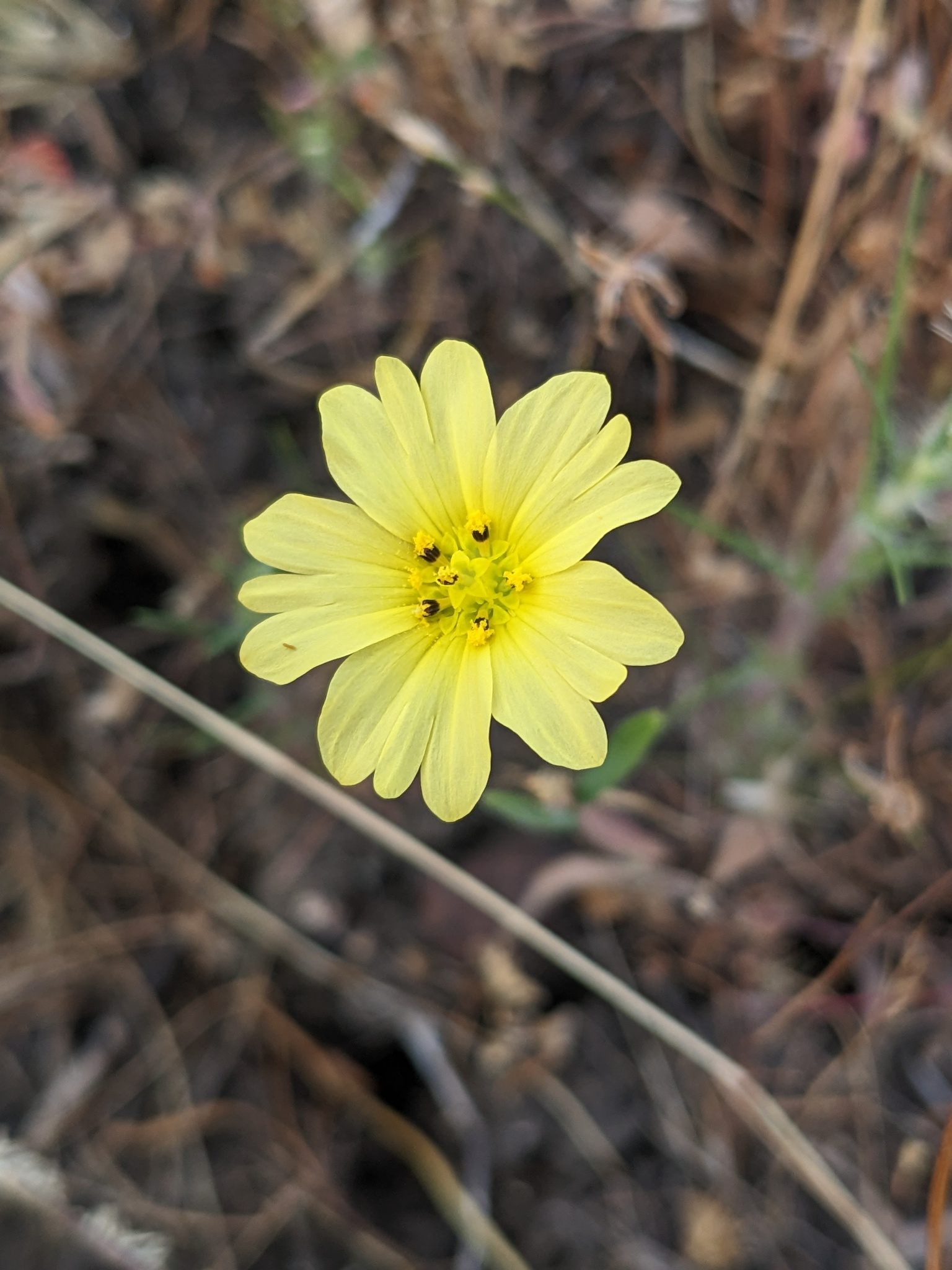

Conservation status
- Apparently Secure (NatureServe)

Scientific classification
- Kingdom: Plantae
- Clade: Tracheophytes
- Clade: Angiosperms
- Clade: Eudicots
- Clade: Asterids
- Order: Asterales
- Family: Asteraceae
- Genus: Lagophylla
- Species: L. glandulosa

Binomial name
- Lagophylla glandulosa A.Gray

= Lagophylla glandulosa =

Species of flowering plant

Lagophylla glandulosa is a species of flowering plant in the family Asteraceae known by the common name glandular hareleaf. It is endemic to California, where it grows in the Central Valley and foothills in chaparral, grassland and woodland habitat. This is an annual herb growing a very thin stem covered in glandular hairs, especially at the top in the inflorescence. The leaves are mostly small, smooth-edged, and glandular-hairy on the top of the stem, with much larger, toothed leaves toward the base. The inflorescence bears flower heads with five bright yellow ray florets, each with three lobes. The center of the head contains six disc florets which are yellow with black anthers. The fruit is a dark brown achene with no pappus.
