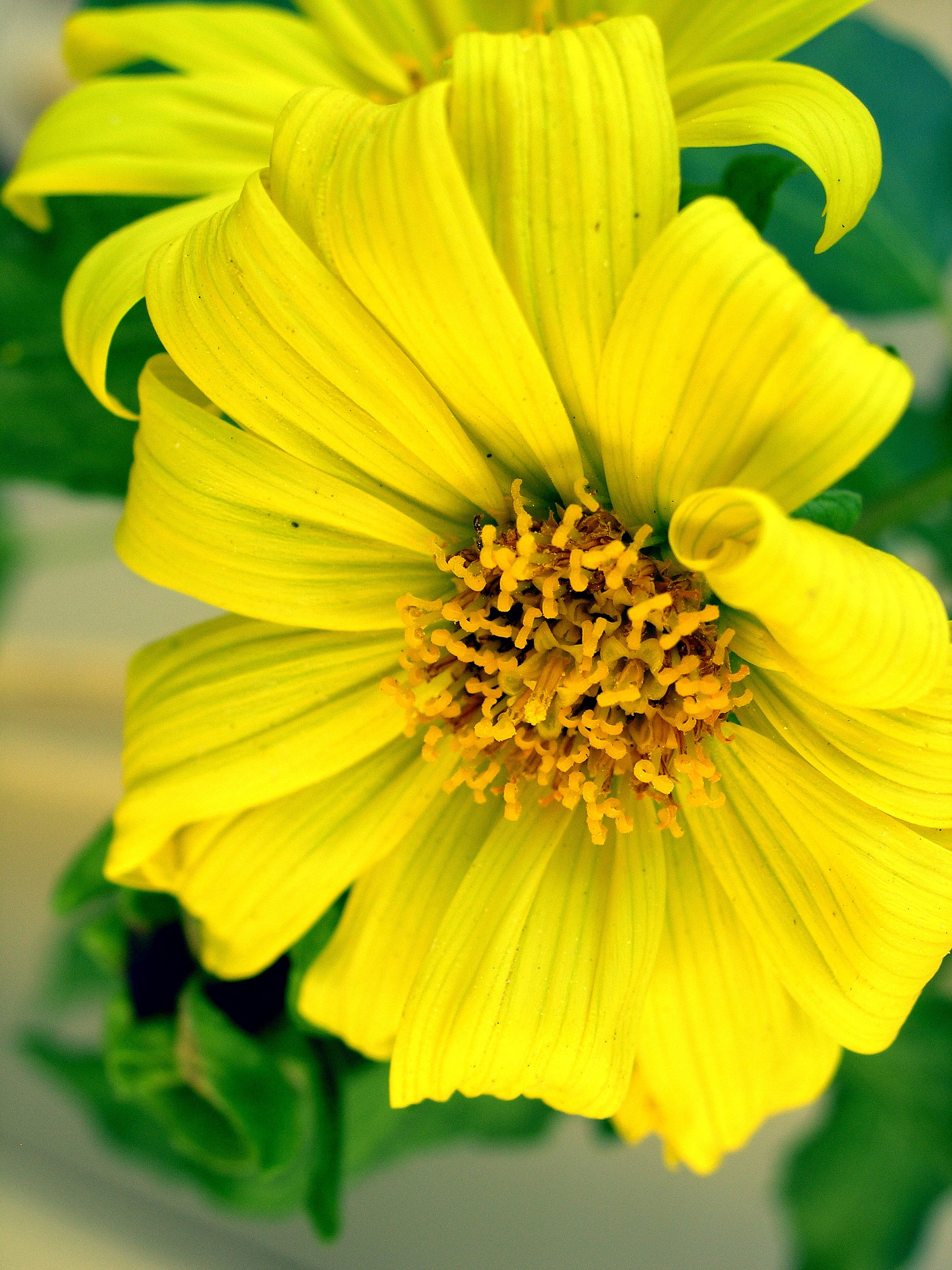

Scientific classification
- Kingdom: Plantae
- Clade: Tracheophytes
- Clade: Angiosperms
- Clade: Eudicots
- Clade: Asterids
- Order: Asterales
- Family: Asteraceae
- Subfamily: Asteroideae
- Tribe: Madieae
- Subtribe: Venegasiinae; B.G.Baldwin
- Genus: Venegasia; DC.
- Species: V. carpesioides

Binomial name
- Venegasia carpesioides DC.

Synonyms
- Venegasia deltoidea Rydb.; Venegasia carpesioides var. deltoides (Rydb.) S.F. Blake

= Venegasia =

Genus of flowering plants

Venegasia is a genus of North American plants in the tribe Madieae within the family Asteraceae.

Venegasia carpesioides is the only known species in the genus. It is shrubby bush growing to 1.8 m tall and prefers locations in moist canyons in southern California, and in Baja California. It is commonly known as the canyon sunflower.

Venegasia was named after the Mexican historian Miguel Venegas, 1680–1764.
