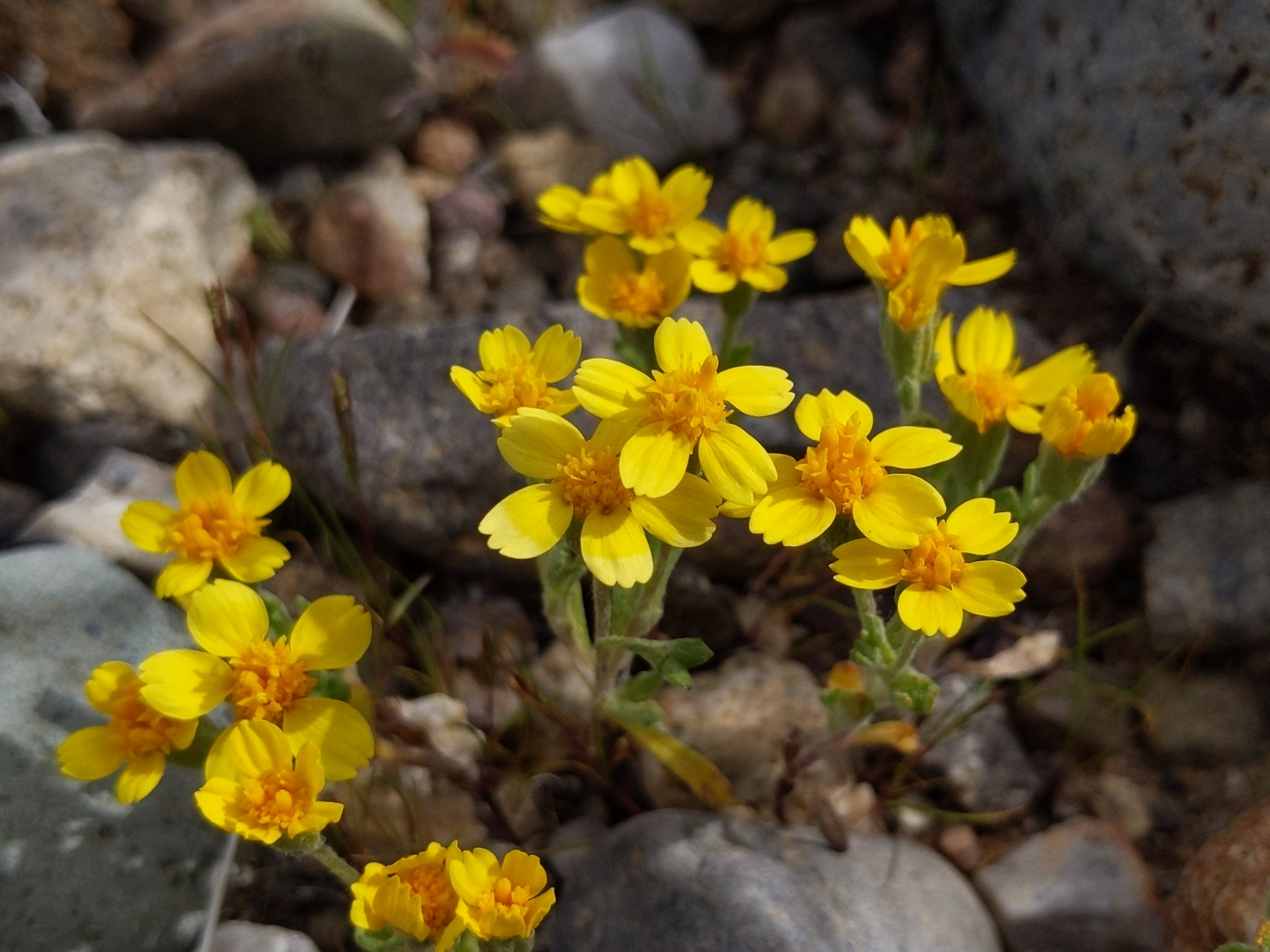

Scientific classification
- Kingdom: Plantae
- Clade: Tracheophytes
- Clade: Angiosperms
- Clade: Eudicots
- Clade: Asterids
- Order: Asterales
- Family: Asteraceae
- Genus: Syntrichopappus
- Species: S. fremontii

Binomial name
- Syntrichopappus fremontii A.Gray

= Syntrichopappus fremontii =

Species of plant

Syntrichopappus fremontii (Fremont's-gold, yellowray Fremont's-gold false woolly daisy, or Fremont's xerasid), is a small annual plant in the family Asteraceae. It has yellow flower heads and grows in the Mojave Desert, to Utah and northwestern Arizona.

== Distribution and habitat ==
Syntrichopappus fremontii grows at an altitude of 600–2500 m, in open sandy or gravelly areas, often in association with Creosote bush scrub or Joshua tree woodland vegetation. It is distributed throughout the Mojave Desert, the southwest Sonoran Desert, and parts of northwestern Arizona, southwestern Utah and northern Baja California.

== Description ==
=== Growth pattern ===
Syntrichopappus fremontii grows from 1 to 11 centimetres (0.39 to 4.33 in) tall and is branched. It somewhat resembles Eriophyllum wallacei, but grows on higher ground and has only about half the number of ray flowers.

=== Leaves and stems ===
Leaves are spoon-shaped or wedge-shaped, 5 to 20 centimetres (2.0 to 7.9 in) long, and may be 3-lobed at the tip.

=== Inflorescence and fruit ===
It flowers from March or April to June. The inflorescence has 5 hardened phyllaries surrounding a head of 5 yellow ray flowers with several yellow disk flowers. The ray flowers have 3 strong lobes, or teeth.

The fruit is an achene with a pappus of 30–40 white bristles about 2 mm long, fused at their base.
