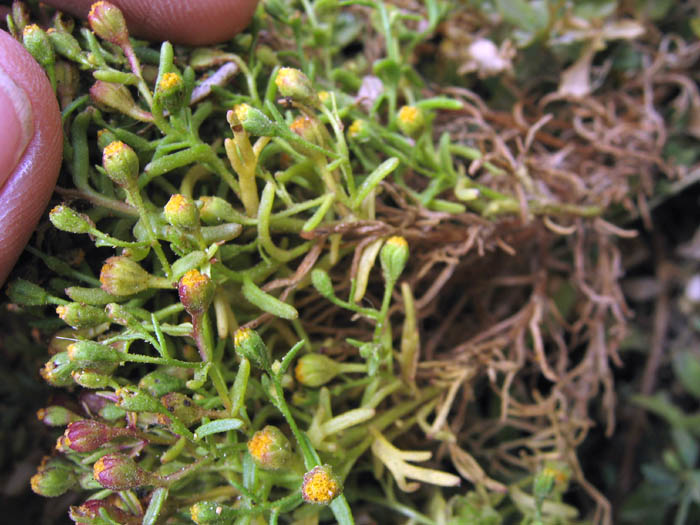

Scientific classification
- Kingdom: Plantae
- Clade: Tracheophytes
- Clade: Angiosperms
- Clade: Eudicots
- Clade: Asterids
- Order: Asterales
- Family: Asteraceae
- Subfamily: Asteroideae
- Tribe: Madieae
- Subtribe: Baeriinae
- Genus: Amblyopappus; Hook. & Arn.
- Species: A. pusillus

Binomial name
- Amblyopappus pusillus Hook. & Arn.

Synonyms
- Aromia Nutt.; Infantea J.Rémy; Amblyopappus pauciflorus Phil.; Aromia tenuifolia Nutt.

= Amblyopappus =

Genus of flowering plants

Amblyopappus is a genus of flowering plants in the family Asteraceae described as a genus in 1841.

There is only one known species, Amblyopappus pusillus, known by the common name dwarf coastweed. This plant is native to Baja California in Mexico and the coast of Southern California in the United States. It can also be found on the west coast of Chile and Peru in South America.

Amblyopappus pusillus is an aromatic annual herb with an erect stem up to 40 centimeters in height. The stem turns dark red with age. It is covered in narrow fleshy leaves and each small branch of the stem is topped with an inflorescence of one to several rounded budlike yellow flowers. The bracts are green, often with reddish edges.
