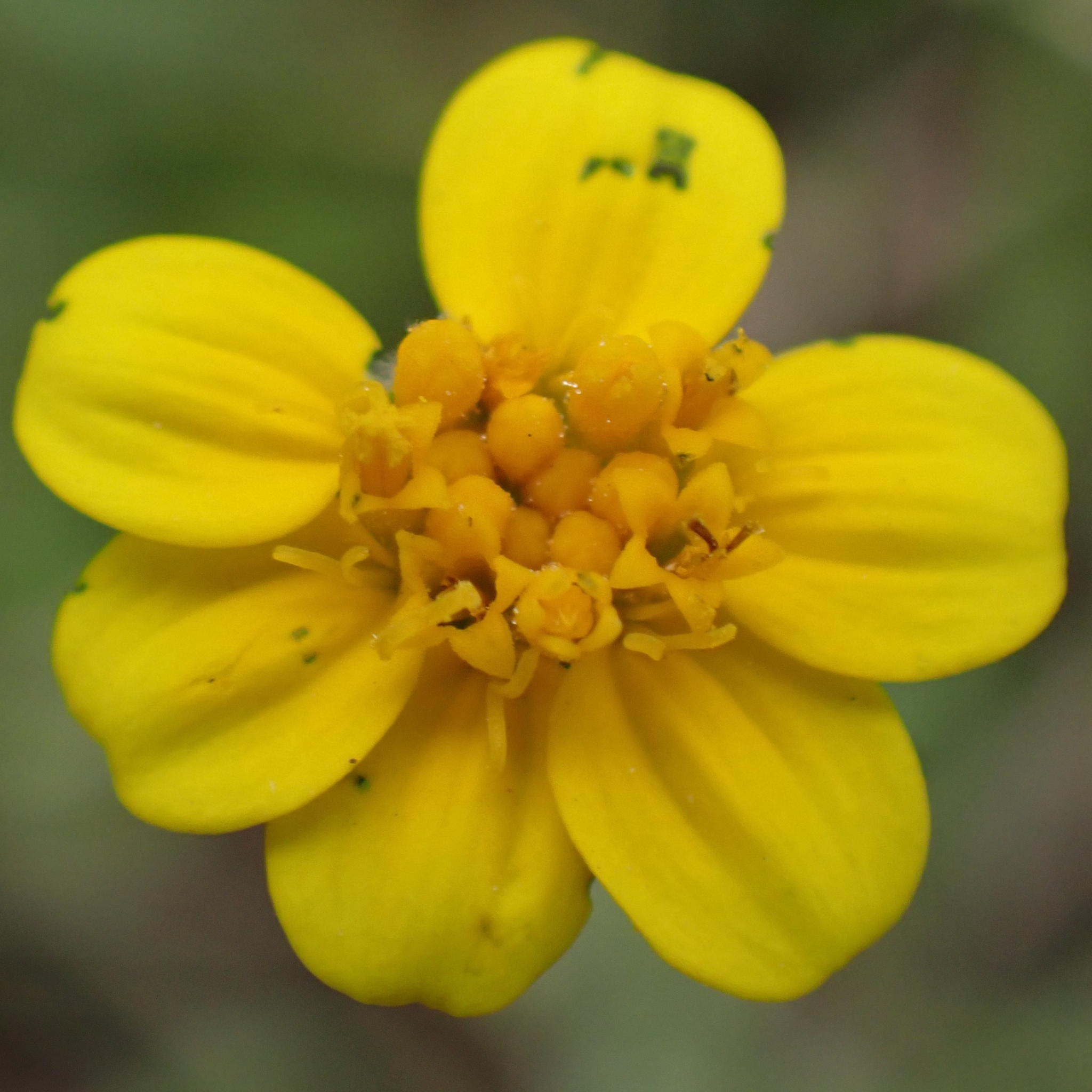

Conservation status
- Threatened (ESA)

Scientific classification
- Kingdom: Plantae
- Clade: Tracheophytes
- Clade: Angiosperms
- Clade: Eudicots
- Clade: Asterids
- Order: Asterales
- Family: Asteraceae
- Genus: Pseudobahia
- Species: P. peirsonii

Binomial name
- Pseudobahia peirsonii Munz

= Pseudobahia peirsonii =

Species of plant

Pseudobahia peirsonii is a rare species of flowering plant in the family Asteraceae known by the common names San Joaquin adobe sunburst and Tulare pseudobahia. It is endemic to California, where it is known from a few mostly small occurrences along the southeastern side of the San Joaquin Valley where it rises into the Sierra Nevada foothills. It grows in grassland and oak woodland habitat. It prefers heavy adobe clay soils. The plant became a federally listed threatened of the United States in 1997.

This species is an annual herb growing 20 to 70 centimeters tall. It has a thin coating of woolly hairs. The leaves are up to 6 centimeters long and are generally divided into a few leaflets which are subdivided into lobed segments. The inflorescence is a solitary flower head lined with about eight phyllaries which are fused at the base, making the involucre a rounded cup with pointed lobes. There are about 8 golden ray florets. At the center of the head are yellow disc florets.

The main threat to its remaining populations is destruction of its habitat for residential development. Other threats include grazing and agriculture and maintenance of flood control structures, transmission lines, and roads. The heavy presence of competitive exotic plants in the habitat, including charlock (Sinapis arvensis), stork's bill (Erodium cicutarium), and non-native bromes, is detrimental.
