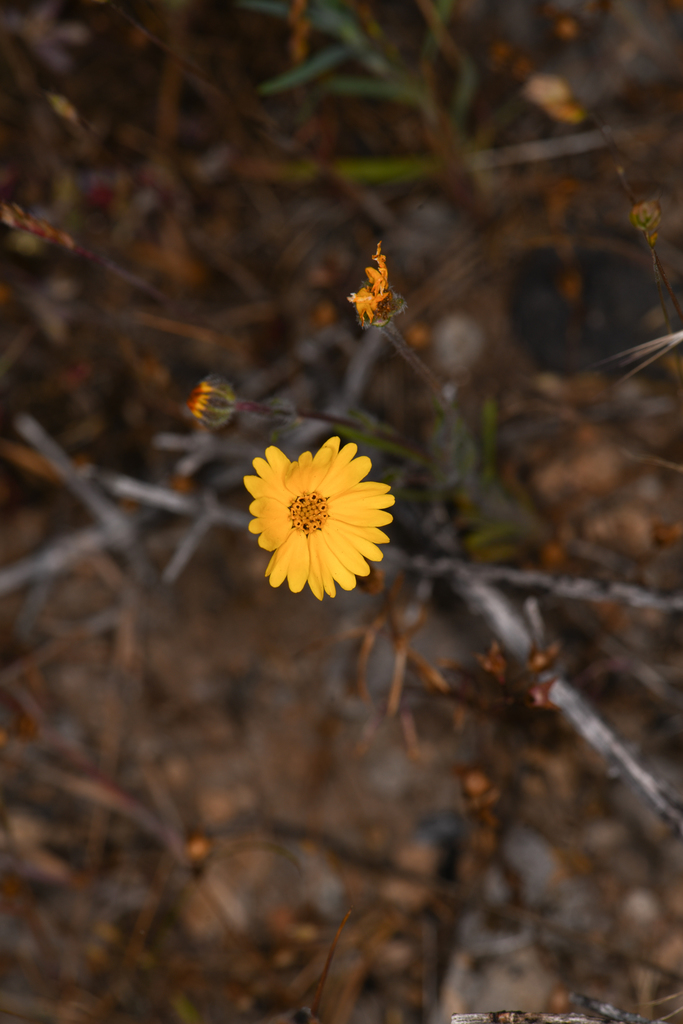
- Jensia rammii

Scientific classification
- Kingdom: Plantae
- Clade: Tracheophytes
- Clade: Angiosperms
- Clade: Eudicots
- Clade: Asterids
- Order: Asterales
- Family: Asteraceae
- Subfamily: Asteroideae
- Tribe: Madieae
- Subtribe: Madiinae
- Genus: Jensia; B.G.Baldwin

Type species
- Madia yosemitana Parry ex A.Gray

= Jensia =

Genus of flowering plants

Jensia is a genus of flowering plants in the family Asteraceae, endemic to California.

Species

- Jensia rammii (Greene) B.G.Baldwin - Sierra Nevada foothills (Butte Co to Calaveras Co with report of isolated population in Tulare Co)
- Jensia yosemitana (Parry ex A.Gray) B.G.Baldwin - Sierra Nevada from (Nevada Co to Kern Co)
