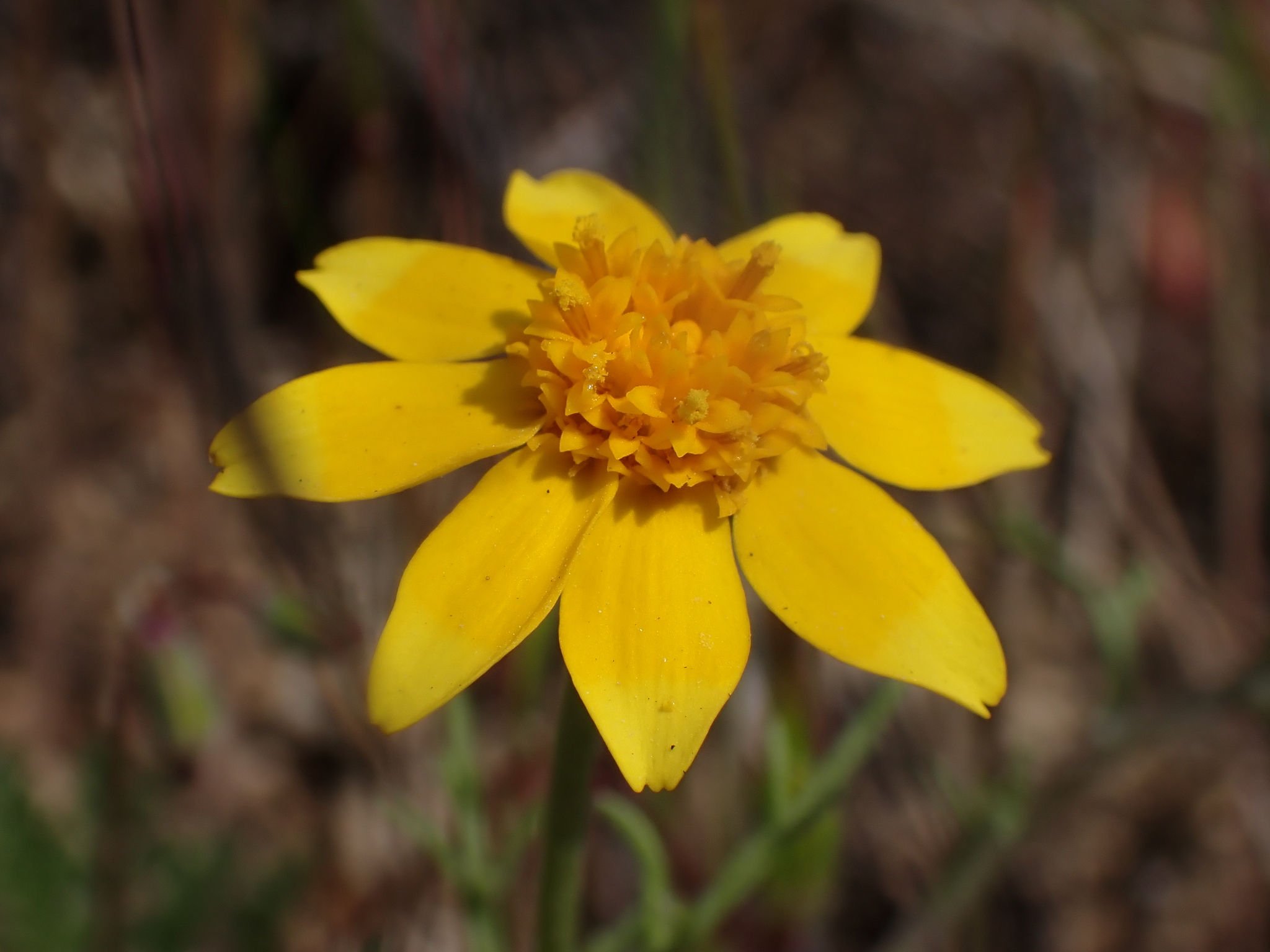

Scientific classification
- Kingdom: Plantae
- Clade: Tracheophytes
- Clade: Angiosperms
- Clade: Eudicots
- Clade: Asterids
- Order: Asterales
- Family: Asteraceae
- Genus: Pseudobahia
- Species: P. heermannii

Binomial name
- Pseudobahia heermannii (Durand) Rydb.

= Pseudobahia heermannii =

Species of plant

Pseudobahia heermannii is a species of flowering plant in the family Asteraceae known by the common names foothill sunburst and brittlestem.

It is endemic to California, where it occurs in grassland, chaparral, woodlands, and other habitat in the Sierra Nevada foothills and a section of the Central Coast Ranges.

It is an annual herb growing 10 to 30 centimeters tall with a pale green to reddish woolly or cobwebby stem. The leaves are divided into several narrow, toothed lobes. The inflorescence is a solitary flower head with a small, hard, cuplike involucre of about 8 fused phyllaries. From the involucre bloom about 8 golden ray florets around a center of hairless disc florets.
