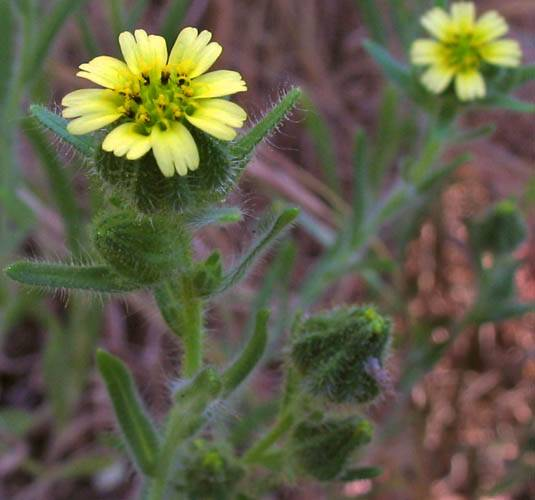
- Madia gracilis

Scientific classification
- Kingdom: Plantae
- Clade: Tracheophytes
- Clade: Angiosperms
- Clade: Eudicots
- Clade: Asterids
- Order: Asterales
- Family: Asteraceae
- Subfamily: Asteroideae
- Tribe: Madieae; Bentham & Hooker f.

Genera
- See text

= Madieae =

Tribe of flowering plants

Madieae is a tribe of flowering plants in the family Asteraceae. It is sometimes considered a subtribe of Heliantheae. Notable species include the tarweeds of the Western United States as well as the silverswords of Hawaii.

== Subtribes and genera ==
Madieae subtribes and genera recognized by the Global Compositae Database as of April 2022:

- Subtribe Arnicinae B.G.Baldwin
  - Arnica L.
- Subtribe Baeriinae Benth. & Hook.f.
  - Amblyopappus Hook. & Arn.
  - Baeriopsis J.T.Howell
  - Constancea B.G.Baldwin
  - Eriophyllum Lag.
  - Lasthenia Cass.
  - Monolopia DC.
  - Pseudobahia (A.Gray) Rydb.
  - Syntrichopappus A.Gray
- Subtribe Hulseinae B.G.Baldwin
  - Eatonella A.Gray
  - Hulsea Torr. & A.Gray
- Subtribe Madiinae Benth. & Hook.f.
  - Achyrachaena Schauer
  - Adenothamnus D.D.Keck
  - Anisocarpus Nutt.
  - Argyroxiphium DC.
  - Blepharipappus Hook.
  - Blepharizonia (A.Gray) Greene
  - Calycadenia DC.
  - Carlquistia B.G.Baldwin
  - Centromadia Greene
  - Deinandra Greene
  - Dubautia Gaudich.
  - Harmonia B.G.Baldwin
  - Hemizonella A.Gray
  - Hemizonia DC.
  - Holocarpha Greene
  - Holozonia Greene
  - Jensia B.G.Baldwin
  - Kyhosia B.G.Baldwin
  - Lagophylla Nutt.
  - Layia Hook. & Arn. ex DC.
  - Madia Molina
  - Osmadenia Nutt.
  - Raillardella (A.Gray) Benth. & Hook.f.
  - Wilkesia A.Gray
- Subtribe Venegasiinae B.G.Baldwin
  - Venegasia DC.
